= Graham Hogg (Royal Navy officer) =

British World War II flying ace

Graham Angus Hogg
- Born: 3 May 1921; Shotley Bridge, England
- Died: 19 March 1942 (aged 20); Monkton, Scotland
- Burial place: Warriston Crematorium, Edinburgh, Scotland
- Military career
- Allegiance: United Kingdom
- Branch: Royal Navy: Fleet Air Arm
- Service years: 1939–1942
- Rank: Sub-Lieutenant
- Unit: 806 Naval Air Squadron
- Conflicts: Second World War: Norwegian campaign; Operation Dynamo; Battle of Crete; Syria–Lebanon campaign
- Awards: Distinguished Service Cross & Bar; Mention in despatches

Graham Angus Hogg, DSC & Bar (3 May 1921 – 19 March 1942) was a fighter ace in the Fleet Air Arm of the Royal Navy during the Second World War. He is credited with the destruction of at least twelve aircraft, with eight of these shared with other pilots.

From Shotley Bridge, Hogg joined the Royal Navy Volunteer Reserve in early 1939 and trained as a pilot. He served in the Fleet Air Arm, and was posted to 806 Squadron. He flew in the unit's campaign of late May 1940 in Norway, for which he was mentioned in despatches. After being engaged in operations over Dunkirk, he went with the squadron to the Mediterranean, flying Fairey Fulmar fighters from the aircraft carrier HMS Illustrious from September. He claimed several aerial victories over the next six months, and was twice awarded the Distinguished Service Cross. He later flew Hawker Hurricane fighters during the Syria–Lebanon campaign. Repatriated to the United Kingdom in late 1941, he was wounded in a flying accident on 18 March 1942. He died of his injuries the next day, aged 20.

== Early life ==
Graham Angus Hogg was born on 3 May 1921 at Shotley Bridge in the north of England. He went to school in Edinburgh, where he attended Melville College. In early 1939, he joined the Royal Navy Volunteer Reserve (RNVR) and trained as a pilot at Desford.

== Second World War ==
In February 1940, upon completion of his training Hogg was posted to the Fleet Air Arm's 806 Squadron. This was a newly formed unit based at Worthy Down and equipped with Blackburn Skua divebombers and the Blackburn Roc two-seater fighter. During the later stages of the Norwegian campaign, the squadron operated from RNAS Hatston, on the Orkney Islands, carrying out attacks on Bergen in Norway.

In late May, Hogg was part of a detachment of 806 Squadron that was sent to the south of England. There he was involved in Operation Dynamo as part of the efforts to provide aerial cover for the evacuation of the British Expeditionary Force from the beaches at Dunkirk. On 28 May, Hogg's aircraft was damaged, and his observer killed, in an incidence of friendly fire; fighters of the Royal Air Force's No. 610 Squadron had attacked his Skua after it was misidentified as a Vought SB2U Vindicator, which were known to be operated by the Luftwaffe after being captured from the French Navy. Late the following month he was mentioned in despatches "for daring and resource in the conduct of hazardous and successful operations by the Fleet Air Arm against the enemy, especially on the Coast of Norway".

=== Service in the Mediterranean ===
Following its involvement in the Dunkirk evacuation, 806 Squadron began to reequip with the Fairey Fulmar fighter and it embarked on the aircraft carrier HMS Illustrious for the Mediterranean in September. Once there, it commenced operations against the Italian forces in the region. Hogg's first aerial victory was on 29 September, when he shot down a CANT Z.501 Gabbiano seaplane near Alexandria. Two weeks later, on 12 October, he shared in the destruction of two Savoia-Marchetti SM.79 medium bombers near the island of Malta. He and two other pilots shared in the shooting down of a SM.79 some 180 miles (290 km) to the east of Malta on 8 November. He combined with another pilot to destroy a CANT Z.506 seaplane on 13 November, to the west of Malta.

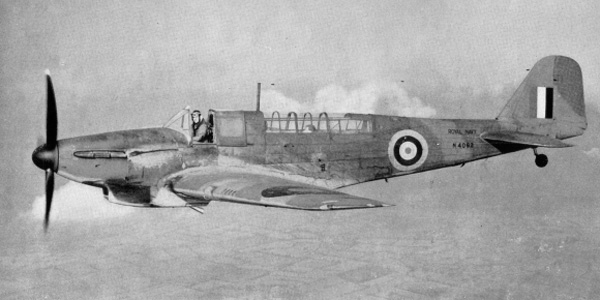
A Fairey Fulmar fighter

On 10 January 1941, Hogg, while in pursuit of some S.79s sighted an aircraft on an island about 100 miles (160 km) to the west of Malta. This was identified as a S.79 and he, along with another pilot, shared in its destruction. Later in the day Illustrious was attacked by several Junkers Ju 87 dive bombers of the Luftwaffe; Hogg was able to intercept and destroy one of these. The damage to the aircraft carrier saw it taken off operations for repairs. Consequently 806 Squadron was based at Malta as part of the island's aerial defences for a time and on 16 January Hogg claimed the destruction of two Junkers Ju 88 medium bombers over the island. The following month the squadron embarked on HMS Formidable and its operations in the Mediterranean resumed. Now holding the rank of sub-lieutenant, Hogg's run of successes over the preceding few months saw him awarded the Distinguished Service Cross (DSC) on 8 April, one of several 806 Squadron pilots to be recognised for "For gallant service against enemy aircraft".

On 21 April Hogg and fellow 806 Squadron pilot Stanley Orr shared in the destruction of a Dornier Do 24 seaplane off the Libyan coast. During the latter stages of the Battle of Crete and as the Allied forces were evacuated from the besieged island, 806 Squadron was involved in interception duties. On 26 May he and other pilots of 806 Squadron combined in the destruction of a pair of Ju 88s in the vicinity of Crete. On the last day of the month, he shot down another Ju 88 near Alexandria. This was shared with another pilot.

Formidable had been damaged during its service at Crete and 806 Squadron was disembarked in Egypt. It reequipped with Hawker Hurricane fighters provided by the Royal Air Force and started flying from land bases in Palestine, patrolling along the Syrian coastline. It was engaged in the Allied invasion of Syria from June to July. In the meantime Hogg was awarded a Bar to his DSC in the 1941 Birthday Honours, the announcement in the London Gazette noting it was "for outstanding zeal, patience and cheerfulness, and for never failing to set an example of whole-hearted devotion to duty, without which the high tradition of the Royal Navy could not have been upheld.

=== Return to United Kingdom ===
Hogg was repatriated to the United Kingdom in late 1941 and was posted to a night flying school. On 18 March 1942 an Avro Anson in which he was a passenger had an engine failure and crashed on landing at Monkton. Of the five people in the aircraft, Hogg was the only person injured, with severe wounds to his head. Taken to hospital, he died the following day. Commemorated at the Warriston Crematorium in Edinburgh, he is credited with having shot down twelve aircraft, eight of which shared with other pilots, as well as the shared destruction of an aircraft on the ground.
