= 806 Naval Air Squadron =

Inactive flying squadron of the Royal Navy's Fleet Air Arm

- Squadron badge
- Active: 1940–1943; 1945–1947; 1948; 1953–1955; 1957–1960
- Disbanded: 15 December 1960
- Country: United Kingdom
- Branch: Royal Navy
- Type: Single-seat fighter squadron
- Role: Carrier-based fighter squadron
- Part of: Fleet Air Arm
- Mottos: Sursum in pugnam (Latin for 'Up and into the fight')
- Aircraft: See Aircraft flown section for full list.
- Engagements: World War II: Norwegian Campaign; Operation Dynamo; Battle of the Mediterranean; Western Desert Campaign; Malta convoys; Battle of Cape Matapan; Battle of Crete; Battle of Madagascar
- Decorations: Boyd Trophy 1955
- Battle honours: Norway 1940; Dunkirk 1940; Mediterranean 1940–1941; Libya 1940–1941; Malta Convoys 1941-42; Matapan 1941; Crete 1941; Diego Suarez 1942

Insignia
- Squadron Badge Description: Per fess wavy red and barry wavy of six white and blue, issuant from base a dexter cubit arm pale armoured proper grasping a flash of lightning in bend gold (1945)
- Identification Markings: L6A+ (Skua/Roc); 6A+ (Fulmar/Sea Gladiator 1940-41); single letters (Hurricane); 6A+ (Fulmar November 1941); 0A+ (Fulmar on Illustrious); 8A+ (Martlet 1942); 6A+ (Seafire); 111-123 (Seafire August 1946); 161-174 (Sea Hawk March 1953); 175-190 (Sea Hawk January 1957)
- Fin Carrier Codes: Y:R (Seafire August 1946); C (Sea Hawk March 1953); J:E:A (Sea Hawk January 1957)

806 Naval Air Squadron (806 NAS), sometimes alluded to as 806 Squadron, is an inactive Fleet Air Arm (FAA) naval air squadron of the United Kingdom’s Royal Navy (RN). It was most recently active with the Hawker Sea Hawk FGA.6 fighter and ground attack aircraft from April 1958 until December 1960. Additionally, it was the final front-line squadron of the Fleet Air Arm to operate the Sea Hawk, with its last deployment aboard HMS Albion before disbanding at RNAS Brawdy.

It existed on a number of occasions from February 1940 to December 1960 and saw active service in the Norwegian campaign, the Dunkirk evacuation and the Malta Convoys. During the early years of the Second World War it operated with a variety of fighter aircraft including Blackburn Skua, Blackburn Roc, Fairey Fulmar, Gloster Sea Gladiator, Hawker Hurricane and Grumman Martlet. It later flew Supermarine Seafire but the war ended before it saw action. It briefly flew Hawker Sea Fury, de Havilland Sea Hornet and de Havilland Sea Vampire in 1948.

== History ==
=== Second World War ===
==== Formation ====
806 Naval Air Squadron was formed at HMS Kestrel, the Royal Naval Air Station near Winchester, Hampshire, on 1 February 1940 with Lieutenant Commander Charles Evans as the commanding officer and Lieutenant Desmond Vincent-Jones as the Senior Observer and using eight Blackburn Skuas, a carrier-based fighter-bomber and four Blackburn Roc fighter aircraft.

However, another source gives the date and location as being 15 February at Eastleigh, possibly referring to HMS Raven and states that the squadron did not have sufficient crews to operate its aircraft until the next group from the fighter training school had been trained.

==== Norwegian operations ====
806 Squadron then saw its first action when it was moved in the beginning of May to HMS Sparrowhawk, Royal Naval Air Station Hatston the military airfield located one mile to the north west of Kirkwall, on the island of Mainland, Orkney, in order to finish working up and to then carry out bombing attacks on targets around Bergen in Norway. In these the squadron attacked oil facilities and ships, escorted by RAF Coastal Command Bristol Blenheims from No. 254 Squadron RAF.

Their first such attack was carried out on 9 May upon a ship at Doksjeir jetty in Bergen Harbour that was reported potentially to be a cruiser at the time but later believed to have been a transport. Escorted by six Blenheims the eight Skuas armed each with a 500 lb semi-armour-piercing bomb attacked the harbour in conjunction with their escorts. Enemy action shot down a single Blenheim and also damaged one Blackburn Skua but its crew, Petty Officer Jopling and Naval Airman Jones, managed to bring the damaged plane back and were unharmed. A source states that Lieutenant Campbell-Horsfall was leading the raid and that it resulted in a single direct hit claimed upon a transport and another upon an oil tank within the port and that some escort vessels were strafed by the Skuas. According to Midshipman Hogg in quotes within the same source, reconnaissance photographs received on 11 May showed that the raid successfully sunk a training cruiser due to three direct hits, one forward, one amidships, one astern. Also Midshipman Hogg recalls that the Skua piloted by Sub Lieutenant Orr also returned with damage.

Another source, however, only mentions several hits being claimed upon the transport and also states that the Commanding Officer and Senior Observer led the raid and each received a Distinguished Service Cross, while Petty Officer Muskett and Petty Officer Clare both received a Distinguished Service Medal.

On May 11, an operation was conducted targeting an oil tank farm complex situated on Askøy Island. Lieutenant Commander Charles Evans commanded six Blackburn Skuas, each equipped with a single 250 lb semi-armour-piercing bomb and four 20 lb cooper bombs. It is likely that only six Blackburn Skuas participated due to the unserviceability of the remaining two, which had sustained damage during the attack on 9 May 9. Additionally, three Bristol Blenheims, also armed with incendiary bombs, provided escort for the Blackburn Skuas. The attack by the squadrons faced virtually no opposition, resulting in no casualties for either squadron, and several hits on the oil tanks were reported, which were subsequently confirmed to be on fire through reconnaissance photographs.

On 12 May, an assault targeted shipping near Bergen, focusing on an enemy transport vessel believed to be carrying anti-aircraft artillery for the port. Lieutenant Commander Evans led six Skuas, supported by three Blenheims, to attack the ship as it entered the fjords, accompanied by two destroyers. They executed a dive bombing in two waves, but all six 500 lb bombs missed, and no casualties were reported.

The final assault by 806 Naval Air Squadron on maritime and oil facilities in the Bergen region occurred on 16 May 1940, targeting German naval vessels believed to be present in the harbour. Nine Blackburn Skuas, equipped with a single 250 lb semi-armour-piercing bomb and four 20 lb cooper bombs, were designated to participate in this operation. As with prior missions, the Bristol Blenheims from 254 Squadron were also scheduled to accompany them. However, the two squadrons did not manage to meet as planned, and while 806 Naval Air Squadron continued its search independently, no warships were found in the vicinity. Consequently, the squadron redirected their efforts towards their alternative target, the fuel tanks at Kaarven, Florgasaaspynt, Strudshavn, successfully striking them without sustaining any casualties.

==== Dunkirk evacuations ====
After the attacks over Norway the squadron returned to HMS Kestrel but a detachment of nine aircraft soon moved to RAF Detling in Kent on 27 May in order to provide air cover for the Dunkirk evacuation and started its first patrol on 28 May.

The first patrol started poorly as the section’s Blackburn Roc, which was piloted by Midshipman Marshall with Naval Airman Jones manning its dorsal turret, crashed whilst getting airborne but luckily without casualties. It got worse as the remaining two, which were both Blackburn Skuas, were then attacked by friendly fighters near Goodwin Sands. This resulted in the Skua which was crewed by Lieutenant Campbell-Horsfall and Petty Officer Clare being shot down and picked up by a nearby destroyer while the other piloted by Midshipman Hogg had managed to limp to RAF Manston damaged and Naval Airman Burton, the Telegraphist Air Gunner, killed. Lieutenant Campbell-Horsfall and Petty Officer Clare both received bullet wounds.

Another section that was sent to patrol in the afternoon on 29 May with Lieutenant Barnes and Lieutenant Vincent-Jones leading in a Blackburn Skua. Another Blackburn Skua piloted by Sub Lieutenant Ayres and a single Blackburn Roc crewed by Midshipman Day and Naval Airman Newton were the other two machines in the section's patrol. They surprised five Junkers Ju 88's that were attacking a convoy near Ostend. Both Skuas attacked above while the Roc flew directly under the enemy and with the turret firing upwards managed to destroy one Ju 88 resulting in the Blackburn Roc's sole air-to-air kill in the war. Both Skuas also managed to damage another Ju 88 which was then seen limping away with serious damage and losing height. All three aircraft landed back at RAF Detling safely. Another patrol on 30 May in poor conditions attacked a Heinkel He 111 that was preparing to attack a transport. The enemy machine jettisoned its bombs due to the Skuas attack but was then lost in the poor visibility.

The final patrol of 806 in the operations concerning Dunkirk took place on 2 June 1940, under the leadership of Charles Evans. During this mission, an enemy Junkers Ju 88 was observed attacking HMS Calcutta, prompting a response from the squadron; however, the aircraft vanished into the clouds in a gradual spiral, likely having been destroyed. Another Ju 88 was sighted and engaged, but it too dived and was lost within the clouds. Subsequently, an Avro Anson from RAF Coastal Command reported witnessing a Ju 88 returning over Dunkirk with its port engine ablaze, shortly after the engagement with the Ju 88 by 806 Naval Air Squadron.

An 801 Naval Air Squadron detachment joined 806 NAS in operations during Operation Dynamo on 31 May 1940 and eventually relieved 806 Naval Air Squadron which was then to start training onto the Fairey Fulmar at HMS Kestrel.

==== Embarking in Illustrious and working-up in Bermuda ====
In June, the squadron boarded HMS Illustrious along with 815 and 819 Naval Air Squadrons, with which they had been temporarily stationed at RAF Detling for Operation Dynamo. Subsequently, HMS Illustrious departed for Bermuda to conduct training for the ship's company and the crews of the embarked squadrons. During one of the training flights, a Blackburn Skua from 806 Naval Air Squadron was inadvertently lost. This aircraft had been dispatched alongside an aircraft from 815 Naval Air Squadron, piloted by Charles Lamb, to perform dummy attacks to determine the most effective defence for a Fairey Swordfish against daylight fighter assaults. In the course of its second dummy attack, the Fairey Swordfish was flying at sea level while the Blackburn Skua pilot descended from an altitude of two or three thousand feet, miscalculating the altitudes of both aircraft. Unfortunately, he was unable to recover from his dive and crashed into the sea, resulting in no survivors.

During another flight while stationed in Bermuda, all three squadrons aboard HMS Illustrious were launched from the deck while it was anchored. However, when the time came to land an hour later, the wind had completely calmed. With the crash barrier lowered to utilise the full length of the deck, all the Fairey Swordfish successfully landed without damaging their arrestor hooks. When it was 806 Naval Air Squadron's turn, Lieutenant Commander Charles Evans was the first to attempt landing. Due to the higher speed at touchdown from the Blackburn Skua, the arrestor hook on his aircraft was ripped from the fuselage, forcing him to apply right rudder and slam the nose of his aircraft into the ship's island to prevent it from continuing down the deck and plunging into the water. The second aircraft to land maintained enough speed to become airborne again after losing its arrestor hook and had to circle in the air while the rest of the squadron attempted to land. Ultimately, it was directed to find a location in Bermuda for a forced landing; the pilot opted for a golf course, resulting in the aircraft's wings being sheared off by trees. The remaining pilots in the squadron either emulated the commanding officer's actions during their landing attempts or continued down the deck and fell into the water, with the exception of one aircraft that managed to halt before going over the edge. Although no injuries occurred from this final incident in Bermuda, all the aircraft in the squadron sustained damage. Consequently, instead of proceeding directly to the Mediterranean from Bermuda, HMS Illustrious had to return to the Clyde, where they re-equipped with Fulmars, and the squadron was granted several weeks to familiarise themselves with the new aircraft.

==== Mediterranean ====
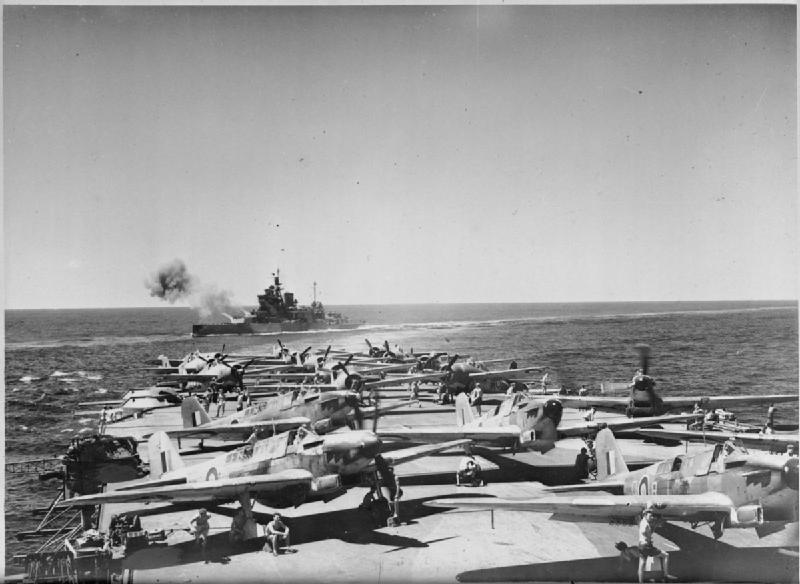
The flight deck of HMS Illustrious with Fairey Fulmar Mk.II of 806 Squadron

The Blackburn Rocs were substituted with Fairey Fulmars, and the squadron boarded HMS Illustrious in June 1940. Simultaneously, the Blackburn Skuas were also replaced by Fairey Fulmars and supplemented with Gloster Sea Gladiators prior to the ship's departure for the Mediterranean. Within the Mediterranean region, RNAS Dekheila (HMS Grebe), Alexandria, Egypt, served as a shore base, facilitating operations from both there and the carrier, where the squadron successfully accounted for over twenty enemy aircraft.

When HMS Illustrious sustained damage during a Malta Convoy in January 1941, the squadron disembarked at RAF Hal Far, Malta. Some crews later accompanied the ship to reform in Egypt, while a Flight continued operations in Malta, ultimately being credited with the destruction of eighteen enemy aircraft. In February, defence was provided for the forces in Crete, after which the squadron joined sister ship HMS Formidable and participated in a series of operations before disembarking to Egypt in May, following the ship's damage from enemy bombing off Crete. Throughout the summer of 1941, RAF Hawker Hurricanes were deployed, functioning as part of the Royal Navy Fighter Squadron in North Africa, which was a provisional merger of 803, 805, and 806 Naval Air Squadrons at RNAS Dekheila (HMS Grebe) on the 2 August 1941.

==== Indian Ocean ====
The combined unit was disbanded in February 1942. Subsequently, 806 re-equipped with twelve Fairey Fulmar aircraft and divided into two sections for relocation to Ceylon, with the first section departing on 12 March and the second arriving at RN Air Section Ratamalana, located at RAF Ratmalana, Ceylon, on 4 April. The squadron engaged in combat against Japanese aircraft that were attacking Ceylon from 5 to 9 April, the Easter Sunday Raid and then boarded HMS Illustrious for operations in Madagascar from 5 to 9 May, later disembarking to the RN Air Section at RAF Port Reitz, Mombasa.

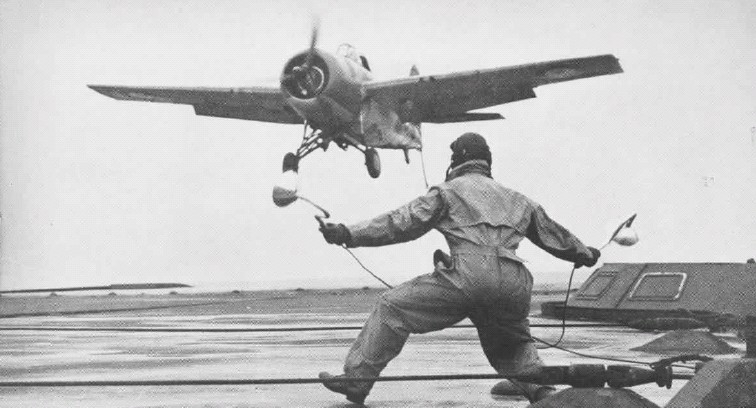
Grumman Martlet of 806 Squadron landing on HMS Indomitable

The squadron was split into two flights: 'A', was equipped with Grumman Martlets for deployment aboard another Illustrious-class aircraft carrier HMS Indomitable, which returned to the Mediterranean to participate in Operation Pedestal, a convoy to Malta and 'B', which employed Fairey Fulmars for operations from HMS Illustrious, in May 1942. The first flight was disbanded following the damage sustained by HMS Indomitable during Operation Pedestal on 12 August 1942, resulting in 806B being designated as 806 Squadron, with HMS Illustrious and continuing their patrols in the Indian Ocean, as well as engaging in further operations in Madagascar during September. Ultimately, after disembarking in East Africa, the Flight was integrated into 803 Squadron while stationed in East Africa at RNAS Tanga (HMS Kilele), (formerly Tanganyika, now Tanzania) on 18 January 1943.

=== Seafire (1945-1947) ===
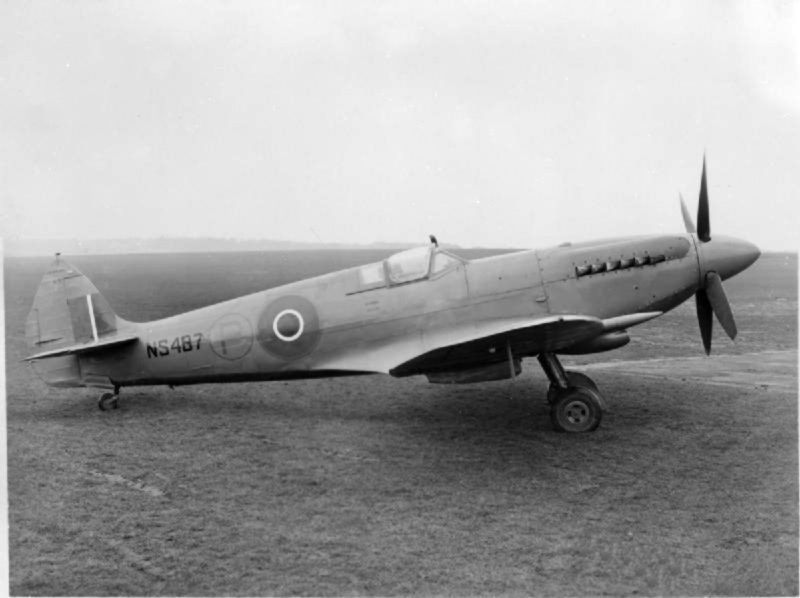
Supermarine Seafire F Mk.XV prototype

806 Naval Air Squadron was reformed at RNAS Machrihanish (HMS Landrail), Argyll and Bute, in August 1945, initially equipped with twelve Supermarine Seafire L Mk.IIIs, which were subsequently replaced by F Mk.XVs.

The Seafire F Mk.XV, recognised as the first variant equipped with the Rolls-Royce Griffon engine, conducted its initial flight in February 1944. Besides the integration of the Griffon VI engine, the Mk.XV was differentiated from earlier models by its increased fuel capacity, which included tanks situated within the wings. Additionally, the sting-type arrester hook was standardised. It began its operational service with FAA squadrons in August 1945.

However, these aircraft were left behind when the unit sailed to the Far East in April 1946. The intention was for the squadron to join the 21st Carrier Air Group aboard a Colossus class light fleet carrier, but this plan did not come to fruition. Instead, it became part of the 16th Carrier Air Group, operating with twelve Seafire F Mk.XVs and embarking in HMS Glory in September. Following a tour in Australia, the ship returned to the UK, and the squadron was disbanded upon arrival in October 1947.

=== Aerobatic team (1948) ===
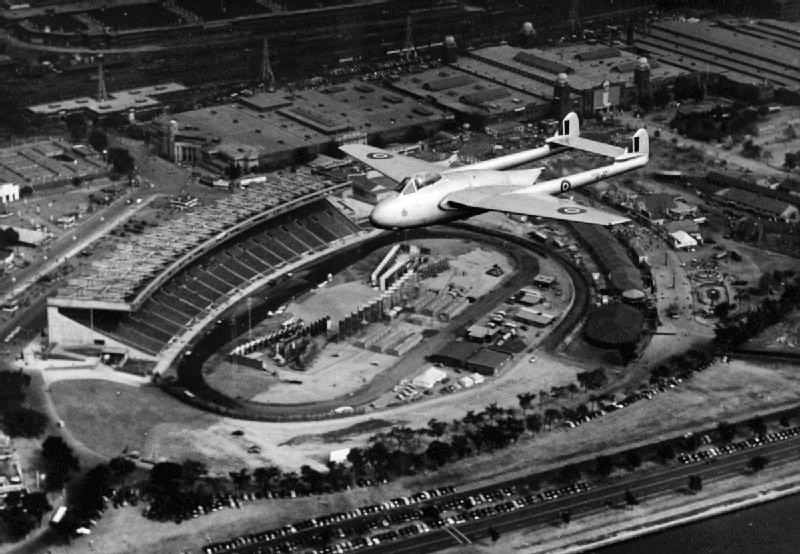
de Havilland Sea Vampire, 806 Squadron, in flight over the Exhibition Stadium, Toronto

In May 1948, 806 Squadron was re-established as the sole Royal Navy Aerobatic Team for a tour in North America. The squadron was equipped with two de Havilland Sea Hornets, which were borrowed from 801 Squadron, along with two Hawker Sea Furies and a de Havilland Sea Vampire. After embarking in the Majestic class light aircraft carrier HMCS Magnificent, the squadron disembarked to HMCS Shearwater, Dartmouth, Nova Scotia, where they performed displays in Halifax, Nova Scotia and participated in the International Air Exposition at Idlewild Airport in New York (now known as John F. Kennedy Airport). The squadron then continued to Toronto, Ontario and Ottawa, Ontario before being transported back home to disband in September.

=== Sea Hawk (1953-1960) ===
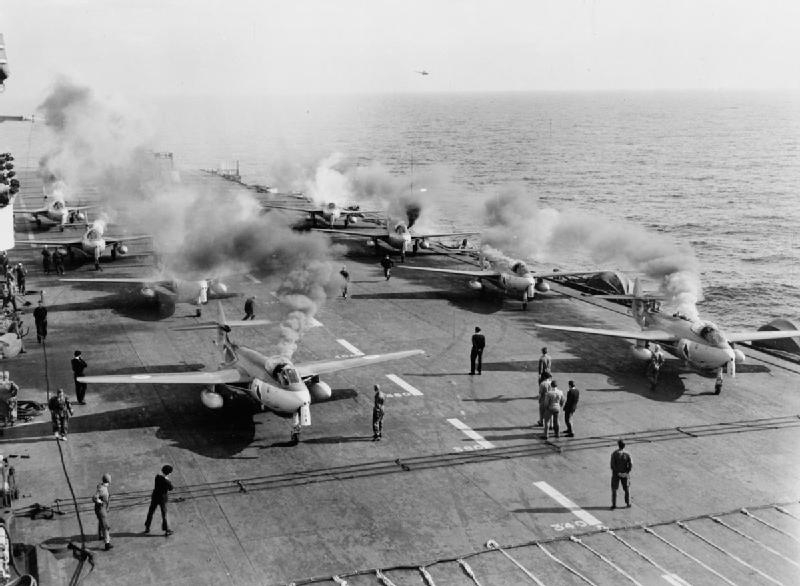
Hawker Sea Hawks of 806 Squadron firing starter cartridges on HMS Eagle

806 Naval Air Squadron reformed at RNAS Brawdy (HMS Goldcrest), Pembrokeshire, on 2 March 1953. It was equipped with Hawker Sea Hawk F.1, being the first Fleet Air Arm front-line squadron in the Fleet Air Arm to use the type. It embarked, to take part in angle-deck trials, later in 1953, on the United States Navy's aircraft carrier USS Antietam. The Hawker Sea Hawk was first introduced to the FAA squadron in 1953, replacing the Supermarine Attacker jet and the Hawker Sea Fury piston-engine fighters. The inaugural production model of the Seahawk F.1 took to the skies on 14 November 1951, while the last production variant, the FGA.6, was handed over in early 1956.

In February 1954, the squadron embarked in the Audacious-class aircraft carrier HMS Eagle for a Mediterranean cruise. Upon its return, the squadron re-equipped in July with twelve Sea Hawk FB.3s, a fighter-bomber variant that featured reinforced wings for carrying external loads. Subsequently, it joined the lead ship of her class, HMS Centaur, to return to the Mediterranean. During this deployment, the squadron was awarded the Boyd Trophy for 1955, recognising its pioneering use of the Sea Hawk at sea and its contributions to tactical research in the night strike role. In March 1955, FGA.4s were introduced, designed for close-support operations; however, the squadron was disbanded in November upon disembarking.

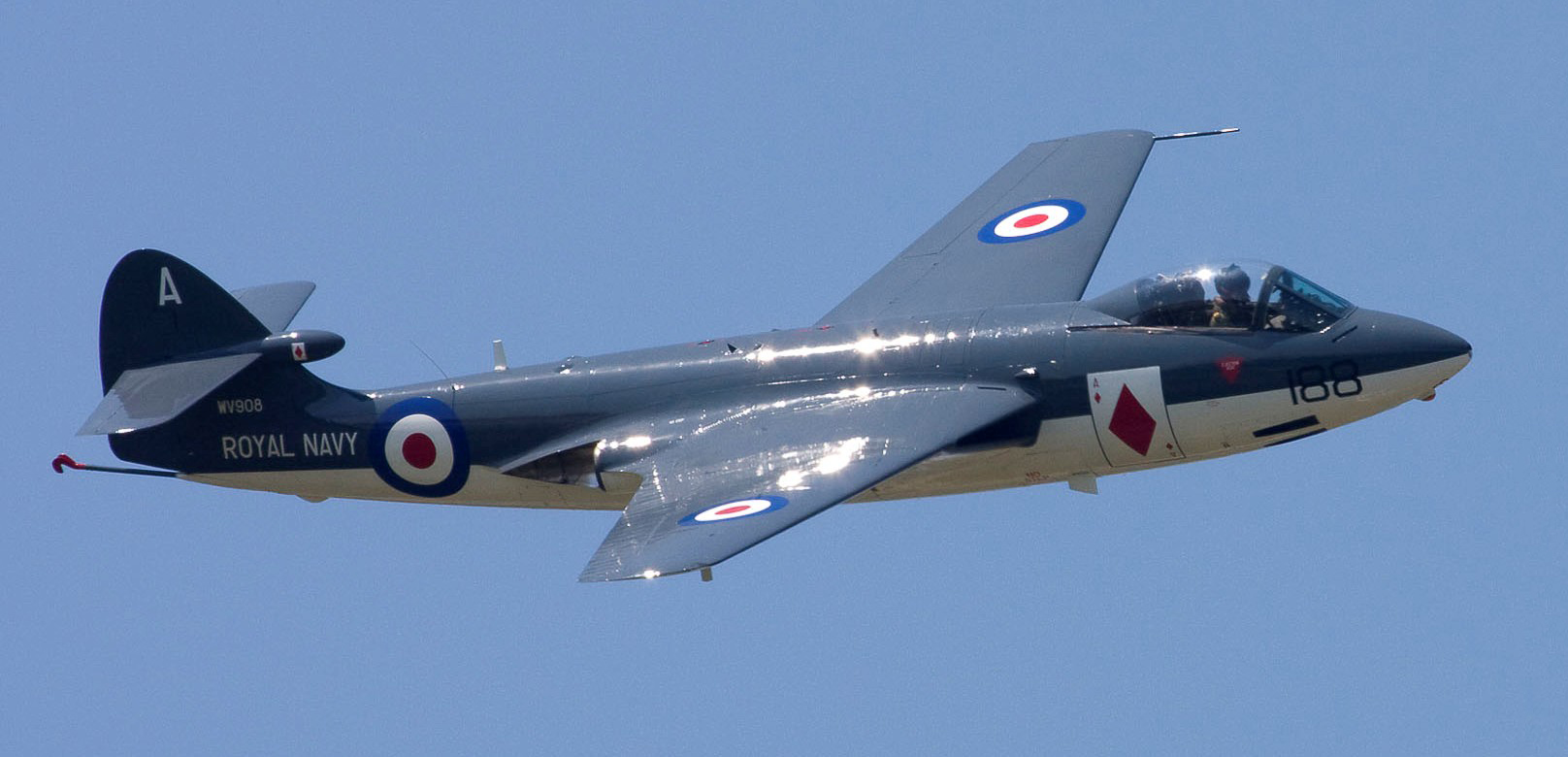
Hawker Sea Hawk FGA.6

806 Naval Air Squadron was re-established at RNAS Lossiemouth (HMS Fulmar), located in Moray, in January 1957, equipped with ten Sea Hawk FB.5s, which were a retrofitted version of the FB.3. The squadron embarked on HMS Eagle in August. In April 1958, these aircraft were replaced with FGA.6s, and the carrier departed for a Mediterranean cruise. By February 1960, the squadron had transitioned to the Centaur-class light aircraft carrier HMS Albion, which subsequently set sail for the Far East.

The squadron was also the last front-line Fleet Air Arm squadron to use the Sea Hawk, disbanding upon its return to the UK at RNAS Brawdy with the FGA.6 variant, on the 15 December 1960.

== Aircraft flown ==
The squadron has flown a number of different aircraft types, including:

- Blackburn Skua fighter-bomber (February - July 1940)
- Blackburn Roc fighter aircraft (February - July 1940)
- Fairey Fulmar Mk.I reconnaissance/fighter aircraft (June 1940 - May 1941)
- Gloster Sea Gladiator fighter aircraft (October 1940 - May 1941)
- Hawker Hurricane Mk.I fighter aircraft (May 1941 - February 1942)
- Fairey Fulmar Mk.II reconnaissance/fighter aircraft (November 1941 - January 1943)
- Grumman Martlet Mk I fighter aircraft (May - June 1942)
- Grumman Martlet Mk II fighter aircraft (June - August 1942)
- Supermarine Seafire L Mk.III fighter aircraft (August - September 1945)
- Supermarine Seafire F Mk.XV fighter aircraft (September 1945 - February 1946, May 1946 - October 1947)
- de Havilland Sea Hornet F.20 fighter aircraft (May - August 1948)
- de Havilland Sea Vampire F.20 jet fighter aircraft (May - August 1948)
- Hawker Sea Fury FB.11 fighter-bomber (May - September 1948)
- Gloster Meteor T.7 two-seat jet trainer (March - April 1953)
- Hawker Sea Hawk F.1 jet fighter aircraft (March 1953 - July 1954)
- Hawker Sea Hawk FB.3 fighter-bomber (July 1954 - May 1955)
- Hawker Sea Hawk FGA.4 fighter/ground attack aircraft (March - November 1955)
- Hawker Sea Hawk FB.5 fighter-bomber (January 1957 - April 1958)
- Hawker Sea Hawk FGA.6 fighter/ground attack aircraft (April 1958 - December 1960)

== Battle honours ==
The battle honours awarded to 806 Naval Air Squadron are:

- Norway 1940
- Dunkirk 1940
- Mediterranean 1940–41
- Libya 1940–41
- Malta Convoys 1941-42
- Matapan 1941
- Crete 1941
- Diego Suarez 1942

== Assignments ==
806 Naval Air Squadron was assigned as needed to form part of a number of larger units:

- 16th Carrier Air Group (July 1946 - October 1947)

== Commanding officers ==
List of commanding officers of 806 Naval Air Squadron:

1940 - 1942

- Lieutenant Commander C.L.G. Evans, DSC, RN, from 1 February 1940
- Lieutenant D. Vincent-Jones, DSC, RN, from 1 January 1941
- Lieutenant Commander J.N. Garnett, DSC, RN, from 12 May 1941
- Lieutenant R.L. Johnston, RN, from 23 May 1942 (KiA 12 August 19 August 1942)
- not identified, from 13 August 1942
- disbanded - 27 August 1942

1945 - 1947

- Lieutenant A.C. Lindsay, DSC, RNVR, from 1 August 1945
- Lieutenant Commander(A) A.W. Bloomer, RN, from 1 January 1946
- Lieutenant Commander R.P. Thurston, RN, from 1 October 1946 (KiFA 29 April 1947)
- Lieutenant Commander W.N. Waller, RN, from 1 June 1947
- disbanded - 6 October 1947

1948

- Lieutenant Commander D.B. Law, DSC, RN, from 3 May 1948
- disbanded - 25 September 1948

1953 - 1955

- Lieutenant Commander P.C.S. Chilton, RN, from 2 March 1953
- Lieutenant Commander D.P.W. Kelly, RN, from 24 February 1955
- disbanded - 4 November 1955

1957 - 1960

- Lieutenant Commander W.D.D. MacDonald, RN, from 14 January 1957
- Lieutenant Commander P. Carmichael, DSC, RN, from 25 April 1958
- Lieutenant Commander W.W. Illingworth, RN, from 1 October 1959
- disbanded - 15 December 1960

Note: Abbreviation (A) signifies Air Branch of the RN or RNVR.

== See also ==
- Stanley Orr - flew with 806 Naval Air Squadron during the Second World War
- Battle of Taranto - 806 Naval Air Squadron provided air cover for the task force
- Exercise Strikeback
- Royal Navy and Fleet Air Arm aerobatic teams
