= 787 Naval Air Squadron =

Inactive flying squadron of the Royal Navy's Fleet Air Arm

- Squadron badge
- Active: 1941–1956
- Disbanded: 16 January 1956
- Country: United Kingdom
- Branch: Royal Navy
- Type: Fleet Air Arm Second Line Squadron
- Role: Naval Air Fighting Development Unit
- Size: Squadron
- Part of: Fleet Air Arm
- Home station: See Naval air stations section for full list.
- Aircraft: See Aircraft flown section for full list.

Commanders
- Notable commanders: Commander Stanley Orr, DSC & Two Bars, AFC

Insignia
- Squadron Badge Description: Per fess blue and barry wavy of four white and blue, a key wards uppermost gold and a sword proper hilted gold in saltire (1952)
- Identification Markings: no markings (up to 1943); Y0A+ (from 1943)

787 Naval Air Squadron (787 NAS), sometimes called 787 Squadron, is an inactive Fleet Air Arm (FAA) naval air squadron of the United Kingdom’s Royal Navy (RN). It was last operational between March 1941 and January 1956, having initially formed at RNAS Yeovilton (HMS Heron) out of 804 Naval Air Squadron as a Fleet Fighter Development Unit.

Almost every type of fighter aircraft was received by the squadron for testing and evaluation for naval use. A move to RAF Duxford in June 1941 saw the squadron become the Naval Air Fighting Development Unit, attached to the Royal Air Force's Air Fighting Development Unit.

The squadron undertook rocket projectile test, continuous development of fighter tactics and even helping Torpedo Bomber Reconnaissance squadrons in evading fighter attack. Post Second World War it continued its trials task and also undertook Rebecca radar trials and ASH, US-built air-to-surface-vessel radar trials.

== History ==
=== Naval Air Fighting Development Unit (1941–1956) ===
787 Naval Air Squadron formed at RNAS Yeovilton (HMS Heron), in Somerset, England, on 5 March 1941 and tasked as a Fleet Fighter Development Unit. The unit formed out of 804 Naval Air Squadron and was initially equipped with five Gloster Sea Gladiator, a British biplane fighter aircraft and three Fairey Fulmar, a British carrier-borne reconnaissance and fighter aircraft. As different types of fighter aircraft were introduced for service the squadron tested and evaluated them for naval use. It would test the aircraft’s capabilities, enabling it to devise tactics for use against enemy aircraft, and part the role was comparative testing of captured aircraft, for example the squadron contrasted a Fairey Fulmar Mk.II against a Fiat CR.42 Falco, an Italian sesquiplane fighter aircraft, and a Grumman Martlett Mk I, an American carrier-based fighter aircraft, against a Messerschmitt Bf 109E, a German fighter aircraft.

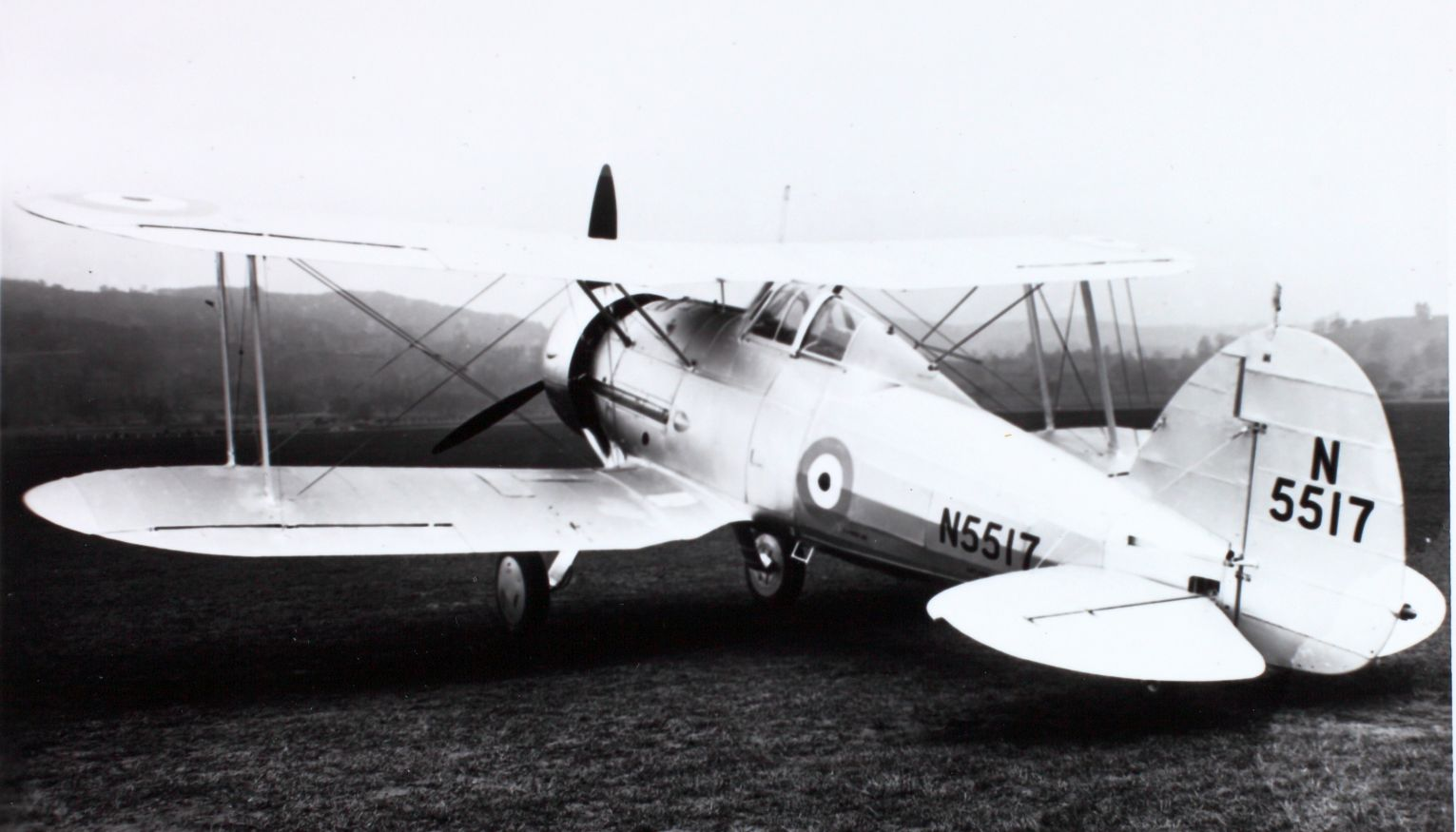
Gloster Sea Gladiator 'N5517'; an example of the type used initially by 787 Squadron

On 18 June 1941, 787 NAS moved to RAF Duxford, in Cambridgeshire, to become the Naval Air Fighting Development Unit, attached to the RAF's Air Fighting Development Unit. During January 1943 the squadron began development around the use of rocket projectiles with naval aircraft, forming a ‘Z’ Flight which operated out off RNAS St Merryn (HMS Vulture) and conducted trials at the Treligga Range, under the code-name 'Glowworm'. The RAF's Air Fighting Development Unit moved to RAF Wittering, in Cambridgeshire, and 787 NAS moved with it on 26 March 1943. It received new fighter aircraft acquiring Vought Corsair an American carrie-borne fighter aircraft, Fairey Firefly, a British carrier-borne fighter and anti-submarine aircraft, and Grumman Hellcat, an American carrier-based fighter aircraft, but was also now equipped with TBR aircraft: Fairey Barracuda a British carrier-borne torpedo and dive bomber and Grumman Avenger, an American torpedo bomber.

The squadron formed ‘Y’ Flight at RNAS Arbroath (HMS Condor), in Angus, Scotland, in June 1944, which was known as the Fighter Affiliation Unit and which was equipped with Supermarine Seafire, a navalised version of the Supermarine Spitfire fighter aircraft, and a small number of Bristol Blenheim, light bomber aircraft, with the latter being used as target aircraft. The flight travelled around, visiting various operational squadrons, demonstrating fighter tactics and in particular to the TBR units, defensive flying. July 1944 saw the disbandment of ‘Z’ Flight, however, ‘Y’ Flight continued into 1945, based firstly at RNAS Burscough (HMS Ringtail) in Lancashire from August 1944 through to November with a variety of different aircraft, then moving briefly to RNAS Ballyhalbert (HMS Corncrake), in County Down, Northern Ireland, for two weeks mid-February 1945, before relocating to RNAS Machrihanish (HMS Landrail), in Argyll and Bute, Scotland. where it disbanded (becoming 'B' Flight of 736 Naval Air Squadron at RN Air Section Speke on 1 March 1945).

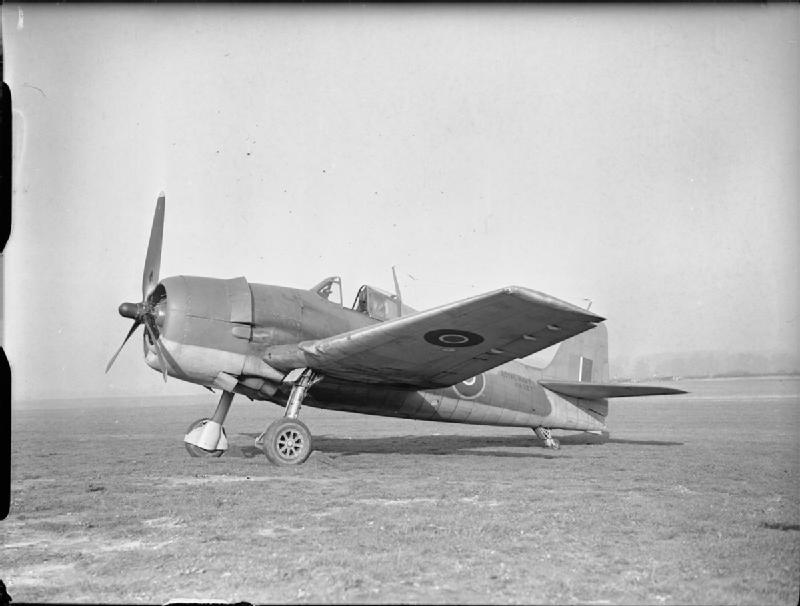
A FAA Grumman Hellcat at RAF Wittering

As well in March, 787 Naval Air Squadron moved to RAF Tangmere, in West Sussex, the new home of Air Fighting Development Unit, which then become the Air Fighting Development Squadron of the Central Fighter Establishment, while 787 Naval Air Squadron became the Air Support Development Section of the Naval Air Fighting Development Unit. It again formed an ‘X’ Flight, this time at RAF Odiham, in Hampshire and was equipped with three Grumman Hellcat fighter aircraft and an Avro Anson, a multi-role aircraft, this Flight undertook Rebecca radar trails.

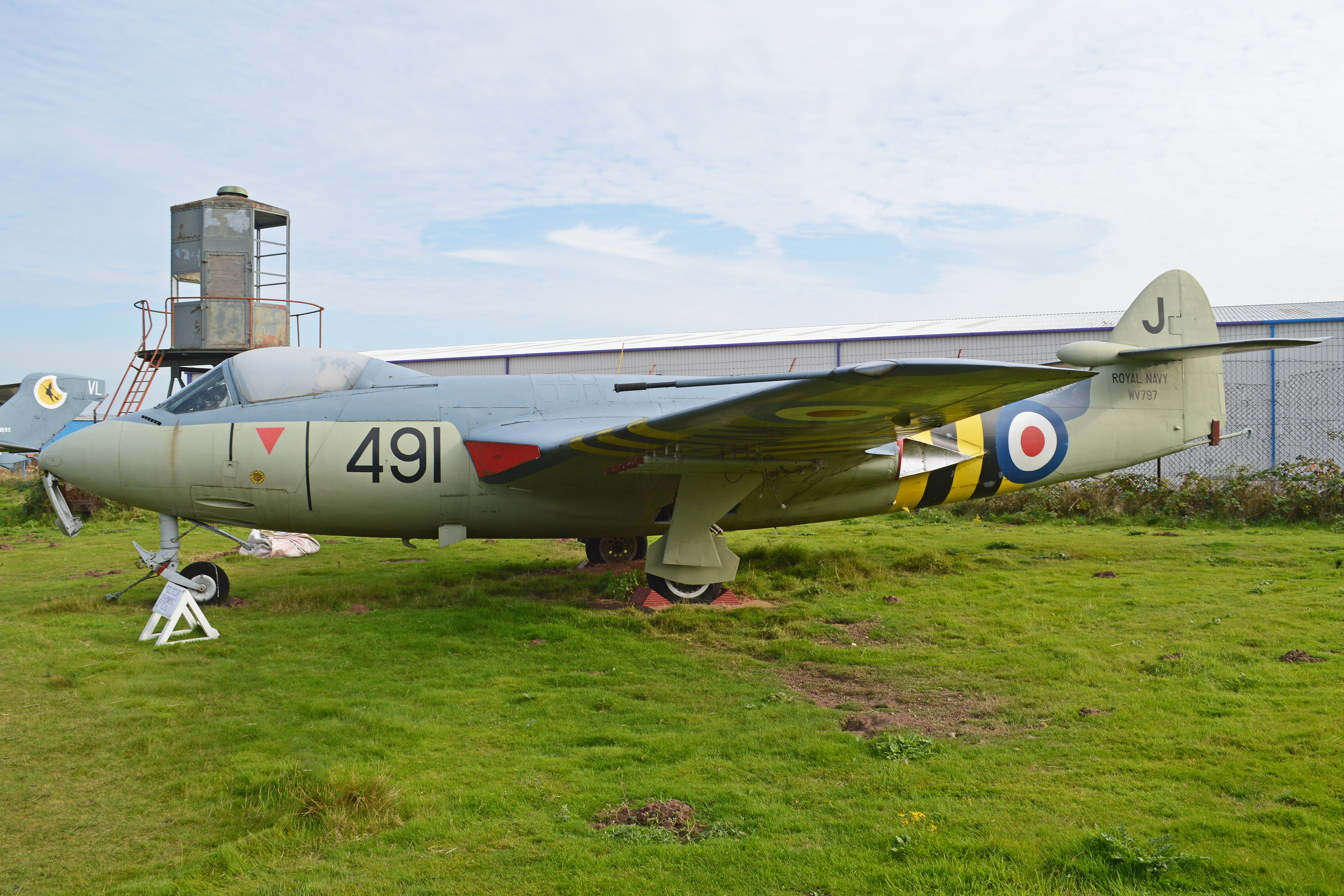
Hawker Sea Hawk FGA.6 ‘WV797 - J-491’, wearing Suez markings, saw service with 787 NAS. On display at the Midland Air Museum, Coventry Airport, UK

The squadron also had a detachment at RNAS Ford (HMS Peregrine), West Sussex, starting on 29 April 1945. It was formed of five Fairey Firefly for trials with ASH, an American air-to-surface vessel (ASV) radar. After VE Day the squadron was intended to deploy 'X' Flight to the Far East, however, the plan was cancelled following V-J Day. Following a short spell at RAF Westhampnett, in West Sussex, from July, 787 Naval Air Squadron then moved to RAF West Raynham, in Norfolk, in November, where it absorbed 746 Naval Air Squadron on 30 January 1946. The squadron continued its trials role in the years following the Second World War, successively flying de Havilland Sea Hornet, a twin-engine fighter aircraft, Hawker Sea Fury, a carrier-based fighter aircraft, de Havilland Sea Vampire, a jet fighter, Supermarine Attacker, a jet fighter, Westland Wyvern, a carrier-based multi-role strike aircraft and Hawker Sea Hawk, a jet day fighter, before disbanding in January 1956.

== Aircraft flown ==
787 Naval Air Squadron flew thirty-eight different aircraft. This amounted to around seventy different variants of aircraft. The largest was Supermarine Seafire with seven variants flown. Five variants of Grumman Martlet/Wildcat were used. Three variants of seven aircraft and two variants of eleven aircraft were also used:

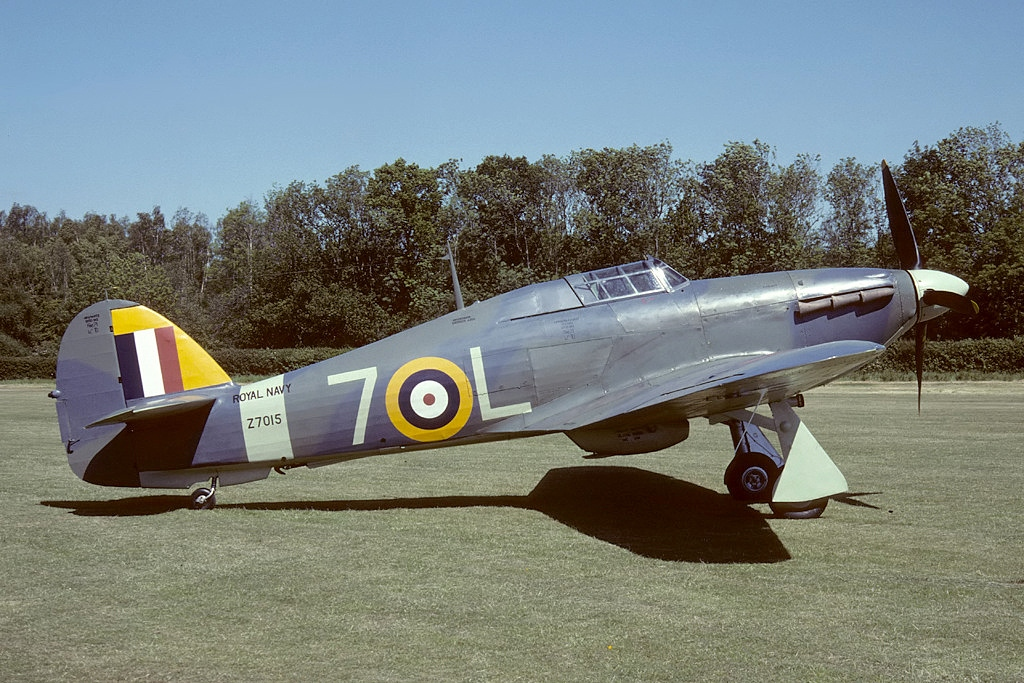
Hawker Sea Hurricane Mk 1B

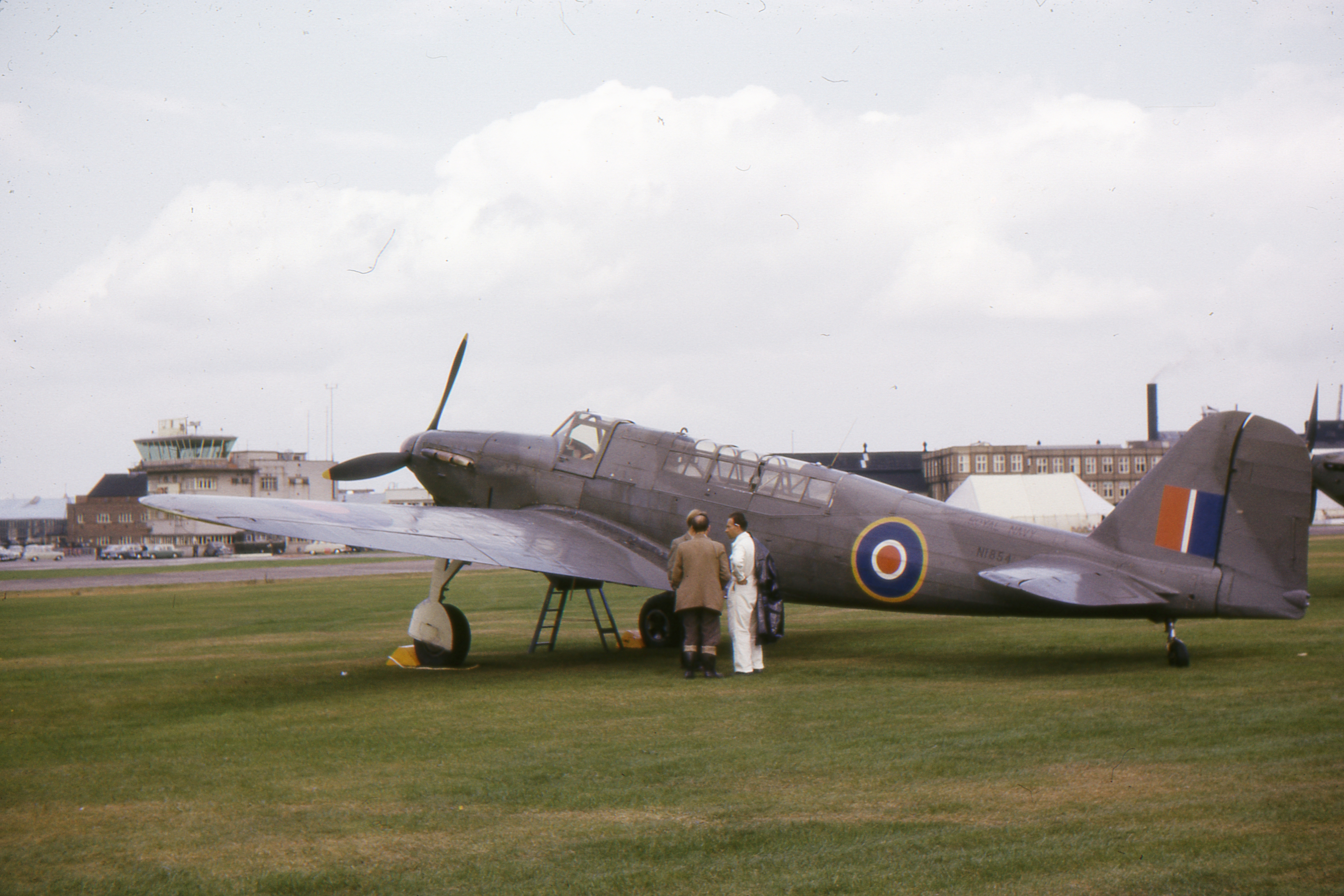
Fairey Fulmar

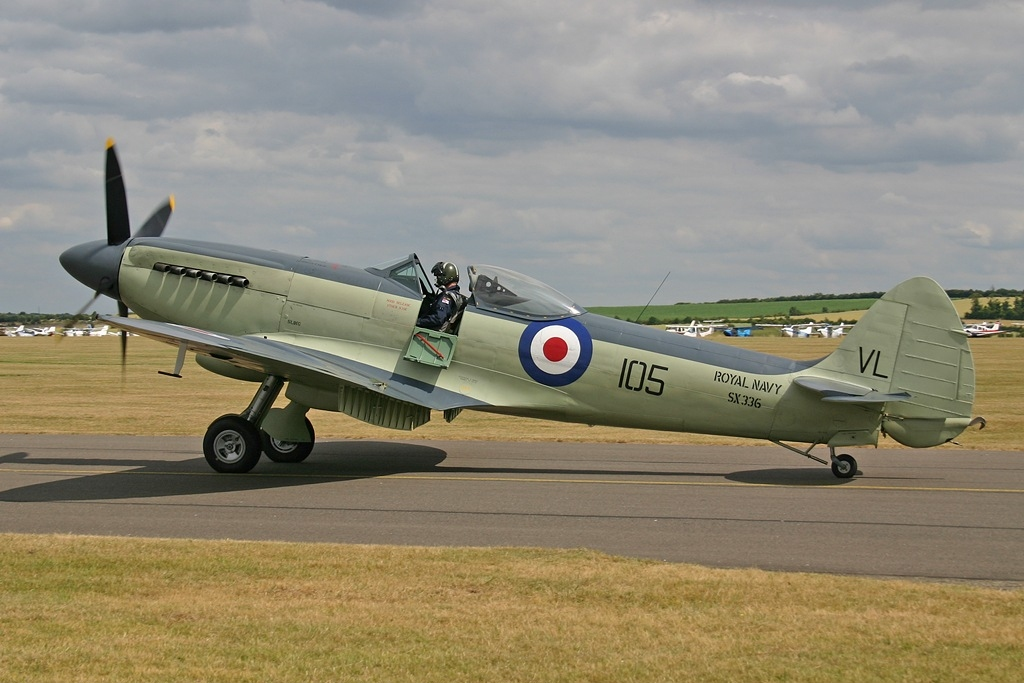
Supermarine Seafire F.XVII

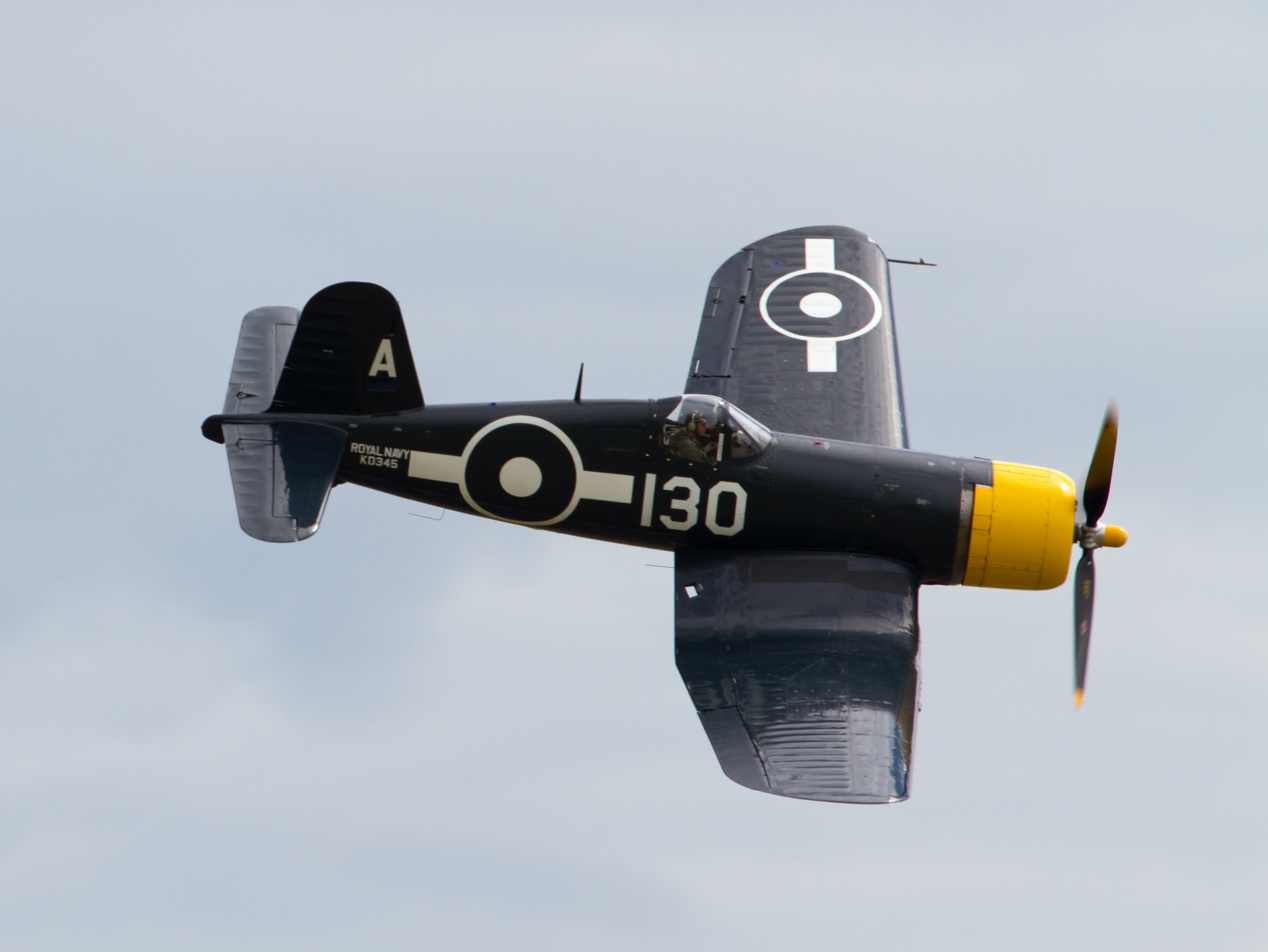
Vought Corsair

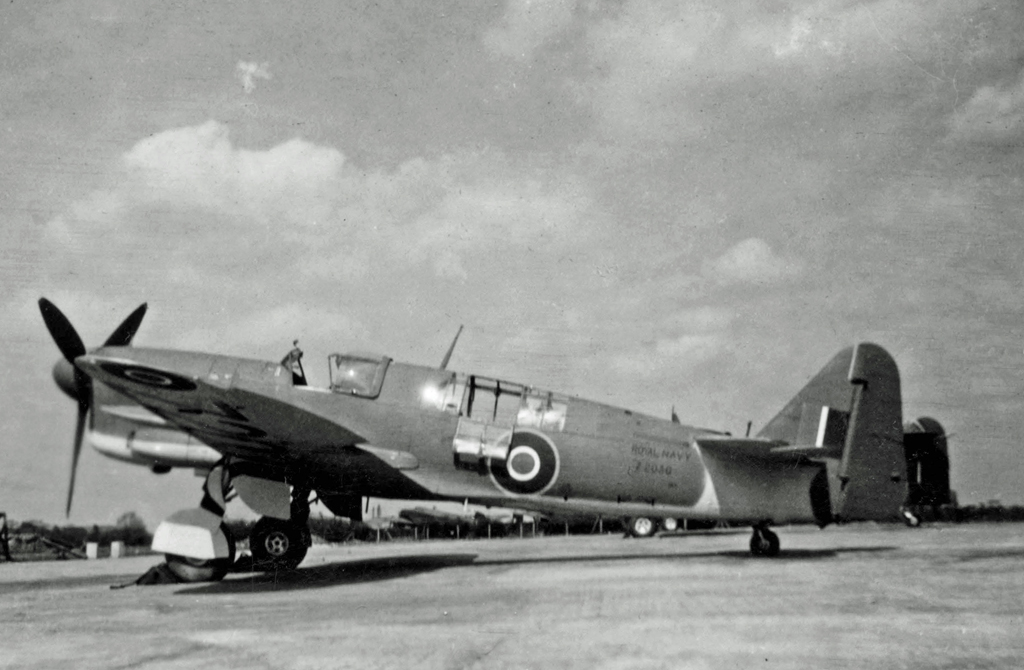
Fairey Firefly FR.1

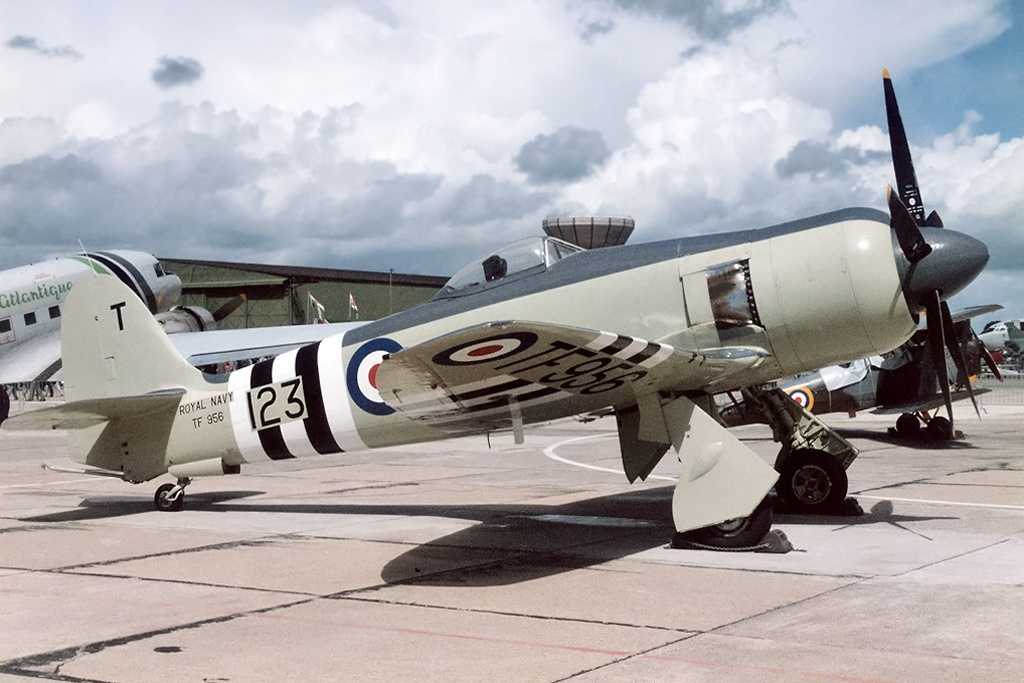
Hawker Sea Fury FB.11

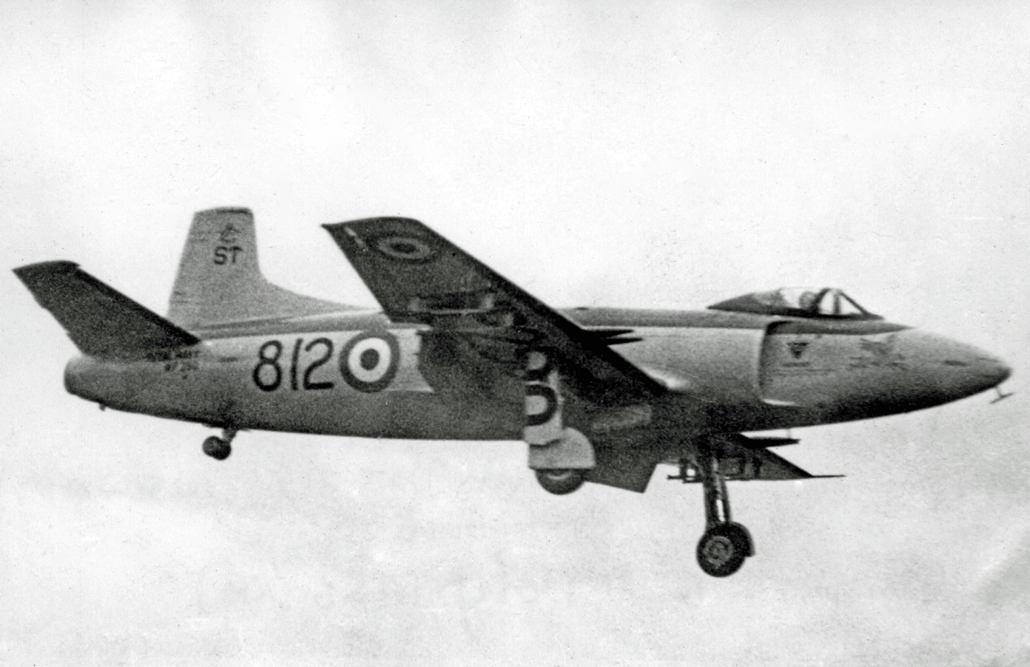
Supermarine Attacker FB.2

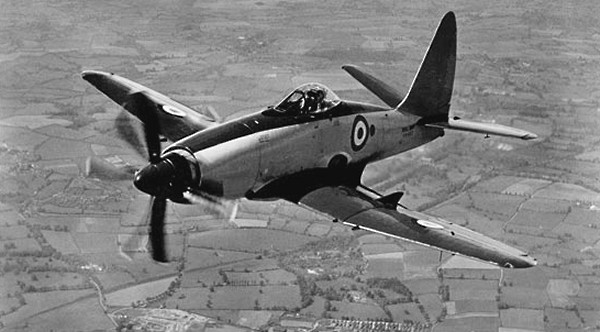
Westland Wyvern S.4

- Hawker Sea Hurricane Mk IA fighter aircraft (March 1941 - )
- Miles Whitney Straight twin-seat cabin monoplane (March 1941 - )
- Vought Chesapeake Mk.I dive bomber (July 1941 - )
- Gloster Sea Gladiator biplane fighter aircraft (March 1941 - November 1942)
- Blackburn Skua dive bomber / fighter aircraft (March 1941 - March 1942)
- Grumman Martlet Mk I fighter aircraft (March 1941 - March 1943)
- Fairey Fulmar Mk.I reconnaissance/fighter aircraft (March 1941 - November 1943)
- Hawker Sea Hurricane Mk IB fighter aircraft (July 1941 - September 1943)
- Fairey Fulmar Mk.II reconnaissance/fighter aircraft (November 1941 - April 1944)
- Blackburn Roc fighter aircraft (October 1941)
- Grumman Martlet Mk II fighter aircraft (January 1942 - )
- Supermarine Spitfire Mk Vb fighter aircraft (March 1942)
- Fairey Albacore torpedo bomber (May 1942 - March 1943)
- de Havilland Dominie short-haul airliner (May 1942 - October 1945, April 1954 - January 1956)
- Vought Kingfisher observation floatplane (June - July 1942)
- Supermarine Seafire Mk Ib fighter aircraft (July 1942 - August 1944)
- Supermarine Walrus amphibious maritime patrol aircraft (September - December 1942)
- Percival Q.6 Petrel six-seat military communications aircraft (October 1942 - May 1944)
- Grumman Martlet Mk IV fighter aircraft (October 1942 - August 1943)
- Bristol Blenheim Mk.I light bomber (October 1942 - February 1944)
- Supermarine Seafire L Mk IIc fighter aircraft (November 1942 - March 1945)
- Percival Proctor IA radio trainer / communications aircraft (January - July 1943)
- Bristol Blenheim Mk.IV light bomber (March 1943 - May 1945)
- Fairey Barracuda I torpedo / dive bomber (April - June 1943)
- Hawker Sea Hurricane Mk IIc fighter aircraft (April 1943 - September 1944)
- Grumman Hellcat F. Mk. I fighter aircraft (May 1943 - March 1945)
- Grumman Tarpon GR.I torpedo bomber (May 1943 - April 1945)
- Fairey Barracuda Mk II torpedo / dive bomber (May 1943 - June 1945)
- Vought Corsair Mk I fighter aircraft (July - August 1943)
- Grumman Wildcat Mk V fighter aircraft (July 1943 - March 1945)
- Vought Corsair Mk III fighter aircraft (July 1943 - November 1945)
- Fairey Firefly I fighter anti-submarine aircraft (August 1943 - June 1945)
- Stinson Reliant liaison and training aircraft (December 1943 - November 1945)
- Supermarine Seafire Mk III fighter aircraft (December 1943 - June 1946)
- Vought Corsair Mk II fighter aircraft (April 1944 - November 1945)
- Grumman Wildcat Mk VI fighter aircraft (May 1944 - September 1945)
- Douglas Dauntless scout plane / dive bomber (July - October 1944)
- Grumann Avenger Mk.II torpedo bomber (September 1944 - February 1945)
- Grumman Hellcat F Mk. II fighter aircraft (September 1944 - November 1945)
- Supermarine Seafire F.Mk.XV fighter aircraft (September 1944 - June 1946)
- Beech Traveller I utility aircraft (November 1944)
- Fairey Swordfish I torpedo bomber (January 1945)
- Grumman Avenger Mk.III torpedo bomber (January 1945 - October 1947)
- Supermarine Spitfire Mk 21 fighter aircraft (January - June 1945)
- Grumman Tigercat heavy fighter (February - April 1945)
- Supermarine Seafire F.Mk.XVII fighter aircraft (April 1945 - January 1948)
- Avro Anson Mk I multi-role aircraft (September 1945 - September 1946)
- Grumman Hellcat N.F. Mk II night fighter version (January - May 1946)
- de Havilland Sea Mosquito TR Mk.33 multirole combat aircraft (March - December 1946)
- Supermarine Seafire F Mk 45 fighter aircraft (March 1946 - February 1947)
- Airspeed Oxford training aircraft (May 1946 - March 1954)
- de Havilland Mosquito FB Mk. VI multirole combat aircraft (December 1946 - May 1948)
- de Havilland Sea Hornet F.20 fighter aircraft (March 1947 - March 1950)
- Blackburn Firebrand T.F. IV strike fighter (April - October 1947)
- Fairey Firefly FR.Mk 4 fighter and anti-submarine aircraft (April 1947 - January 1949)
- Hawker Sea Fury F.10 fighter aircraft (May 1947 - July 1948)
- Supermarine Seafire FR Mk 47 fighter aircraft (May 1947 - September 1949)
- de Havilland Vampire F.1 jet fighter (September 1947 - February 1950)
- Hawker Sea Fury T.20 two-seat training version (1949)
- de Havilland Sea Vampire F.20 jet fighter (February 1949 - April 1951)
- Hawker Sea Fury FB.11 fighter-bomber aircraft (February 1949 - March 1954)
- de Havilland Sea Hornet PR.22 photo reconnaissance version (August 1949)
- de Havilland Vampire FB.5 jet fighter-bomber (September 1949 - August 1953)
- Hawker Sea Hawk F1 jet day fighter (May 1953 - November 1954)
- Supermarine Attacker F1 naval jet fighter (January 1951 - April 1952)
- Supermarine Attacker FB.2 fighter bomber variant (September 1952 - September 1954)
- Westland Wyvern S.4 multi-role strike aircraft (April - November 1954)
- Hawker Sea Hawk FB 3 fighter-bomber variant (July 1954 - October 1955)
- Hawker Sea Hawk FGA 4 Fighter/Ground attack (November 1954 - January 1956)
- de Havilland Sea Venom FAW.21 jet fighter-bomber (May 1955 - January 1956)

=== 787X Flight ===
X Flight, 787 Naval Air Squadron, operated a variety of different aircraft and versions.

- Avro Anson Mk I multi-role aircraft (March - May 1945)
- Grumman Hellcat F. Mk. I fighter aircraft (March - May 1945)

=== 787Y Flight ===
Y Flight, 787 Naval Air Squadron, operated a variety of different aircraft and versions.

- Bristol Blenheim Mk.IV light bomber (May 1944 - February 1945)
- de Havilland Dominie short-haul airliner (May 1944 - February 1945)
- Supermarine Seafire Mk Ib fighter aircraft (June - October 1944)
- Supermarine Seafire L Mk IIc fighter aircraft (June - October 1944)
- Supermarine Seafire Mk III fighter aircraft (May 1944 - February 1945)

=== 787Z Flight ===
Z Flight, 787 Naval Air Squadron, operated a variety of different aircraft and versions.

- Fairey Fulmar Mk.I reconnaissance/fighter aircraft (April 1943 - )
- Fairey Fulmar Mk.II reconnaissance/fighter aircraft (January 1944)
- Hawker Hurricane Mk.IV fighter aircraft (June - November 1943)
- Hawker Sea Hurricane Mk IA fighter aircraft (May 1943 - June 1944)
- Hawker Sea Hurricane Mk IIc fighter aircraft (November 1943 - )
- Fairey Swordfish I torpedo bomber (March 1943 - June 1944)
- Fairey Swordfish II torpedo bomber (January 1943 - )

== Naval air stations / Royal Air Force stations ==
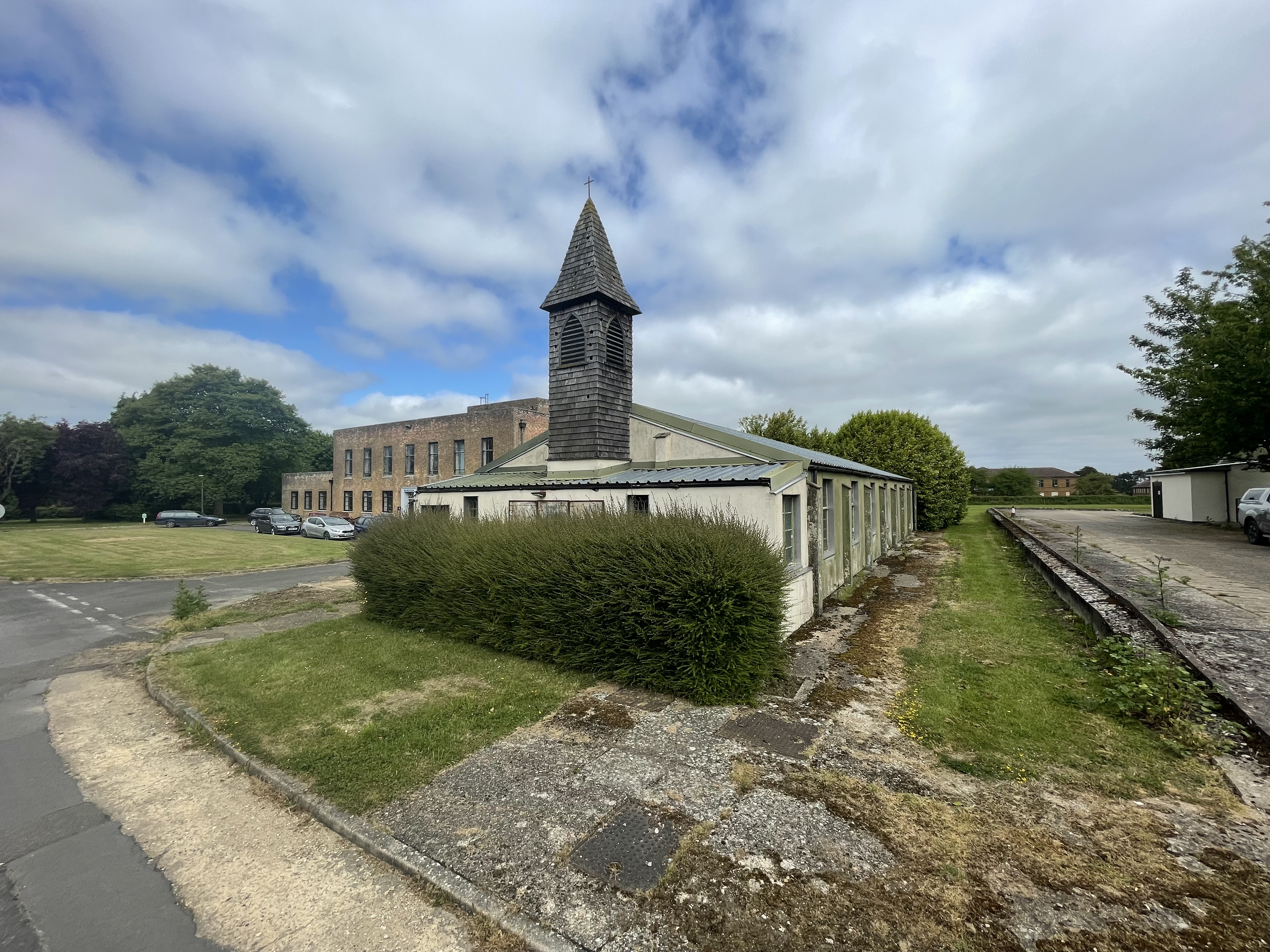
Buildings at the former RAF West Raynham

787 Naval Air Squadron operated from a number of naval air stations of the Royal Navy and Royal Air Force stations in Scotland, Wales and England:

- Royal Naval Air Station Yeovilton (HMS Heron), Somerset, (5 March 1941 - 18 June 1941)
- Royal Air Force Duxford, Cambridgeshire, (18 June 1941 - 26 March 1943)
  - Royal Naval Air Station Machrihanish (HMS Landrail), Argyll and Bute, (detachment 9 - 27 March 1943)
- Royal Air Force Wittering, Cambridgeshire, (26 March 1943 - 17 March 1945)
- Royal Air Force Tangmere, Sussex, (17 March 1945 - 12 July 1945)
  - RN Air Section Ford, Sussex, (detachment 29 April 1945 - )
- Royal Air Force Westhampnett, Sussex, (12 July 1945 - 16 November 1945)
  - Royal Air Force Tangmere, Sussex, (detachment 27 October - 5 November 1945)
- Royal Air Force West Raynham, Norfolk, (16 November 1945 - 16 January 1956)
  - Royal Air Force St Davids, Pembrokeshire, (detachment 22 April - 24 July 1952)
- disbanded - 16 January 1956

=== 787X Flight ===
X Flight, 787 Naval Air Squadron, operated from a Royal Air Force station:

- Royal Air Force Odiham, Hampshire, (1 March 1945 - 4 June 1945)
- disbanded - 4 June 1945

=== 787Y Flight ===
Y Flight, 787 Naval Air Squadron, operated from a number of naval air stations of the Royal Navy and a Royal Air Force station:

- Royal Naval Air Station Arbroath (HMS Condor), Angus, (12 June 1944 - 6 August 1944)
- Royal Naval Air Station Burscough (HMS Ringtail), Lancashire, (6 August 1944 - 12 November 1944)
- RN Air Section Speke, Merseyside, (12 November 1944 - 15 January 1945)
- Royal Naval Air Station Machrihanish (HMS Landrail), Argyll and Bute, (15 January 1945 - 7 February 1945)
- Royal Naval Air Station Ballyhalbert (HMS Corncrake), County Down, (7 February 1945 - 20 February 1945)
- Royal Naval Air Station Machrihanish (HMS Landrail), Argyll and Bute, (20 February 1945 - 1 March 1945)
- disbanded - 1 March 1945

=== 787Z Flight ===
Z Flight, 787 Naval Air Squadron, operated from a number of naval air stations of the Royal Navy:

- Royal Naval Air Station Lee-on-Solent (HMS (Daedalus), Hampshire, 15 January 1943 - 24 February 1943)
- Royal Naval Air Station St Merryn (HMS Vulture), Cornwall, (24 February 1943 - 16 November 1943)
- Royal Naval Air Station Inskip (HMS Nightjar), Lancashire, (16 November 1943 - 14 January 1944)
- Royal Naval Air Station St Merryn (HMS Vulture), Cornwall, (14 January 1944 - 1 July 1944)
  - Royal Naval Air Station Inskip (HMS Nightjar), Lancashire, (detachment 4 - 16 April 1944)
- disbanded - 1 July 1944

== Commanding officers ==
List of commanding officers of 787 Naval Air Squadron with date of appointment:

- Lieutenant Commander B.H.M. Kendall RN, from 5 March 1941 (Commander 1 October 1944)
- Lieutenant Commander(A) R.E. Bibby, DSO, RNVR, from 12 November 1944
- Lieutenant Commander G.R. Callingham, RN, from 5 September 1945
- Commander R.A. Kilroy, DSC, RN, from 6 May 1946
- Lieutenant Commander P.E.I. Bailey, RN, from 3 December 1946
- Commander R.J.H. Stephens, RN, from 11 February 1947
- Commander E.A. Shaw, RN, from 21 April 1948
- Lieutenant Commander B.H.C. Nation, RN, from 16 May 1950
- Lieutenant Commander W.I. Campbell, RN, from 24 September 1951
- Lieutenant Commander R.L. Eveleigh, RN, from 7 January 1953
- Lieutenant Commander S.G. Orr, DSC & Two Bars, AFC, RN, from 4 March 1953
- Lieutenant Commander R.E. Bourke, RAN, from 15 August 1953
- Lieutenant Commander P.J. Hutton, RN, from 8 October 1953
- Lieutenant Commander R.D. Taylor, RN, from 1 January 1954 (KIFA 19 March 1954)
- Lieutenant Commander R.E. Bourke, RAN, from 20 March 1954
- Lieutenant Commander R.A. Shilcock, RN, from 24 July 1954
- disbanded - 16 January 1956

=== 787X Flight ===
List of commanding officers of X Flight, 787 Naval Air Squadron, with date of appointment:

- Lieutenant(A) R.J. Srurges, RNVR, from 1 March 1945
- disbanded - 4 June 1945

=== 787Y Flight ===
List of commanding officers of Y Flight, 787 Naval Air Squadron, with date of appointment:

- Lieutenant Commander(A) R.E. Bibby, DSO, RNVR, from 28 July 1944
- disbanded - 1 March 1945

=== 787Z Flight ===
List of commanding officers of Z Flight, 787 Naval Air Squadron, with date of appointment:

- Lieutenant(A) G. Hamilton-Bates, RNVR, from 15 January 1943 (Lieutenant Commander 30 September 1943)
- Lieutenant(A) T.G. Davison, RNVR, from 6 June 1944
- disbanded - 1 July 1944

Note: Abbreviation (A) signifies Air Branch of the RN or RNVR.
