= Charles Evans (Royal Navy officer) =

Royal Navy Vice Admiral (1908–1981)

Vice-Admiral Sir Charles Evans KCB CBE DSO DSC
- Born: 2 August 1908
- Died: 27 December 1981 (aged 73)
- Military career
- Allegiance: United Kingdom
- Branch: Royal Navy
- Service years: c.1922–1962
- Rank: Flying Officer (RAF); Vice-Admiral (RN)
- Commands: Royal Naval Barracks, Portsmouth; 806 Naval Air Squadron
- Conflicts: World War II; Korean War
- Awards: Knight Commander of the Order of the Bath; Commander of the Order of the British Empire; Distinguished Service Order; Distinguished Service Cross; Mentioned in dispatches

Vice-Admiral Sir Charles Leo Glandore Evans, KCB, CBE, DSO, DSC (2 August 1908 – 27 December 1981) was a Royal Navy officer who served as Deputy Supreme Allied Commander Atlantic from 1960 until his retirement in 1962.

== Naval career ==
Evans initially joined the Royal Navy and was given a temporary commission as a flying officer in the Royal Air Force in 1931.

Evans served in the Second World War as Commanding Officer of 806 Naval Air Squadron based at HMS Sparrowhawk carrying out bombing attacks on targets around Bergen in Norway in May 1940 and providing cover for the Dunkirk evacuation the following month. He continued his war service with HMS Formidable in the Mediterranean, before becoming Commander of Flying on HMS Implacable in the Pacific in 1945.

Evans was appointed Director of the Naval Air Division in 1950, served as Captain of HMS Ocean during the Korean War and then became Commander of the Royal Naval Barracks, Portsmouth in 1954 before being appointed Flag Officer, Flying Training in 1956. He went on to be Flag Officer, Aircraft Carriers in 1959 and Deputy Supreme Allied Commander Atlantic in 1960 before retiring in 1962.

Military offices
Preceded by Sir Wilfrid Woods	Deputy Supreme Allied Commander Atlantic; 1960–1962	Succeeded by Sir Richard Smeeton
