= HMCS Shearwater =

Several Canadian naval units have been named HMCS Shearwater.

- HMCS Shearwater (K02), a commissioned sloop and later submarine tender in the Royal Canadian Navy from 1914 to 1919
- CFB Shearwater, a Canadian Forces Base formerly commissioned as a shore establishment of the Royal Canadian Navy from 1948 to 1968

== See also ==
- HMS Shearwater
