= Stanley Orr =

Flying Ace and Royal Navy Commander 1916-2003

Stanley Gordon Orr
- Born: 28 September 1916; London
- Died: 11 August 2003 (aged 86); Fareham, Hampshire
- Military career
- Allegiance: United Kingdom
- Branch: Royal Navy
- Service years: 1939–1966
- Rank: Commander
- Nickname: "Stan"
- Unit: Fleet Air Arm
- Commands: 896 Naval Air Squadron; 804 Naval Air Squadron; 761 Naval Air Squadron; Naval Test Squadron; Hovercraft trials unit
- Conflicts: Second World War; Korean War
- Awards: Distinguished Service Cross & Two Bars; Air Force Cross; Mentioned in Despatches
- Other work: Marine superintendent, Vospers

Stanley Gordon Orr, DSC & Two Bars, AFC (28 September 1916 – 11 August 2003) was the highest scoring fighter ace of the Royal Navy during the Second World War. Flying with the Fleet Air Arm he was credited with the destruction of 17 aircraft. His success was recognised by the awards of the Distinguished Service Cross and Two Bars, an Air Force Cross and a Mention in Despatches.

Orr took part in campaigns over Norway and Dunkirk in 1940 and then moved to the Mediterranean aboard HMS Illustrious. During this time he was involved in the Battle of Taranto, the defence of Malta, the Battle of Cape Matapan, and land based operations in Egypt. Later in the war in 1944, he was involved in the attack on the German battleship Tirpitz. At the end of the Second World War he remained in the navy, becoming a test pilot at the Empire Test Pilots' School. He saw further action during the Korean War, when he served aboard HMS Ocean as Commander (flying). His last job in the navy was in command of the Hovercraft trials unit. Upon leaving the Royal Navy in 1966, he became a marine superintendent at Vospers.

== Early life ==
Stanley Gordon Orr was born on 28 September 1916, in London, England. The son of a stockbroker, he was educated at Paxton Park boarding school until the Wall Street crash left his father in financial difficulties; he then attended the Regent Street Polytechnic and started an apprenticeship at Humber. Leaving Humber after two years he joined Vale Engineering, which produced sports cars. His interest in flying started in 1936 when he was employed by Handley Page working on the prototypes for the Hampden and Halifax bombers. In 1939 he applied to join the Royal Air Force but was turned down after failing a medical eyesight test. Soon after, he successfully passed the same test in the same room but with a different doctor and joined the Fleet Air Arm of the Royal Navy.

== Second World War ==
Having been accepted by the Royal Navy Volunteer Reserve and holding the rank of sub-lieutenant, Orr gained his naval skills and learnt how to fly while serving on the old First World War vintage carrier HMS Argus. As a qualified pilot, he attended the air gunnery school before being posted to 759 Naval Air Squadron at Eastleigh, Hampshire, in February 1940. At Eastleigh, he was trained on the Navy's fighter aircraft: the two seater Blackburn Skua dual fighter–dive bomber and the single seat Sea Gladiator biplane.

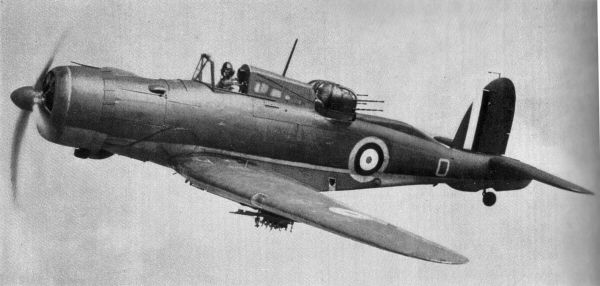
Blackburn Roc two seater turret fighter

Stanley Gordon Orr married Myra Page in 1940. His first operational posting came in May 1940 when he joined 806 Naval Air Squadron, which was based at Hatston in the Orkney Islands. (Note: Posted in at the same time were future aces Jackie Sewell (13 victories) and Graham Hogg (12 victories).) The squadron was equipped with the Blackburn Skua and Blackburn Roc, another two seater fighter, and at the time was tasked with attacking German shipping and oil storage facilities in Norway. Later, the squadron was moved to RAF Detling, in Kent, to provide air cover for Operation Dynamo, the evacuation of the British Expeditionary Force from Dunkirk. In June, 806 Squadron was converted to fly the Fairey Fulmar, another two seater fighter, and was posted to the air group on the newly commissioned aircraft carrier HMS Illustrious.

=== Mediterranean ===
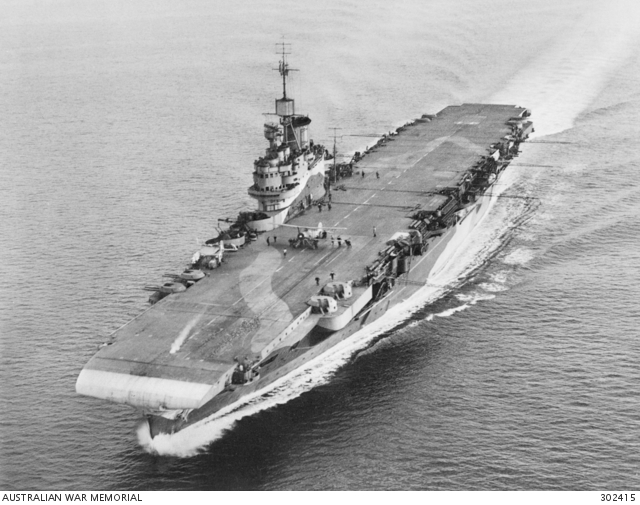
HMS Illustrious

Illustrious left Scapa Flow in August and arrived in the Mediterranean by September. Orr became an ace in the following months, claiming seven aircraft shot down out of 30 claimed by his squadron. Orr's victories included a CANT Z.501 flying boat on 2 September and on 4 September off the Dodecanese he shared in the shooting down of a Savoia-Marchetti SM.81 bomber. One of the first larger missions Orr took part in was providing the fighter cover for the Fairey Swordfish attack on the Italian fleet at Taranto. Other missions included attacks on German army positions at Bardia, bombing Tripoli in Libya, and attacks on the Rhodes airfields. Orr was also awarded his first Distinguished Service Cross (DSC) for his service during these missions.

On 10 January 1941, Orr and Sub-Lieutenant Graham Hogg observed two Savoia-Marchetti SM.79s making a torpedo bombing run on Illustrious; after a long chase they managed to shoot one of them down. The Italian planes, however, had just been a diversion, because at the same time three squadrons of Junkers Ju 87 dive bombers from Sturzkampfgeschwader 1 and Sturzkampfgeschwader 2 arrived over the carrier. The Ju 87s were circling the fleet at 11,000 ft (3,400 m), out of the range of the navy's anti-aircraft guns. They then targeted the carrier, diving down and hitting her six times. Orr, down at sea level and out of ammunition, climbed up through the carrier's anti-aircraft barrage in an attempt to disrupt the dive-bombers' attack. With Illustrious damaged and unable to land her remaining seven Fairey Fulmar fighters, the aircraft were ordered to land at RAF Hal Far on Malta.

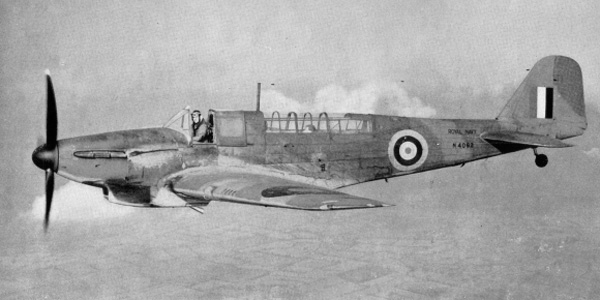
Fairey Fulmar two seater fighter

From RAF Hal Far, 806 Naval Air Squadron provided air cover for Malta and Illustrious which was berthed in the Grand Harbour at Valletta, under repair. On 5 February Orr shot down a Junkers Ju 88 that was bombing the city. In total, flying in the defence of Malta, Orr added five more victories to his record and was awarded a second DSC. The damage to Illustrious could not be repaired at Malta so she was sent to the United States for repairs. Meanwhile, 806 Naval Air Squadron remained in the Mediterranean, joining another Illustrious-class aircraft carrier, HMS Formidable.

On board Formidable, Orr's squadron provided the fighter cover for her Fairey Albacores and Fairey Swordfish during the Battle of Cape Matapan in March 1941 and the bombing of Tripoli. Orr shot down a Ju 88 during this time. Another victory followed on 21 April. Flying over Tripoli, Orr and Sub-Lieutenant Graham Hogg forced a Dornier Do 24n flying boat down with its engine on fire. Each time it tried to take off again the pair carried out another attack until it eventually sank. When Formidable was put out of action by German Ju 87 dive bombers, 806 Naval Air Squadron was again sent to operate from land. This time they were based at the naval Dekheila Airfield near Alexandria in Egypt and, at the same time, were re-formed with Hawker Hurricane fighters. In June, the squadron took part in operations against the Vichy French in Palestine.

=== United States ===
In August 1941 Orr, having spent 18 months on operations, returned home and became a flying instructor at RNAS Yeovilton. A year later in August 1942, he was sent along with 80 officers and men to the United States to form 896 Naval Air Squadron. The squadron was equipped with Grumman Martlets at Norfolk, Virginia and then joined HMS Victorious. (Note: Martlet was the British name for the Grumman F4F Wildcat. Later in the war they changed the aircraft's name to Wildcat in RN service.) A shortage in American aircraft carriers resulted in the lending of Victorious to the United States Pacific Fleet where she was known by the alias USS Robin and her aircraft were repainted with American markings. Orr was prevented from joining them in the Pacific when he contracted polio in March 1943. He spent 10 weeks at Pearl Harbor in an iron lung before making a complete recovery and was later sent home to Britain.

=== 804 Squadron ===
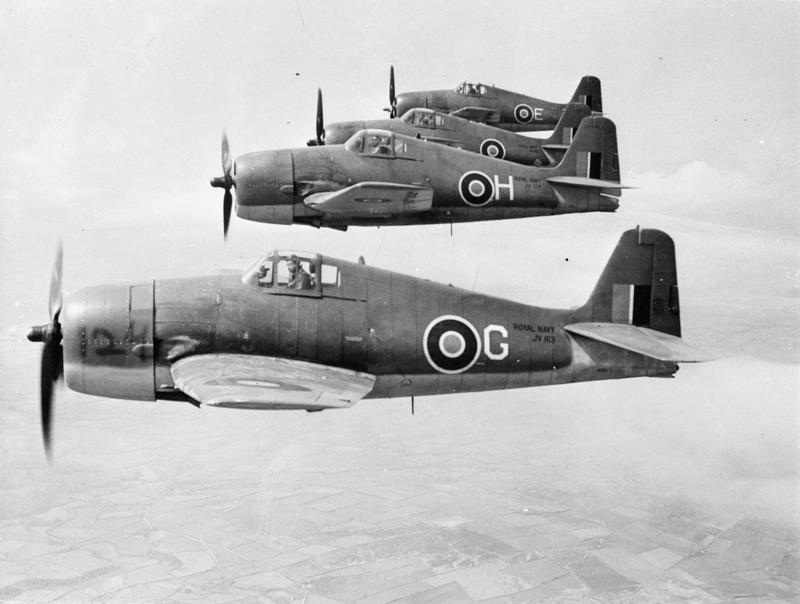
Grumman Hellcats in Royal Navy service

On his return, Orr feared he would be grounded but in August 1943 he was given a new command—804 Naval Air Squadron, which at the time was land based at RNAS Eglinton (HMS Gannet) in Northern Ireland and equipped with the Grumman Hellcat. (Note: Orr liked the Hellcat and went on record stating: "The Hellcat was without doubt the best, and most popular, naval fighter of the period. It suffered none of the Corsair's stall and visibility problems, being an easy aircraft both to fly and to deck land. It bestowed upon its pilot immense confidence, which was an important thing in those days, as you usually had your hands full coping with the enemy!") With his new squadron Orr joined HMS Emperor, an American built Ruler-class escort carrier, in December. Emperor was involved in convoy escort duties and in the spring of 1944, the squadron started attacking German shipping off the Norwegian coast.

The presence of the German battleship Tirpitz in Altafjord in Norway was a constant threat to the Arctic convoys and required the Royal Navy to retain a large aircraft carrier force with the Home Fleet to conduct operations along the Norwegian coast and to provide cover for these convoys. In March 1944 the fleet formed a large strike force in an attempt to destroy the Tirpitz in Operation Tungsten. The force included the fleet carriers HMS Furious and HMS Victorious, which were tasked with carrying the main strike force of Fairey Barracudas and Vought F4U Corsairs, while the main fighter force was provided by the escort carriers Emperor, which was equipped with Grumman Hellcats, together with HMS Searcher and HMS Pursuer, carrying Grumman Wildcats.

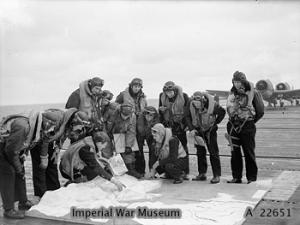
804 Squadron pilots planning the attack on the German battleship Tirpitz.

Orr, who was in command of the second strike group, remembered: "Upon arrival over Tirpitz it was found that the smoke screen generated by the Germans had ridden half way up the mountains on either side of the Kaafjord. Each flight attacked their pre-briefed gun sites once it was clear that no enemy fighters were in the area. The Hellcat proved itself to be an excellent gun platform on this mission." For his part with this operation, Orr was awarded the second Bar to his DSC. A mixed formation of 18 aircraft from 804 and 800 Naval Air Squadron on 14 May, led by Orr, attacked shipping near Vikten Island and, along with Lieutenant Blyth Ritchie, he shot down a Heinkel He 115 floatplane. At the same time he also shared in the destruction of two Blohm & Voss BV 138 flying boats and two more Heinkel floatplanes, for which he was mentioned in despatches.

== Later career ==
In September 1944, Orr was posted to RNAS Henstridge as the chief flying instructor. Later he was transferred to Boscombe Down where he joined the Empire Test Pilot School. While undertaking this role, he gained experience flying jet fighters and four engined bombers. He then served as a Royal Navy test pilot for two years and a half years. During this time he was heavily involved with experiments landing tricycle-undercarriage jet aircraft on aircraft carriers, for which he was awarded the Air Force Cross. In 1953, Orr was posted to HMS Ocean and on board her he saw operational service in the Korean War, attacking targets on the west coast of Korea. After this he returned to Boscombe Down as the commanding officer of the Naval Test Squadron, a role he undertook for three years. He was promoted to commander and his squadron was awarded the Boyd Trophy after being judged the most efficient squadron in the Fleet Air Arm. Orr's final appointment was in command the Inter service Hovercraft Trials Unit based at Lee-on-Solent. During his service Orr flew over 100 different aircraft and retired from the Royal Navy in 1966.

Upon leaving the service, Orr joined Vospers as their marine superintendent and became involved in their development of fast patrol boats. Five years later he left Vospers and became a commercial agent for a number of engineering firms. In 1999, Orr's wife, Myra, died. Orr died four years later on 11 August 2003. He was survived by two sons.

== Notes ==
Footnotes

Citations
