= Blackburn Roc =

British carrier-based fighter aircraft

B-25 Roc
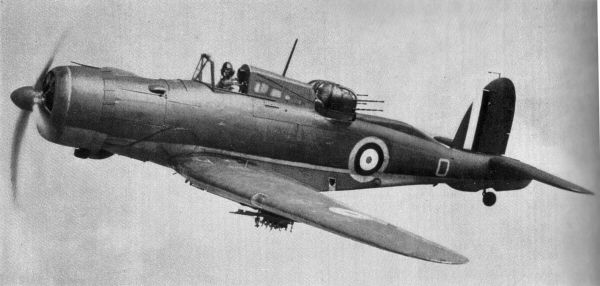

General information
- Type: Carrier-based fighter
- Manufacturer: Boulton Paul
- Designer: Blackburn Aircraft
- Primary user: Royal Navy
- Number built: 136

History
- Introduction date: April 1939
- First flight: 23 December 1938
- Retired: 1943
- Developed from: Blackburn Skua

The Blackburn Roc (company designation B-25) was a naval fighter aircraft designed and produced by the British aviation company Blackburn Aircraft. It took its name from the mythical bird of the tales of the Arabian Nights, the Roc. It was operated by the Fleet Air Arm (FAA) and was active during the Second World War.

The Roc was designed to Air Ministry Specification O.30/35 and was derived from the Blackburn Skua dive-bomber/fighter and developed in parallel to it. Unlike the Skua, the Roc had its armament in a turret. A large proportion of the work was subcontracted to another aircraft manufacturer, Boulton Paul, which had also designed their own turret fighter, the Boulton Paul Defiant. On 23 December 1938, the prototype Roc performed its maiden flight. Testing soon revealed it to have a relatively low maximum speed of only 223 mph (194 kn; 359 km/h). The float plane version of the Roc was even slower, leading to the cancellation of plans to equip float plane squadrons with the type. Cancellation of the project was discussed but this move was dismissed largely due to the wider impact on aircraft production.

During April 1939, the conventional version of the Roc was brought into FAA service. The type was present during the Allied campaign in Norway, as well as Operation Dynamo and Operation Aerial, the evacuations of Allied forces from Dunkirk and other French ports. The Roc quickly came to be viewed as inferior to existing aircraft, such as the Skua, and the type had only a limited career in front-line service. The Roc's sole confirmed aerial victory occurred on 28 May 1940, when a patrolling Roc of 806 Naval Air Squadron, flown by pilot Midshipman A. G. Day, shot down a Junkers Ju 88 bomber from below. Towards the end of 1940, the Roc was largely relegated to air sea rescue and target-towing duties. Only sporadic engagements occurred after this point, with no substantial accomplishments occurring. The Roc was withdrawn during 1943.

== Design and development ==
=== Background ===
On 31 December 1935, the Air Ministry issued Specification O.30/35, which sought a carrier-based turret-armed fighter for the Fleet Air Arm (FAA). The Blackburn Aircraft design team was headed by G. E. Petty. It was decided to pursue a derivative of its new Skua dive bomber, of which two prototypes had been ordered for the Fleet Air Arm earlier that year. There were several substantial differences, not least that the Skua did not use a turret; the fuselage was widened around the mid-section to accommodate it.

The rival aircraft manufacturer Boulton Paul proposed the P.85, a redesigned version of its land-based P.82 turret fighter (for Specification F.9/35, which would enter service as the "Defiant"), alternatively powered by a Bristol Hercules radial engine or a Rolls-Royce Merlin inline engine. Although the "Sea Defiant" was expected to be 85 mph (137 km/h) faster, the Air Ministry decided to select Blackburn's proposal instead.

Similar to the Skua, the B-25 Roc was a two-seat low-wing cantilever monoplane of all-metal construction. It was fitted with a retractable tailwheel undercarriage and its wings could be folded for storage aboard aircraft carriers. Attachment points for a float undercarriage were present as standard, unlike on the Skua. The Roc also retained the wing-mounted dive brakes present on the Skua but the mainplane was redesigned with a slight dihedral to obviate the upturned wingtips. It was powered by a Bristol Perseus radial engine that drove a three-bladed propeller. Amongst other things, the rear fuselage housed marine equipment, including a collapsible dinghy.

The Roc's primary armament was the same Boulton Paul Type A power-operated gun turret as used on the Defiant, with four .303 in (7.7 mm) Browning machine guns. The turret could rotate in any direction and the guns elevated as high as 85 degrees above the horizon; this movement was achieved via a control column. The turret was hydraulically powered by an electrically-driven pump, the guns were fired electrically and had integrated automatic interruption to prevent the tail unit or propeller being hit. Additional armaments included two 250 lb (110 kg) bombs and eight practice bombs, carried upon bomb racks under each wing; provisions for a close-fitting 70-gallon external fuel tank were also present on the underside of the central fuselage.

On 28 April 1937, the Air Ministry placed an "off the drawing board" order for 136 Rocs. As Blackburn already had full order books for the Skua and the Botha torpedo bomber, it was decided to sub-contract the detailed design and production of the aircraft to Boulton Paul at Wolverhampton; this arrangement has been attributed for the delayed delivery of the company's own turret aircraft, the Defiant. (Note: the Air Ministry had not expected to order the P.82/Defiant into production and Boulton Paul was able to take on the work. It was not until the Hawker Hotspur programme fell behind that the first orders for the Defiant were placed. During January 1938, the Hotspur was cancelled for Hawker to increase Hurricane production in favour of the Defiant.)

=== Into flight ===
On 23 December 1938, the prototype Roc performed its maiden flight in the hands of Blackburn test pilot H. J. Wilson. Contractor's trials were conducted at Brough after which, during March 1939, the aircraft was delivered to Aeroplane and Armament Experimental Establishment (A&AEE) at RAF Martlesham Heath for handling and armaments trials. Early modifications, such as alternative de Havilland-supplied propellers, were also evaluated. Early flight testing revealed its handling to be not only acceptable but superior to that of the Skua; while not suitable for aerobatic manoeuvres, it demonstrated its steadiness in steep dives. The aircraft also demonstrated poor performance in some areas, particularly that its maximum speed was only 223 mph (194 kn; 359 km/h).

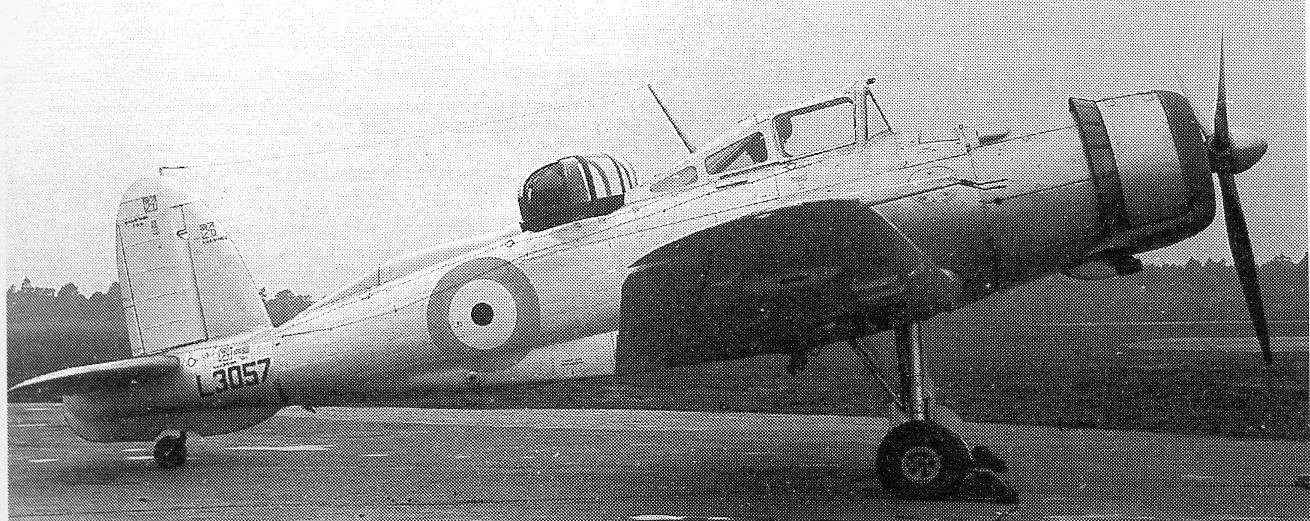
The prototype Roc, May 1939

By this point, some officials had already recognised that the Roc's performance would be inadequate; during October 1938, the Fifth Sea Lord (the Chief of Naval Air Services) Alexander Ramsay issued his recommendation that the development of the Roc be abandoned. Production was allowed to continue as the project's cancellation would have caused too much disruption for Boulton Paul; plans were laid to adapt the aircraft to perform target towing and other secondary duties.

As well as its primary role as a carrier-based fighter, the Roc was also required to be capable of operating as a floatplane. A conversion kit was designed that allowed for a set of floats from a Blackburn Shark to be fitted. These floats, which was largely composed of Alclad, were fitted with pneumatically-actuated water rudders that connected directly with the aircraft's conventional braking system; the tail wheel was also replaced by a mooring ring.

During testing, the first conversion demonstrated direction instability and during December 1939, it crashed at Helensburgh Marine Aircraft Experimental Establishment where it had been transferred at the outbreak of the war. Testing continued using the other conversion, with particular effort paid to addressing its instability. While the addition of an enlarged ventral fin largely resolved the problem, the effect of the floats on the aircraft's performance was too great to be ignored, as the maximum speed had fallen to only 193 mph (168 kn; 311 km/h), thus plans to form a fighter squadron equipped with Roc floatplanes were abandoned. During 1942, the Roc floatplane was again evaluated to determine whether the aircraft could be useful as a target tug for the fleet, replacing Blackburn Shark floatplane target tugs. The Roc floatplane was rejected in this role as well, resulting in the fleet's requirements for target tugs being fulfilled by landplanes, such as the Miles Martinet, instead. By August 1940, production of the Roc had ceased and manufacturing resources were diverted to more capable aircraft such as the Fairey Fulmar and the Hawker Sea Hurricane.

== Operational history ==
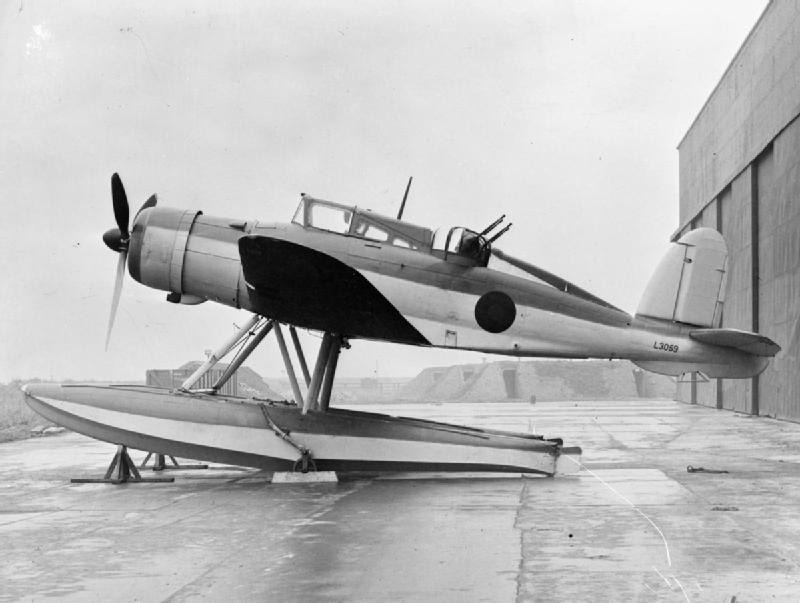
The Roc Seaplane prototype, L3059

During April 1939, preparations commenced for the Roc's entry into squadron service; that same month, the fifth production aircraft was delivered to the Central Flying School to assist with personnel familiarisation. Later that year, deliveries of the Roc commenced to the Skua-equipped 800 and 803 Naval Air Squadrons, with three or four Rocs supplementing the Skuas. When 803 Squadron relocated to RAF Wick in northern Scotland to provide fighter cover for the Royal Naval base at Scapa Flow in the Orkney Islands, the Rocs proved ineffective; they were described by the squadron's commanding officer as a "constant hindrance", who requested that the type be replaced by additional Skuas.

During the Allied campaign in Norway, a small contingent of Rocs travelled with 800 and 801 Naval Air Squadrons in HMS Ark Royal (By this point, 803 Squadron had abandoned its Rocs to become an all-Skua squadron). In the Norwegian theatre, they were used to carry out combat air patrols over the fleet, but were regarded as being of little use, showing inadequate performance when intercepting German aircraft.

Both Skuas and Rocs operated over the English Channel in the summer of 1940 in Operation Dynamo and Operation Aerial, the evacuations of Allied forces from Dunkirk and other French ports. What is believed to be the Roc's sole confirmed aerial victory occurred on 28 May 1940, when a patrolling Roc of 806 Naval Air Squadron, flown by pilot Midshipman A. G. Day, alongside two Skuas, intercepted five Junkers Ju 88s which were attacking a convoy off Ostend in Belgium. Flying underneath the Junkers while the Skuas attacked from above, Day's Roc destroyed one Ju 88 before returning safely to RAF Detling. On 12 June, Rocs and Skuas of 801 Naval Air Squadron strafed and dive-bombed German E-boats in Boulogne harbour, damaging several E-boats. On 20 June, Skuas and Rocs were used to bomb gun emplacements at Cap Gris Nez.

The Roc was relegated to air sea rescue and target-towing duties at various locations. The majority of aircraft were dispatched from the production line to second-line squadrons. No. 2 Anti-Aircraft Co-operation Unit at Gosport received 16 Rocs to replace its Blackburn Sharks during June 1940. The type was commonly deployed for air-sea rescue patrols, searching for the survivors of sunken ships and downed aircraft in the Channel.

On 26 September 1940, during one such patrol, Pilot Officer D. H. Clarke and his gunner, Sergeant Hunt, engaged a Heinkel He 59 seaplane, also on a rescue mission, which had fired on them first. The two aircraft exchanged fire until they reached the coast of France, where the Heinkel escaped in a damaged condition. Some Rocs were dispatched to distant locations such as Bermuda. However, the last pair of operational aircraft were withdrawn from service during June 1943. The last four Rocs stationed at HMS Daedalus in Gosport survived until late 1944, all unairworthy, with their turrets still being used for anti-aircraft defence.

== Operators ==
United Kingdom

Royal Air Force

- No. 2 Anti-Aircraft Co-operation Unit, RAF
- No. 24 Squadron RAF
- 241 Squadron RAF

Royal Navy Fleet Air Arm

- 725 Naval Air Squadron
- 758 Naval Air Squadron
- 759 Naval Air Squadron
- 760 Naval Air Squadron
- 765 Naval Air Squadron
- 769 Naval Air Squadron
- 770 Naval Air Squadron
- 771 Naval Air Squadron
- 772 Naval Air Squadron
- 773 Naval Air Squadron
- 774 Naval Air Squadron
- 775 Naval Air Squadron
- 776 Naval Air Squadron
- 777 Naval Air Squadron
- 778 Naval Air Squadron
- 782 Naval Air Squadron
- 787 Naval Air Squadron
- 789 Naval Air Squadron
- 791 Naval Air Squadron
- 792 Naval Air Squadron
- 793 Naval Air Squadron
- 794 Naval Air Squadron
- 800 Naval Air Squadron
- 801 Naval Air Squadron
- 803 Naval Air Squadron
- 805 Naval Air Squadron
- 806 Naval Air Squadron

== Specifications ==
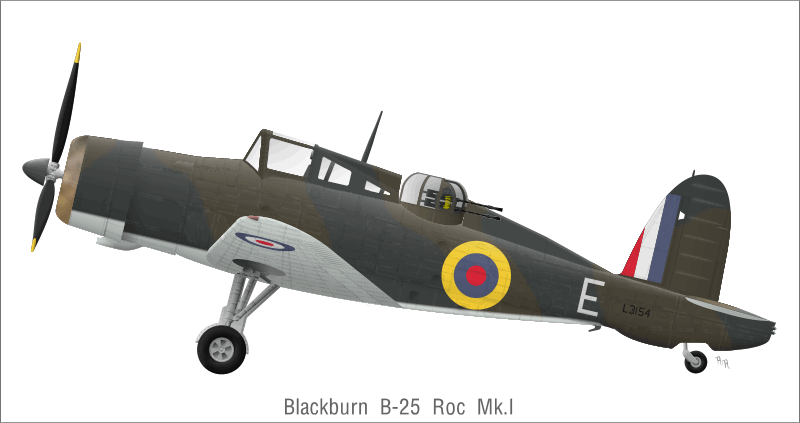
Roc Mk.I L3154, 805 sqn., RNAS Donibristle, 1940

Data from British Naval Aircraft since 1912

General characteristics

- Crew: 2
- Length: 35 ft 7 in (10.85 m)
- Wingspan: 46 ft 0 in (14.02 m)
- Height: 12 ft 1 in (3.68 m)
- Wing area: 310 sq ft (29 m^{2})
- Empty weight: 6,121 lb (2,776 kg)
- Gross weight: 7,950 lb (3,606 kg)
- Powerplant: 1 × Bristol Perseus XII nine-cylinder air-cooled sleeve-valve radial piston engine, 890 hp (660 kW)
- Propellers: 3-bladed variable-pitch propeller

Performance

- Maximum speed: 194 kn (223 mph, 359 km/h) at 10,000 ft (3,000 m)
- Cruise speed: 117 kn (135 mph, 217 km/h)
- Range: 700 nmi (810 mi, 1,300 km) with 70 imp gal (320 L; 84 US gal) long-range tank
- Service ceiling: 18,000 ft (5,500 m)
- Rate of climb: 1,500 ft/min (7.6 m/s)

Armament

- Guns: 4 × 0.303 in (7.7 mm) Browning machine guns in power operated dorsal turret
- Bombs: 8 × 30 lb (14 kg) bombs

== See also ==
Related development

- Blackburn Skua

Aircraft of comparable role, configuration, and era

- Boulton Paul Defiant
- Hawker Hotspur

Related lists

- List of aircraft of the Fleet Air Arm
- List of aircraft of the Royal Air Force
- List of aircraft of World War II
- List of fighter aircraft
