= HMS Shearwater =

Five ships of the Royal Navy have borne the name HMS Shearwater after the shearwater, a seabird:

- HMS Shearwater (1808) was a 10-gun Cherokee-class brig-sloop launched in 1808 and sold in 1832.
- HMS Shearwater (1837) was a wooden paddle packet launched in 1826 as the GPO vessel Dolphin. She was transferred to the Royal Navy and renamed in 1837, and was sold in 1857.
- HMS Shearwater (1861) was a Rosario-class wooden screw sloop launched in 1861 and broken up by 1877.
- HMS Shearwater (1900) was a Condor-class sloop launched in 1900. She was transferred to the Royal Canadian Navy as a depot ship in 1915 and was sold in 1922.
- HMS Shearwater (L39) was a Kingfisher-class sloop launched in 1939 and sold in 1947.
