= Fairey Fulmar =

British carrier-borne reconnaissance aircraft/fighter aircraft

Fulmar
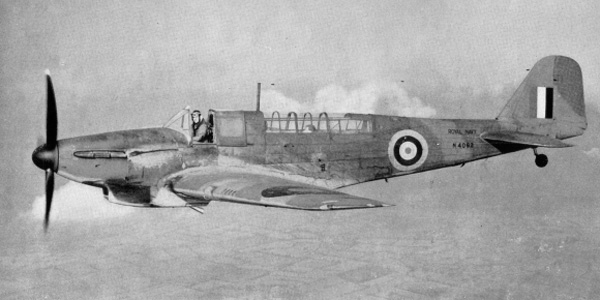
- Fairey Fulmar Mk II N4062

General information
- Type: Carrier-based reconnaissance/fighter aircraft
- National origin: United Kingdom
- Manufacturer: Fairey Aviation Company
- Designer: Marcel Lobelle
- Status: Retired
- Primary users: Royal Navy Royal Air Force
- Number built: 600

History
- Manufactured: 1940–1943
- Introduction date: 10 May 1940
- First flight: 4 January 1940
- Retired: 1945
- Developed from: Fairey P.4/34

The Fairey Fulmar is a British carrier-borne reconnaissance aircraft/fighter aircraft which was developed and manufactured by aircraft company Fairey Aviation. It was named after the northern fulmar, a seabird native to the British Isles. The Fulmar served with the Royal Navy's Fleet Air Arm (FAA) during the Second World War.

The design of the Fulmar was based on that of the earlier Fairey P.4/34, a land-based light bomber developed during 1936 as a replacement for the Fairey Battle light bomber. Fairey had redesigned the aircraft as a navalised observation/fighter aircraft to satisfy the requirements of Specification O.8/38, for which it was selected. Although its performance (like that of its Battle antecedent) was unspectacular, the Fulmar was a reliable, sturdy aircraft with long range and an effective armament of eight machine guns; the type could also be put into production relatively quickly. On 4 January 1940, the first production aircraft made its first flight and delivery commenced shortly thereafter, while production of an improved model, the Fulmar Mk II, started during January 1941. Fairey produced a total of 600 Fulmars at its Stockport factory between January 1940 and December 1942.

During July 1940, No. 806 Squadron became the first FAA squadron to receive the Fulmar. It participated in the pursuit of the German battleship Bismarck, having acted as a spotter for the chasing fleet. The Fulmar was heavily used in the North African Campaign, flying convoy protection patrols to and from the island of Malta, and providing air cover for Fairey Swordfish torpedo bombers during attacks such as the Battle of Cape Matapan. By autumn 1940, it had been recorded as having shot down ten Italian bombers and six enemy fighters. The Fulmar was also deployed to the Far East, where it proved largely incapable of matching the Japanese-built Mitsubishi A6M Zero. During the later stages of the conflict, it was relegated from the fighter role by single-seat aircraft such as the British-built Supermarine Seafire and the American-built Grumman Martlet fighters. While continuing service as a trainer and reconnaissance aircraft for a time, the Fulmar was withdrawn from front line service in February 1945.

== Design and development ==
=== Background ===
The Fulmar has its origins in the Fairey P.4/34, which had been developed in response to the issuing of Specification P.4/34 by the British Air Ministry. P.4/34 had sought a light bomber that would be capable of being used as a dive bomber; in addition to Fairey's entry, competing submissions came in the form of the Hawker Henley and an unbuilt Gloster design. Despite the P.4/34's relatively high maximum speed of 284 mph, the rival Henley, which was capable of attaining 300 mph, was selected and eventually ordered; in service, the Henley was largely used as a target tug.

The Fulmar was basically a version of the P.4/34 which had been adapted for naval use. Fairey submitted their modified design as a response to Specification O.8/38, which called for a two-crew fighter capable of observation and fleet defence operations. As the prospective aircraft was not expected to encounter any major fighter opposition, as Nazi Germany, Britain's only foreseen enemy during this era, possessed no aircraft carriers of its own, factors such as long range and heavy armament were considered to be more important than a high level of either manoeuvrability or speed. As the type was intended to routinely perform lengthy flights over the ocean, the presence of a navigator / Wireless operator was considered to be an essential element, especially when flying at nighttime or during poor weather conditions.

Possessing a substantial resemblance to the earlier Fairey Battle, the Fulmar prototype was an aerodynamically cleaner aircraft and featured a folding wing that was 16 in (41 cm) shorter than the Fairey P.4/34. On 13 January 1937, the prototype P.4/34 serial number K5099 conducted its maiden flight at Fairey Aviation's Great West Aerodrome (this site has since been occupied by London Heathrow Airport), the Fairey test pilot Chris Staniland was at the controls. Shortly after the initial flight tests, the tail was elevated by 8 in (20 cm). During 1938, the name Fulmar was picked for the type, although this was not announced until deliveries of the type commenced during 1940.

=== Production and further development ===
The first prototype Fulmar, which acted as a "flying mock-up", was powered by a single Rolls-Royce Merlin III engine, which was capable of generating up to 1,030hp hp (810 kW). Flight testing revealed the prototype's performance to be relatively poor, the highest speed it could attain being 230 mph (370 km/h). Following the adoption of the more powerful Merlin VIII engine – a variant unique to the Fulmar and with supercharging optimised for low-level flight, as well as various aerodynamic improvements made to the airframe, the prototype's speed was increased to 265 mph (426 km/h) when flown at an altitude of 7500 ft (2286m). Due to the desperate requirement for more modern fighters to equip Britain's carrier fleet, the Fulmar's performance was considered adequate.

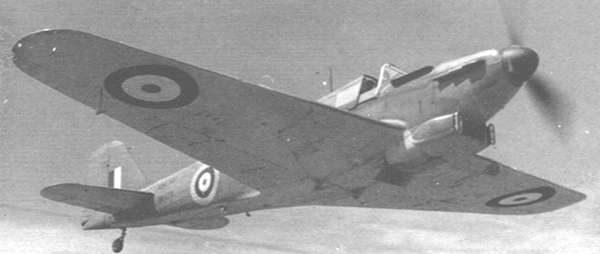
Fulmar Mk II, identified by the small additional air inlets on either side of the chin

As a relatively straightforward derivative of an existing prototype, the Fulmar promised to be available in quantity quickly; during mid-1938, an initial order for 127 production aircraft was placed by the Royal Navy. Beyond Britain's own plans for the type, the Danish Navy also took a keen interest in the Fulmar; at one point, plans were in motion to produce the aircraft under licence in Denmark; however, such ambitions were terminated by the outbreak of the Second World War. Furthermore, while a float plane model of the aircraft was designed and promoted, no such aircraft would ever be constructed. On 4 January 1940, the first production aircraft flew from Fairey's facility at RAF Ringway near Manchester; the final of 600 Fulmars was delivered from Ringway on 11 December 1942.

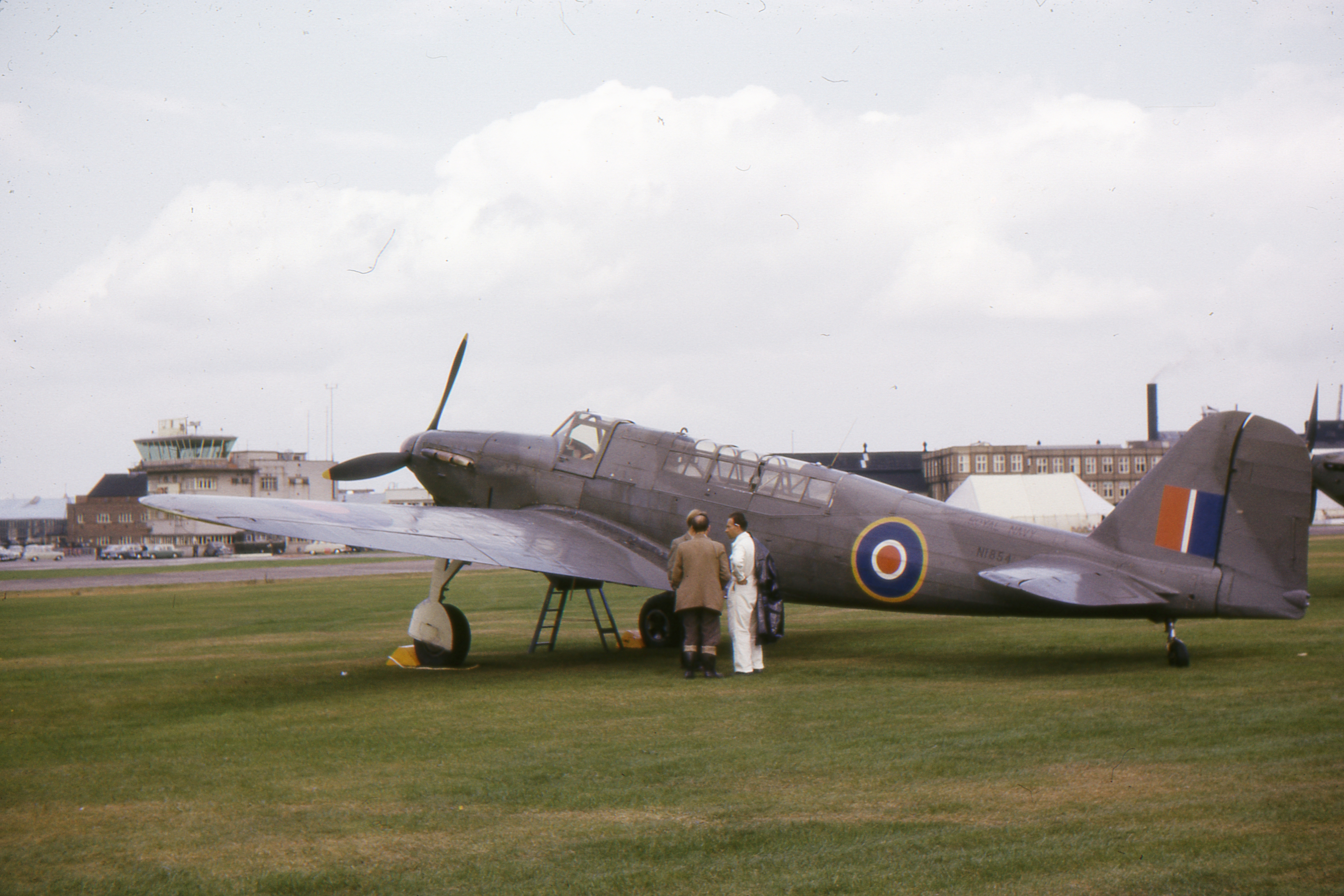
N1854, the first production Fulmar at Farnborough at the SBAC show on 8 September 1962

During January 1941, production of the improved Fulmar Mk II commenced; the first Mk II aircraft was delivered to an operational squadron in March 1941. This model of the aircraft was furnished with the more powerful Merlin XXX engine; this engine and 350lb of airframe weight savings allowed the aircraft to achieve 272mph at rated altitude, whilst also allowing sea level rate of climb to increase to 1250 feet per minute (15,000ft being obtainable in 12 minutes against 15 minutes in the Mk1) the airframe had provision for a 60-gallon (273 litre) centre-line drop tank and provision to carry a 250 lb (114 kg) or 500 lb (227 kg) bomb in lieu of the drop tank. During October 1941, tests performed at RAF Boscombe Down revealed that the 60-gallon drop tank extended the aircraft's range to 1,100 mi (1,800 km). During June 1942, flight testing of the Fulmar II was conducted at Boscombe Down; these tests found that the Fulmar could safely drop a 500 lb bomb during 60-degree dives at up to 310 knots. Fulmars were launched from catapults on merchant ships, a convoy defensive plan that was being evaluated at the time.

N1854, the first production Fulmar, was later modified to Mk II standard and re-designated G-AIBE, after which it was used as Fairey's hack for some time. During June 1959, it reverted to service markings and was seen at Farnborough at the SBAC show on 8 September 1962; G-AIBE's last flight was conducted three months later on 18 December 1962. During 1972, the aircraft was presented to the Fleet Air Arm Museum, Yeovilton, where it has been preserved and is on static display.

== Operational history ==
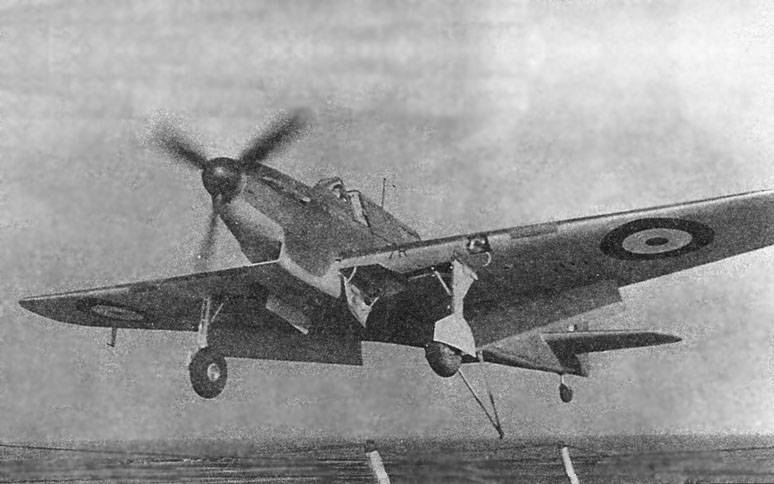
Fulmar Mk I landing on an aircraft carrier in the Mediterranean, 1941

During July 1940, the first squadron of the Fleet Air Arm to be equipped with the Fulmar was No. 806 Squadron, this squadron commenced operations from the aircraft carrier HMS Illustrious shortly afterwards. The Navy had specified a two-seat machine so that the pilot would have the assistance of another crew member in reporting back to the fleet the observations made, which were done using wireless telegraphy (W/T) and to navigate over the ocean. The Fulmar was too large and lacked manoeuvrability against single-seat, land-based opposition, as it did in the Mediterranean Theatre; its performance was clearly inferior to typical land-based fighters. The long range of the Fulmar was often useful at times. During the 1941 chase of German battleship Bismarck, Germany's newest capital ship, six Fulmars from the aircraft carrier HMS Victorious were used as carrier-borne spotters, playing a marginal role in tracking the movements of the battleship.

The Fulmar was one of several British aircraft to participate in the North African Campaign. During September 1940, the Fulmar first saw action while flying convoy protection patrols to and from the island of Malta. When reinforcements were being dispatched to Malta, Fulmars guided flights of carrier-launched Hurricane and Spitfire fighters. The relatively sturdy Fulmar was able to achieve dozens of victories against its Italian and German adversaries. The first recorded kill by a Fulmar was scored on 2 September 1940. By October of that year, Fulmar pilots had claimed the shooting down of ten Italian bombers. The type proved particularly effective against Italian reconnaissance aircraft. Later on, thirteen Fulmars onboard the aircraft carrier HMS Formidable also participated in the Battle of Cape Matapan, strafing the battleship Vittorio Veneto whilst trying to draw fire away from the attacking Fairey Swordfish and Fairey Albacore torpedo bombers.

The Fulmar was also deployed in other theatres, including the Eastern Front. The type was a common constituent of the numerous Arctic convoys of World War II. Fulmars also played a prominent role in Operation EF, the ill-fated air raid on Axis-held facilities Kirkenes and Petsamo conducted during July 1941. During early 1942, multiple Fulmar-equipped squadrons were deployed to the Pacific Theatre against the Japanese Empire, while two squadrons were dispatched to defend Ceylon. On engaging with the nimble and lightly armoured Mitsubishi A6M fighter, the Fulmar quickly proved to have been outclassed against the Zero and six Fulmars were lost in exchange for four Aichi D3A "Vals" and one Nakajima B5N "Kate". Despite this, more Fulmars were dispatched to the Far East.

Throughout 1942, the Fulmar was being gradually replaced as a naval fighter by single-seat aircraft that had been adapted from land fighters, such as the British Hawker Sea Hurricane and Supermarine Seafire, or the American Grumman Martlet, which was designed as a carrier aircraft from the start. The Fulmar was to figure prominently in the Mediterranean during 1941 and 1942 as the primary fighter of the Fleet Air Arm for most of the Malta convoys during those years. Sixteen Fulmars were present on Victorious during the penultimate Operation Pedestal which was to be their last major carrier borne operation. The type continued to be operated, providing useful service as a night convoy escort and intruder, it was also used to train crews for the newer and more advanced Fairey Barracuda. Following their withdrawal from the fighter role, Fulmars were used for long-range reconnaissance missions. Unarmed Fulmars would also see service in Africa as communications and despatch aircraft.

At its peak, twenty squadrons of the Fleet Air Arm were equipped with the Fulmar. It flew from eight fleet aircraft carriers and five escort carriers. No. 273 Squadron RAF operated them for some months in 1942 from China Bay, Ceylon, seeing action against Japanese forces during the Indian Ocean raid on 9 April 1942, though about half the squadron personnel were Navy. Fulmars are recorded as having destroyed 112 enemy aircraft against the loss of 40 Fulmars, which made the type the leading fighter type in terms of aircraft shot down to be operated by the Fleet Air Arm during the war. In February 1945, the Fulmar was withdrawn from front line service; the last operational aircraft, a Fulmar MK II night-fighter from No. 813 Squadron, was severely damaged in a landing accident at the safety barrier on HMS Campania and was written off.

Approximately 100 Fulmars were converted to a night fighter variant but the type achieved only limited success in this role. Some of the early marks of the aircraft were also operated from CAM ships. Vichy French forces reportedly captured a Fulmar Mk I, which had been forced to land while flying a reconnaissance mission over Senegal during March 1941. This Fulmar was repaired and operated for some time by the Group de Chasse I/4.

According to pilots, its flight characteristics were considered to be pleasant, while its widely spaced undercarriage provided good deck handling and it had excellent fuel capacity and range. Most Fleet Air Arm fighter aces scored at least some of their victories while flying Fulmars; the first pilot to score five kills while flying the type was Sub-Lieutenant Jackie Sewell. Sub-Lieutenant Stanley Orr finished the war with twelve confirmed air victories, the third-highest scoring pilot in the FAA.

== Variants ==
Mk.I
First production variant powered by a 1,035 hp (772 kW) (1,275 hp at take off) Rolls-Royce Merlin VIII; 8 × .303 Browning Mk.II (750 rounds per gun), 250 built.
Mk.II
Updated variant powered by a 1,300 hp (970 kW) Merlin XXX with a new propeller and the addition of tropical equipment; 8 × .303 Browning Mk.II (1,000 rounds per gun) or 4 × 0.5 in (13 mm) Browning AN/M2 – part of the last batch (170 rounds per gun, in other sources specified 370 rounds per gun), some finished as night fighters, one prototype converted from a Mk.I and 350 built.
NF Mk.II
Mk.II night fighter with an Air Interception AI Mk. IV radar (1 aircraft) or AI Mk.X radar (other); 4 × 0.50 Browning AN/M2 – about 50 aircraft (other 8 × .303 Browning Mk.II), total were converted from the Mk.II nearly 100 aircraft.

== Operators ==
United Kingdom

- Royal Air Force
  - No. 273 Squadron RAF
- Fleet Air Arm
  - 731 Naval Air Squadron (Deck Landing Control Officer training)
  - 740 Naval Air Squadron (Observer Training Squadron)
  - 746 Naval Air Squadron (Night Fighter Interception Unit)
  - 748 Naval Air Squadron (Naval Fighter Pool)
  - 759 Naval Air Squadron (RNAS Fighter School)
  - 760 Naval Air Squadron
  - 761 Naval Air Squadron (RNAS Fighter School)
  - 762 Naval Air Squadron (RNAS Fighter School)
  - 766 Naval Air Squadron
  - 767 Naval Air Squadron
  - 768 Naval Air Squadron
  - 769 Naval Air Squadron
  - 772 Naval Air Squadron (Fleet Requirements Unit)
  - 775 Naval Air Squadron (Fleet Requirements Unit)
  - 777 Naval Air Squadron (Fleet Requirements Unit)
  - 778 Naval Air Squadron
  - 784 Naval Air Squadron (Night Fighter Training Unit)
  - 787 Naval Air Squadron (Fighter Development Unit)
  - 790 Naval Air Squadron
  - 795 Naval Air Squadron (East African Fighter Pool)
  - 800 Naval Air Squadron
  - 803 Naval Air Squadron
  - 804 Naval Air Squadron
  - 805 Naval Air Squadron
  - 806 Naval Air Squadron
  - 807 Naval Air Squadron
  - 808 Naval Air Squadron
  - 809 Naval Air Squadron
  - 813 Naval Air Squadron (Night Sqn.)
  - 879 Naval Air Squadron
  - 884 Naval Air Squadron
  - 886 Naval Air Squadron
  - 887 Naval Air Squadron
  - 889 Naval Air Squadron
  - 893 Naval Air Squadron

== Surviving aircraft ==
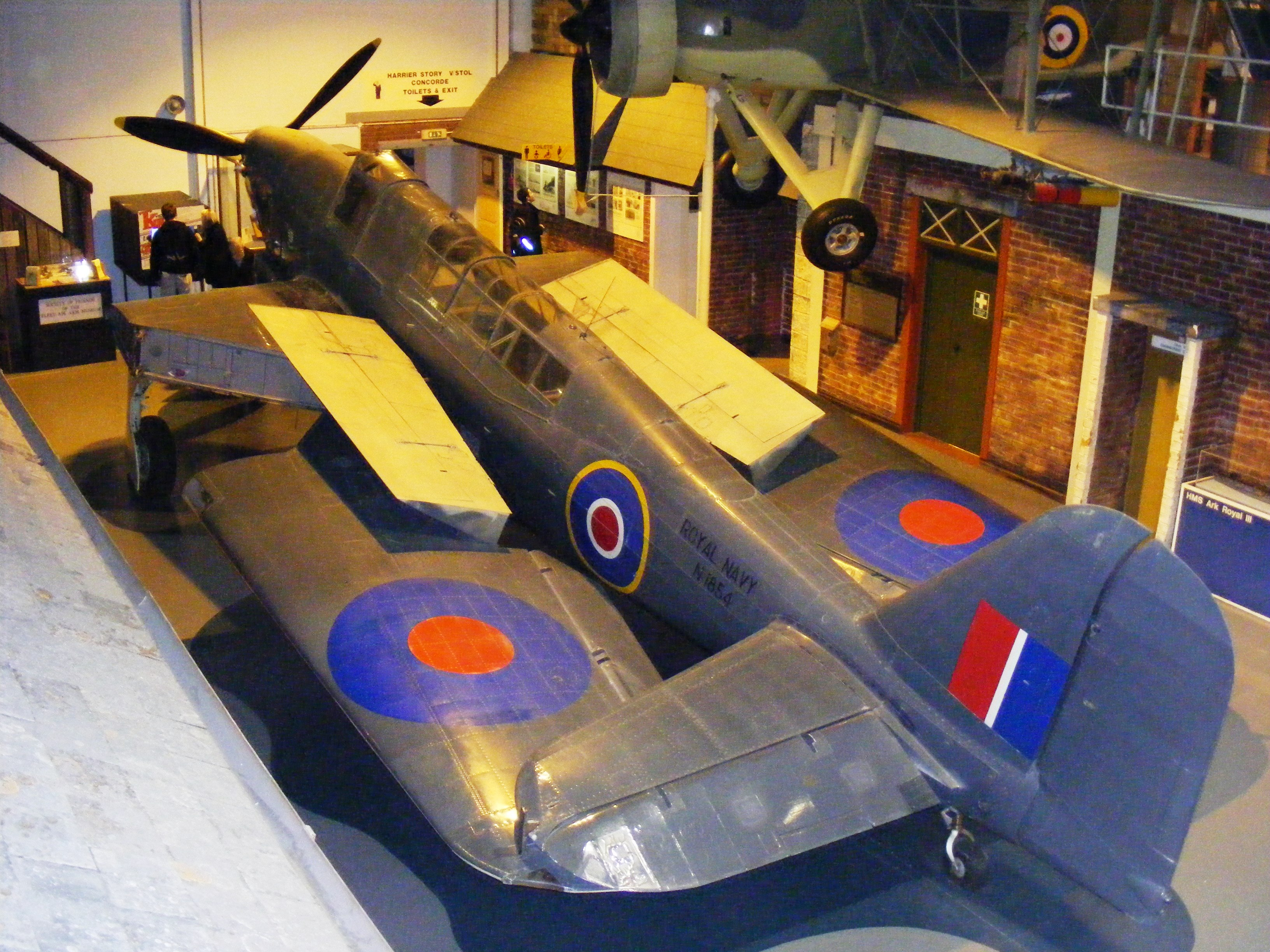
Fairey Fulmar at the Fleet Air Arm Museum

The only known survivor is N1854, the Fulmar prototype (and first production Mk I) at the Fleet Air Arm Museum, Yeovilton. The only known surviving Rolls-Royce Merlin VIII engine is in a private collection in the UK and came from Fulmar Mk I, N1926.

== Specifications (Fulmar Mk II) ==
Data from Fairey Fulmar, Warpaint Series No.41, The Encyclopedia of Weapons of World War II,

General characteristics

- Crew: 2
- Length: 40 ft 2 in (12.24 m)
- Wingspan: 46 ft 4.25 in (14.1288 m)
- Height: 14 ft 0 in (4.27 m)
- Wing area: 342 sq ft (31.8 m^{2})
- Airfoil: root: NACA 2418; tip: NACA 2409
- Empty weight: 7,015 lb (3,182 kg)
- Gross weight: 9,672 lb (4,387 kg)
- Max takeoff weight: 10,200 lb (4,627 kg)
- Powerplant: 1 × Rolls-Royce Merlin 30 V-12 liquid-cooled piston engine, 1,300 hp (970 kW)
- Propellers: 3-bladed Rotol constant-speed propeller

Performance

- Maximum speed: 272 mph (438 km/h, 236 kn) at 7,250 ft (2,210 m)
- Cruise speed: 235 mph (378 km/h, 204 kn)
- Range: 780 mi (1,260 km, 680 nmi)
- Service ceiling: 27,200 ft (8,300 m)
- Rate of climb: 1,200 ft/min (6.1 m/s)
- Wing loading: 28 lb/sq ft (140 kg/m^{2})

Armament

- 8 × 0.303 in (7.7 mm) or 4 × 0.50 in (12.7 mm) Browning machine guns wing-mounted, and occasionally 1 × .303 in (7.7 mm) Vickers K machine gun in rear cabin
- 2 × 100 lb (45 kg) or 250 lb (110 kg) bombs

== See also ==
Related development

- Fairey Battle
- Fairey Firefly
- Fairey P.4/34

Aircraft of comparable role, configuration, and era

- Blackburn Skua
- Grumman F4F Wildcat
- Grumman F6F Hellcat
- Hawker Sea Hurricane
- Mitsubishi A6M Zero
- Supermarine Seafire

Related lists

- List of aircraft of the Fleet Air Arm
- List of aircraft of the Royal Air Force
- List of aircraft of World War II
