= Air Headquarters East Africa =

Air Headquarters East Africa AHQ East Africa
- Active: 1940-1951; 1961-1964
- Country: United Kingdom
- Branch: Royal Air Force

Air Headquarters East Africa (or AHQ East Africa) was a command of the British Royal Air Force (RAF) formed on 19 October 1940 by expanding AHQ RAF Nairobi. On 15 December 1941, the command was reduced to Group status as No. 207 (General Purpose) Group. On 16 November 1942, Air H.Q. East Africa was reformed by raising No. 207 Group back to Command status again.

== East African Campaign ==
The onset of the East African Campaign in 1940 led to a significant buildup in what became Air HQ East Africa. The Italians held Ethiopia and Eritrea and quickly seized British Somaliland. Lieutenant General William Platt, Commandant of the Sudan Defence Force, commanded the forces invading Italian East Africa from Sudan during the campaign.

In Sudan, the Royal Air Force's (RAF's) Air Headquarters Sudan (Headquarters 203 Group from 17 August, Air Headquarters East Africa from 19 October) under the ultimate command of the Air Officer Commanding-in-Chief (AOC-in-C) Middle East, had 14 Squadron, 47 Squadron and 223 Squadron (Vickers Wellesley bombers). A flight of Vickers Vincent biplanes from 47 Squadron performed Army Co-operation duties and were later reinforced from Egypt by 45 squadron (Bristol Blenheims). Six Gladiator biplane fighters were based in Port Sudan, for trade protection and anti-submarine patrols over the Red Sea and the air defence of Port Sudan, Atbara and Khartoum and army support. In May, 1 (Fighter) Squadron South African Air Force (SAAF) arrived, was transferred to Egypt to convert to Gladiators and returned to Khartoum in August. The SAAF in Kenya had 12 Squadron SAAF (Junkers Ju 86 bombers), 11 Squadron SAAF (Fairey Battle bombers), 40 Squadron SAAF (Hawker Hartebees), 2 Squadron SAAF (Hawker Fury fighters) and 237 (Rhodesia) Squadron (Hawker Hardy). Better aircraft became available later but the first aircraft were older and slower, the South Africans even pressing an old Vickers Valencia biplane into service as a bomber.

On 1 November 1940, a communications unit, Air HQ East Africa Communications Squadron, was established at RAF Nairobi; it was disbanded at RAF Eastleigh on 15 December 1941.

The South Africans faced experienced Italian pilots, including a cadre of Spanish Civil War veterans. Despite its lack of experience, 1 SAAF claimed 48 enemy aircraft destroyed and 57 damaged in the skies over East Africa. A further 57 were claimed destroyed on the ground; all for the loss of six pilots—it is thought the unit was guilty of severe over-claiming. From November 1940 to early January 1941, Platt continued to apply constant pressure on the Italians along the Sudan–Ethiopia border with patrols and raids by ground troops and aircraft. Hawker Hurricanes and more Gloster Gladiators began to replace some of the older models. On 6 December, a large concentration of Italian motor transport was bombed and strafed by Commonwealth aircraft a few miles north of Kassala. The same aircraft then proceeded to machine-gun from low level the nearby positions of the Italian Blackshirts and colonial infantry. A few days later, the same aircraft bombed the Italian base at Keru, fifty miles east of Kassala. The Commonwealth pilots had the satisfaction of seeing supply dumps, stores, and transport enveloped in flame and smoke as they flew away. One morning in mid-December, a force of Italian fighters strafed a Rhodesian landing-strip at Wajir near Kassala, where two Hawker Hardys were caught on the ground and destroyed and 5,000 US gal (19,000 L) of fuel were set alight, four Africans were killed and eleven injured fighting the fire.

== Period as 207 Group ==
On 15 December 1941, Air HQ East Africa was reduced to Group status as No. 207 (General Purpose) Group. Eleven months later, on 16 November 1942, Air H.Q. East Africa was reformed by raising No. 207 Group back to Command status again.

A derivative of the Hawker Audax biplane, the Hawker Hartebeest, a light bomber, was built for the South African Air Force with modifications made from the Audax. Sixty-nine of these aircraft were built, the majority in South Africa. The aircraft saw action in East Africa during clashes against Italy who occupied Abyssinia.

On 27 October 1942, 207 Group's units included:

Units	Aircraft
16 Squadron SAAF	Beaufort, Maryland
34 Flight SAAF	Anson
35 Flight SAAF	Blenheim
No. 246 Wing RAF 41 Squadron SAAF	Hartebeeste, Hurricane
No. 209 Squadron (RAF)	Catalina
No. 321 Squadron (RAF)	Catalina
No. 1414 Flight (RAF)	Gladiator
No. 1433 Flight (RAF)	Lysander

== Orders of battle ==
Commanders & Squadron Assignments (1941–1945)
11 November 1941 Air H.Q. East Africa A/Cdre William Sowrey	27 October 1942 No. 207 Group A/Cdre Malcolm Taylor	10 July 1943 Air H.Q. East Africa AVM Harold Kerby	June 1944 Air H.Q. East Africa AVM Harold Kerby	January 1945 Air H.Q. East Africa AVM Brian Baker
3 Squadron SAAF; Mohawk	No. 246 Wing (Mombasa) No. 209 Squadron; Catalina - -	No. 246 Wing No. 209 Squadron; Catalina; No. 265 Squadron; Catalina	No. 246 Wing; General Reconnaissance	No. 246 Wing; General Reconnaissance
15 Squadron SAAF; Battle	1433 Flight SAAF; Lysander 1414 Flight SAAF; Gladiator	No. 258 Wing No. 1414 Flight; Lysander, Anson	No. 258 Wing; General Reconnaissance	No. 258 Wing; General Reconnaissance
16 Squadron SAAF; Junkers 86, Maryland	16 Squadron SAAF; Beaufort, Maryland	No. 259 Squadron; Catalina		
41 Squadron SAAF; Hartebeeste	41 Squadron SAAF; Hartebeeste, Hurricane	No. 262 Squadron; Catalina		
51 Flight SAAF; Anson	No. 321 Squadron; Catalina	No. 321 Squadron Det. Catalina		
34 Flight SAAF; Junkers 86	34 Flight SAAF; Anson			
35 Flight SAAF; Junkers 52	35 Flight SAAF; Blenheim			

Notes: A/Cdre=Air Commodore; AVM=Air Vice Marshal; Det.=Detachment

In January 1943, Air H.Q. East Africa became a sub-command of the RAF Middle East Command, itself a sub-command of the Mediterranean Air Command.

== Post war ==
Postwar commanders included:

- 29 Sep 1945 - Air Commodore S H C Gray
- 17 Dec 1946 - A/Cdre N A P Pritchett
- 17 Nov 1947 - A/Cdre A G Bishop
- 1948 - Air Vice Marshal A C Stevens
- 1949 - Air Commodore E D H Davies
- 19 Apr 1950 - Air Commodore L T Pankhurst

AHQ East Africa included in November 1945 a large number of small support units, Nos 1586 and 1414 Meteorological Flights; 249 Squadron at Eastleigh; RAF Station Mombasa with 15 Embarkation Unit, No. 3 Section Air Ministry Directorate-General of Works (AMDGW); an RAF Unit at Mogadishu (to which a squadron of 324 Wing from Sudan, 213 Squadron, was dispatched as the Ogaden was being returned to Ethiopia in mid-1948, Lee FFME 40); 105 Maintenance Unit at Thika with a detachment, at Gilgil; and smaller units at Dar es Salaam, Diego Suarez, Kisumu, Mauritius, Nairobi, Pamanzi, Port Reitz (No. 1345 Anti-Malarial Flight); Seychelles, Tabora, and Tulear (an RAF Unit and a Marine Craft Section).

Air H.Q. East Africa was disbanded on 15 September 1951, reformed on 1 February 1961, and disbanded on 11 December 1964. In the 1950s and 1960s the RAF in East Africa was reduced to a single station, RAF Eastleigh, and about 500 personnel. RAF stations at Kisumu, Thika, and Mombasa (RAF Port Reitz) were thus eventually closed. No. 214 Squadron RAF made a six-month detachment to Eastleigh in 1951, during the Mau Mau Uprising. No. 1340 Flight RAF used the Harvard in Kenya against the Mau Mau in the 1950s, where they operated with 20 lb bombs and machine guns against the insurgents.

Units from the 1950s included:

- No. 78 Squadron RAF (Eastleigh 6 Mar - 13 Apr 1950)
- No. 683 Squadron RAF (Eastleigh 23 Apr - 24 Sep 1951)
- Eastleigh Communication Flight (15 Sep 1951 - Jun 1953)
- No 1340 (Anti Mau-Mau) Flight (31 Mar - Jun 1953, Apr 1954 - 30 Sep 1955)
- No. 142 Squadron RAF (Eastleigh 1 Feb - 1 Apr 1959)
- No. 208 Squadron RAF (Eastleigh 1 Apr 1959 - 29 Mar 1960, 3 Jun 1960 - 30 Jun 1961, 30 Nov - 9 Dec 1961)
- No. 21 Squadron RAF (Eastleigh 15 Sep 1959 - 1 Jun 1965)
- No. 30 Squadron RAF (Eastleigh 15 Nov 1959 - 1 Sep 1964)

The Air Officer Commanding served as air advisor to a number of former British territories in the region.
