= 795 Naval Air Squadron =

Inactive flying squadron of the Royal Navy's Fleet Air Arm

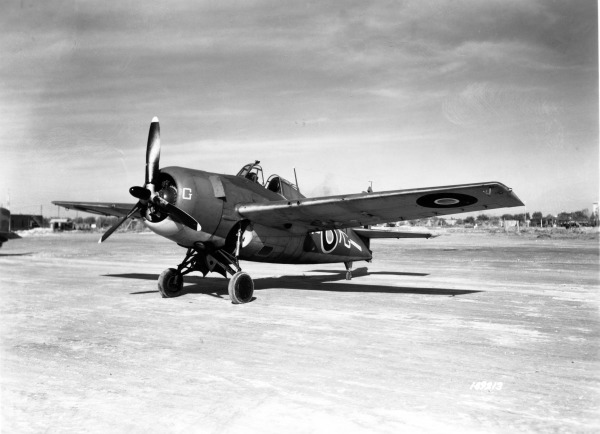
- Grumman Martlet Mk II, an example of the type used by 795 NAS
- Active: 1942–1943; 1946–1947
- Disbanded: 24 March 1947
- Country: United Kingdom
- Branch: Royal Navy
- Type: Fleet Air Arm Second Line Squadron
- Role: Eastern Fleet Fighter Pool; Refresher Training Squadron
- Size: Squadron
- Part of: Fleet Air Arm
- Home station: See Naval air stations section for full list.

Insignia
- Identification Markings: Letters only (1942 - 1943); A4+ (from 1946); 200-215 (later)
- Fin Carrier Code: A

Aircraft flown
- Attack: Fairey Firefly
- Fighter: Fairey Fulmar; Grumman Martlet; Hawker Sea Hurricane
- Trainer: North American Harvard

795 Naval Air Squadron (795 NAS), sometimes called 795 Squadron, is an inactive Fleet Air Arm (FAA) naval air squadron of the United Kingdom’s Royal Navy (RN) which last disbanded at RNAS Ford (HMS Peregrine), in West Sussex, during March 1947.

Originally formed as the Eastern Fleet Fighter Pool at RNAS Tanga (HMS Kilele), in Tanganyika, in June 1942, it’s 'A' Flight's supported the invasion of Madagascar, from HMS Illustrious, before being detached at Majunga on anti-submarine patrols as part of the Royal Air Force’s 207 Group. The squadron later moved to RNAS Mackinnon Road, in Kenya, before disbanding during August 1943.

It reformed as a Refresher Training Squadron at RNAS Eglinton (HMS Gannet), in Northern Ireland, in August 1946 as part of the Fleet Air Arm’s 52nd Training Air Group and later included a couple of deployments in HMS Implacable.

== History ==
=== Eastern Fleet Fighter Pool (1942–1943) ===
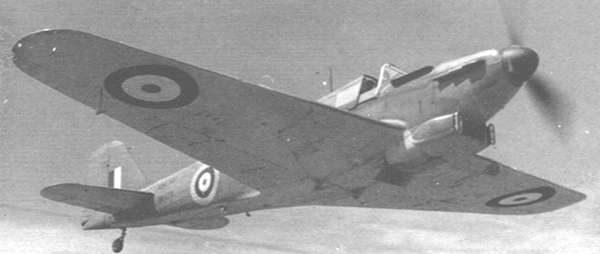
Fairey Fulmar Mk. II; an example of the type used by 795 Squadron

795 Naval Air Squadron formed at RNAS Tanga (HMS Kilele), Tanganyika Territory, East Africa, on 24 June 1942 as the Eastern Fleet Fighter Pool. It was initially equipped with Fairey Fulmar, a British carrier-borne reconnaissance and fighter aircraft, and Grumman Martlet, an American carrier-based fighter aircraft. As part of the Battle of Madagascar, 'A' Flight, which was formed of six Fairey Fulmar aircraft, embarked in the lead ship of her class of aircraft carrier HMS Illustrious along with the Fairey Albacore biplane torpedo bomber equipped 796 Naval Air Squadron, on 29 August. On 11 September the flight was put ashore at Majunga, Madagascar and was tasked to provide anti-submarine patrols, under the direction of No. 207 Group RAF. The Flight undertook a number of active sorties but in November it moved to the ex-seaplane tender HMS Albatross. The main section of the squadron had moved to RNAS Mackinnon Road, in Kenya, East Africa, on 19 September 1942 and remained there for almost a year. 795 Naval Air Squadron disbanded on 11 August 1943.

=== Refresher Training Squadron (1946–1947) ===
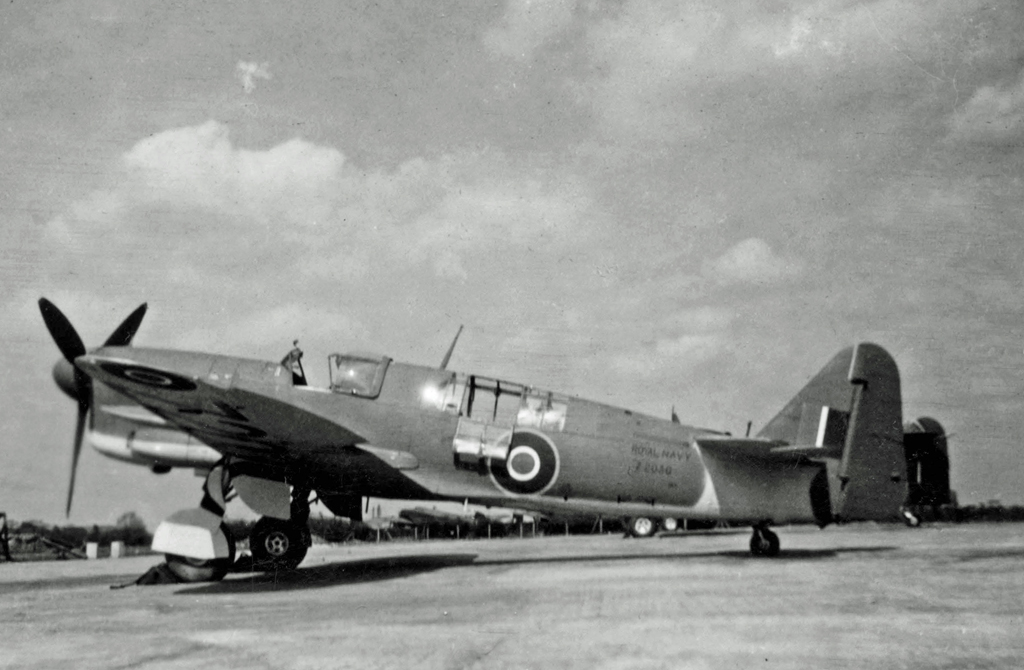
Fairey Firefly FR.1 'Z2030'; an example of the type used by 795 Squadron

795 Naval Air Squadron reformed as a Refresher Training squadron, on 1 August 1946 at RNAS Eglinton (HMS Gannet), and as part of the 52nd Training Air Group. The squadron was equipped with Fairey Firefly, a carrier-borne fighter aircraft and anti-submarine aircraft. Its role was to provide refresher training to aircraft carrier standard. On the 13 November 1946 the squadron exchanged Commanding Officer and staff with 719 Naval Air Squadron, then on 14 January 1947, the squadron embarked in HMS Implacable, the name ship of her class.

795 Naval Air Squadron disbanded for the second time on 24 March, the squadron disembarked from Implacable to RNAS Ford (HMS Peregrine), in Sussex, it’s aircraft flown to RNAS Stretton (HMS Blackcap), in Cheshire, to be put into storage, on the same day.

== Aircraft flown ==
The squadron has flown a number of different aircraft types and variants:

- Fairey Fulmar Mk.II carrier-based reconnaissance/fighter aircraft (May 1942 - June 1943)
- Grumman Martlet Mk I carrier-based fighter aircraft (1942)
- Grumman Martlet Mk II carrier-based fighter aircraft (September 1942 - April 1943)
- Grumman Martlet Mk III carrier-based fighter aircraft (November 1942 - August 1943)
- Grumman Martlet Mk IV carrier-based fighter aircraft (June - August 1943)
- North American Harvard Ila advanced trainer aircraft (June - September 1943)
- Hawker Sea Hurricane Mk IB fighter aircraft (December 1942 - January 1943)
- Fairey Firefly FR.I carrier-borne fighter, strike fighter and aerial reconnaissance aircraft (August - November 1946, November 1946 - March 1947)

== Naval air stations and aircraft carriers ==
795 Naval Air Squadron operated from a number of naval air stations of the Royal Navy, both in the UK and overseas and a number of Royal Navy aircraft carriers:

1942 - 1943

- Royal Naval Air Station Tanga (HMS Kilele), Tanganyika (now Tanzania), (24 June 1942 - 19 September 1942)
  - 'A' Flight - six Fairey Fulmar
    - HMS Illustrious, Illustrious-class aircraft carrier, (29 August 1942 - 11 September 1942)
    - Majunga, Madagascar, (11 September 1942 - 13 November 1942)
      - Antsirabe, Madagascar, (detachment three aircraft 12 October 1942 - 13 November 1942)
    - HMS Albatross, seaplane tender, (13 November 1942 - 15 November 1942)
    - Royal Naval Air Station Tanga (HMS Kilele), Tanganyika (now Tanzania), (15 November 1942 - )
- Royal Naval Air Station Mackinnon Road, Kenya, (19 September 1942 - 11 August 1943)
  - Royal Air Force Nakuru, Kenya, (detachment Flight attached to No. 70 OTU RAF) (26 April - 15 May 1943)
- disbanded - (11 August 1943)

1946 - 1947

- Royal Naval Air Station Eglinton (HMS Gannet), County Londonderry, (1 August 1946 - 13 August 1946)
- HMS Implacable, Implacable-class aircraft carrier, (13 August 1946 - 5 November 1946)
- Royal Naval Air Station Eglinton (HMS Gannet), County Londonderry, (5 November 1946 - 14 January 1947)
- HMS Implacable, Implacable-class aircraft carrier, (14 January 1947 - 24 March 1947)
- Royal Naval Air Station Stretton (HMS Blackcap), Cheshire, - aircraft - (24 March 1947)
- Royal Naval Air Station Ford (HMS Peregrine), West Sussex, - disbanded - (26 March 1947)

== Commanding officers ==
List of commanding officers of 795 Naval Air Squadron with date of appointment:

1942 - 1943

- Lieutenant O.N. Bailey, RN, from 24 June 1942
- Lieutenant Commander R. Pridham-Wippell, RN, from 10 November 1942
- Lieutenant N. Matthews, RN, from 1 March 1943
- Lieutenant Commander(A) G.W. Parish, DSC, RNVR, from 7 June 1943
- disbanded - 11 August 1943

1946 - 1947

- Lieutenant J.M. Brown, DSC, RN, from 10 August 1946
- Lieutenant C.R.J. Coxon, RN, from 13 November 1946
- disbanded - 26 March 1947

Note: Abbreviation (A) signifies Air Branch of the RN or RNVR.
