= Kunur =

Kunur may refer to:

- Kunur River, a river in West Bengal, India
- Kunnur, a village in Karnataka
- Koonur, a village in Telangana
- Coonoor, a town in Tamil Nadu
