= 796 Naval Air Squadron =

Inactive flying squadron of the Royal Navy's Fleet Air Arm

- Squadron badge
- Active: 1942–1944; 1947–1958
- Disbanded: 1 October 1958
- Country: United Kingdom
- Branch: Royal Navy
- Type: Fleet Air Arm Second Line Squadron
- Role: Eastern Fleet Torpedo Bomber Reconnaissance Pool; Aircrewman Training School
- Size: Squadron
- Part of: Fleet Air Arm
- Home station: See Naval air stations section for full list.
- Mottos: Ubi umus (Latin for 'We know where we are going')
- Aircraft: See Aircraft flown section for full list.

Insignia
- Squadron Badge Description: Per fess blue and barry wavy of four white and blue, a pair of dividers gold winged white (1949)
- Identification Markings: Letters only (1942 - 1944); 300-313 (Barracuda from November 1947); 210-290 & 360-378 (Firefly from November 1947); 360-380 (Firefly from February 1954); 761-794 (all types from January 1956)
- Fin Shore Codes: MF (Barracuda & Firefly from November 1947); CU (Firefly from February 1954); CU (all types from January 1956)

796 Naval Air Squadron (796 NAS) is an inactive Fleet Air Arm (FAA) naval air squadron of the United Kingdom’s Royal Navy (RN) which last disbanded at RNAS Culdrose in October 1958. It had reformed in November 1947 at HMS Vulture, RNAS St Merryn, as the Aircrewman Training School, however, its task changed to Observer School Part II in January 1950. The squadron moved to HMS Seahawk, RNAS Culdrose, in November 1953 and in 1957 took on the task of the disbanded 765 Naval Air Squadron.

796 Naval Air Squadron initially formed as the Eastern Fleet Torpedo Bomber Reconnaissance Pool, at RN Air Section Port Reitz, in Mombasa, in July 1942, it provided a detachment embarked in HMS Illustrious in August to support the invasion of Madagascar. This Flight also disembarked to Majunga in September to join 207 Group of the Royal Air Force and later rejoined the squadron at RNAS Tanga, in November and added operational training unit to its roles until disbanding in April 1944.

== History ==
=== Eastern Fleet Torpedo Bomber Reconnaissance Pool (1942-1944) ===
796 Naval Air Squadron formed on 25 July 1942 as the Eastern Fleet Torpedo Bomber Reconnaissance Pool, equipped with Fairey Albacore and Fairey Swordfish, both biplane torpedo bomber aircraft. The squadron started its existence at RN Air Section Port Reitz which had lodger facilities at RAF Port Reitz, situated at Mombasa, in Kenya and it’s allocated aircraft were from the recently disbanded 818 Naval Air Squadron. As part of the Battle of Madagascar, ‘A' Flight embarked in the lead ship of her class of aircraft carrier HMS Illustrious along with the Fairey Fulmar carrier-borne reconnaissance and fighter aircraft equipped 795 Naval Air Squadron, on 29 August.

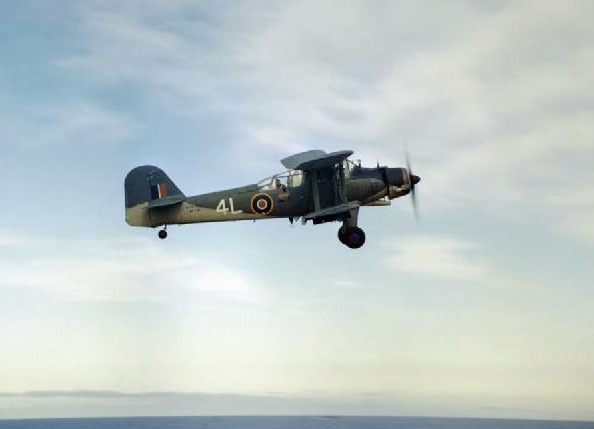
Fairey Albacore, an example of the type used by 796 NAS

The Flight disembarked to Majunga, Madagascar, during September and was placed under the control of the Royal Air Force's No. 207 (General Purpose) Group. On 30 September the main section of the squadron relocated from RN Air Section Port Reitz to RNAS Tanga (HMS Kilele), in Tanganyika, East Africa. It wasn't until November that the whole unit reassembled, with the Flight travelling from Majunga to RNAS Tanga and arriving by 17th of the month. Although 796 NAS continued as a Torpedo Bomber Reconnaissance Pool, it also effectively an became operational training unit, and was active for a further 5 months, until disbanding at RNAS Tanga on 28 April 1944.

=== Aircrewman Training School (1947-1958) ===
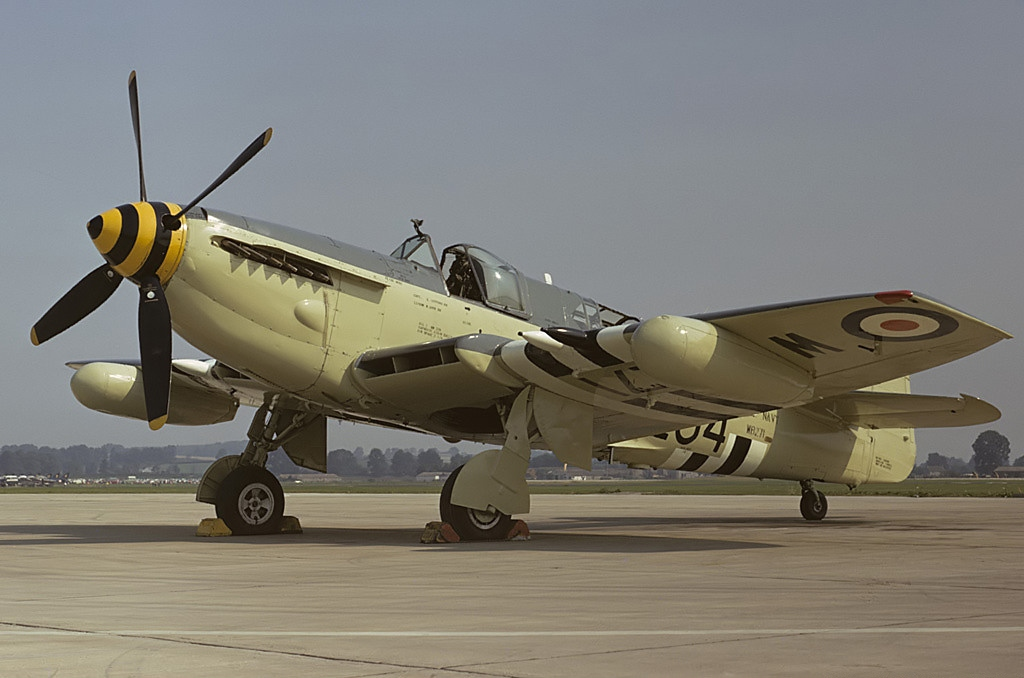
Fairey Firefly AS.5, an example of the type used by 796 NAS

796 Naval Air Squadron reformed on 13 November 1947, as the Aircrewman Training School, at RNAS St Merryn (HMS Vulture), Cornwall, England. It was initially equipped with Fairey Firefly FR.1, a carrier-borne fighter aircraft and anti-submarine aircraft. Fairey Barracuda Mk III, a British carrier-borne torpedo and dive bomber arrived during the latter part of 1949 and the Squadron’s role changed to that of Observer School Part II at the start of 1950. Fairey Firefly T.Mk 3, used for observer training, and AS.Mk 5 anti-submarine variant, were acquired in July, followed by AS.Mk 6 anti-submarine variant, at the end of 1951. The Fairey Barracuda element left 796 NAS to form 750 Naval Air Squadron, which was titled Observer School Part II, on 17 April 1952.

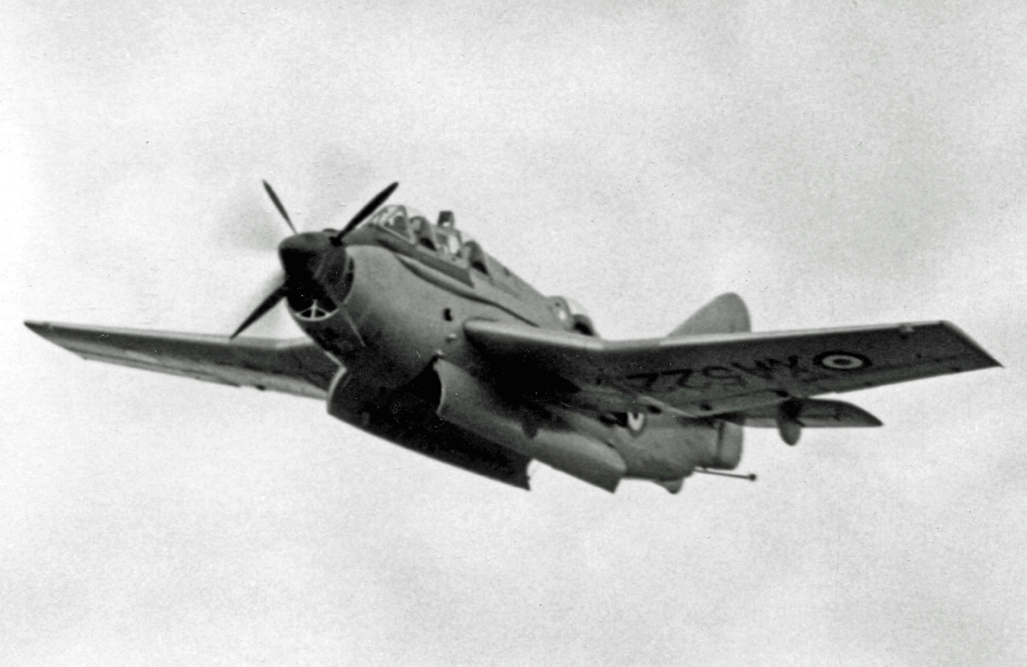
Fairey Gannet T.2 XA522, an example of the type used by 796 NAS

In June 1953 Fairey Firefly T.Mk 7, an anti-submarine training variant, were received and T.Mk 3s were withdrawn. In the following November, 796 Naval Air Squadron relocated to RNAS Culdrose (HMS Seahawk), remaining in Cornwall. When 765 Naval Air Squadron disbanded at RNAS Culdrose in March 1957, 796 NAS acquired its aircraft, Boulton Paul Sea Balliol, advanced two-seat trainer aircraft, and took on the role of the Piston Engine Pilots School. At this point the squadron also started to receive Fairey Gannet, a carrier borne anti-submarine warfare aircraft, and these replaced the Fairey Firefly. March 1958 saw the squadron help convert former Douglas Skyraider pilots onto Fairey Gannet aircraft utilising two of the Boulton Paul Sea Balliol. 796 Naval Air Squadron disbanded at RNAS Culdrose (HMS Seahawk) on 1 October 1958.

== Aircraft flown ==
The squadron has flown a number of different aircraft types and variants:

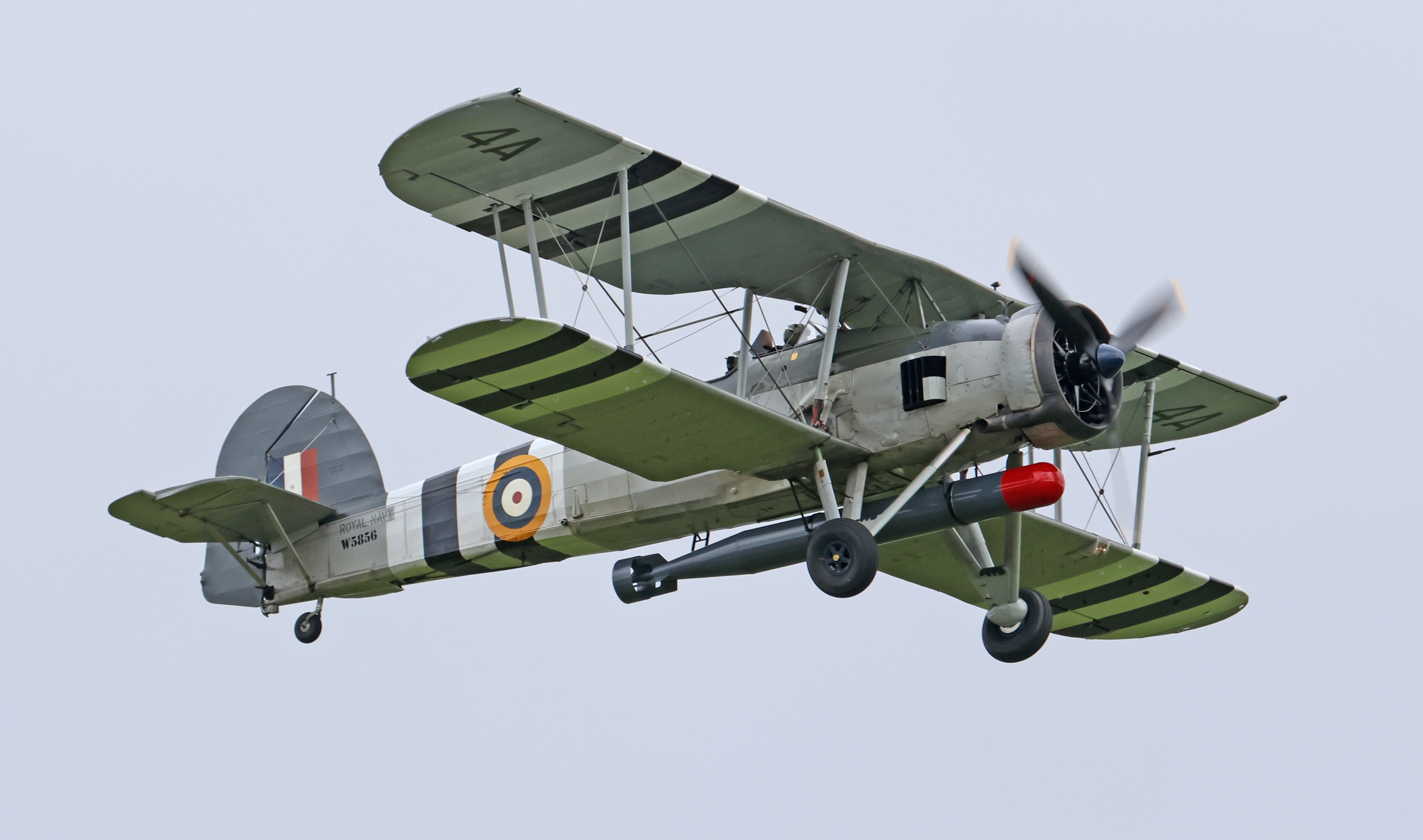
Fairey Swordfish

- Fairey Albacore torpedo bomber (July 1942 - July 1943)
- Fairey Swordfish I torpedo bomber (July 1942 - December 1943)
- Supermarine Walrus amphibious maritime patrol aircraft (March 1943 - February 1944)
- Fairey Swordfish Il torpedo bomber (September 1943 - March 1944)
- Fairey Firefly FR.1 carrier-borne fighter aircraft and anti-submarine aircraft (November 1947 - May 1951)
- de Havilland Tiger Moth trainer aircraft (January 1949 - January 1950)
- Fairey Barracuda III carrier-borne torpedo and dive bomber (November 1949 - February 1952)
- Fairey Firefly AS.5 carrier-borne fighter aircraft and anti-submarine aircraft (July 1950 - May 1952)
- Fairey Firefly T.3 carrier-borne fighter aircraft and anti-submarine aircraft (July 1950 - May 1954)
- Fairey Firefly AS.6 carrier-borne fighter aircraft and anti-submarine aircraft (December 1951 - December 1952)
- Fairey Firefly T.7 carrier-borne fighter aircraft and anti-submarine aircraft (May 1953 - December 1957)
- Fairey Gannet T.2 anti-submarine warfare aircraft (February 1957 - September 1958)
- Boulton Paul Sea Balliol T.21 advanced trainer aircraft (March 1957 - June 1958)
- Fairey Gannet AS.1 anti-submarine warfare aircraft (April 1957 - September 1958)

== Naval air stations and aircraft carriers ==
796 Naval Air Squadron operated from a number of naval air stations of the Royal Navy, both in the UK and overseas and a Royal Navy aircraft carrier:

1942 - 1944

- RN Air Section Port Reitz, Kenya, (25 July 1942 - 30 September 1942)
  - 'A' Flight - six Fairey Albacores
    - HMS Illustrious (6 - 9 September 1942)
    - Pamanzi, Mayotte, (9 - 11 September 1942)
    - Majunga, Madagascar, (11 September 1942 - 3 October 1942)
    - Ivato (Tananarive), Madagascar, (3 - 11 October 1942)
    - Antsirabe, Madagascar, (11 - 25 October 1942)
    - Camp Robin, Madagascar, (25 October 1942 - 13 November 1942)
    - transit (aircraft)/HMS Albatross (ground crews) 13 - 17 November 1942)
    - Royal Naval Air Station Tanga (HMS Kilele), Tanzania, reunited with 'B' Flight (17 November 1942)
- Royal Naval Air Station Tanga (HMS Kilele), Tanzania, 'B’ Flight (30 September 1942 - 28 April 1944)
  - Royal Air Force Eastleigh, Kenya, (Detachment 22 June - 22 November 1943)
- disbanded - (28 April 1944)

1947 - 1958

- Royal Naval Air Station St Merryn (HMS Vulture), Cornwall, (13 November 1947 - 30 November 1953)
  - Royal Air Force St Eval, Cornwall, (Detachment ten aircraft 28 August - 28 September 1948)
  - HMS Illustrious (Detachment Deck Landing Training 28 September - 2 October 1948)
- Royal Naval Air Station Culdrose (HMS Seahawk), Cornwall, (30 November 1953 - 1 October 1958)
- disbanded - (1 October 1958)

== Commanding officers ==
List of commanding officers of 796 Naval Air Squadron with date of appointment:

1942 - 1944

- Lieutenant(A) H.E. Shilbach, RNVR, from 25 July 1942
- Lieutenant N.T. O'Neil, RN, from 19 August 1942
- Lieutenant N. Matthews, RN, from 10 October 1942
- Lieutenant(A) A.J.I. Temple-West, RN, from 12 January 1943
- Lieutenant Commander(A) M.W. Rudorf, DSC, RN, from 14 July 1943
- Lieutenant T.G.V. Percy, RN, from 10 November 1943
- disbanded - 28 April 1944

1947 - 1958

- Lieutenant P.J, Hutton, DSC, RN, from 13 November 1947
- Lieutenant Commander R.D. Henderson, RN, from 25 October 1949
- Lieutenant Commander T.J. Harris, RN, from 1 May 1950
- Lieutenant(E) S.E. Adams, RN, from 7 December 1951
- Lieutenant Commander J.S. Barnes, RN, from 16 January 1952
- Lieutenant Commander L.R. Tivy, RN, from 12 August 1953
- Lieutenant Commander P. Cane, RN, from 17 January 1955
- Lieutenant Commander A.M. Dennis, RN, from 22 February 1955
- Lieutenant Commander N.J. Ovenden, RN, from 30 November 1956
- Lieutenant Commander W.L. Hughes, RN, from 14 March 1957
- Lieutenant Commander A.H. Smith, RN, from 6 January 1958
- Lieutenant Commander L.D.M. Searson, RN, from 10 January 1958
- disbanded - 1 October 1958

Note: Abbreviation (A) signifies Air Branch of the RN or RNVR.
