= 788 Naval Air Squadron =

Inactive flying squadron of the Royal Navy's Fleet Air Arm

- Squadron badge
- Active: 1942–1945
- Disbanded: 11 June 1945
- Country: United Kingdom
- Branch: Royal Navy
- Type: Fleet Air Arm Second Line Squadron
- Role: Eastern Fleet Torpedo Bomber Reconnaissance Pool; Fleet Requirements Unit
- Size: Squadron
- Part of: Fleet Air Arm
- Home station: See Naval air stations section for full list.
- Mottos: Toyari saa yote (Swahili for 'Ready at all hours')
- Aircraft: See Aircraft flown section for full list.

Insignia
- Squadron Badge Description: Blue, over water in base barry wavy of four white and blue two flashes of lightning in saltire white surmounted by a target proper pierced in the bull by an arrow gold flighted white (1944)

788 Naval Air Squadron (788 NAS), sometimes referred to as 788 Squadron, is an inactive Fleet Air Arm (FAA) naval air squadron of the United Kingdom's Royal Navy (RN) which last disbanded during June 1945.

The squadron formed at RN Air Section China Bay in Ceylon, in January 1942, as the British Eastern Fleet's Torpedo Bomber Reconnaissance Pool, however it lost half its strength during the heavy raids by Japanese carrier-borne aircraft in the April.

The squadron regrouped at RNAS Tanga (HMS Kilele) in Tanganyika, East Africa to become a Fleet Requirements Unit and relocating almost immediately to RN Air Section Port Reitz, in Mombasa, where it remained operational for the next three years.

== History ==
=== Eastern Fleet's TBR Pool (1942) ===
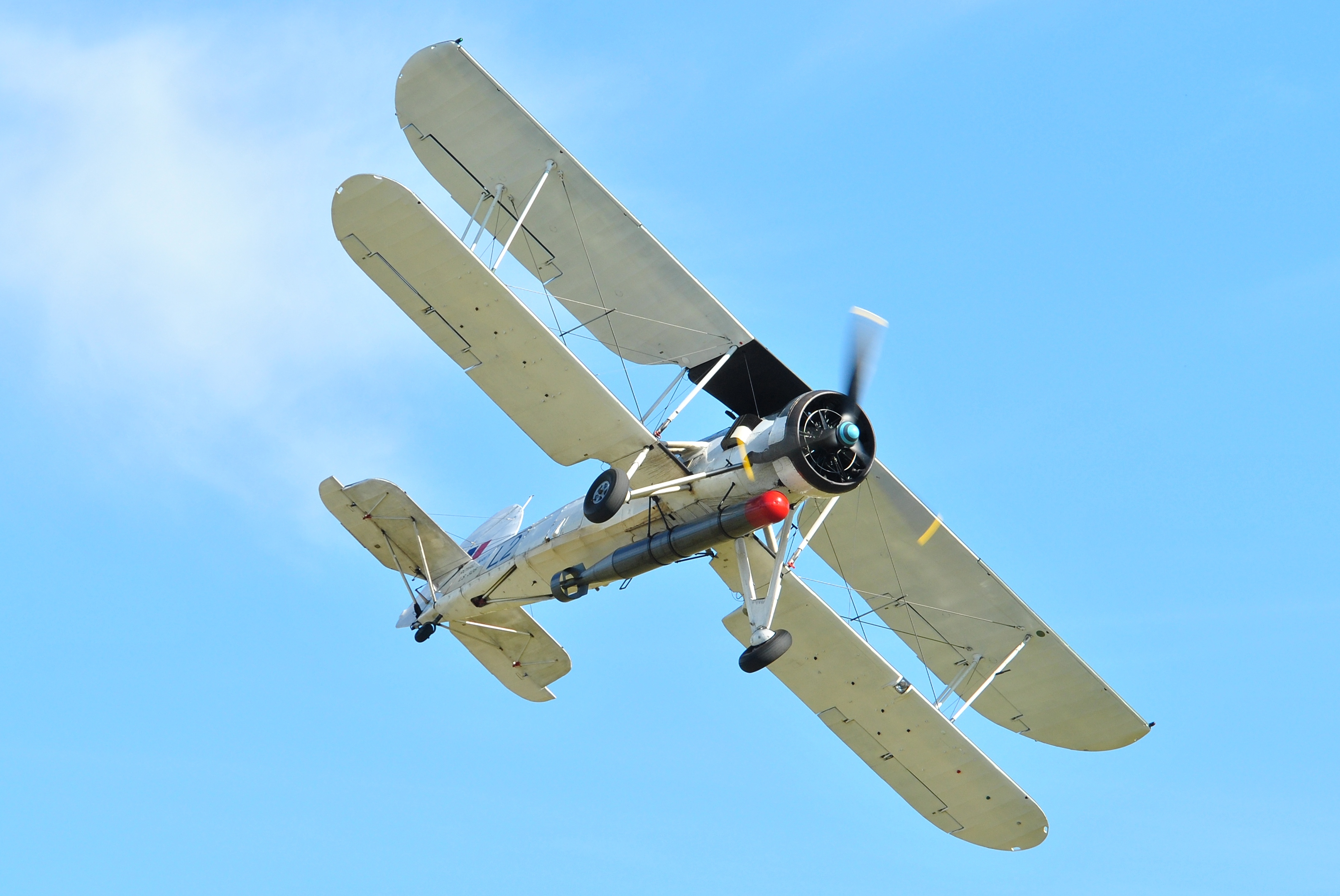
Fairey Swordfish, an example of the type used by 788 NAS

788 Naval Air Squadron Formed at RN Air Section China Bay which had lodger facilities at RAF China Bay, in British Ceylon (now Sri Lanka), on 18 January 1942, as the British Eastern Fleet's Torpedo Bomber Reconnaissance Pool.

On 5 April six of its Fairey Swordfish torpedo bomber aircraft were shot down by Imperial Japanese Navy carrier-borne aircraft, whilst they were flying to collect torpedoes for an attack on the Japanese aircraft carriers. The remainder of the unit then travelled to East Africa.

=== Fleet Requirements Unit (1942–1945) ===
The remnants of the Eastern Fleet TBR Pool, relocated to RNAS Tanga (HMS Kilele), in Tanganyika Territory, East Africa, to regroup, re-equip and to reform as a Fleet Requirements Unit (FRU) on 20 May 1942. On 24 June 1942 the squadron relocated to RN Air Section Port Reitz which had lodger facilities at RAF Port Reitz, Mombasa, Kenya and started its role as a FRU. Shortages of equipment and lack of re supply led to the unit operating a variety of aircraft with Fairey Albacore, a biplane torpedo bomber, Fairey Fulmar, a carrier-borne reconnaissance and fighter aircraft, Hawker Sea Hurricane, a navalised version of the Hawker Hurricane single-engine single-seat fighter aircraft, Blackburn Skua, a carrier-based dive bomber/fighter aircraft and Fairey Swordfish, a biplane torpedo bomber. A detached section operated from RAF Eastleigh, in Nairobi, Kenya, between May and November 1943.

1944 saw the squadron receive some new aircraft and it was equipped with four Boulton Paul Defiant target tug variants, two Bristol Beaufighter, a British multi-role aircraft and a Supermarine Walrus amphibious maritime patrol aircraft. 788 Naval Air Squadron disbanded at RN Air Section Port Reitz, Mombasa, on 11 June 1945.

== Aircraft flown ==
The squadron has operated a number of different aircraft types, including:

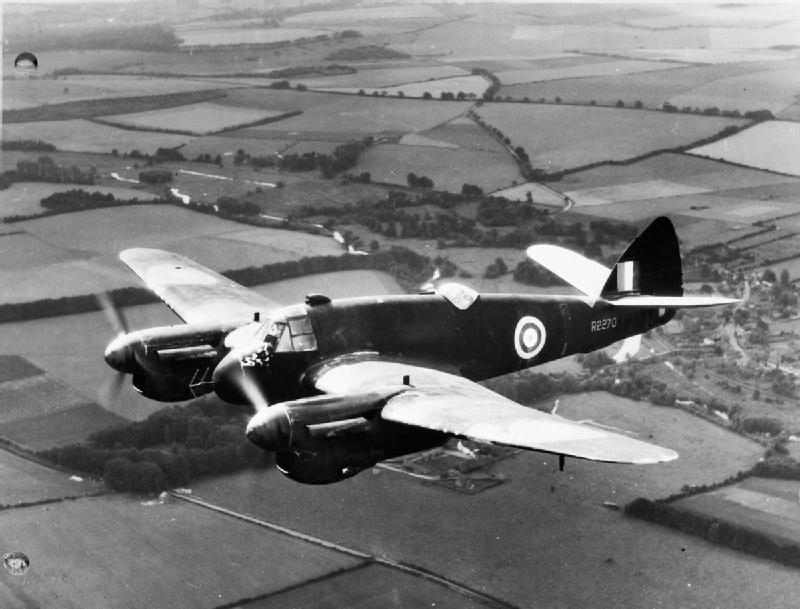
Bristol Beaufighter Mk IIF night fighter

- Fairey Swordfish I torpedo bomber (February 1942 - June 1944)
- Fairey Albacore torpedo bomber (February 1942 - March 1944)
- Blackburn Skua carrier-based dive bomber/fighter aircraft (May 1942 - January 1944)
- Fairey Swordfish II torpedo bomber (May 1942 - June 1944)
- Fairey Fulmar Mk.II reconnaissance/fighter aircraft (May 1942 - July 1944)
- Supermarine Walrus amphibious maritime patrol aircraft (May 1942 - June 1945)
- Hawker Sea Hurricane Mk IB fighter aircraft (1942)
- Bristol Blenheim light bomber (1942)
- Hawker Hurricane Mk.IIB fighter aircraft (January 1944)
- Boulton Paul Defiant TT Mk I target tug (February 1944 - June 1945)
- Bristol Beaufighter Mk.IIF night fighter (April 1944 - January 1945)
- Bristol Beaufort Mk.I torpedo bomber (1945)

== Naval air stations ==
788 Naval Air Squadron operated from a number of naval air stations of the Royal Navy, located overseas:

- RN Air Section China Bay, Ceylon, (16 February 1942 - 8 May 1942)
- HMS Athene (passage 8 May 1942 - 20 May 1942)
- Royal Naval Air Station Tanga (HMS Kilele), Tanzania, (20 May 1942 - 24 June 1942)
- RN Air Section Port Reitz, Kenya, (24 June 1942 - 11 June 1945)
  - Royal Air Force Eastleigh, Kenya, (Detachment 1 May - 7 November 1943)
- disbanded - 11 June 1945

== Commanding officers ==
List of commanding officers of 788 Naval Air Squadron with date of appointment:

- Lieutenant Commander C.A. Kingsley-Rowe, RN, from 16 February 1942
- Major V.B.G. Cheesman, RM, from 1 May 1942
- Lieutenant E.M, Britton, RN, from 7 August 1942
- Lieutenant W.N. Waller, RN, from 25 August 1942
- Lieutenant Commander(A) E.H. Horn, RNVR, from 12 August 1943
- Lieutenant Commander(A) J.A. Ansell, RNVR, from 25 October 1943
- Lieutenant Commander(A) F.G. Hood, SANF(V), from 15 August 1944
- disbanded - 11 June 1945

Note: Abbreviation (A) signifies Air Branch of the RN or RNVR.
