= Eastleigh Airport =

Eastleigh Airport may refer to:

- Moi Air Base, formerly RAF Eastleigh and Eastleigh Airport, Kenya
- Southampton Airport, formerly Eastleigh airfield and RAF Eastleigh, England
