= Tanga Airport =

Airport located in Tanga Region, Tanzania

Tanga Airport Uwanja wa Ndege wa Tanga (Swahili)
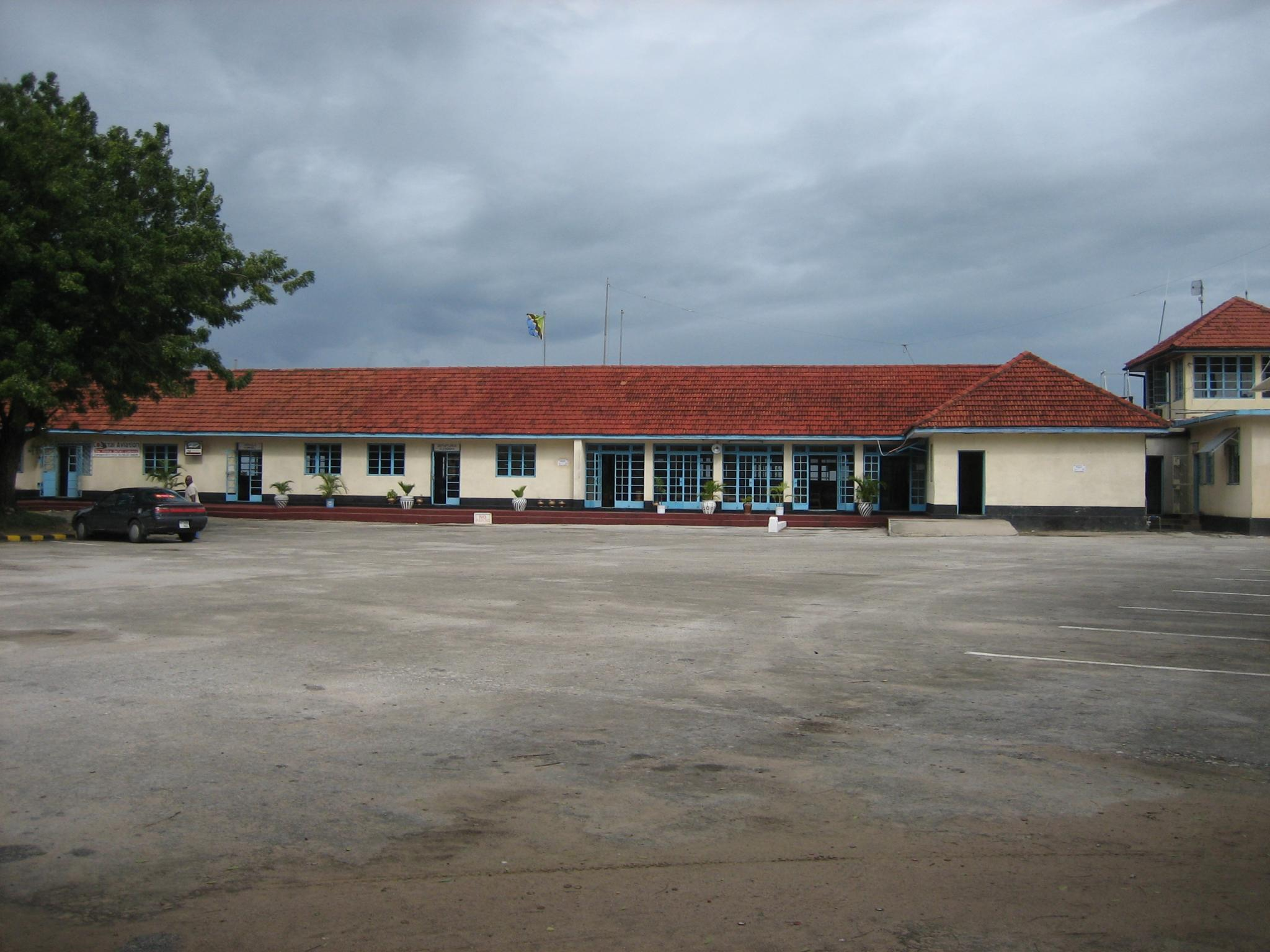
- Terminal building

- Location of airport within the city
- IATA: TGT; ICAO: HTTG; WMO: 63844

Summary
- Airport type: Public
- Operator: Tanzania Airports Authority
- Serves: City of Tanga, Tanzania
- Location: Mwanzange, Tanga City Council, Tanga Region
- Elevation AMSL: 39 m / 128 ft
- Coordinates: 5°5′31.52″S 39°4′18″E
- Website: www.taa.go.tz

Map
- Location of airport in Tanzania

Runways
| Direction | Length | | Surface |
| Direction | m | ft | Surface |
|---|---|---|---|
| 06/24 | 1,255 | 4,117 | Asphalt |
| 14/32 | 1,388 | 4,554 | Grass |

Statistics (2024)
- Passengers: 18,259
- Aircraft movements: 2,604
- Sources: TAA GCM Google Maps

Tanga Airport (IATA: TGT, ICAO: HTTG) (Uwanja wa Ndege wa Tanga, in Swahili) is a small domestic airport located in Mwanzange ward of Tanga City Council in Tanga Region, Tanzania. It is the sole airport in the regional capital city of Tanga.

It is 3 kilometres (1.9 mi) west of the city, off the A14 trunk road. The airport is scheduled flights to Arusha, Dar es Salaam and the Zanzibar Archipelago islands of Unguja and Pemba.

The Tanga non-directional beacon (Ident: TG) is located on the field.

== History ==
=== World War II ===
During the Second World War, the airfield functioned as a base for the Royal Navy, providing accommodation for disembarked Fleet Air Arm squadrons, facilities for the assembly of small aircraft, and torpedo facilities. Known as Royal Naval Air Station Tanga (RNAS Tanga), it was inaugurated in May 1942 and subsequently commissioned as HMS Kilele on 1 October. It had three intersecting landing strips which were hard, grass-covered soil and approxiamatley 200 yards (183 m) wide.

Details of runways
| Orientation | Length |
|---|---|
| 01/19 (NorthWest–SouthEast) | 1,150 yards (1,052 m) |
| 07/25 (North East-South West) | 1,660 yards (1,518 m) |
| 14/32 (South East–North West) | 1,600 yards (1,463 m). |

The squadrons listed below were either stationed there or were disembarked from aircraft carriers. HMS Kilele was decommissioned on 31 May 1944, transitioning to care and maintenance under the records of HMS Tana.

==== Squadrons at HMS Kilele ====
List of Fleet Air Arm first and second line squadrons, either based at or disembarked to RNAS Tanga (HMS Kilele):

- 788 Naval Air Squadron, designated as a Fleet Requirements Unit (FRU), relocated from the RN Air Section at RAF China Bay, Ceylon, on 20 May 1942. This unit represented the remnants of the Eastern Fleet's Torpedo Bomber Reconnaissance (TBR) Pool, which was transferred here for the purposes of regrouping, re-equipping, and reforming as an FRU. Subsequently, it was moved to RNAS Kilindini (HMS Kipanga) in Mombasa, Kenya, on 24 June 1942.
- 795 Naval Air Squadron was established at this location on 24 June 1942, designated as the Eastern Fleet Fighter Pool. The squadron relocated to RNAS Mackinnon Road, Kenya, on 19 September 1942. Its initial equipment included Grumman Martlet fighter aircraft and Fairey Fulmar fighter/reconnaissance aircraft.
- 796 Naval Air Squadron served as the Torpedo Bomber Reconnaissance Pool for the Eastern Fleet. It relocated to this site from RN Air Section Port Reitz, at RAF Port Reitz, Mombasa, Kenya, on 30 September 1942. The squadron was disbanded at this location on 28 March 1944. Its equipment included Fairey Albacore and Fairey Swordfish torpedo bombers.
- 803 Naval Air Squadron, classified as a Fleet Fighter Squadron, relocated to this site from RN Air Section Port Reitz on 29 August 1942. It embarked in HMS Illustrious on 7 December 1942. Subsequently, it returned to RNAS Tanga on 12 January 1943. It incorporated 806 Squadron four days thereafter, thereby augmenting its fleet of aircraft. The squadron was officially disbanded at this location on 12 August 1943.
- 806 Naval Air Squadron A Flight disembarked from HMS Indomitable on 20 June 1942. Equipped with Grumman Martlet Mk II fighter aircraft, it re-embarked on 8 July 1942. Returning it was disbanded into 803 Squadron on 18 January 1943. The squadron was by then equipped with Fairey Fulmar Mk.II.
- 810 Naval Air Squadron disembarked from HMS Illustrious on 18 August 1942 and left for the RN Air Section at RAF Port Reitz on 30 August 1942. Subsequently, it disembarked from HMS Illustrious on 20 October 1942 and re-embarked on 8 December 1942, being equipped with Fairey Swordfish II.
- 829 Naval Air Squadron disembarked from HMS Illustrious on 18 August 1942 and it conducted daily detachments to RN Air Section Port Reitz. The squadron was equipped with Fairey Swordfish II. It re-embarked on 29 August 1942.

== Airlines and destinations ==
| Airlines | Destinations |
|---|---|
| As Salaam Air | Pemba |
| Auric Air | Pemba, Zanzibar |
| Coastal Aviation | Arusha, Dar es Salaam, Pemba, Zanzibar |

== Traffic and statistics ==
Passenger numbers at Tanga
| Year | Passengers handled | Cargo (tonnes) | Aircraft movements |
|---|---|---|---|
| 1999 | 918 | – | 314 |
| 2000 | 963 | – | 297 |
| 2001 | 3,407 | – | 782 |
| 2002 | 9,552 | – | 1,336 |
| 2003 | 5,864 | – | 1,084 |
| 2004 | 7,113 | – | 1,324 |
| 2005 | 7,153 | 11.857 | 1,250 |
| 2006 | 8,201 | 32.133 | 1,410 |
| 2007 | 7,705 | 30.310 | 1,289 |
| 2008 | 8,447 | 35.245 | 1,588 |
| 2009 | 9,759 | 45.121 | 1,534 |
| 2010 | 9,277 | 38.919 | 1,552 |
| 2011 | 13,509 | – | 2,286 |
| 2012 | 20,020 | 10.000 | 3,339 |
| 2013 | 21,271 | – | 3,444 |

== See also ==
- List of airports in Tanzania
- Transport in Tanzania
