= No. 1340 Flight RAF =

No. 1340 Flight
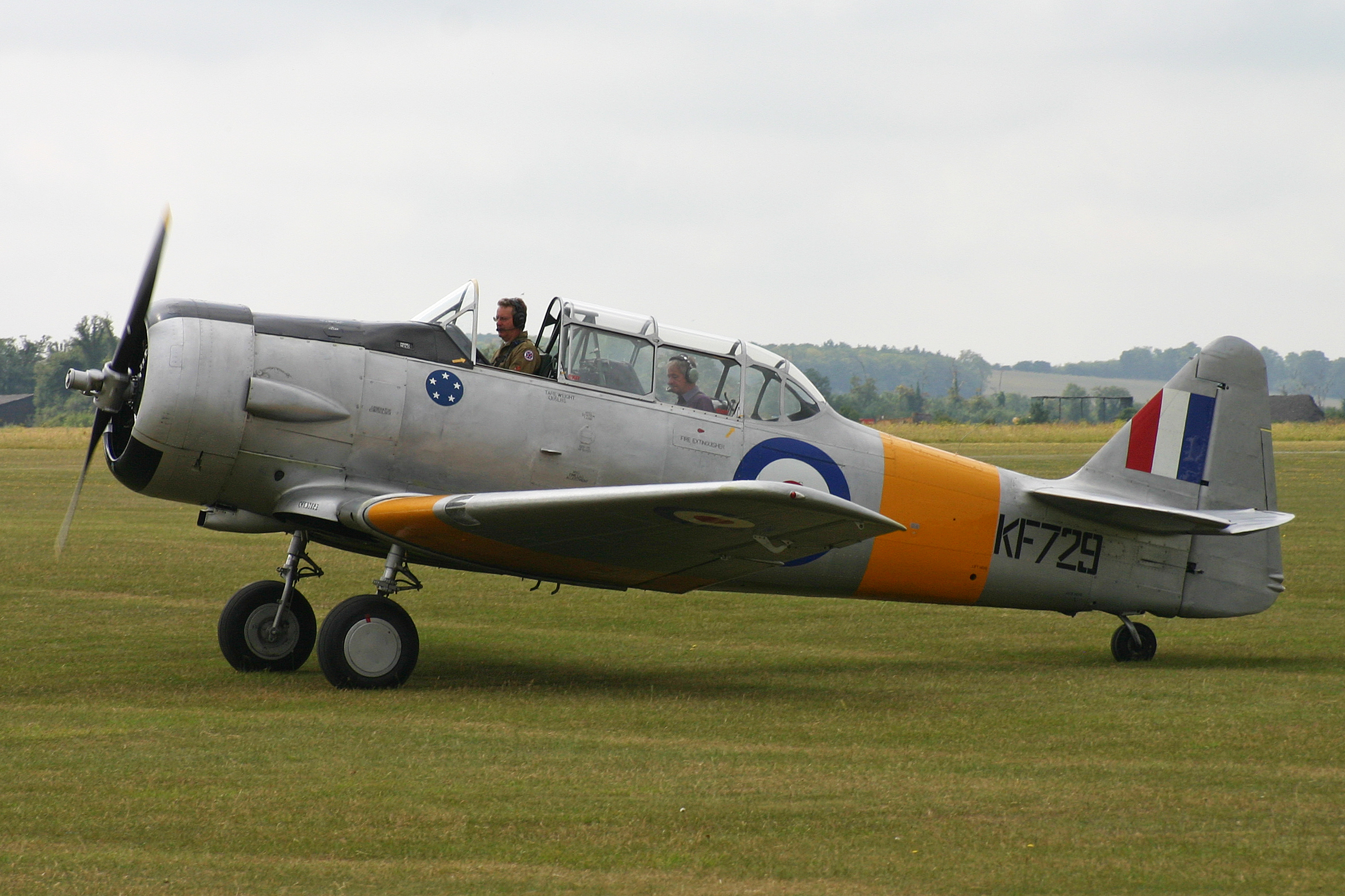
- Harvard T-6H, with colour scheme similar to those flown by No. 1340 Flight RAF in Kenya. (Note: This is a Harvard T-6H painted as Prince Philip's KF729. It was built after 1945 by Canadian Car & Foundry and used by the Italian Air Force. Currently (2018) at IWM Duxford.) (Note: Coincidentally, Harvard IIBs were powered by the Pratt & Whitney R-1340 Wasp radial engine.)
- Active: 1945 – 31 Mar 1946; 23 Mar 1953 – 30 Sep 1955
- Disbanded: 30 September 1955
- Country: United Kingdom
- Branch: Royal Air Force

Commanders
- Notable commanders: Squadron Leader Charles "Porky" Jeffries

Aircraft flown
- Bomber: Vultee Vengeance Mk. III
- Trainer: North American Harvard II & IIB

No. 1340 (Special Duties) Flight RAF (1340 Flt) was a flight of the Royal Air Force. In its first formation in India it was equipped with Vultee Vengeance Mk. IIIs and a single North American Harvard. In its second formation in Kenya it flew Harvards built under licence in Canada by Noorduyn.

Although Harvards were mostly used by the RAF as trainers or target tugs, the aircraft of 1340 Flt in Kenya were armed with 20 lb (9.1 kg) bombs and a machine-gun, for operations against the Mau Mau in Kenya in the early 1950s.

== History ==
=== First formation ===
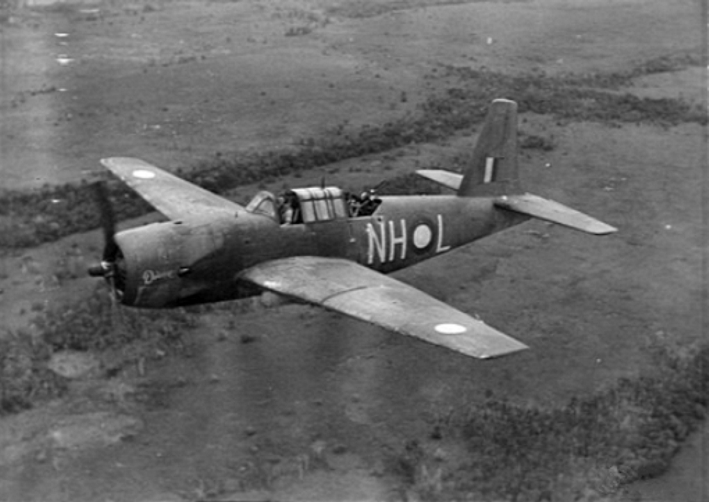
A Vengeance dive bomber of the RAAF in 1943

1340 Flt was first formed c1945 at the Royal Indian Air Force base at Sulur, Kerala State, India. It was equipped with three Vultee Vengeance Mk. IIIs and a Harvard IIB.

The flight was formed to carry out trials of mustard gas attacks for the Chemical Defence Research Department (India) (CDRD, now at Porton Down, Wiltshire), in preparation for expected similar attacks by the Japanese, who had already used it during the Second Sino-Japanese War. The flight was nominally under the control of 225 Group in Bangalore, part of Air Headquarters, RAF India, but flew under the direction of CDRD.

==== Operations ====
The Vengeances dropped 65-lb canisters and 500 lb clusters of mustard gas, and also sprayed it on Indian troops on the ground to test anti-gas protection such as gas capes and footwear. The unprotected troops, who may have been unaware of the danger, suffered many burns and blisters.

The flight transferred to from Sulur to Cannonore (Kannur), Kerala State on 11 October 1945, where an airstrip was created on the maidan, a large public area overlooking the sea. There were two trials ranges, at Kumbla and Porkal, situated on the coast approx 40 miles (65 km) N. of Cannanore. Further chemical weapons trials continued until February 1946 when the surplus stocks of gas were dumped at sea. 1340 Flt disbanded on 31 March 1946. (Note: NB Kannur is not to be confused with Kunnur or Coonoor.)

==== Incidents ====
On 5 December 1945 W/Cdr Edmondes took off solo in his Harvard (FE965) to make a reconnaissance round the Porkal area. His engined failed, and he made a successful forced landing in a paddy field about 10 miles inland. He was unhurt.

=== Second formation ===
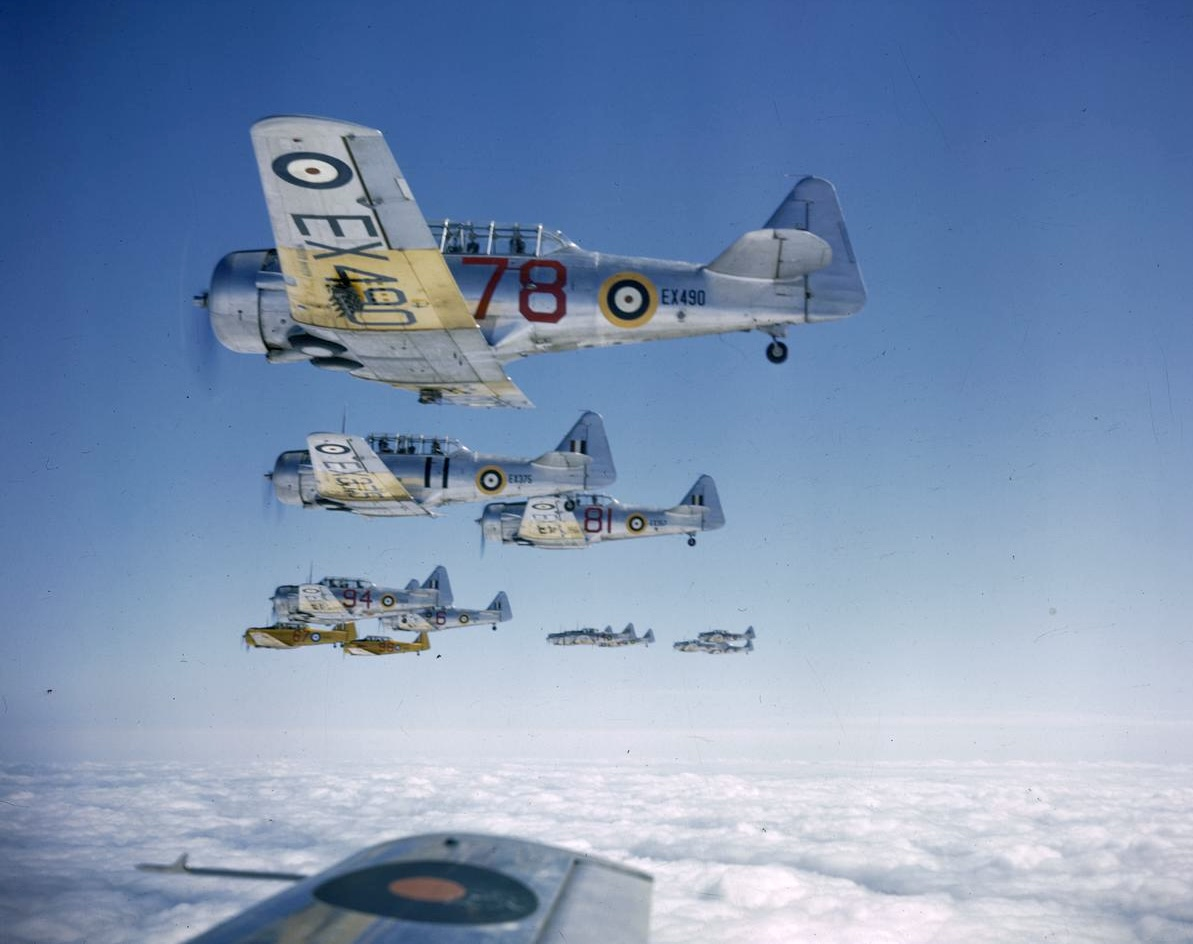
Harvard trainers over Rhodesia 1943

The flight was re-formed on 23 March 1953 as No. 1340 Flight RAF at RAF Thornhill, Gwelo, Southern Rhodesia (now Gweru-Thornhill Air Base, Zimbabwe), in response to the Mau Mau uprising in neighbouring Kenya. The Harvard IIB aircraft came from No. 5 Flying Training School RAF (3rd Formation) based at Thornhill, part of the Rhodesian Air Training Group. The Harvards had been previously temporarily based at No. 4 Flying Training School RAF at RAF Heany, near Bulawayo.

Although some Harvards from Thornhill had been offered in February 1953 to the Kenyan authorities on the advice of General William "Looney" Hinde, the Director of Operations, a decision wasn't taken until the Chief of the Imperial General Staff, General Sir John Harding, visited Kenya to see the worsening security situation. Twelve Harvards from Thornhill were recommended to support two infantry battalions and an infantry brigade headquarters (39 Brigade), to restore security. Winston Churchill's cabinet endorsed the move on 10 March, and by the end of the month the establishment of 1340 Flight was formally approved.

The flight arrived at RAF Eastleigh, Nairobi, Kenya, on 27 March 1953, commanded by Squadron Leader Charles G. St. David Jefferies, equipped with 12 Noorduyn Harvard IIBs, eight operational and four in reserve, with two being serviced any one time.

The aircraft were fitted with bomb racks under the wings to take eight 20 lb (9.1 kg) fragmentation bombs and a single Browning .303 machine gun under the starboard wing, with the ammunition carried inside the wing. Because of the wooded terrain, the Harvards weren't used for two months because General Hinde thought they would be ineffective.

The RAF was assisted by five Piper PA-22 Tri-Pacer aircraft belonging to the Kenya Police Reserve Air Wing (KPRW). In October 1953 six RAF pilots were seconded to the KRPW to fly the Tri-Pacers. Being on secondment, the pilots adopted the attitude to discipline of the Kenya Police; it was somewhat more relaxed than that of the RAF. The Tri-Pacers weren't originally armed, although they were later fitted with a single rack for four 20 lb (9.1 kg) bombs behind the rear of cabin.

1340 Flight, along with the KPRW Tri-Pacers deployed forward from Eastleigh to Nyeri airfield, which lay between Mount Kenya and the Aberdare Range, and a basic Operations Centre was set up in the nearby town of Mweiga. An RAF Regiment detachment eventually took over airfield defence from the RAF groundcrew.

==== Operations ====
Working with the Army or local security forces on the ground, the Tri-Pacers would drop phosphorus grenades (e.g. No. 76 Special Incendiary Grenade) from the cockpit as markers, followed by the flight of eight Harvards which dropped their bombs on the target. From November 1953 various detachments of Avro Lincoln bombers were also stationed at RAF Eastleigh, armed with fourteen 500 lb (230 kg) bombs: No. 49 Squadron RAF, No. 100 Squadron RAF, No. 61 Squadron RAF, No. 214 Squadron RAF, and 49 Squadron again from December 1954.

There was a lack of coordination between the various armed services until May 1954 when Air Commodore Walter Beisiegel was appointed as Senior RAF Officer (SRAFO). He stayed until September 1955 and improved the process of target-marking by the Piper Tri-Pacers and the bombing of the Mau Mau by the Harvards and Lincolns.

No. 1340 Flight was disbanded on 30 September 1955. During the course of the Mau Mau emergency, the flight had dropped 21,936 20-lb. bombs and lost five aircraft in accidents.

==== Incidents ====
Three Tri-Pacers were also lost to accidents.

== See also ==
- List of Royal Air Force aircraft independent flights
- List of British Commonwealth Air Training Plan facilities in Southern Rhodesia
