= Domestic airport =

Airport handling only flights within the same country

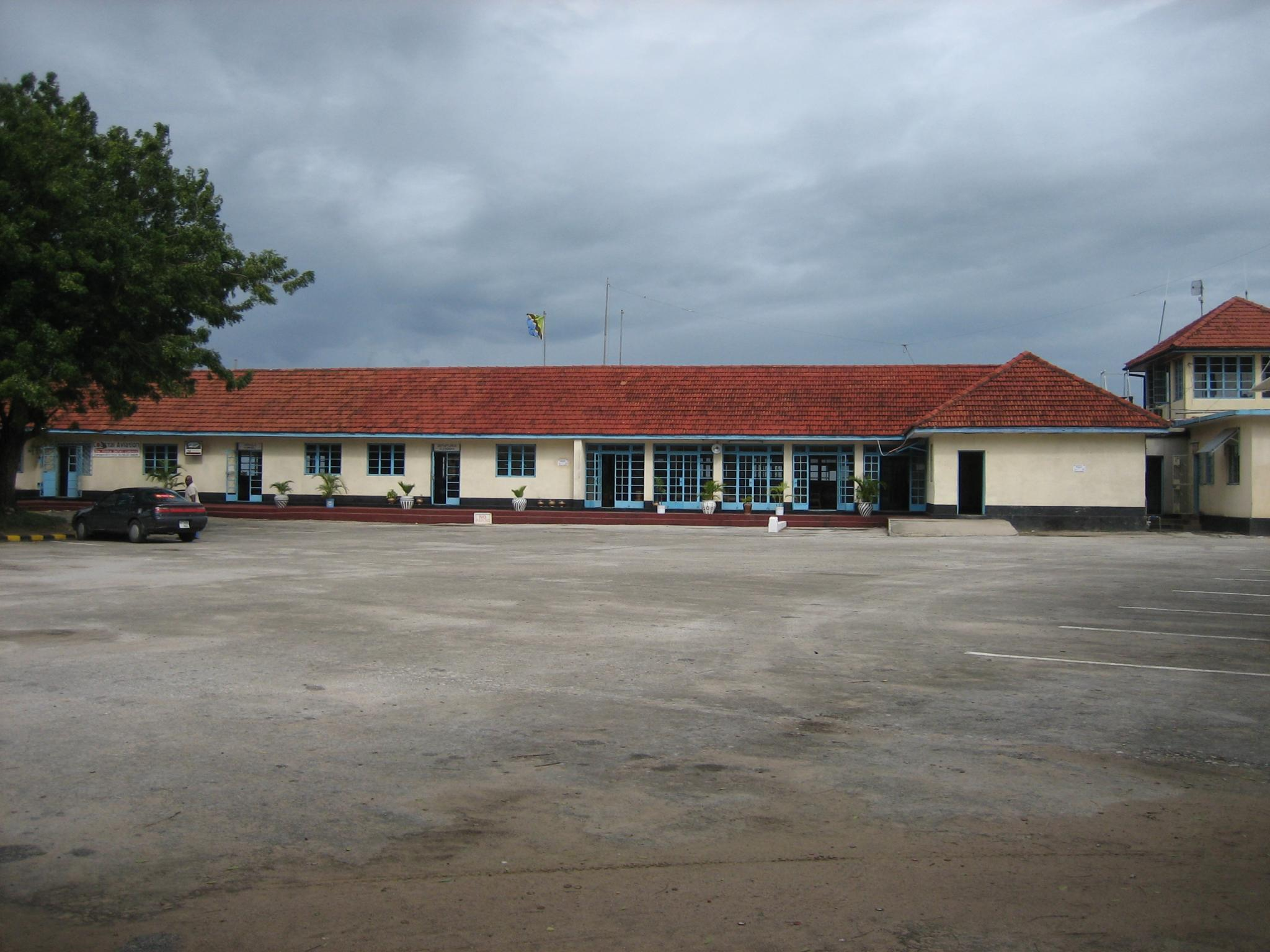
Tanga Airport in Tanzania

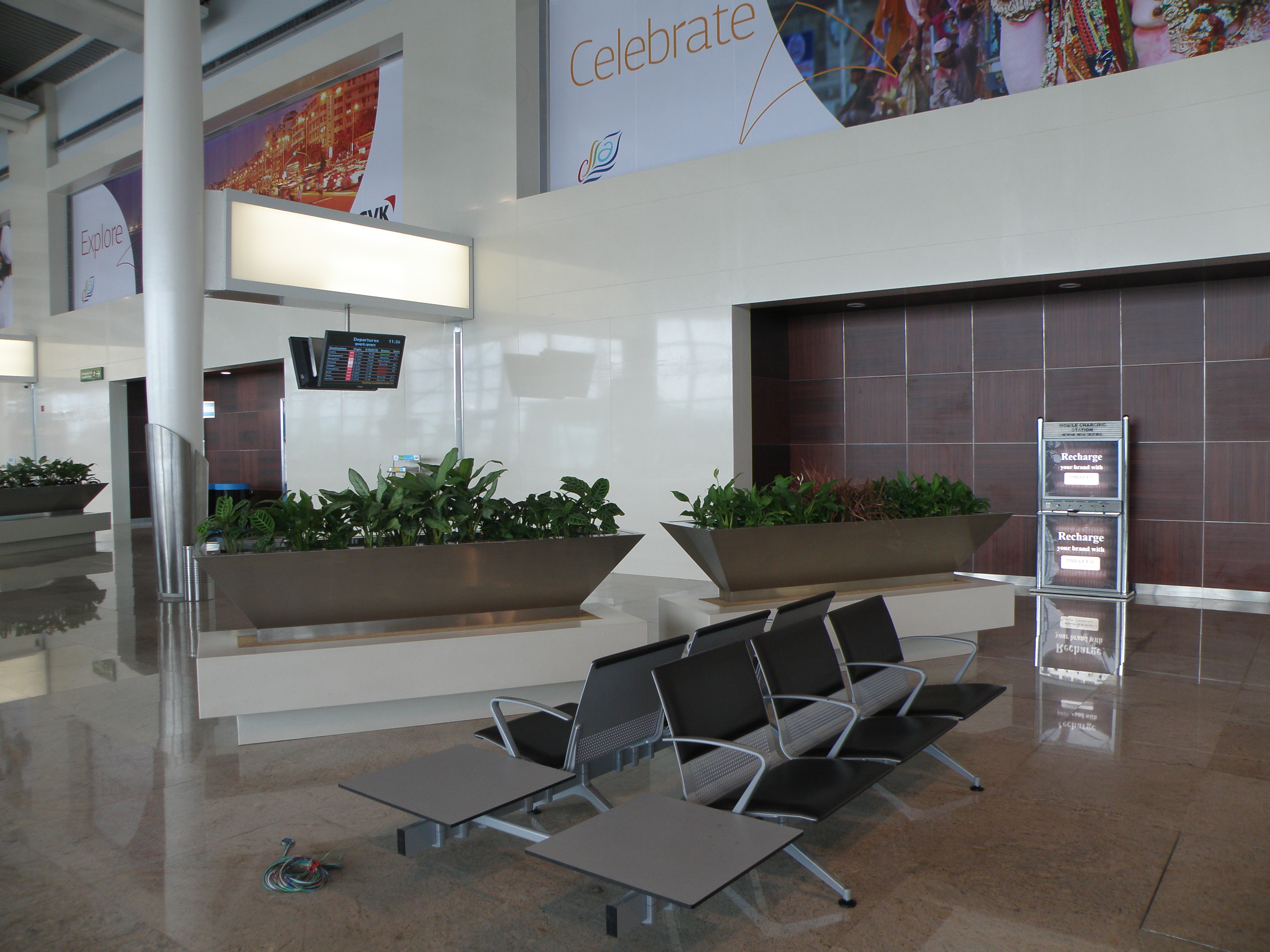
Mumbai airport domestic departure terminal 1C (4)

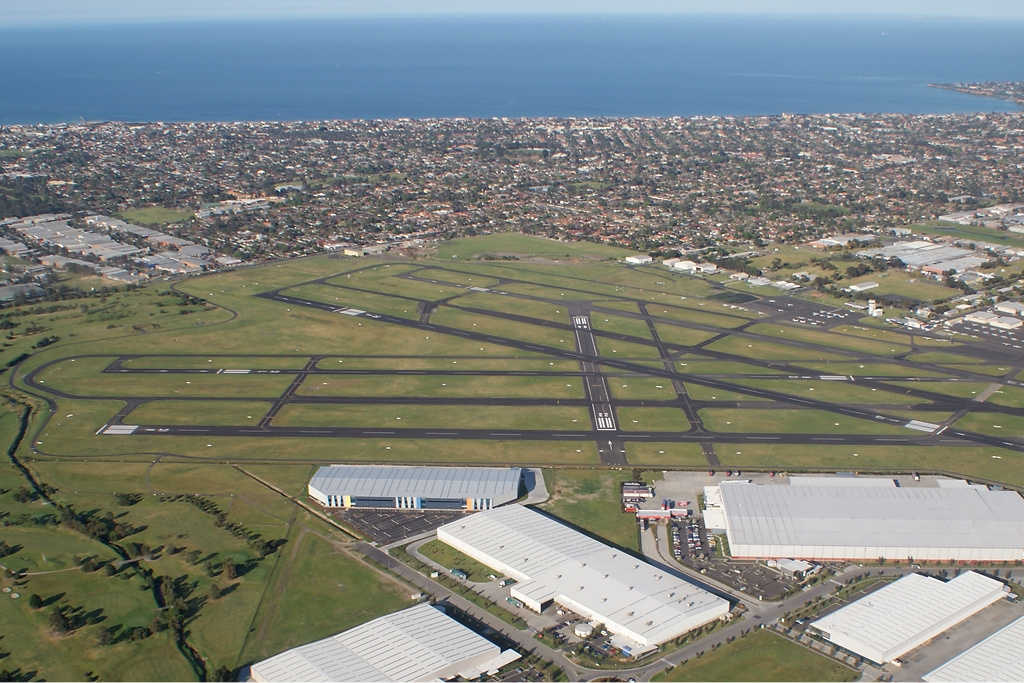
Overview of Moorabbin Airport, Melbourne, Australia

A domestic airport is an airport that handles only flights within the same country. Domestic airports do not have customs and immigration facilities and so cannot handle flights to or from a foreign airport.

These airports often have short runways sufficient to handle short or medium haul aircraft and regional air traffic. Security check/metal detectors are used in most countries, but in many cases they were installed decades after security checks for international flights had become commonplace.

Most municipal airports in Canada and the United States are of this classification. At international airports in Canada, there are domestic terminals that handle flights within Canada (flying from one Canadian city to another).

Additionally, some airports that are named "international" are essentially domestic airports that handles international traffic on an irregular basis. A notable example of this is Osaka International Airport (Itami Airport) in the outskirts of Osaka, Japan. Most of these airports are located in the United States.

In the United Kingdom, an example of a domestic airport is Wick Airport, which operates frequent flights to other Scottish airports.

Some small countries or regions do not have any public domestic airports, or even public domestic flights, due to their size or political reasons, or due to having alternatives to domestic flights such as high-speed rail (e.g. Belgium, Kuwait, Hungary, Lithuania, Luxembourg, Serbia, Singapore, Slovakia, and the United Arab Emirates).

== Regional airport ==
A regional airport is an airport serving traffic within a relatively small or lightly populated geographical area. A regional airport usually does not have customs and immigration facilities to process traffic between countries. In Canada regional airports usually service connections within Canada and some flights to the United States. A few U.S. regional airports, some of which call themselves international airports, may have customs and immigration facilities staffed on an as-needed basis, but the vast majority serve domestic traffic only.

Aircraft using these airports tend to be smaller business jets, private aircraft and regional airliners of both turboprop propelled or regional jetliner varieties. These flights usually go a shorter distance to a larger regional hub. These airports usually have shorter runways, which exclude heavy planes with much fuel.

=== Europe ===
In European countries, regional airports are often classed as airports that do not serve the country's capital/most major city. Examples of larger regional airports include Barcelona–El Prat Airport, Spain and Manchester Airport, England, which are both among Europe's busiest airports and are used by both large and small planes. In countries like France, Germany, and Sweden, a regional airport is an airport for small planes, even though they go to the national hub, just like flights from larger airports. Examples of small regional airports include Coventry Airport and Worship Airport. In northern Norway, a country with long distances and many short-runway airports, regional airports are those with flights to a regional hub, not to the capital.

== See also ==
- Domestic flight
- International airport
- International flight
- Civil enclave
- Fly-in fly-out
