= RAF Freiston =

Former Royal Air Force station in Lincolnshire, England

RAF Freiston
- Freiston, Lincolnshire in England

Site information
- Type: Royal Air Force station
- Owner: Air Ministry
- Operator: Royal Naval Air Service; Royal Air Force

Location
- RAF Freiston in Lincolnshire
- Coordinates: 52°56′37.8″N 0°03′48.8″E

Site history
- Built: 1916
- In use: 1916–1919
- Fate: Closed
- Battles/wars: World War I

Garrison information
- Past commanders: Major Harold Spencer Kerby, RAF

Royal Air Force Freiston or more simply RAF Freiston is a former Royal Air Force station located about five miles (8 km) east of Boston, Lincolnshire, which was in operation during the First World War.

== Station history ==
In mid-1916, the Royal Naval Air Service established RNAS Freiston Shores on the mudflats to the south of Frieston, Lincolnshire, to serve as a bombing and gunnery range for trainee pilots of the RNAS Flying School at Cranwell. As aircraft using the range had to fly for 40 minutes from Cranwell, in September 1916 about 90 acres (36 ha) of farmland nearby were requisitioned to serve as a landing ground. As training continued, the landing ground was enlarged with hangars, accommodation, and a control tower. As well as its training role, it also became home to a flight of Bristol Scouts based there on anti-Zeppelin operations. On 1 April 1918 the Royal Naval Air Service was merged with the Army's Royal Flying Corps to form the Royal Air Force, and it was renamed RAF Freiston, designated the School of Aerial Fighting and Bomb Dropping, and later renamed No. 4 School of Aerial Fighting, and then No. 4 Fighting School, to train pilots in air gunnery and bomb dropping operations. The station was closed in early 1919, and soon after several buildings were destroyed in a severe gale. The only remains still extant are the foundations of the headquarters building.

St. James' church in nearby Freiston village contains nine Commonwealth War Graves, three of whom were Canadians serving with the RAF, who were killed in flying accidents during training at RAF Freiston.

== See also ==
- List of former Royal Air Force stations
