= Harold Spencer Kerby =

Canadian air officer of the Royal Air Force

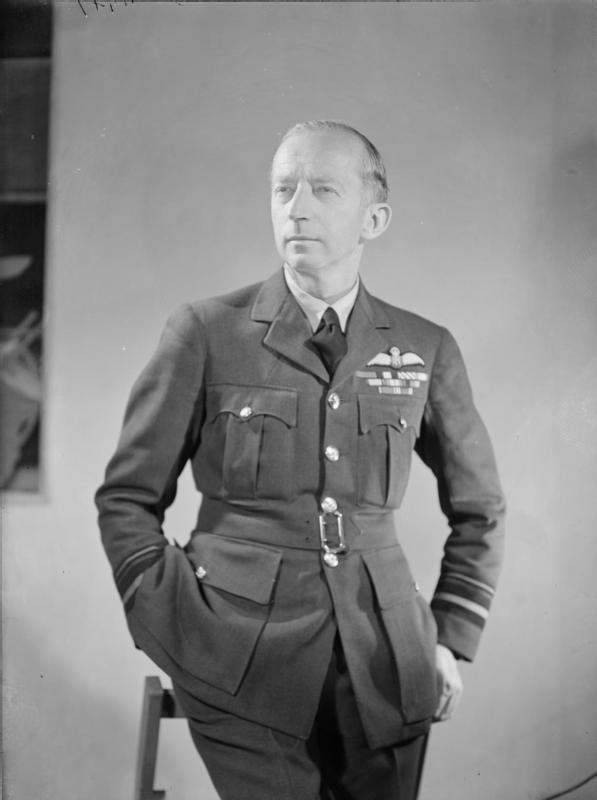
- Air Vice Marshal Kerby, Air Officer Commanding Air Headquarters, East Africa, at the Air Ministry, London
- Born: 14 May 1893; Hamilton, Ontario, Canada
- Died: 8 June 1963 (aged 70); London, England
- Military career
- Allegiance: United Kingdom
- Branch: Royal Navy (1915–18); Royal Air Force (1918–46)
- Service years: 1915–1946
- Rank: Air vice-marshal
- Commands: AHQ East Africa (1943–44); RAF Binbrook (1940); No. 72 Wing, AASF (1939–40); No. 504 (County of Nottingham) Squadron (1934–35); No. 4 Fighter School (1918–19)
- Conflicts: First World War: Gallipoli Campaign; Western Front; Second World War
- Awards: Companion of the Order of the Bath; Distinguished Service Cross; Air Force Cross; Mentioned in dispatches Legion of Merit (United States)

Air Vice Marshal Harold Spencer Kerby, CB, DSC, AFC (14 May 1893 – 8 June 1963) was a Canadian-born air officer of the Royal Air Force. He served in the Royal Naval Air Service during the First World War, where he became a flying ace with nine confirmed aerial victories, later transferring to the Royal Air Force, rising to command of British Air Forces in East Africa during the Second World War.

== Early life and education ==
Kerby was born in Hamilton, Ontario, Canada, the only son of Reverend George William Kerby, and his wife Emily (née Spencer). In 1903 the family moved to Calgary, Alberta, where his father served as minister at the Central Methodist Church, and then as principal of Mount Royal College from 1911. His mother was a teacher, author, feminist, and social activist, who served as first president of the Calgary Young Women's Christian Association, first vice-president of the Calgary Local Council of Women, and who eventually became vice-president of the National Council of Women of Canada. Harold Kerby graduated from the University of Toronto with a degree in mechanical engineering.

== First World War ==
Kerby joined the Royal Naval Air Service in February 1915 as a probationary flight sub-lieutenant, being confirmed in his rank on 21 March. He was granted Royal Aero Club Aviators Certificate No. 1214 after soloing a Grahame-White biplane at the Grahame-White School at Hendon on 5 May. On 12 June Kerby was posted to No. 3 (Naval) Squadron (later No. 3 Wing), under Commander Charles Samson, to serve in the Gallipoli Campaign. He was wounded on 26 November, and after a year recuperating, was reinstated on 27 November 1916. He was then posted to No. 9 (Naval) Squadron in France, where on 24 March 1917 he gained his first aerial victory, flying a Sopwith Pup, sharing in the destruction of an enemy seaplane at Wenduine. Promoted to flight lieutenant on 1 April, he then returned to No. 3 (Naval) Squadron, now also based in France, where he gained six more aerial victories between 22 April and 27 May. In August, while serving in the Walmer Defence Flight, he destroyed two Gotha G.IV heavy bombers.

He was subsequently awarded the Distinguished Service Cross, which was gazetted on 2 November 1917. His citation read:

Flight Lieutenant Harold Spencer Kerby, RNAS. For the great courage and initiative shown by him on many, occasions, notably on the 12th August 1917, when he attacked hostile machines returning from a raid on England. One hostile machine was driven down by him to the water, where it was observed to turn over.

On 31 December he was promoted to flight commander. On 1 April 1918, the Royal Naval Air Service was merged with the Army's Royal Flying Corps to form the Royal Air Force, and Kerby joined the RAF with the rank of lieutenant (temporary captain). On 18 May he was appointed a temporary major, to serve as Officer Commanding and Instructor at No. 4 Fighter School, RAF Freiston.

=== List of aerial victories ===
Combat record
No.	Date/Time	Aircraft/ Serial No.	Opponent	Result	Location	Notes
No. 9 (Naval) Squadron RNAS
1	24 March 1917 @ abt 1100	Sopwith Pup (N6177)	Seaplane	Destroyed	Wenduine	Shared with Flight Sub-Lieutenant Bromford.
No. 3 (Naval) Squadron RNAS
2	22 April 1917 @ 1910	Sopwith Pup (N6160)	Albatros D	Out of control	Cambrai	
3	23 April 1917 @ 1730	Sopwith Pup (N6160)	Albatros D.III	Destroyed	Le Pave	
4	23 April 1917 @ 1730	Sopwith Pup (N6160)	Albatros D.III	Destroyed	Le Pave	
5	6 May 1917 @ 1905	Sopwith Pup (N6465)	Albatros D.III	Out of control	Bourlon Wood	Shared with Flight Sub-Lieutenant Frederick Armstrong.
6	6 May 1917 @ 1905	Sopwith Pup (N6465)	Albatros D.III	Out of control	Lagnicourt	
7	27 May 1917 @ 0745	Sopwith Pup (N6465)	Albatros D.III	Destroyed	Villers	
Walmer Defence Flight
8	12 August 1917 @ abt 2000	Sopwith Pup (N6440)	Gotha G.IV	Destroyed	Off Southend	
9	22 August 1917 @ abt 1045	Sopwith Pup (N6440)	Gotha G.IV	Destroyed	Half a mile off Margate	Shared with Flight Lieutenant G. E. Hervey.

== Inter-war career ==
Kerby was awarded the Air Force Cross in the New Years Honours of 1 January 1919. He was again appointed an acting major on 1 May, and on 1 August was granted a permanent commission in the RAF with the rank of captain (flight lieutenant). He served on the staff of the No. 1 School of Technical Training at RAF Halton from December 1919, until sent to the RAF Staff College at Andover on 3 April 1922.

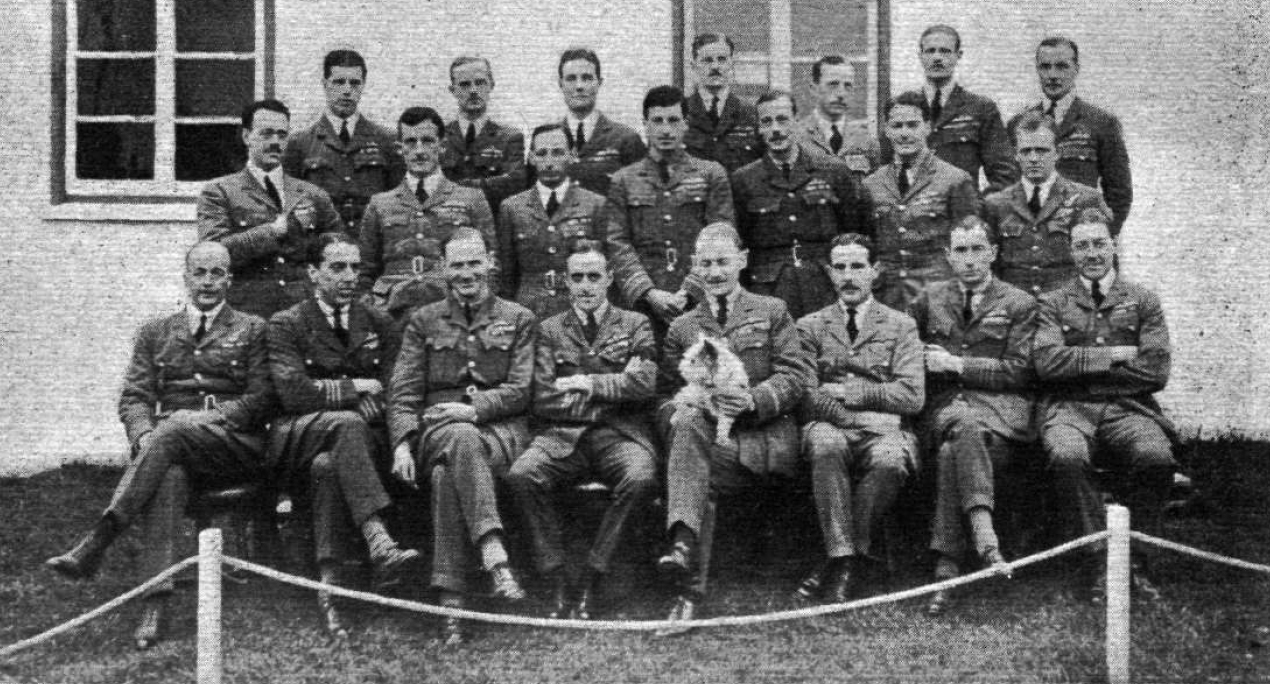
Staff and students at the first RAF Staff College course, 7 December 1922. (Flight Lieutenant Kerby, back row third from right.)

He was one of the first students at the Staff College, which had only just opened under the command of Air Commodore Robert Brooke-Popham. The Directing Staff included Air Commodore Robert Clark-Hall, Group Captain Philip Joubert de la Ferté, Wing Commanders Wilfrid Freeman and Charles Edmonds, and Squadron Leader Bertine Sutton, while Kerby's fellow students included Wing Commanders Jack Baldwin and Richard Peirse, Squadron Leaders Conway Pulford, Keith Park, Wilfred McClaughry and Charles Portal, and Flight Lieutenants Eric Betts and John Cole-Hamilton.

On completion of the Staff College course he was posted to the Air Staff of No. 3 Group on 4 April 1923, then to the staff of No. 3 Wing, India, on 14 September. Kerby was promoted to squadron leader on 10 October 1928, before finally returning to England to be posted to the RAF Depot at Uxbridge on 6 April 1929. On 1 November he was posted to serve on the staff of the Directorate of Operations and Intelligence in the Air Ministry, before finally returning to flying on 4 April 1934 as Officer Commanding No. 504 (County of Nottingham) Squadron, a Special Reserve Squadron of the Auxiliary Air Force operating Westland Wallace bombers from RAF Hucknall. He was promoted to wing commander on 1 July 1935, leaving No. 504 Squadron on 5 August. From 5 October he was a supernumerary officer on the staff of RAF Far East, and from 16 November 1936 served as Air Attaché at the British Embassy in Beijing and Shanghai. On 1 January 1939 Kerby was promoted to group captain, returning to the No. 1 RAF Depot on the 26th.

== Second World War ==
Kerby served as Officer Commanding, No. 72 Wing, in the Advanced Air Striking Force, based in France between the declaration of war in September 1939 and the battle of France in May 1940. He served as Officer Commanding, RAF Binbrook from July 1940, until being appointed Air Officer Administration, on the staff of RAF Northern Ireland on 30 September. On 1 January 1941 he was mentioned in dispatches. He was promoted to the temporary rank of air commodore on 1 March 1941, and then to acting air vice-marshal on 5 March 1943, to serve as Air Officer Commanding, AHQ East Africa. On 2 June 1943 in the King's Birthday Honours he was made a Companion of the Order of the Bath. On 1 December 1943 Kerby was promoted from group captain to air commodore, and also granted the temporary rank of air vice marshal. On 1 December 1944 he was appointed Air Officer Administration of RAF Coastal Command.

== Post-war ==
Kerby retired from the RAF on 28 June 1946, retaining the rank of air vice marshal. On 15 October 1946 he was granted permission to wear the insignia of an Officer of the Legion of Merit conferred by the United States, followed by Commander of the Legion of Merit on 29 July 1947.

He died on 8 June 1963.
