= Koonur =

Kunur or Kunoor
- village
- Location in Telangana, India Kunur or Kunoor (India)
- Coordinates: 17.842792°N 79.482479°E
- Country: India
- State: Telangana
- District: Jangaon district, erstwhile Warangal district
- Established: [Approximately 150-200 years back]

Population ([2018])
  - Total: [5,000−10,000]

Languages
  - Official: Telugu
- Time zone: UTC+5:30 (IST)
- PIN: 506143
- Telephone code: 08720
- Vehicle registration: TG
- Nearest city: Warangal
- Lok Sabha constituency: Warangal
- Vidhan Sabha constituency: Jangaon
- Website: telangana.gov.in

Koonur or Kunoor or Kunur is a village in Jangaon district of Telangana, India. It falls under Zaffergadh mandal.

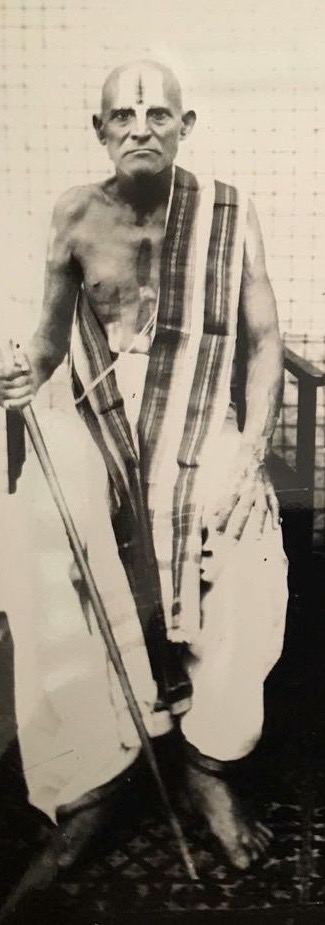
Nellutla Venkateshwara Rao

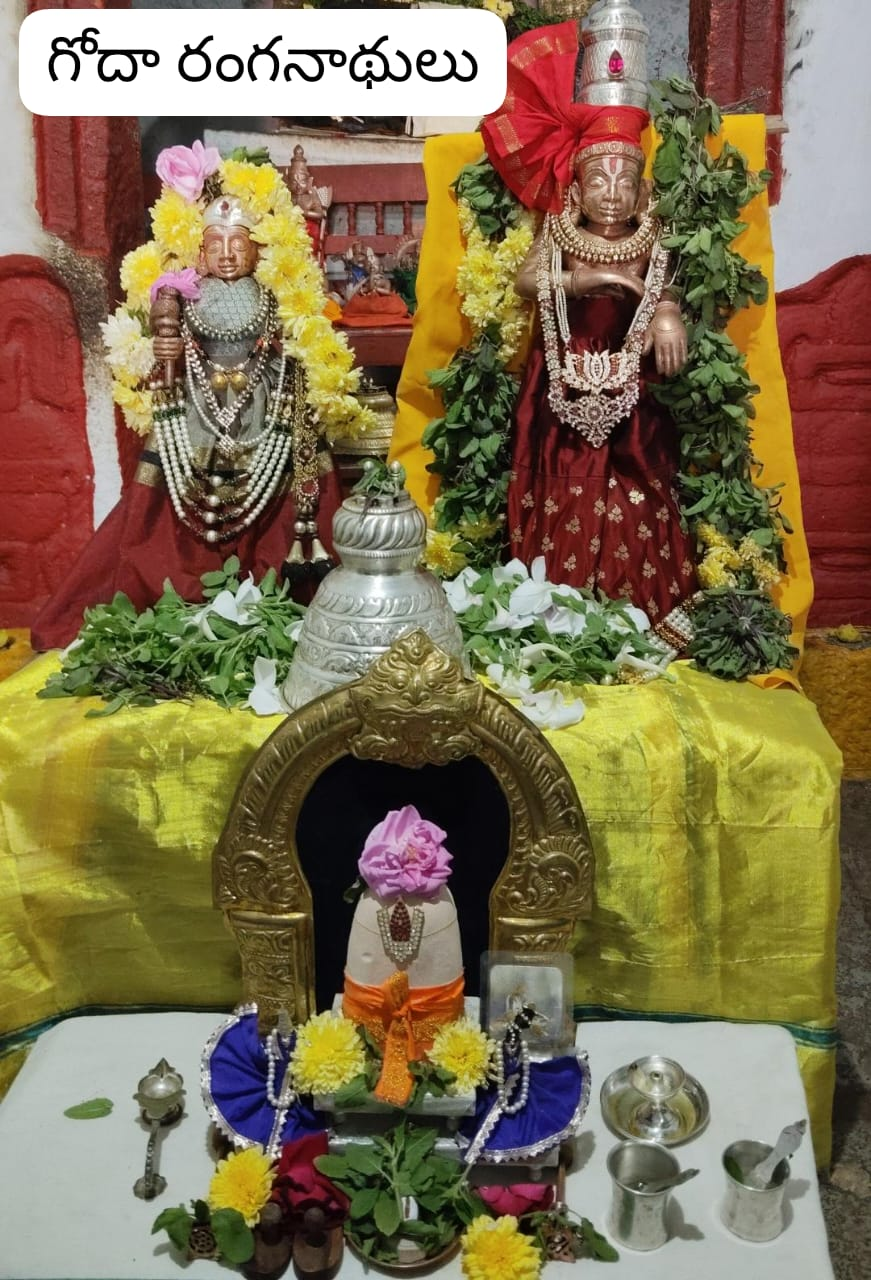
Temple Utasawa Vigrahalu
