= No. 207 Group RAF =

Royal Air Force group

No. 207 (General Purpose) Group RAF
- Royal Air Force Ensign
- Active: 15 December 1941 - 16 November 1942
- Country: United Kingdom
- Branch: Royal Air Force
- Type: Royal Air Force group
- Part of: RAF Middle East Command
- Engagements: World War II

No. 207 (General Purpose) Group was a group of the Royal Air Force (RAF) established on 15 December 1941 by downgrading RAF Air Headquarters East Africa to Group status.

The group was commanded by Air Commodore William Sowrey until June 1942 when Air Commodore Malcolm Taylor took over.

On 16 November 1942, the Group was upgraded to Command status and again became Air HQ East Africa. Following the Casablanca Conference-directed reorganization of the Allied air forces in the North African and Mediterranean Theater of Operations effective 18 February 1943, Air HQ East Africa was a sub-command of RAF Middle East Command, itself a sub-command of the Mediterranean Air Command.

== Group order of battle, 27 October 1942 ==
Source: Richards, D. and H. Saunders, The Royal Air Force 1939-1945 (Volumes 2-3, HMSO, 1953).

| Units | Aircraft |
|---|---|
| 16 Squadron SAAF | Beaufort, Maryland |
| 34 Flight SAAF | Anson |
| 35 Flight SAAF | Blenheim |
| No. 246 Wing RAF 41 Squadron SAAF | Hartebeeste, Hurricane |
| No. 209 Squadron (RAF) | Catalina |
| No. 321 Squadron (RAF) | Catalina |
| No. 1414 Flight (RAF) | Gladiator |
| No. 1433 Flight (RAF) | Lysander |
