= Kunnur =

- Village
- Location in Karnataka, India Kunnur (India)
- Coordinates: 16.42°N 74.58°E
- Country: India
- State: Karnataka
- District: Belgaum
- Talukas: Chikodi

Population (2001)
  - Total: 5,447

Languages
  - Official: Kannada
- Time zone: UTC+5:30 (IST)

Kunnur is a village in the southern state of Karnataka, India. It is located in the Chikodi taluk of Belgaum district in Karnataka.

Geography and Climate- Kunnur is close to western ghats it enjoys a good rainy season. Summer is hot but temperatures do not causes discomfort. Winter is pleasant and enjoyable. Temperature ranges from 16 to 41 °C (61 to 106 °F). Sugarcane and vegetables are the main crops in and around this region.

== Demographics ==
As of 2001 India census, Kunnur had a population of 5447 with 2757 males and 2690 females. Kunnur has a great Traditional Background. Hanuman temple, Vitthal Mandir, Ram Mandir, Datta mandir, Jain Basti, Muslim Masjid, Veerbhadra temple, Bhairavnath Temple are placed in one area which are nearer to each other. Sangameshwar Mandir is also one of the Jagrut Temple which is located outside the village around 3.5 km from the main village. Kunnur is surrounded by two rivers: Dudhganga and Vedganga. The beautiful mahadev temple is located where these two rivers meet. Every year in January or February a big mela (Yatra) is arranged here. Kunnur is well known for its Hanuman temple. The Hanuman committee during Hanuman Jayanti, 11 days cultural programs arranges and people from nearby villages come in large number to take blessings of God Hanuman and enjoys the cultural activities.

== See also ==
- Belgaum
- Districts of Karnataka
