= No. 321 (Netherlands) Squadron RAF =

Defunct flying squadron of the Royal Air Force

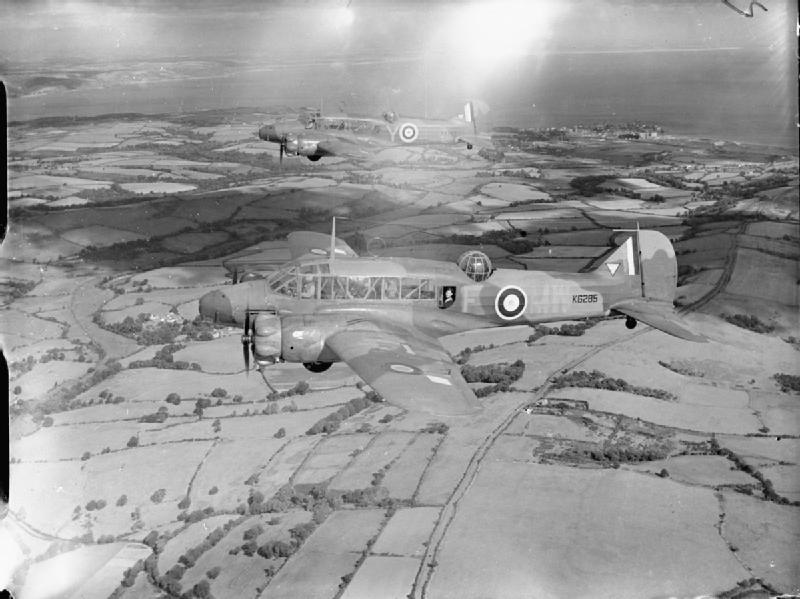
- Avro Anson of No. 321 Squadron, carrying Dutch markings on its tail.
- Active: 1 June 1940 – 18 January 1941; 15 August 1942 – 8 December 1945
- Country: United Kingdom
- Allegiance: (Netherlands) Dutch government in exile
- Branch: Royal Air Force
- Type: Inactive
- Part of: RAF Coastal Command
- Nickname: Netherlands
- Aircraft: Consolidated Catalina, Consolidated Liberator

No. 321 (Netherlands) Squadron RAF was a unit of the Royal Air Force during the Second World War formed from the personnel of the Marineluchtvaartdienst (MLD), the Royal Netherlands Naval Air Service.

== History ==
=== Formation ===
Formed on 1 June 1940 at RAF Pembroke Dock, the squadron moved to RAF Carew Cheriton on 28 July 1940 and became operational. The squadron flew coastal and anti-submarine patrols with Avro Ansons until the squadron was disbanded, due to lack of personnel, and merged with No. 320 (Netherlands) Squadron on 18 January 1941.

=== Catalinas ===
The squadron was re-activated at RAF Trincomalee, Ceylon on 15 August 1942. It was equipped with Consolidated Catalinas, which were crewed by MLD personnel who escaped to Ceylon. The squadron's headquarters was located at RAF China Bay with detachments based in Mombasa, Cocos Islands, Socotra, Masirah, Ceylon, Durban, Port Elizabeth, Aden and Cape Town. Supplemented with Consolidated Liberators in July 1945, the air echelon moved to Cocos Island in preparation for Operation Zipper, the proposed invasion of Malaya.

After the Japanese surrender in 1945, relief flights and supply drops were flown to thousands of internees in the POW camps on Java and Sumatra, and in October the squadron moved to its new base near Batavia, where the squadron passed to MLD control on December 8, keeping the same squadron number, No. 321 Squadron MLD. Along with 320 Squadron, it flew maritime patrol missions from Valkenburg for decades afterwards. The Squadron was disbanded in January 2005 due to budget cuts.

== Aircraft operated ==
From	To	Aircraft	Version
Jun 1940	Jan 1941	Avro Anson	Mk.I
Aug 1942	Dec 1944	Consolidated Catalina	Mk.II
Dec 1943	Aug 1945	Consolidated Catalina	Mk.III
Dec 1944	Dec 1945	Consolidated Liberator	Mk.VI
Aug 1945	Dec 1945	Consolidated Catalina	Mk.Va
Dec 1945	Dec 1945	Consolidated Catalina	Mk.IVb

== Commanding officers ==
From	To	Name
Jun 1940	Aug 1940	Lt/Cdr. H. Kolff
Aug 1940	Oct 1940	Lt/Cdr. M.G. Smalt
Oct 1940	Jan 1941	Lt/Cdr. W. van Lier
Jul 1942	1945	Lt/Cdr. W. van Prooijen
