= Moi Air Base =

Military airport east of Nairobi, Kenya

Moi Air Base ~~RAF Eastleigh~~
- Eastleigh, Nairobi in Kenya

Site information
- Type: Air Base
- Owner: Kenya Defence Forces
- Operator: Kenya Air Force

Location
- Shown within Kenya
- Coordinates: 1°16′37.9″S 036°51′44.3″E

Site history
- Built: 1936
- In use: 1936-present

Airfield information
- Identifiers: ICAO: HKRE
- Elevation: 1,632 metres (5,354 ft) AMSL
Runways
Direction	Length and surface
06/24	2,380 metres (7,808 ft) Asphalt

Moi Air Base, formerly known as RAF Eastleigh and Eastleigh Airport (ICAO: HKRE) is a military airport located to the east of Nairobi, in the Eastleigh suburb. The airport is used by the Kenya Air Force. Additionally, the airfield is the home of the East African School of Aviation run by the Kenya Civil Aviation Authority, which was established at the airport in 1954 as the DCA training school. The airport is also used to train Kenyan Air Cadets.

Due to its military status, the airport is not shown in any official map of Nairobi. Instead, the area is left blank. This does not affect Google Earth, though.

== History ==
RAF Eastleigh was a Royal Air Force airfield in Kenya, in the Eastleigh suburb of Nairobi. (The name "RAF Eastleigh" was also used during 1935 for the airfield in England that became RAF Southampton in 1936.)

A detachment of No. 45 Squadron RAF arrived in December 1929. The detachment was reportedly equipped with Fairey III reconnaissance biplanes. The RAF Unit, Kenya, was established on 14 December 1935. On 15 December 1936, "B" Flight, 45 Squadron, by that time equipped with Fairey Gordon aircraft, was expanded into No. 223 Squadron RAF.

223 Squadron stayed until 17 September 1939. By January 1940 No. 223 Squadron was located at Gordon's Tree, in the south of Khartoum, in the Sudan.

The first RAF elements listed on "Air of Authority" for the originally named RAF Nairobi were:

- RAF Unit, Kenya (14 December 1935 - 6 September 1939)
- SHQ Rhodesian Air Unit (4 - 19 September 1939). By 3 September 1939 the Southern Rhodesia Air Section under Squadron Leader M. Maxwell had arrived at Nairobi in the Kenya Colony. It was initially renamed No. 1 Squadron Southern Rhodesia Air Force, but then became No. 237 Squadron.
- No 2 (Training) Flight, Kenya Auxiliary Air Unit (6 September 1939 - 1 August 1940)
- No. 237 Squadron RAF (22 April - 30 September 1940)

Eastleigh was the primary RAF station for East Africa, and home to Air Headquarters East Africa after force reductions in the 1950s.

No. 1340 Flight RAF arrived at Eastleigh on 27 March 1953, commanded by Squadron Leader Charles G. St. David Jefferies, for anti-Mau Mau rebellion operations. It was equipped with 12 Noorduyn Harvard IIBs, eight operational and four in reserve, with two being serviced any one time.

The aircraft were fitted with bomb racks under the wings to take eight 20 lb (9.1 kg) fragmentation bombs and a single Browning .303 machine gun under the starboard wing, with the ammunition carried inside the wing. Because of the wooded terrain, the Harvards weren't used for two months because General Hinde thought they would be ineffective.

However, because of its high elevation and short runways (which could not be extended because of its location close to the city), from the arrival of No. 208 Squadron RAF in the late 1950s with its Hawker Hunters, jet fighters and bombers had to operate out of nearby Embakasi Airport.

From 1945 to 1958, Eastleigh also operated as Nairobi's main international civilian airport. British Overseas Airways Corporation (BOAC) and East African Airways operated flights from Eastleigh until the opening of Embakasi Airport (now Jomo Kenyatta International) nearby in 1958. Beforehand, the suitability of Eastleigh to post-War commercial airliners became a burning question; it retained a dual military-civilian role while a site was sought for a more modern, bigger civil airport. Funding the new airport became a major hurdle.

During World War 2, it was the location for No. 1414 (Meteorological) Flight RAF equipped with Gloster Gladiator, Boulton Paul Defiant, Hawker Hurricane, Supermarine Spitfire, Percival Proctor and No. 1569 (Meteorological) Flight RAF equipped with Hurricanes. After the war No. 21 Squadron RAF, No. 30 Squadron RAF, No. 82 Squadron RAF (perhaps between 1947 and 1952, carrying out aerial surveying) and a Communications Flight operated from the base.

After Kenyan independence in December 1963, the Kenya Air Force was formed in 1964. After the coup attempt by a group of KAF officers on 1 August 1982, the Kenya Air Force was disbanded and placed under the control of the Kenyan Army. During this period, KAF Eastleigh was renamed "Moi Air Base."
