= 756 Naval Air Squadron =

Inactive flying squadron of the Royal Navy's Fleet Air Arm

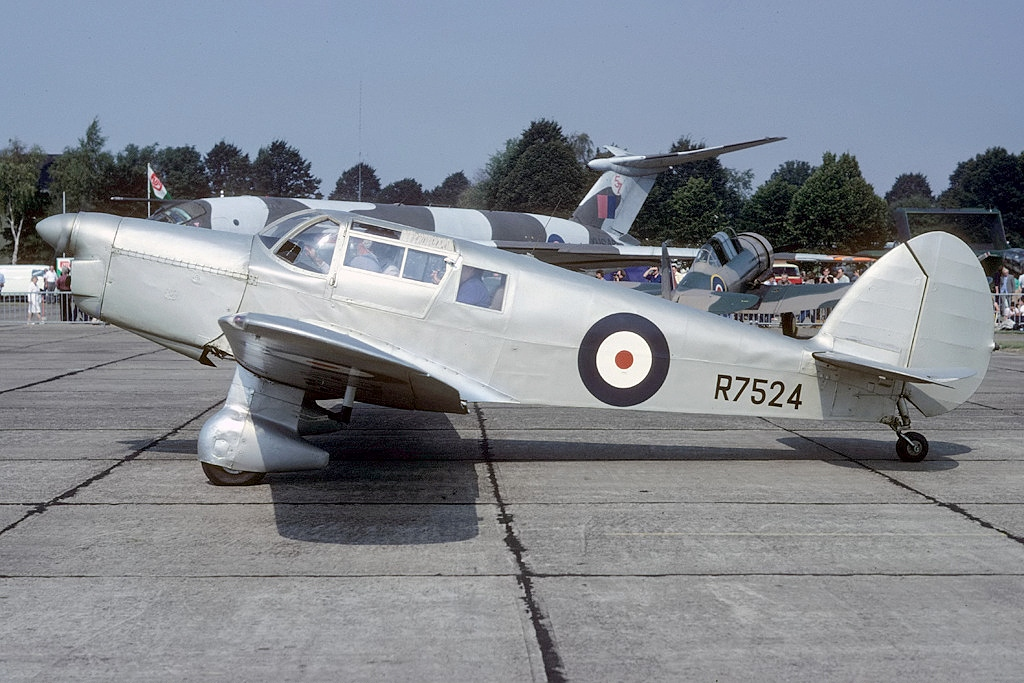
- Percival Proctor, of the type used by 756 NAS
- Active: 1939; 1941–1942; 1943–1945
- Disbanded: 24 November 1945
- Country: United Kingdom
- Branch: Royal Navy
- Type: Fleet Air Arm Second Line Squadron
- Role: Telegraphist Air Gunner Training Squadron; Torpedo Bomber Reconnaissance
- Size: Squadron
- Part of: Fleet Air Arm
- Home station: See Naval air stations section for full list.
- Aircraft: See Aircraft flown section for full list.

Insignia
- Identification Markings: X3A+ (Proctor) single letters (Albacore); KA+ (Barracuda & Swordfish); K1A+ (Avenger)

756 Naval Air Squadron (756 NAS), also known as 756 Squadron, is an inactive Fleet Air Arm (FAA) naval air squadron of the United Kingdom's Royal Navy (RN). It was last operational as a Torpedo, Bomber, Reconnaissance pool, operating with Fairey Swordfish I, Fairey Barracuda Mk II and Mk III and Grumman Avenger GR.I and Mk.II aircraft.

It was initially formed as a Telegraphist Air Gunner Training Squadron, operating from May to August 1939, out of RNAS Worthy Down (HMS Kestrel), in Hampshire, England. It was later reformed again as a Telegraphist Air Gunner Training Squadron, operating from March 1941, out of RNAS Worthy Down (HMS Kestrel). TAG training was provided until the No. 2 School was ready in Canada, opening on 1 January 1943, and 756 Naval Air Squadron disbanded in December 1942. The squadron reformed at RNAS Katukurunda (HMS Ukussa), in Ceylon, in October 1943. During 1944 and 1945, the squadron undertook a number of detachments on different types of Royal Navy aircraft carriers, then disbanded in December 1945.

== History ==
756 Naval Air Squadron initially formed at RNAS Worthy Down (HMS Kestrel), 3.5 miles (6 km) north of Winchester, Hampshire, England, on 24 May 1939, as a Telegraphist Air Gunner Training Squadron. It was equipped with a number of Blackburn Shark Mk III, a carrier-borne torpedo bomber, used in the torpedo-spotter-reconnaissance role. However the squadron disbanded on 15 August 1939, and it was absorbed into 755 Naval Air Squadron.

=== Telegraphist Air Gunner Training Squadron (1941-1942) ===
756 Naval Air Squadron reformed at RNAS Worthy Down (HMS Kestrel), on 6 March 1941, as a Telegraphist Air Gunner Training Squadron. It operated with Percival Proctor I and II, a British radio trainer and communications aircraft.

The squadron continued Telegraphist Air Gunner training throughout 1942, however, as part of the British Commonwealth Air Training Plan, the No. 2 Telegraphist Air Gunner School, at RN Air Section Yarmouth, located in Yarmouth County, Nova Scotia, Canada, opened on 1 January 1943, and therefore 756 Naval Air Squadron disbanded at RNAS Worthy Down on 1 December 1942.

=== Torpedo Bomber Reconnaissance (1943-1945) ===
756 Naval Air Squadron reformed on 1 October 1943 as a Torpedo Bomber Reconnaissance pool at RNAS Katukurunda (HMS Ukussa), located near the town of Kalutara in Sri Lanka. The squadron initially used Fairey Albacore, a single-engine biplane torpedo bomber, and Fairey Fulmar, a British carrier-borne reconnaissance aircraft/fighter aircraft, from reformation. These were followed by Fairey Barracuda, a British carrier-borne torpedo and dive bomber, in the December. In February 1944, Fairey Albacore and Fairey Fulmar aircraft were both withdrawn from the squadron's inventory, but Fairey Swordfish, a biplane torpedo bomber aircraft arrived in March and these were closely followed by Grumman Avenger, an American torpedo bomber aircraft, in May.

The squadron participated in four separate aircraft carrier deployments, two during 1944 and another two in 1945. From the 29 April to the 4 May 1944, a detachment from 756 Naval Air Squadron, was deployed on the aircraft repair ship and light aircraft carrier, HMS Unicorn. Next the squadron sent a detachment to the Illustrious-class aircraft carrier, HMS Victorious for approximately two weeks, from 29 October to 12 November.

In 1945, a detachment then spent three days, 1, 2 and 3 May, operating from the Attacker-class escort carrier, HMS Attacker and this was later followed by a two-week detachment to the Ruler-class escort carrier, HMS Atheling, between 15 and 21 August.

On 24 November 1945, 756 Naval Air Squadron disbanded at RNAS Katukurunda.

== Aircraft flown ==
756 Naval Air Squadron has operated a number of different aircraft types, including:

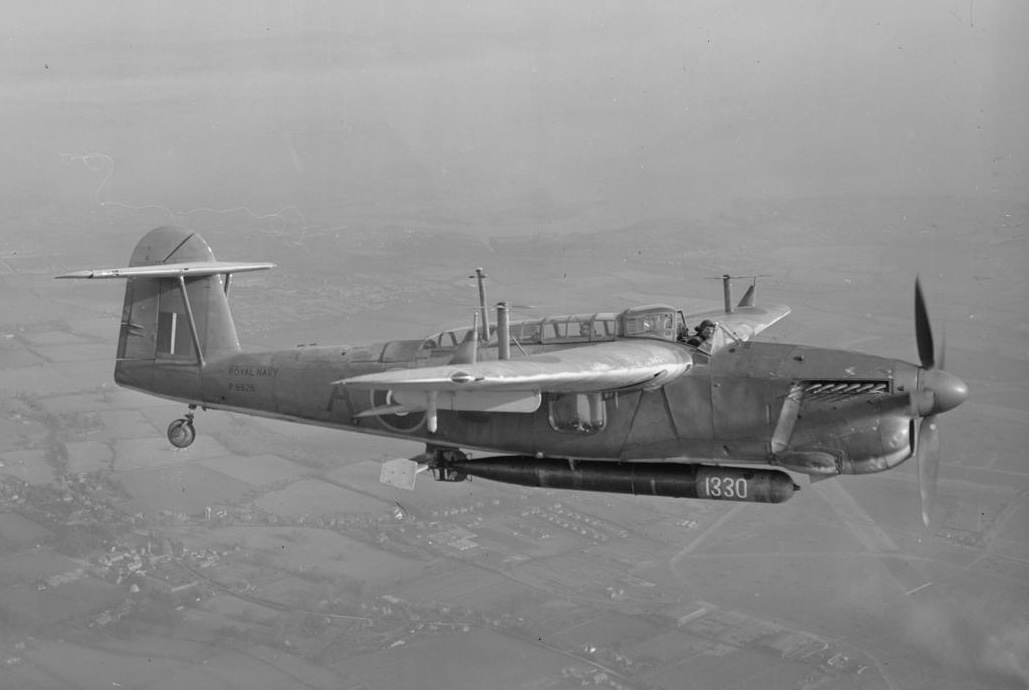
Fairey Barracuda Mk II

- Percival Proctor IA deck landing and radio trainer aircraft (March 1941 - December 1942)
- Percival Proctor IIA radio trainer aircraft (March 1941 - December 1942)
- de Havilland Tiger Moth II trainer aircraft (December 1941 - June 1942)
- Fairey Albacore Mk I torpedo bomber (October 1943 - February 1944)
- Fairey Fulmar Mk.II reconnaissance/fighter aircraft (October 1943 - February 1944)
- Fairey Barracuda Mk II torpedo and dive bomber (December 1943 - November 1945)
- Fairey Barracuda Mk III torpedo and dive bomber (December 1943 - November 1945)
- Fairey Swordfish I torpedo bomber (March 1944 - February 1945)
- Grumman Tarpon GR.I torpedo bomber (May 1944 - November 1945)
- Grumman Avenger Mk.II torpedo bomber (May 1944 - November 1945)

== Naval air stations and aircraft carriers ==
756 Naval Air Squadron operated from a few naval air stations of the Royal Navy, one in England and two overseas in Sri Lanka, and some deployments in Royal Navy Fleet and Escort aircraft carriers for Deck Landing Training (DLT):

1939

- Royal Naval Air Station Worthy Down (HMS Kestrel), Hampshire, (24 May 1939 - 15 August 1939)
- disbanded - (15 August 1939)

1941 - 1942

- Royal Naval Air Station Worthy Down (HMS Kestrel), Hampshire, (6 March 1941 - 1 December 1942)
- disbanded - (1 December 1942)

1943 - 1945

- Royal Naval Air Station Katukurunda (HMS Ukussa), Ceylon, (1 October 1943 - 24 November 1945)
  - Royal Naval Air Station Colombo Racecourse (HMS Bherunda), Ceylon, (Detachment March 1944 - June 1945)
  - HMS Unicorn (Deck Landing Training 21 April - 4 May 1944)
  - HMS Victorious (Deck Landing Training 29 October - 12 November 1944)
  - HMS Attacker (Deck Landing Training 1–3 May 1945)
  - HMS Atheling (Deck Landing Training 15–21 August 1945)
- disbanded - (24 November 1945)

== Commanding officers ==
List of commanding officers of 756 Naval Air Squadron with date of appointment:

1939

- not identified - (May - August 1939)

1941 - 1942

- Lieutenant Commander(A) R.H. Ovey, RNVR, from 6 March 1941
- Lieutenant Commander(A) W.H.C. Blake, RNVR, from 18 June 1942
- disbanded - 1 December 1942

1943 - 1945

- Lieutenant Commander A.D. Bourke, RNZNVR, from 1 October 1943
- Lieutenant(A) W.D. Widdows, RNVR, from 1 February 1944) (temp)
- Lieutenant Commander(A) S.M. deL. Longsden, RN, from 27 February 1944
- Lieutenant Commander(A) T.T. Miller, RN, from 28 October 1944
- Lieutenant Commander(A) R.E.F. Kerrison, RNVR, from 7 July 1945
- Lieutenant Commander(A) F.W. Barring, RNVR, from 12 August 1945
- disbanded - 24 November 1945

Note: Abbreviation (A) signifies Air Branch of the RN or RNVR.
