= 757 Naval Air Squadron =

Inactive flying squadron of the Royal Navy's Fleet Air Arm

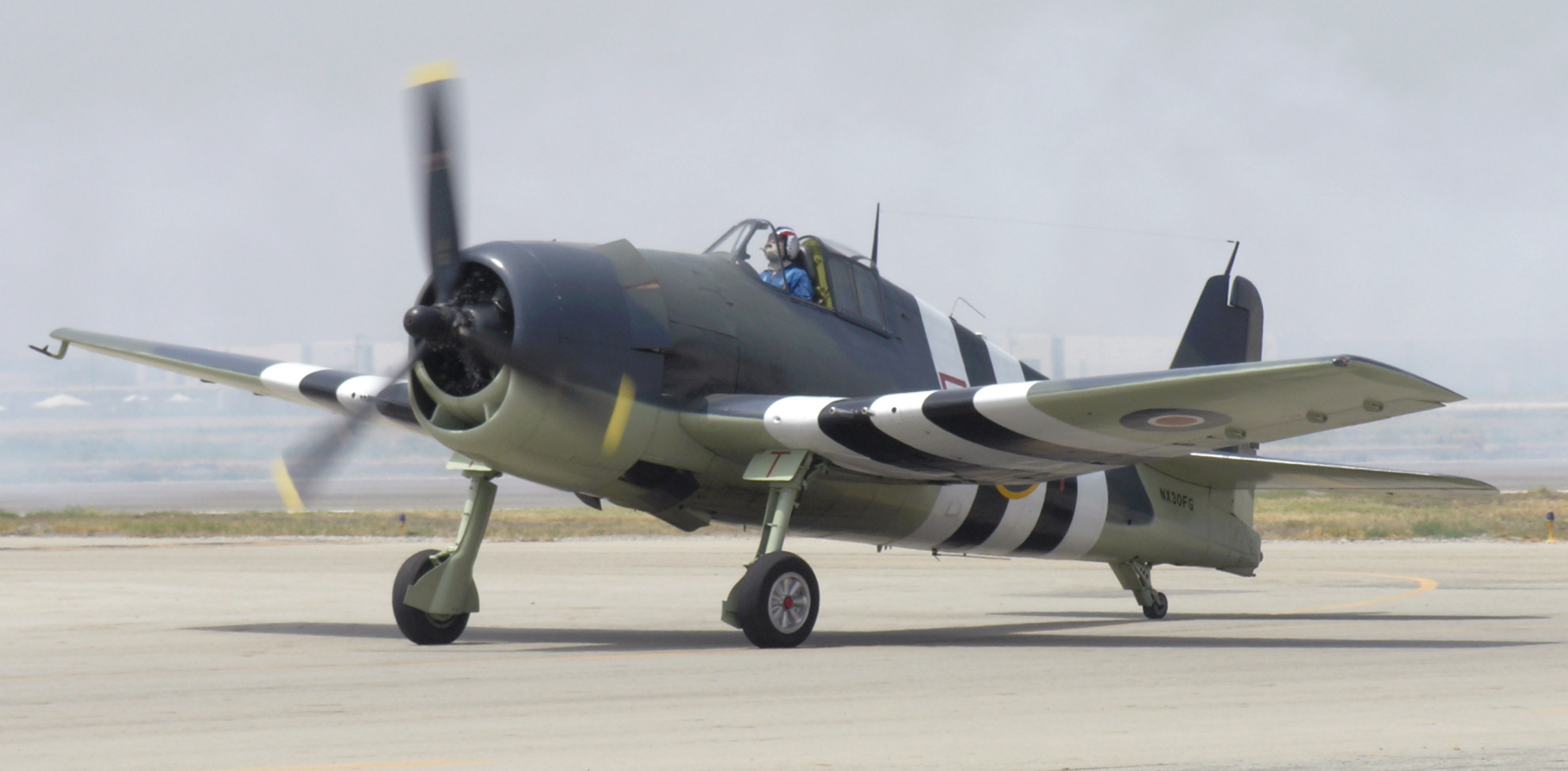
- Grumman Hellcat; an example of the type used by 757 Squadron
- Active: 1939; 1941–1942; 1943–1946
- Disbanded: 29 January 1946
- Country: United Kingdom
- Branch: Royal Navy
- Type: Fleet Air Arm Second Line Squadron
- Role: Telegraphist Air Gunner Training Squadron; Fighter Pool Squadron; Operational Training Unit
- Size: Squadron
- Part of: Fleet Air Arm
- Home station: See Naval air stations section for full list.
- Aircraft: See Aircraft operated section for full list.

Insignia
- Identification symbol: X6A+ 1930 - 1942; P1-P87+ (at RNAS Puttalam); T1-T93+ (at RNAS Tambaran); K1+ (RNAS at Katukurunda)

757 Naval Air Squadron (757 NAS), also called 757 Squadron, is an inactive Fleet Air Arm (FAA) naval air squadron of the United Kingdom’s Royal Navy (RN). It was last active as a Fighter Pool Squadron & Operational Training Unit at RNAS Puttalam (HMS Rajaliya), in Ceylon, in 1943. It operated with Vought Corsair Mk II, Mk III & Mk III fighter bomber, North American Harvard IIA & IIB advanced trainer aircraft, Grumman Wildcat Mk V & Mk VI fighter aircraft, Supermarine Seafire L Mk IIc & F Mk III fighter aircraft and Grumman Hellcat F. Mk. I & F. Mk. II fighter aircraft. After a brief spell at RNAMY Tambaram (HMS Valluru), in India, the squadron finally disbanded at RNAS Katukurunda (HMS Ukussa), in Ceylon, at the beginning of 1946.

It was first formed as a Telegraphist Air Gunner Training Squadron in 1939, operating out of RNAS Worthy Down (HMS Kestrel), Hampshire, but after three months it went into abeyance, only to reform again in the same role, at the same location, in 1941 and operating until 1942, with Hawker Osprey, Blackburn Shark Mk II, Hawker Nimrod II, Blackburn Skua Mk.II and Westland Lysander Mk.III

== History ==
=== Telegraphist Air Gunner Training Squadron (1939) ===
757 Naval Air Squadron formed at RNAS Worthy Down (HMS Kestrel), 3.5 miles (6 km) north of Winchester, Hampshire, on 24 May 1939, as a Telegraphist Air Gunner Training Squadron. It was initially equipped with Hawker Osprey, a British two-seater biplane light bomber aircraft, used in the fighter and reconnaissance role by the Royal Navy and Blackburn Shark II, a carrier-borne biplane torpedo bomber aircraft, however, the squadron went into abeyance on the 15 August 1939.

=== Telegraphist Air Gunner Training Squadron (1941-1942) ===
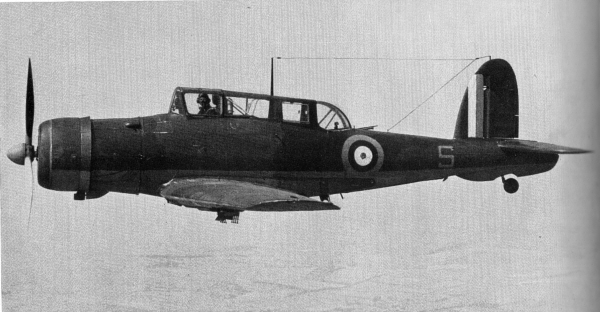
Blackburn Skua, an example of the type used by 757 NAS

757 Naval Air Squadron reformed at RNAS Worthy Down (HMS Kestrel), on 6 March 1941, again as a Telegraphist Air Gunner Training Squadron. From March the squadron was equipped with Hawker Nimrod II, a British carrier-based single-engine, single-seat biplane fighter aircraft, and Blackburn Skua Mk II, a carrier-based dive bomber and fighter aircraft, however, from May 1941, it flew only Blackburn Skua. In April 1942, it replaced these with Westland Lysander III, a British army co-operation and liaison aircraft and continued to operate with these until disbanding at RNAS Worthy Down on 1 December 1942.

=== Fighter Pool Squadron & Operational Training Unit (1943-1946) ===
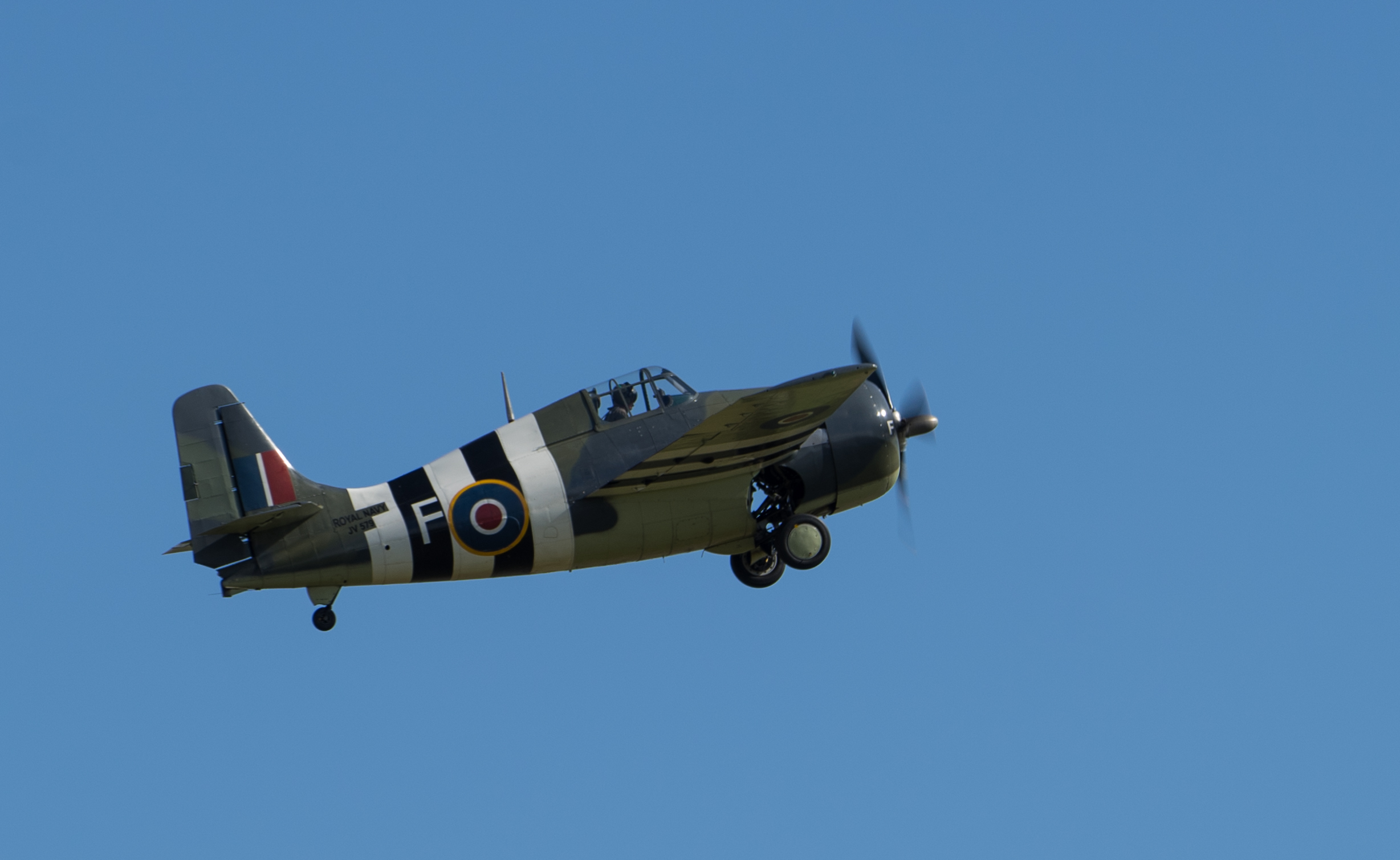
Grumman Wildcat FM-2, Mk VI, in FAA markings, an example of the type operated by 757 NAS

757 Naval Air Squadron reformed at RNAS Puttalam (HMS Rajaliya), in Sri Lanka, as a Fighter Pool Squadron & Operational Training Unit, on 20 October 1943. It was equipped with various marks of Vought Corsair, an American fighter aircraft, Grumman Hellcat, an American carrier-based fighter aircraft, Grumman Wildcat, an American carrier-based fighter aircraft, and Supermarine Seafire, a naval version of the Supermarine Spitfire adapted for operation from an aircraft carrier.

The squadron provided pilots with Deck Landing Training, with aircraft carrier deck landing training carried out on a number of Royal Navy escort carriers. On 5 and 6 November 1944, HMS Battler, an Attacker-class escort carrier, supported 757 Naval Air Squadron deck landing training. The following April, in 1945, between 14 and 20, another Attacker-class escort carrier, HMS Stalker, was the supporting carrier and this was followed by HMS Hunter, also an Attacker-class escort carrier, over 29 and 30 June. From the 9 to 14 July 1945, HMS Begum, a Ruler-class escort carrier, was next to support the carrier deck landing training.

On 15 July 1945, 757 Naval Air Squadron moved to RNAS/RNAMY Tambaram (HMS Valluru), in Chennai, Tamil Nadu, India. The squadron remained at Tambaram for the next four months, before moving to RNAS Katukurunda (HMS Ukussa), located near the town of Kalutara in Sri Lanka, on 12 November 1945. On 29 January 1946, 757 Naval Air Station disbanded at RNAS Katukurunda.

== Aircraft operated ==
757 Naval Air Squadron has operated a number of different aircraft types, including:

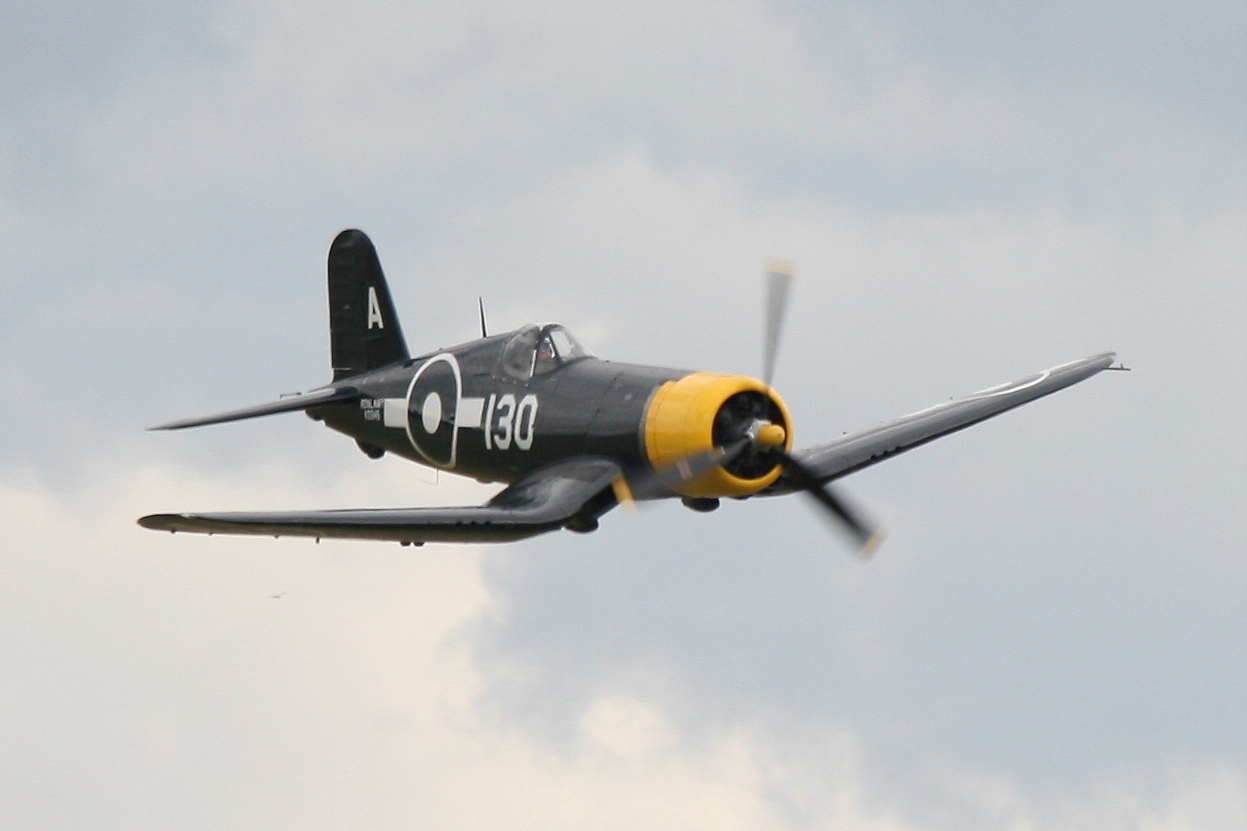
Vought Corsair Mk IV

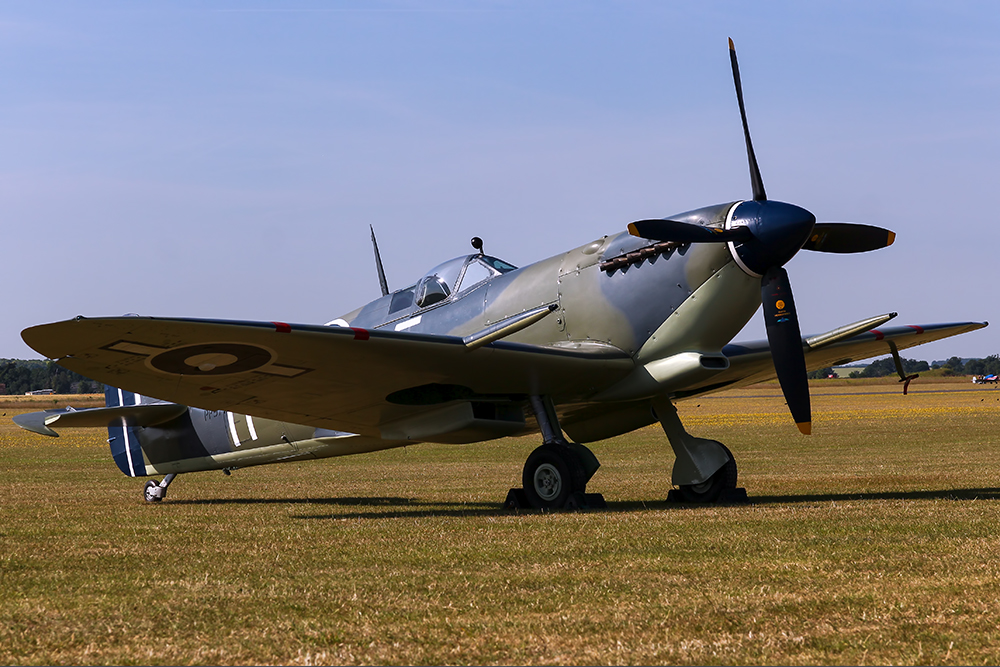
Supermarine Seafire F Mk III

- Hawker Osprey fighter and reconnaissance aircraft (May 1939 - August 1939)
- Blackburn Shark Mk II torpedo bomber (May 1939 - August 1939)
- Hawker Nimrod II fighter aircraft (March 1941 - May 1941)
- Blackburn Skua Mk.II dive bomber and fighter aircraft (March 1941 - April 1942)
- Westland Lysander Mk.III army co-operation and liaison aircraft (April 1942 - December 1942)
- Vought Corsair Mk II fighter bomber (December 1943 - January 1946)
- Vought Corsair Mk III fighter bomber (December 1943 - January 1946)
- Vought Corsair Mk IV fighter bomber (December 1943 - January 1946)
- North American Harvard IIA advanced trainer aircraft (October 1943 - January 1946)
- North American Harvard IIB advanced trainer aircraft (October 1943 - January 1946)
- Grumman Wildcat fighter aircraft Mk V (April 1944 - May 1945)
- Grumman Wildcat Mk VI fighter aircraft (April 1944 - May 1945)
- Supermarine Seafire L Mk IIc fighter aircraft (June 1944 - January 1946)
- Supermarine Seafire F Mk III fighter aircraft (June 1944 - January 1946)
- Grumman Hellcat F. Mk. I fighter aircraft (July 1944 - January 1946)
- Grumman Hellcat F. Mk. II fighter aircraft (July 1944 - January 1946)

== Naval air stations and aircraft carriers ==
757 Naval Air Squadron operated from a number of naval air stations of the Royal Navy in England and overseas in Sri Lanka and India, and some deployments in Royal Navy Escort aircraft carriers for Deck Landing Training (DLT):

1939

- Royal Naval Air Station Worthy Down (HMS Kestrel), Hampshire, (24 May 1939 - 15 August 1939)
- disbanded - (15 August 1939)

1941 - 1942

- Royal Naval Air Station Worthy Down (HMS Kestrel), Hampshire, (6 March 1941 - 1 December 1942)
- disbanded - (1 December 1942)

1943 - 1946

- Royal Naval Air Station Puttalam (HMS Rajaliya), Ceylon, (20 October 1943 - 15 July 1945)
  - HMS Battler (Deck Landing Training 5 - 6 November 1944)
  - HMS Stalker (Deck Landing Training 14 - 20 April 1945)
  - HMS Hunter (Deck Landing Training 29 - 30 June 1945)
  - HMS Begum (Deck Landing Training 9 - 14 July 1945)
  - HMS Atheling (Deck Landing Training 15 - 21 August 1945)
  - HMS Begum (Deck Landing Training 19 - 25 August 1945)
  - HMS Begum (Deck Landing Training 8 November 1945)
- Royal Naval Air Station Tambaram (HMS Valluru), India, (15 July 1945 - 12 November 1945)
- Royal Naval Air Station Katukurunda (HMS Ukussa), Ceylon, (12 November 1945 - 29 January 1946)
- disbanded - (29 January 1946)

== Commanding officers ==
List of commanding officers of 757 Naval Air Squadron with date of appointment:

1939

- Lieutenant Commander V.J. Somerset-Thomas, RN, from 24 May 1939
- disbanded - 15 August 1939

1941 - 1942

- Lieutenant Commander(A) C.R. Hodgson, RNVR, from 6 March 1941
- Lieutenant Commander(A) J.J. Dykes, RNVR, 1 July 1942
- disbanded - 1 December 1942

1943 - 1946

- Lieutenant Commander(A) G.W. Parrish, DSC, RNVR, from 2 October 1943
- Lieutenant Commander(A) R.W. Durrant, DSC, RNZNVR, from 18 June 1945
- Lieutenant(A) J.C.S. Wright, RN, from 1 August 1945
- Lieutenant Commander(A) F. W. Baring, RNVR, from 24 November 1945
- disbanded - 29 January 1946

Note: Abbreviation (A) signifies Air Branch of the RN or RNVR.
