= KTY =

KTY may refer to:

- IATA airport code for Katukurunda Airport, Sri Lanka
- Phoenician script term for Kition, a Phoenician and Ancient Greek city-kingdom
