= Lancaster Prison =

Lancaster Prison may refer to:

- Lancaster Castle, a former Category C men's prison in Lancaster, Lancashire, England
- Lancaster County Prison, a county prison in Lancaster, Pennsylvania, in the United States
- Lancaster Farms (HM Prison), a juvenile prison in Lancaster, Lancashire, England
