= NYAS =

NYAS may stand for:

- The New York Academy of Sciences
- National Youth Advocacy Service, a UK charity providing socio-legal services
- New York Auto Show
