= Black Combe Parkrun =

- Date: Every Saturday, 9 am
- Location: HMP Haverigg
- Event type: Multi-terrain
- Distance: 5 kilometres (3.1 miles)
- Established: 4 November 2017; 9 years ago
- Website: www.parkrun.org.uk/blackcombe

Black Combe parkrun is a parkrun that takes place every Saturday morning at 9 am inside HMP Haverigg, Cumbria, England. The event was the first Parkrun to take place within the grounds of a prison.

== The course ==
The course is named after the Black Combe hill which can be seen from the course. The course takes place within the closed grounds of the prison and is five and a half laps of the prison's grounds. The course is not readily accessible to the public but participation can be granted with special permission.

== The prison ==
HM Prison Haverigg is a Category D men's open prison, located in the village of Haverigg, near Millom in Cumbria, England. Haverigg Prison is operated by His Majesty's Prison Service, and is part of the HMP North Lancashire and Cumbria Estate (along with HMP Lancaster Castle and HMP Lancaster Farms). Haverigg Prison is built on the site of an old RAF airfield training centre, and was opened in 1967. While some of the prison's workshops and offices are housed in buildings from that era, most of HMP Haverigg has been extensively modernised over the years.

== Effect on rehabilitation ==
Parkrun’s head of health and wellbeing, Chrissie Wellington, said "although there is no one silver bullet that can be deployed in the battle to prevent offending and re-offending behaviour, we feel that parkrun can be a unifying force for good in the desistance from crime and changing lives for the better."

Rosie Meek, author of Sport in Prison, said "Prisons are extraordinary, often violent and grim places, and for many the opportunity to visit the prison gym, take part in sport and generally let off some steam is a critical aspect of coping with incarceration."

HMP Haverigg’s medical facility has become an official "parkrun practice" whereby the medical staff can prescribe physical activity rather than a traditional prescription and refer patients to the Parkrun organising team.
