= 776 Naval Air Squadron =

Inactive flying squadron of the Royal Navy's Fleet Air Arm

- Squadron badge
- Active: 1941–1945
- Disbanded: 30 October 1945
- Country: United Kingdom
- Branch: Royal Navy
- Type: Fleet Air Arm Second Line Squadron
- Role: Fleet Requirements Unit
- Size: Squadron
- Part of: Fleet Air Arm
- Home station: See Naval air stations section for full list.
- Aircraft: See Aircraft operated section for full list.

Insignia
- Squadron Badge Description: Per fess wavy gold and black, a cormorant statant wings addorsed proper collared to a line reflexed over the back red and attached to a drogue also red (1944)
- Identification Markings: single letters initially V9A+ (Woodvale detachment); R7A+ & R8A+ (1942)

776 Naval Air Squadron (776 NAS) was a Fleet Air Arm (FAA) naval air squadron of the United Kingdom’s Royal Navy (RN) which last disbanded at the end of October 1945. 776 Naval Air Squadron formed as a Fleet Requirements Unit at HMS Daedalus, RNAS Lee-on-Solent, at the start of 1941. It operated a detachment at RN Air Section Speke in 1941 and one at RAF Woodvale in 1942, with the squadron wholly moving to Speke in the October. 1943 saw further detachments and these were deployed at RAF Llanbedr, RAF Millom, RAF Usworth and RAF Waltham. In April 1945, the Woodvale detachment was reabsorbed into the squadron when it relocated there, the airbase now operated by the Admiralty and known as HMS Ringtail II. It moved to HMS Ringtail, RNAS, Burscough, at the start of October 1945.

== History ==
=== Fleet Requirements Units (1941–1945) ===
776 Naval Air Squadron formed at RNAS Lee-on-Solent (HMS Daedalus), Hampshire, England, on 1 January 1941, as a Fleet Requirements Unit. It initially operated with three Bristol Blenheim, a twin-engine light bomber, and several Blackburn Roc, a naval turret fighter aircraft, some of which of the latter were detached to RN Air Section Speke, Liverpool, England, on 22 March 1941, while a second detachment went to RAF Woodvale, Merseyside, England, on 16 May 1942. During 1942 the squadron received Blackburn Skua, a carrier-based dive bomber and fighter aircraft that was converted for target towing, and Vought Chesapeake an American carrier-based dive bomber, and on 18 October the squadron relocated to RN Air Section Speke.

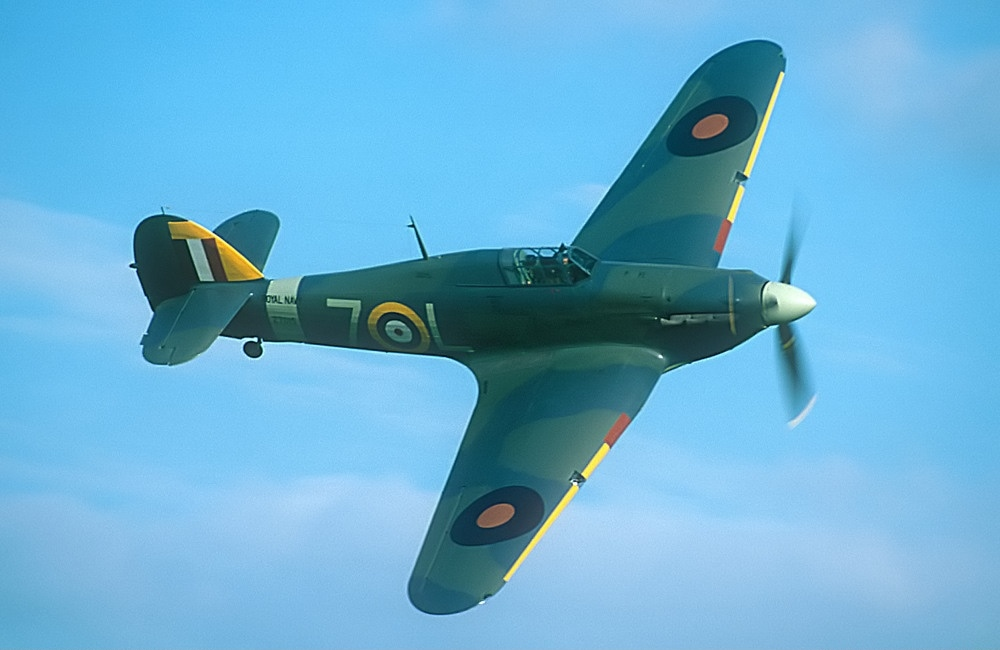
Hawker Sea Hurricane Mk IB

The following year, detachments were deployed at RAF Llanbedr, Gwynedd, Wales, RAF Millom, Cumbria, England, RAF Usworth, Tyne and Wear, England, and RAF Waltham, Lincolnshire, England. The personal de Havilland Dominie, a short-haul biplane airliner, of the Commander-in-Chief, Western Approaches, was also on strength at Speke. In early 1944, 776 NAS received a number of new aircraft had a strength of fourteen Hawker Hurricane fighter aircraft, twelve Boulton Paul Defiant target tug, eight Bristol Blenheim light bomber and a Fairey Swordfish torpedo bomber.

By March 1945 the squadron provided target towing for the Night Fighter Operational School at RNAS Inskip (HMS Nightjar) and the Naval Gunnery Training School at Ainsdale and the Boulton Paul Defiant target tug aircraft were replaced by Miles Martinet target tugs. On 7 April 1945 the squadron moved to RNAS Woodvale (HMS Ringtail II), what was previously RAF Woodvale, and reabsorbed the detachment there. The following month ten Supermarine Seafire arrived, a navalised version of the Supermarine Spitfire fighter aircraft. The squadron moved to RNAS Burscough (HMS Ringtail), Lancashire, on 6 October and disbanded on 30th.

== Aircraft operated ==
The squadron operated a number of different aircraft types, including:

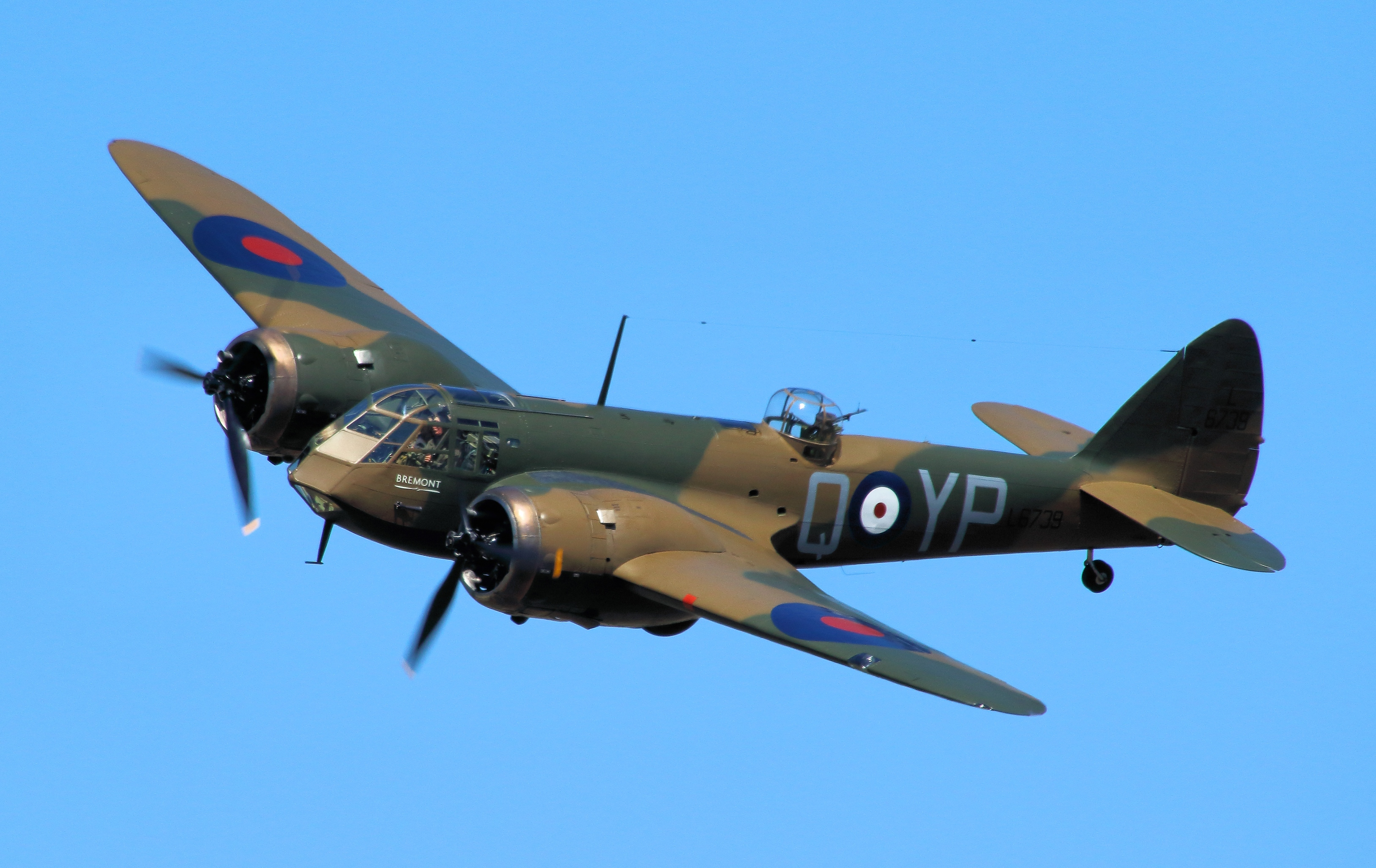
Bristol Blenheim Mk.I

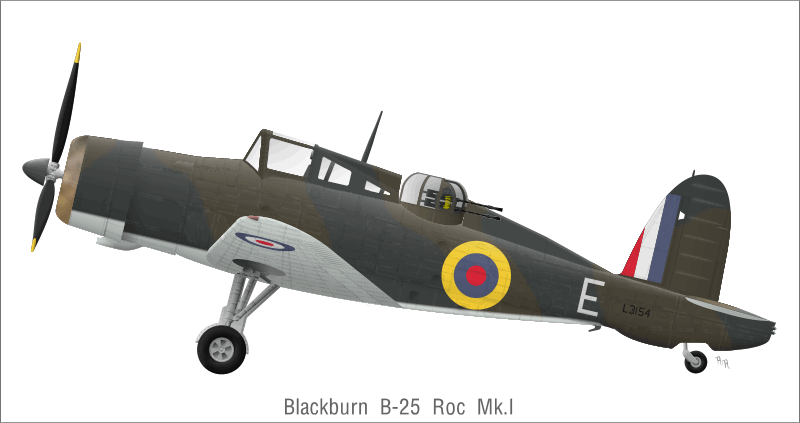
Blackburn Roc Mk.I

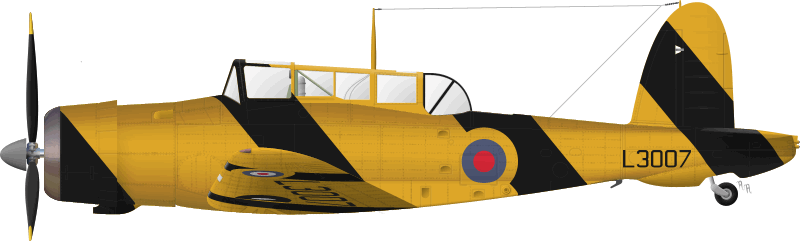
Blackburn Skua Mk.II (target tug markings)

- Blackburn Roc I fighter aircraft (January 1941 - April 1944)
- Bristol Blenheim light bomber (January - August 1941)
- Blackburn Skua Mk.II dive bomber and fighter aircraft (November 1941 - May 1944)
- Gloster Sea Gladiator biplane fighter aircraft (January - July 1942)
- Vought Chesapeake Mk.I dive bomber (May 1942 - April 1944)
- de Havilland Dominie short-haul airliner (November 1942 - June 1945)
- Fairey Fulmar Mk.II reconnaissance and fighter aircraft (August - September 1943)
- Airspeed Oxford trainer aircraft (August 1943 - July 1944)
- Hawker Sea Hurricane Mk IB fighter aircraft (October 1943 - July 1944)
- Fairey Swordfish I torpedo bomber (October - December 1943)
- Hawker Hurricane Mk.I fighter aircraft (November 1943 - April 1944)
- Bristol Blenheim Mk.IV light bomber (January 1944 - April 1945)
- Bristol Blenheim Mk.I light bomber (April 1944)
- Boulton Paul Defiant TT Mk III dedicated turret-less target tug (April 1944 - March 1945)
- Hawker Hurricane FB.lIC fighter aircraft (April 1944 - July 1945)
- Stinson Reliant I liaison and training aircraft (May - June 1944)
- Fairey Swordfish II torpedo bomber (June - December 1944)
- Hawker Sea Hurricane Mk IIC fighter aircraft (October 1944 - July 1945)
- Miles Martinet I target tug (March - October 1945)
- Supermarine Seafire Mk IlC fighter aircraft (May - October 1945)
- Beechcraft Traveller utility aircraft (1945)

== Naval air stations ==
776 Naval Air Squadron operated from a number of naval air stations of the Royal Navy, in the United Kingdom:

- Royal Naval Air Station Lee-on-Solent (HMS Daedalus), Hampshire, (1 January 1941 - 18 October 1942)
  - RN Air Section Speke, Merseyside, (Detachment Blackburn Roc 22 March 1941 - 18 October 1942)
  - Royal Air Force Woodvale, Merseyside, (Detachment 16 May 1942 - 7 April 1945)
- RN Air Section Speke, Merseyside, (18 October 1942 - 7 April 1945)
  - Royal Air Force Millom, Cumbria, (Detachment December 1942 - January 1945)
  - (Royal Air Force Waltham) Royal Air Force Grimsby, Lincolnshire, (Detachment 19 January 1943 - 7 December 1944)
  - Royal Air Force Llanbedr, Gwynedd, (Detachment 4 February - 28 June 1943)
  - Royal Air Force Usworth, Tyne and Wear, (Detachment 5 March - 12 July 1943)
  - Royal Air Force Andreas, Isle of Man, (Detachment 1 January - 7 February 1944)
  - Royal Air Force Walney Island, Cumbria, (Detachment 4 - 8 January 1945)
- Royal Naval Air Station Woodvale (HMS Ringtail II), Merseyside, (7 April 1945 - 6 October 1945)
- Royal Naval Air Station Burscough (HMS Ringtail), Lancashire, (6 October 1945 - 30 October 1945)
- disbanded - (30 October 1945)

== Commanding officers ==
List of commanding officers of 776 Naval Air Squadron with date of appointment:

- Lieutenant Commander E.J.E. Burt, RN, from 10 January 1941
- Lieutenant Commander(A) N.E. Goddard, DSC, RNVR, from 7 May 1942
- Lieutenant Commander(A) J. Goodyear, RNVR, from 19 August 1942
- Lieutenant Commander(A) B.A.G. Meads, MBE, RNVR, from 24 July 1943
- Lieutenant Commander(A) R.M.B. Ward, RNVR, from 10 April 1944
- Lieutenant Commander(A) N.G. Maclean, RNVR, from 24 January 1945
- disbanded - 30 October 1945

Note: Abbreviation (A) signifies Air Branch of the RN or RNVR.
