= RAF Worthy Down =

Former Royal Air Force station in Hampshire, England

RAF Worthy Down RNAS Worthy Down (HMS Kestrel) HMS Ariel
- Near South Wonston, Hampshire in England

Site information
- Type: Royal Air Force station
- Owner: Air Ministry 1917–1939; Admiralty 1939–1960
- Operator: Royal Air Force; Royal Navy
- Controlled by: RAF Bomber Command; Fleet Air Arm

Location
- Shown within Hampshire RAF Worthy Down (the United Kingdom)
- Coordinates: 51°06′37″N 001°19′08″W

Site history
- Built: 1917
- In use: 1917 – 1960
- Battles/wars: European theatre of World War II

Airfield information
- Elevation: 100 metres (328 ft) AMSL
Runways
Direction	Length and surface
N/S	704 metres (2,310 ft) Grass
E/W	1,280 metres (4,199 ft) Grass

Royal Air Force Worthy Down or simply RAF Worthy Down is a former Royal Air Force station built in 1918, 3.5 miles (6 km) north of Winchester, in Hampshire, England. After it was transferred to Royal Navy control in 1939 as Royal Naval Air Station Worthy Down (RNAS Worthy Down, or HMS Kestrel), the airfield remained in use throughout the Second World War, and then housed a RN Air Electrical School, HMS Ariel, from 1952. The airfield was in use until 1960. The site is now MOD Worthy Down.

== History ==
The site was first used as a military establishment when the War Office acquired the site for a Wireless and Observers School in 1917 before changing to the school of Army Co-operation in 1918 on the site of the Winchester Racecourse. In 1918, an airfield was built for the Royal Flying Corps (RFC), but before it was completed, the RFC was amalgamated with the Royal Naval Air Service to form the Royal Air Force. Nonetheless, the RFC does seem to have operated there to some degree before amalgamation, as Lieutenant Harold Percy Dawson, RFC, was killed in an air accident stated to be at Worthy Down on 9 March 1918.

=== Royal Air Force ===
The first squadron to use the airfield was No. 58 Squadron RAF which was reformed there on 1 April 1924. The squadron flew the Vickers Vimy and the Vickers Virginia before moving to RAF Upper Heyford on 13 January 1936. On 7 April 1927, No. 7 Squadron RAF moved from RAF Bircham Newton and stayed until 3 September 1936, flying the Virginia IX/X and the Handley Page Heyford II/III before moving to RAF Finningley. During this time, No. 102 Squadron RAF formed at the airfield on 1 October 1935, flying the Heyford II/III before leaving on 3 September 1936 for RAF Finningley. Also on 1 October 1935, No. 215 Squadron RAF reformed at the airfield; they flew the Virginia X and left on 14 March 1936 for RAF Upper Heyford.

On 8 August 1936, No. 49 Squadron RAF, flying the Hawker Hind, moved from RAF Bircham Newton; they left on 14 March 1938 for RAF Scampton. The next squadron to arrive was No. 35 Squadron RAF, on 26 August 1936, flying the Fairey Gordon, Vickers Wellesley and the Fairey Battle. They left for RAF Cottesmore on 20 April 1938. The last squadron to use RAF Worthy Down was No. 207 Squadron RAF, which moved to the airfield on 29 August 1936, flying the Gordon and Wellesley before leaving on 20 April 1938 for RAF Cottesmore.

The only Royal Air Force Squadron to use the airfield when it was under Royal Naval control was the Southampton University Air Squadron, who flew their de Havilland Tiger Moth trainers there during 1945–46.

==== Station commanders ====
data from
Commander	Dates
1 Dec 1926	Gp Capt Hon J D Boyle
4 Apr 1929	Gp Capt F K Haskins
6 Aug 1929	Gp Capt C H K Edmonds
7 Aug 1931	Gp Capt J R W Smyth-Pigott
16 Jan 1934	Wg Cdr/Gp Capt A A B Thomson
6 Nov 1936	Wg Cdr C H Keith
22 Aug 1937	Wg Cdr W Underhill

=== Royal Navy ===
The site was recommissioned by the Royal Navy in 1939 as HMS Kestrel, and used as a flying station by the Fleet Air Arm. During this time, the site was featured on the news when Lord Haw-Haw (William Joyce) claimed the Kriegsmarine sank HMS Kestrel. In 1950, it was placed in a state of care and maintenance until 1952, when it was re-established as HMS Ariel II and used as an engineering training school.

The following squadrons were based at Worthy Down at some point:

- 700 Naval Air Squadron between June 1945 and 1945
- 734 Naval Air Squadron used the airfield between February 1944 and sometime in 1945 with the Armstrong Whitworth Whitley GRVII.
- 739 Naval Air Squadron (BADU) between September 1943 and September 1944 with the Airspeed Oxford.
- 755 Naval Air Squadron formed at the airfield during 1939 and flew various aircraft including the Blackburn Shark, Hawker Osprey, Westland Lysander and Curtiss SO3C Seamew.
- 756 Naval Air Squadron – 1939–1943
- 757 Naval Air Squadron – 1939–1943
- 763 Naval Air Squadron – December 1939 – June 1940
- 763 (FAA Pool) Naval Air Squadron – February – July 1941
- 800 Naval Air Squadron – 1938–1939
- 803 Naval Air Squadron – 21 November 1938
- 806 Naval Air Squadron – May 1940
- 807 Naval Air Squadron – 15 September 1940
- 808 Naval Air Squadron – 1 July 1940 – 5 September 1940
- 811 Naval Air Squadron – October 1939
- 815 Naval Air Squadron – 15 October 1939 – May 1940
- 822 Naval Air Squadron – October 1939
- 848 Naval Air Squadron – November 1959 – March 1960
- Air Electrical School – June 1952 – 1 November 1960

Additionally, Supermarine used the airfield in the development of the Spitfire from December 1940 to March 1944.

== Current use ==
The technical site is now a tri-service establishment known as MOD Worthy Down, and the runway area is open grassland.

== See also ==
- Worthy Down Halt railway station
- List of former Royal Air Force stations
