= HM Prison Lancaster Farms =

Prison in Lancaster, England

HMP Lancaster Farms
- Location in Lancaster Location in the City of Lancaster district
- Location: Lancaster, Lancashire; 54°03′11″N 2°46′16″W
- Security class: Male category C
- Population: 549 (01 April 2013)
- Opened: 1993
- Managed by: HM Prison Services
- Governor: Emma Sunley
- Website: Lancaster Farms at justice.gov.uk

HM Prison Lancaster Farms is a category C male prison, located on the outskirts of Lancaster, Lancashire, England. The prison is operated by His Majesty's Prison Service, and is part of the HMP North Lancashire and Cumbria Estate (along with HMP Haverigg).

== History ==
Lancaster Farms Prison opened in March 1993 as a Young Offenders Institution and remand centre. Two new units were opened at the site in June 1996, doubling the prison's capacity. In May 2001 two of the prison's units were re-roled to hold juvenile prisoners.

In August 2001 The Howard League for Penal Reform claimed that conditions at Lancaster Farms Prison failed to meet standards laid out in the United Nations Convention on the Rights of the Child. Research found evidence of bullying, limited access to daylight or open air, lack of specialist training for staff and lack of individual care for inmates at the prison.

In July 2003 Lancaster Farms was found to be one of the five highest performing prisons in England and Wales. The league table was compiled by HM Prison Service.

In April 2007 a report from Her Majesty's Chief Inspector of Prisons stated that conditions were improving at Lancaster Farms, and that the prison maintained a reasonably safe and respectful environment. However the report criticised the amount of time inmates spent in their cells, and urged improvement in the prison's anti-bullying procedures and education opportunities.

Over the course of 2008 and 2009, all remaining juvenile inmates were transferred from Lancaster Farms to other prisons and the establishment was dedicated to holding young offenders aged 18 to 21.

Lee Davies, corrections officer who worked at Lancaster Farms, smuggled mobile phones and drugs into that prison before being caught while on duty. He served a few months in prison in 2012.

In September 2014, the prison was once again re-roled to hold category C adult male prisoners from the NW region.

== Current status ==
Lancaster Farms holds only sentenced category C adult males from Northwest England, especially from the Greater Manchester area. The prison, which has four secure units, comprises mostly single occupancy cells although there are some double cells.

Activities for inmates at the prison include Learning & Skills, Workshops (including Painting and Decorating, Building Trades, Multi-skills, Art, Information Technology, Catering, Waste Management), Farms & Gardens, Industrial Cleaning and Physical Education. Several partner organisations are located on-site, they include Lancashire Probation Trust, Lancashire Youth Offending Team, Manchester College, Lancashire Care Foundation Trust, Connexions, Jobcentre Plus, Lifeline, SOVA, the National Youth Advocacy Service, the YMCA, the British Red Cross and the Prince's Trust.

== Notable inmates ==
- Elliot Castro, fraudster who served four months in the young offenders' institute in 2001
- Sean Mercer, shot dead 11-year-old boy in Liverpool in August 2007.
