= Blackburn Skua =

British carrier-based fighter-bomber

B-24 Skua
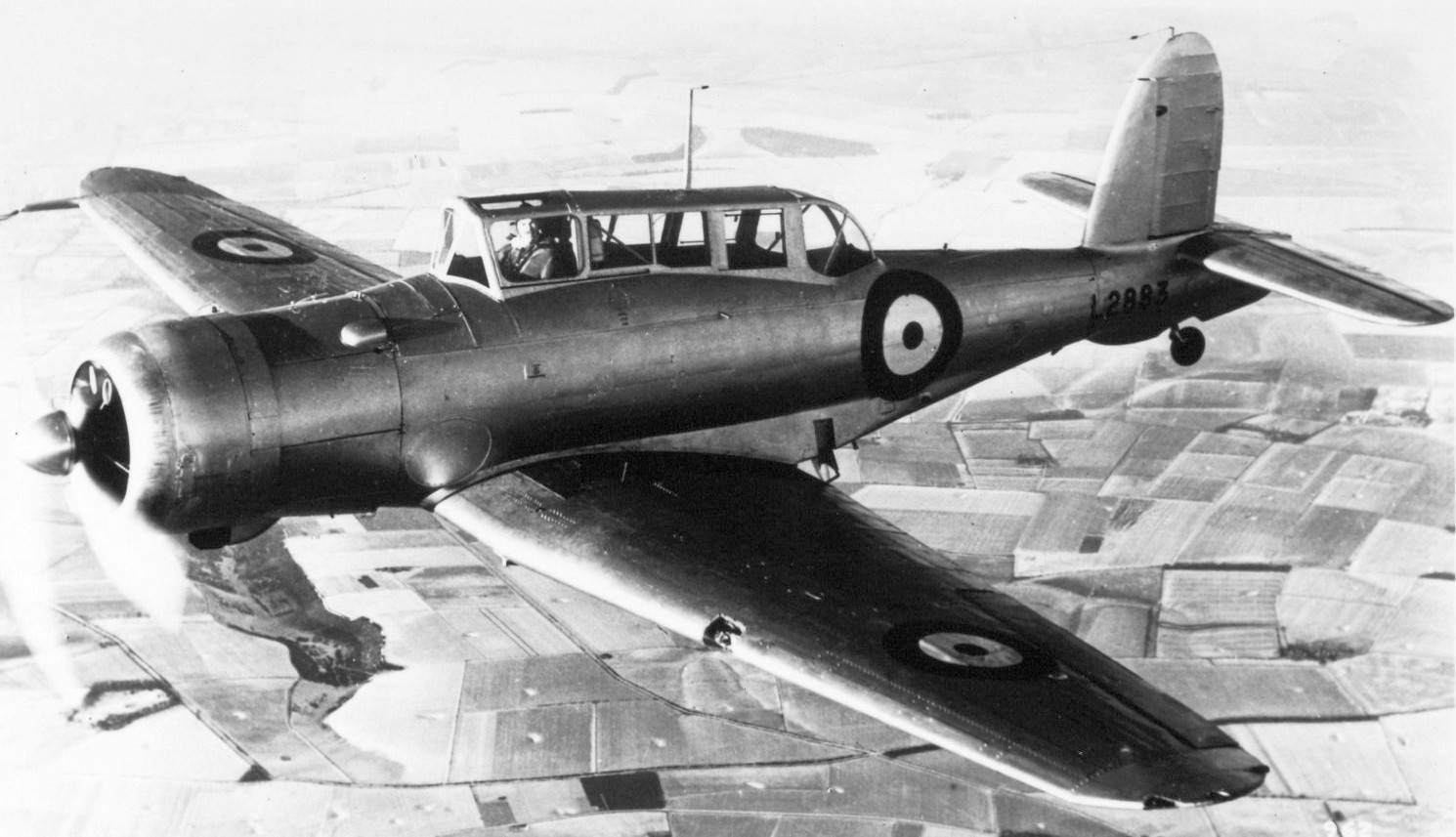
- Blackburn Skua in flight

General information
- Type: Carrier-based fighter-bomber
- Manufacturer: Blackburn Aircraft
- Primary user: Fleet Air Arm
- Number built: 192

History
- Introduction date: November 1938
- First flight: 9 February 1937
- Retired: 1941 (withdrawn from front line); March 1945 (withdrawn from other duties)
- Developed into: Blackburn Roc

The Blackburn B-24 Skua was a carrier-based low-wing, two-seater, single-radial engine aircraft by the British aviation company Blackburn Aircraft. It was the first Royal Navy carrier-borne all-metal cantilever monoplane aircraft, as well as the first dive bomber in Fleet Air Arm (FAA) service. The aircraft took its name from the sea bird which dives on any potential predators that come too close to its nest.

The Skua was designed during the mid-1930s to Specification O.27/34, and was a radical design for the era, combining the functions of a dive bomber and fighter. Its enclosed cockpit and monoplane configuration were obvious shifts from preceding FAA aircraft such as the Hawker Nimrod and Hawker Osprey biplanes. On 9 February 1937, the first prototype performed its maiden flight; it was ordered straight off the drawing board to accelerate its development. In November 1938, the Skua was introduced to FAA service; 33 aircraft were operational by the outbreak of the Second World War.

Early in the war, the Skua was involved in the Norwegian campaign and sank the German cruiser Königsberg, the first big warship sunk in war by air attack and by dive-bombers. It was present during the Battles of Narvik, the Dunkirk evacuation and also the early stages of the Mediterranean theatre. While a capable dive bomber, its poor top speed and rate of climb meant it was severely limited as a fighter. Despite this, Fleet Air Arm pilots achieved moderate success with the Skua, scoring numerous aerial victories during the Norwegian and Mediterranean campaigns, with at least one pilot making ace status with five victories. In 1941, the Skua was relegated from frontline operations, but continued to be operated in secondary roles, typically training and target tug duties, as late as March 1945.

== Development ==
The origins of the Skua can be traced back to the Air Ministry's issuing of Specification O.27/34, which sought a naval dive bomber whose primary role would be to disable or destroy enemy aircraft carriers with a secondary role as a fighter. Blackburn chose to produce its own response under the internal design reference B-24, the design effort was headed by the aeronautical engineer G. E. Petty. Many competing companies also responded, including Avro, Boulton Paul, Hawker and Vickers. Blackburn's submission would emerge as the victor, despite several of the competing proposals adopting similar layouts. Being Blackburn's first dive bomber, the design was occasionally referred to as the D.B.1.

During April 1935, Blackburn received an initial order for a pair of prototypes. On 9 February 1937, the first of these, serial number K5178, performed its maiden flight from the company's facility in Brough, piloted by A. M. Blake. Unusually, it was initially painted in a distinctive grey-and-white colour scheme. On 26 June, the aircraft was first displayed to the public at RAF Hendon, London, and performed an aerial display at RAF Hatfield Woodhouse two days later. Two months later, the Skua name was officially assigned to the type by the Air Ministry.

During the latter part of 1937, the aircraft underwent official handling trials with the Aeroplane and Armament Experimental Establishment (A&AEE) at RAF Martlesham Heath. On 4 May 1938, the second prototype performed its first flight; it differed from the first by having a longer nose. Both of the prototypes would participate in the various tests, including gunnery trials, that were performed at Martlesham up until early 1939. Ditching trials were also undertaken at RAF Gosport.

Both prototypes were powered by the Bristol Mercury XII radial engine; however, production Skuas were instead powered by the Bristol Perseus XII, largely due to the Mercury engine being prioritised for Bristol Blenheim production. Another change made on production aircraft was the elimination of the wing tip slots, as they were deemed unnecessary after handling tests revealed mild stall characteristics. Due to the growing urgency for more combat aircraft in the runup to the Second World War, an initial production contract for 190 Skuas was issued in July 1935, effectively being ordered straight from the drawing board. To accelerate production, it was decided to produce the mainplanes at the Olympia Works in Leeds, while a subcontracting arrangement with General Aircraft Limited saw this company build additional fuselages at its Hanworth facility.

On 28 August 1938, the first production Skua Mk.II, L2867, performed its first flight at Brough, piloted by H. J. Wilson. Both it and the second production aircraft were dispatched to Martlesham to accelerate the last stage of performance trials, which included armament trials. According to the aviation author Aubrey Joseph Jackson, despite the relatively radical nature of the design, relatively few changes were recommended either by the Air Ministry or the engine manufacturer; one of the few modifications requested was the strengthening of the wingtips and a substitute tail oleo. Almost all of the production run was completed and delivered prior to the end of 1939, 26 Skuas were delivered during the month of July alone. However, due to delays in the overall programme, the Admiralty had also ordered the Fairey Fulmar to perform the same role.

== Design ==
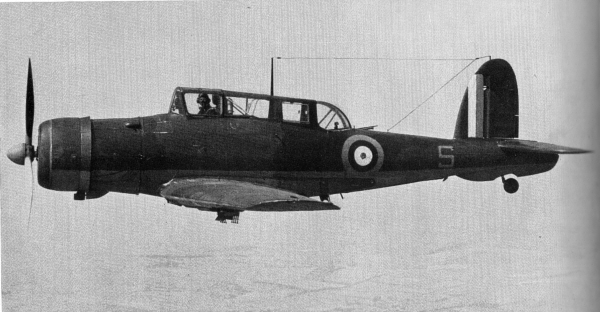
Production Skua Mk.II, L2928 "S" of 759 Squadron. This aircraft also served with 801 Squadron in the Norwegian Campaign, and, flying from RAF Detling, was present at Dunkirk.

The Blackburn Skua was configured as a low-wing cantilever monoplane of all-metal construction. Its fuselage drew on the design of the Blackburn Shark, an earlier biplane, making extensive use of flush-riveted Alclad. It was internally divided into two water-tight compartments beneath the pilot's and gunner's cockpits to provide sufficient buoyancy in the event of a forcing landing at sea. For the same reason, the crew compartments were also watertight up to the edges of the cockpit. The fuselage was stressed to withstand catapult-assisted takeoffs and arrested landings aboard aircraft carriers; a hydraulic damping device was incorporated in the hook.

The mainplane, both the structure and covering of which was also composed of Alclad, was built as three separate units. The twin-spar heavy centre section was bolted beneath the fuselage to form the bottom of the watertight compartment. The outer wing panels, which tapered in both plan and thickness, ended in detachable upswept tips and were sealed between the main spars to form additional watertight compartments. Recesses in the lower surface of the wing accommodated modified Zap flaps that were used to shorten takeoff runs, steepen glides, and limit the aircraft's speed during steep dives. Balanced ailerons were fitted, which used inset hinges with mass balance assistance.

Considerable design complexity was incurred by the choice to have both a retractable undercarriage and folding wings; the solution drew on the earlier Blackburn Airedale monoplane. When folded, the wings moved back around an inclined hinge housed within the wing, enabling a twist in the movement so that they rest against the fuselage; latch pins were used to secure them in place. The main undercarriage retracted both outwards and upwards into circular wheel wells in the underside of the outer wing panels, the motion being powered by an engine-driven hydraulic pump. The tail wheel unit was fitted with a Dowty-supplied self-centering shock absorber strut and an electrically conductive tyre. Both tailplane and fin were metal-clad cantilever structures that bolted directly onto the rear frames of the fuselage. Controllable trim tabs and a horn-balanced rudder were fitted, to ensure rapid spin recovery, a portion of the tailplane and the entirety of the fabric-covered elevator was positioned behind the trailing edge of the rudder.

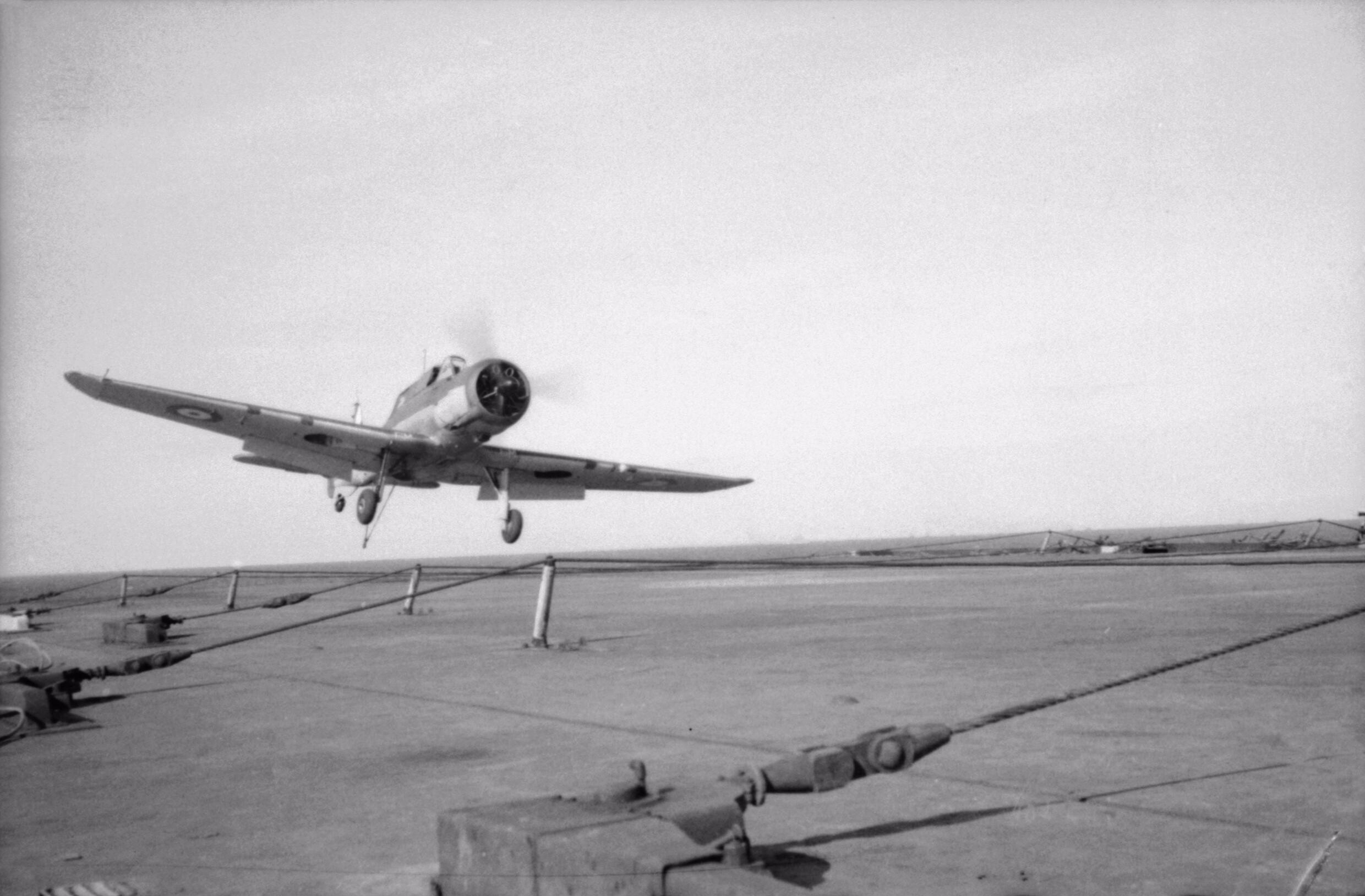
A Skua about to land on HMS Ark Royal, April 1941

The crew were accommodated beneath an enclosed glazed cockpit enclosure strengthened by two fuselage frames that formed a crash pylon in the event of the aircraft turning over. It was the Fleet Air Arm's first service monoplane and was a radical departure for a force that was primarily equipped with open-cockpit biplanes such as the Fairey Swordfish. The pilot's position featured a sliding hood and was provided with favourable visibility in most forward-facing directions, while the gunner was seated after of the wing beneath a tilting canopy that could be opened or closed dependent on whether the defensive gun was being operated. This machine gun was stored in a compartment within the rear decking when not in use.

Various key elements of the aircraft were housed between the pilot and gunner's positions. A Wireless compartment was positioned directly behind the pilot. The majority of the fuel was stored in two tanks positioned between the crew members, with a reserve tank in the forward fuselage; the pilot could select for fuel to be drawn from any combination of these tanks via a single selector cock. Just forward of the pilot's instrumentation was a tank for lubricating oil. The aircraft's armament of four fixed, forward-firing 0.303 in Browning machine guns in the wings and a single flexible, rearward-firing .303 in Vickers K machine gun was considered to be effective for the era. For the dive-bombing role, a 250 lb (110 kg) or 500 lb (230 kg) bomb was carried on a special swinging "trapeze" crutch under the fuselage (somewhat like that of the Junkers Ju 87), which enabled the bomb to clear the propeller arc on release. Four 40 lb (18 kg) bombs or eight 20 lb (9.1 kg) Cooper bombs could also be carried in racks under each wing.

Its performance as a fighter was compromised by its dual role as a dive bomber. The size of the two-seat aircraft, and the extra strengthening of the air frame required to allow it to withstand the stresses of sustained high-speed dives, meant it was a relatively heavy single-engined aircraft at 8,300 lb (3,800 kg) gross, compared to 5,900 lb (2,700 kg) for the Spitfire Mk1. That was compounded by various features included to suit its naval use, such as an arrester hook, folding wings, a relatively large fuel capacity, watertight compartments, rafts, and a rear gunner/observer. That weight, coupled with the limited power from the 890 hp (660 kW) Perseus engine, meant the aircraft had a low rate of climb compared to contemporary Japanese Mitsubishi A5M (Note: Mitsubishi A5M4 with a Nakajima Kotobuki 41 engine) and American Grumman F3F carrier-borne fighters (Note: Grumman F3F-3 with a Wright R-1820-22 "Cyclone" nine-cylinder radial engine) along with the Royal Navy's Gloster Sea Gladiator. The Skua was designed for best performance at low altitude, where its speed was comparable to potential enemy bomber aircraft, and the Skua, with four wing-mounted Browning machine guns, was much better armed than any other nation's pre-war naval fighter, such as the Mitsubishi A5M "Claude" and the Grumman F3F, having only two machine guns each. All those naval fighters compared unfavourably with land-based fighters such as the Messerschmitt Bf 109, (Note: Messerschmitt Bf 109E with DB601A engine) which reached 290 mph (470 km/h) at sea level over the Skua's 225 mph (362 km/h), and the Gloster Sea Gladiator's 209 mph (336 km/h). However the Skua in the fighter role was never intended or envisaged to take on land-based fighters such as the Messerschmitt Bf 109. The Royal Navy and RAF (who at the time its specification was drawn up operated aircraft carrier air wings) only intended the aircraft to take on enemy reconnaissance and bomber aircraft.

The Skua was, however, an effective dive bomber, which was arguably its main intended role. It scored numerous successes as a dive bomber in the Norwegian campaign, sinking and damaging a number of ships, most notably the German cruiser Königsberg on 10 April 1940. Royal Navy test pilot Captain Eric 'Winkle' Brown stated:

"It was while diving that the Skua really came into its own...subsequently I was to fly quite a number of US and German dive bombers and the Skua matched up well with the best of these as regards to its diving characteristics, but it had only a two-position propeller and this tended to overspeed in the dive before terminal velocity was reached. However, a nicely screaming propeller was always to be considered a psychologically aggressive asset in any dive bomber."

== Operational history ==
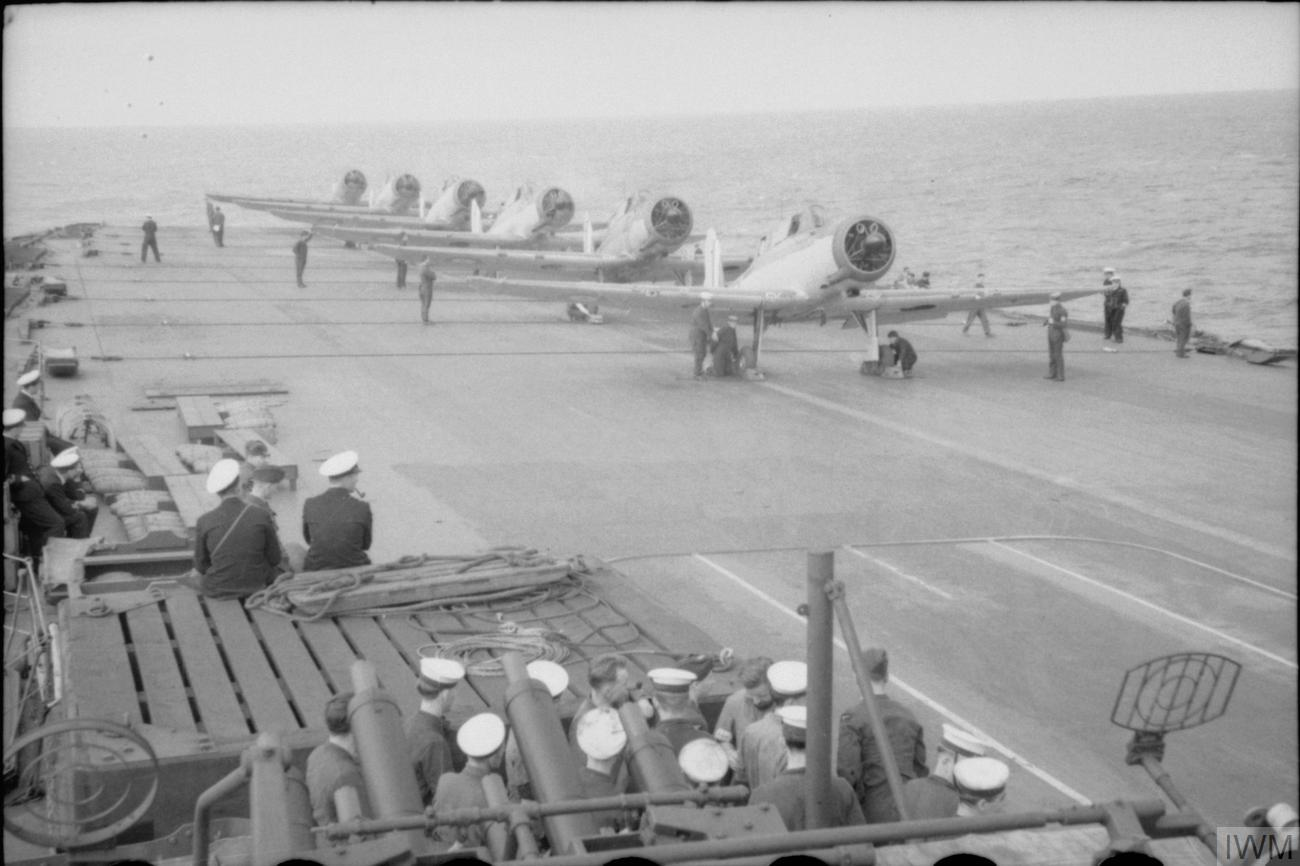
Skuas of 800 Naval Air Squadron lined up on the flight deck of Ark Royal

During late 1938, initial deliveries of the Skua commenced; the first unit to receive it was 800 Naval Air Squadron at Worthy Down, supplementing and eventually replacing their Hawker Nimrod and Hawker Osprey biplanes. By November, the squadron had embarked on HMS Ark Royal and, during 1939, was followed by both 801 and 803 Squadrons. By the start of the Second World War, there were 33 operational Skuas; the type quickly proved itself in combat. On 14 September, three Skuas took off from Ark Royal to go to the aid of the Fanad Head which had been attacked by a U-boat. When they arrived, the Fanad Head was being shelled by the German submarine U-30 and all three dived to attack the submarine, which quickly dived to safety. Two of the Skuas were damaged by the blast of their 112 lb A/S bombs and had to ditch. This was due to that the bombs had been incorrectly fused with too brief a time lapse. As a result of this error the weapons detonated almost instantaneously, thus badly damaging the Skuas. U-30 returned to Germany with the crews of the two ditched Skuas, who became the first naval airmen to be prisoners of war in the conflict.

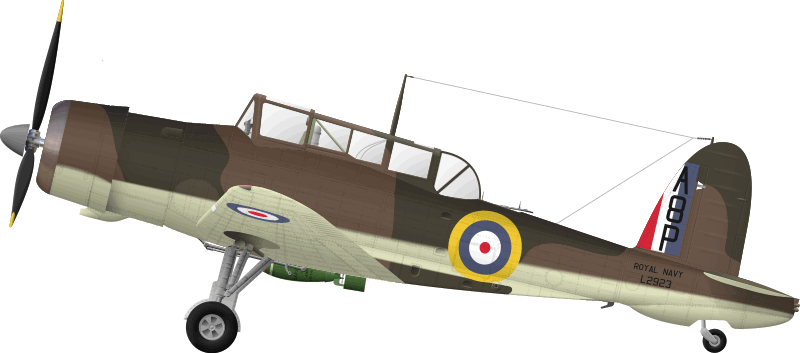
Skua L2923, Red-1 of 803 Naval Air Squadron. One of 16 Skuas from RNAS Hatston to attack and sink the Königsberg in Bergen on 10 April 1940. This aircraft spun on the return flight and crashed, the only aircraft lost on that day.

Skuas were originally credited with the first confirmed kill by British aircraft during the Second World War; on 26 September 1939, three Skuas of 803 Naval Air Squadron, flying from Ark Royal, shot down a Dornier Do 18 flying boat over the North Sea. (An earlier victory by a Fairey Battle on 20 September 1939 over Aachen, was later confirmed by French sources). On 10 April 1940, 16 Skuas of 800 and 803 NAS led by Lieutenant Commander William Lucy, flying from RNAS Hatston in the Orkney Islands made a 330 mile night flight to arrive at the very limit of their radius - at dawn over Bergen Harbour. They attacked and sank Königsberg with several direct hits. Jackson wrote of the sinking as being the high point of the Skua's career as a dive-bomber. Königsberg was the first major warship ever sunk in war by air attack and the first major warship ever to be sunk by dive bombing. On 26 and 27 April Skuas destroyed eight He 111 bombers and damaged several more whilst defending the fleet.

During June 1940, Skuas of 801 Squadron flew from shore bases in Kent in support of the Dunkirk evacuation, acting as a unit of RAF Fighter Command. However, these Skuas were attacked on several occasions by RAF fighters who were unfamiliar with the aircraft and its paint scheme, with at least one aircraft being shot up by Spitfires and the gunner killed. It was to later crash land at Manston airfield. Following replenishment, Ark Royal brought along a flight of Skuas on its deployment into the Mediterranean later that year; it was these Skuas that dive-bombed the Richelieu in Dakar in September 1940.

On 13 June 1940, two mostly-Skua squadrons suffered heavy losses during an attempt to bomb the Scharnhorst at Trondheim; of 15 aircraft in the raid, eight were shot down and the crews killed or taken prisoner. Among the latter were both squadron commanders, Captain RT Partridge (RM) and Lieutenant Commander John Casson (RN). One bomb hit Scharnhorst; however, this did little damage.

Despite its limitations, the Skua attained considerable success as a fighter against Axis bombers and flying boats over Norway, and to a lesser extent, in the Mediterranean in the early stages of the conflict. In action off Norway Skuas destroyed 28 Luftwaffe aircraft in air to air combat, including 17 He 111s and five Ju 88s; all kills being confirmed via Luftwaffe records. Lieutenant Commander William Lucy went on to become a fighter ace while flying his Skua. Later on the Skua was found to be too slow and under-powered to be an effective fleet defence fighter. Common Axis aircraft such as the Junkers Ju 88 and Savoia-Marchetti SM.79 were much faster than the Skua, making interception of these aircraft extremely difficult. The armament of four forward-firing .303 rifle caliber machine guns was becoming increasingly inadequate for this role and the type was withdrawn from front line service during 1941. Most Skuas were replaced by another two-seater, the Fulmar, which doubled the Skua's forward armament and had a speed advantage of 50 mph (80 km/h). A number of aircraft were converted to target tugs, following withdrawal from front line service. Other Skuas were completed as target tugs from the factory and used by the RAF and Fleet Air Arm in this role (Fleet Requirements). The Skua were also used as an advanced trainer for the Fleet Air Arm. The last Skua in service was struck off charge in March 1945.

The Blackburn Roc was a very similar aircraft developed as a turret fighter, with all its armament in a dorsal turret. The Roc was expected to fly with the Skua. Rocs were attached to Skua squadrons to protect the fleet anchorage at Scapa Flow in early 1940 and briefly from HMS Glorious and Ark Royal during the Norwegian Campaign. Skuas and Rocs flew fighter sweeps and bombing sorties over the English Channel during Operation Dynamo and Operation Aerial, the evacuations of Allied forces from Dunkirk and other French ports.

== Variants ==
Skua Mk.I
Two prototypes. Powered by the Bristol Mercury, it had distinctive fairings to the engine cowling over the tappet valves of the Mercury. The first prototype, K5178, had a much shorter nose while K5179, the second prototype, had a lengthened nose to improve longitudinal stability.
Skua Mk.II
Production aircraft powered by the sleeve valve Bristol Perseus. Long nose as per K5179 but with a shorter, smooth cowling. Two-seat fighter and dive bomber for the Royal Navy; 190 built by Blackburn at Brough Aerodrome.

== Surviving aircraft ==
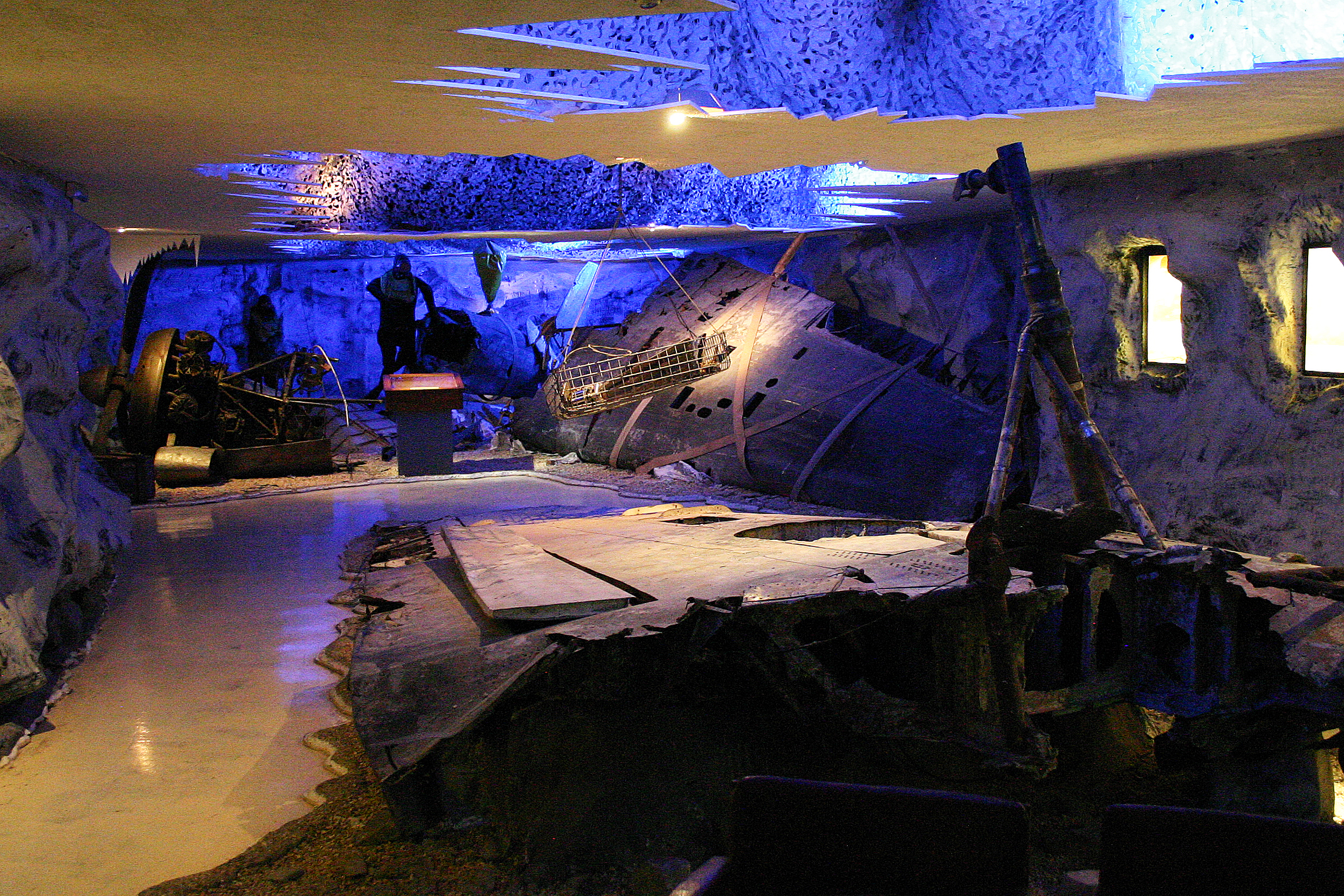
Blackburn Skua L2940 wreck on display at the Fleet Air Arm Museum

No intact Skuas survive. In April 2007 the only known fairly complete Blackburn Skua was discovered in Orkdalsfjorden in Norway at a depth of 794 ft (242 m). Due to an engine failure, the Skua, flown by John Casson, leader of 803 Squadron, had to make an emergency water landing in the fjord. Both crew members survived and spent the next five years as prisoners of war. Despite efforts to raise the aircraft to the surface as gently as possible, the tail broke off. The engine had become detached in the ditching. The fuselage, cockpit and wings were salvaged. The Skua will be restored at Norway's aviation museum in Bodø. In 1974, L2940 was recovered from Breidalsvatnet lake, near Grotli in Skjåk Municipality in Norway. Captain R. T. Partridge (RM) shot down a Heinkel He 111 and then made an emergency landing on the ice-covered lake on 27 April 1940. Survivors from both aeroplanes independently made their way to a mountain lodge, where they encountered each other. This incident serves as the basis for the film Into the White.

== Operators and units ==
United Kingdom

- Fleet Air Arm

- 755 Naval Air Squadron
- 757 Naval Air Squadron
- 758 Naval Air Squadron
- 759 Naval Air Squadron
- 760 Naval Air Squadron
- 767 Naval Air Squadron
- 769 Naval Air Squadron
- 770 Naval Air Squadron
- 771 Naval Air Squadron

- 772 Naval Air Squadron
- 774 Naval Air Squadron
- 776 Naval Air Squadron
- 778 Naval Air Squadron
- 779 Naval Air Squadron
- 780 Naval Air Squadron
- 782 Naval Air Squadron
- 787 Naval Air Squadron
- 788 Naval Air Squadron

- 789 Naval Air Squadron
- 791 Naval Air Squadron
- 792 Naval Air Squadron
- 794 Naval Air Squadron
- 797 Naval Air Squadron
- 800 Naval Air Squadron
- 801 Naval Air Squadron
- 803 Naval Air Squadron
- 806 Naval Air Squadron

- Royal Air Force
  - RAF Anti-Aircraft Co-operation Units

== Specifications (Skua Mk. II) ==
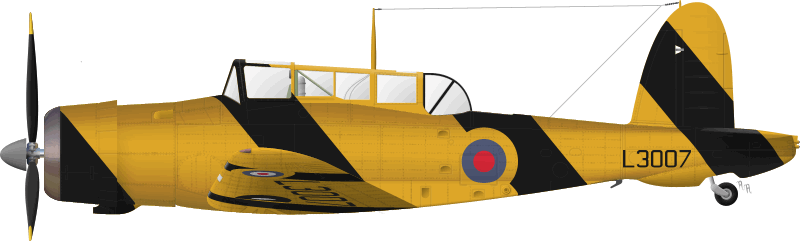
Skua L3007 in target tug markings, 1941

Data from Blackburn Aircraft since 1909

General characteristics

- Crew: 2
- Length: 35 ft 7 in (10.85 m)
- Wingspan: 46 ft 2 in (14.07 m)
- Height: 12 ft 6 in (3.81 m)
- Wing area: 319 sq ft (29.6 m^{2})
- Airfoil: root: NACA 2416; tip: NACA 2409
- Empty weight: 5,496 lb (2,493 kg)
- Gross weight: 8,228 lb (3,732 kg)
- Powerplant: 1 × Bristol Perseus XII nine-cylinder air-cooled radial sleeve-valve piston engine, 890 hp (660 kW)
- Propellers: 3-bladed variable-pitch propeller

Performance

- Maximum speed: 225 mph (362 km/h, 196 kn) at 6,500 ft (1,981 m)
- Cruise speed: 187 mph (301 km/h, 162 kn)
- Range: 760 mi (1,220 km, 660 nmi)
- Service ceiling: 20,200 ft (6,200 m)
- Rate of climb: 1,580 ft/min (8.0 m/s)

Armament

- Guns:
  - 4 × 0.303 in (7.7 mm) forward-firing Browning machine guns with 600 rounds per gun
  - 1 × 0.303 in (7.7 mm) Lewis or Vickers K machine gun on flexible mount in rear cockpit
- Bombs: 1 × 500 lb (230 kg) semi-armour piercing bomb under fuselage or 8 × 30 lb (14 kg) practice bombs under wings

== See also ==
Related development

- Blackburn Roc

Aircraft of comparable role, configuration, and era

- Aichi D3A
- Vought SB2U Vindicator
- Douglas SBD Dauntless
- Junkers Ju 87 Stuka

Related lists

- List of aircraft of the Fleet Air Arm
- List of aircraft of the Royal Air Force
- List of bomber aircraft
- List of aircraft of World War II
