= RAF Millom =

Former Royal Air Force station in Cumbria, England

Coordinates: 54°12′02″N 3°19′29″W

RAF Millom
- Near Millom, Cumbria in England

Site information
- Type: Royal Air Force station
- Owner: Air Ministry
- Operator: Royal Air Force
- Controlled by: RAF Flying Training Command
- Defunct museum: RAF Millom Aviation & Military Museum

Location
- Location in Copeland Borough RAF Millom (Cumbria) RAF Millom (the United Kingdom)

Site history
- Built: 1940
- In use: 1941-1960
- Battles/wars: Second World War

Royal Air Force Millom or more simply RAF Millom is a former Royal Air Force station located in Cumbria, England

== History ==
Opened in January 1941 as No.2 bombing and gunnery school and in summer became No. 2 Air Observer School. In 1942 it became No. 2 Observer Advanced Flying Unit until 1945, and in 1946 it was put under care and maintenance until 1953 when it was reopened for a 12-month period as No.1 Officer Cadet Training Unit. No. 1 O.C.T.U. departed the station in September 1953, and relocated to RAF Jurby on the Isle of Man.

The following units were here at some point:

- 'R' Flight of No. 1 Anti-Aircraft Co-operation Unit RAF
- No. 2 Air Observers School RAF
- No. 2 Bombing & Gunnery School RAF
- No. 2 (Observers) Advanced Flying Unit RAF
- No. 14 Air Crew Holding Unit RAF
- 776 Naval Air Squadron
- 822 Naval Air Squadron

== Museum ==
RAF Millom Museum
- Established: 1992
- Dissolved: 2010

The RAF Millom Aviation & Military Museum was a museum of the British Royal Air Force bombing and gunnery school, located in Millom, Cumbria.

RAF Millom was then again put under care and maintenance until the 1960s when various army regiments passed through. HM Prison Service took it over in 1967.

The museum project originated in a very small way in 1992, however due to a great deal of hard work by volunteers and ex-servicemen and women of the old RAF Millom the collection has all but outgrown the present buildings and the yard.

=== Museum closure ===
The museum was in financial difficulties during the summer of 2010 and was asked to vacate its current main site by the Ministry of Justice – owners of the buildings the museum occupies which is part of the original airfield now occupied by HM Prison Haverigg. Negotiations failed regarding a new lease agreement.

The permanent closure was confirmed on 1 September 2010 with outstanding debts being the driving force. Much of the museum's exhibits were on loan and have been returned to owners. Millom Discovery Centre now has some of the exhibits relating to the very local area, but is limited for space.

== Current use ==
The site is now HM Prison Haverigg.

== In popular culture ==
In July 2005, the archaeological television programme Time Team, along with members of RAF Millom Museum, took part in a major project to excavate the crash sites of two Douglas A-26 Invader aircraft that had collided shortly after take-off over marshes close to the then United States Army Air Forces BAD 2 airbase at Warton in Lancashire on 29 November 1944. The aircraft had been en route to Brétigny, Oise in northern France to take up service with the 641st Bombardment Squadron of the 409th Bombardment Group.
