= 755 Naval Air Squadron =

Inactive flying squadron of the Royal Navy's Fleet Air Arm

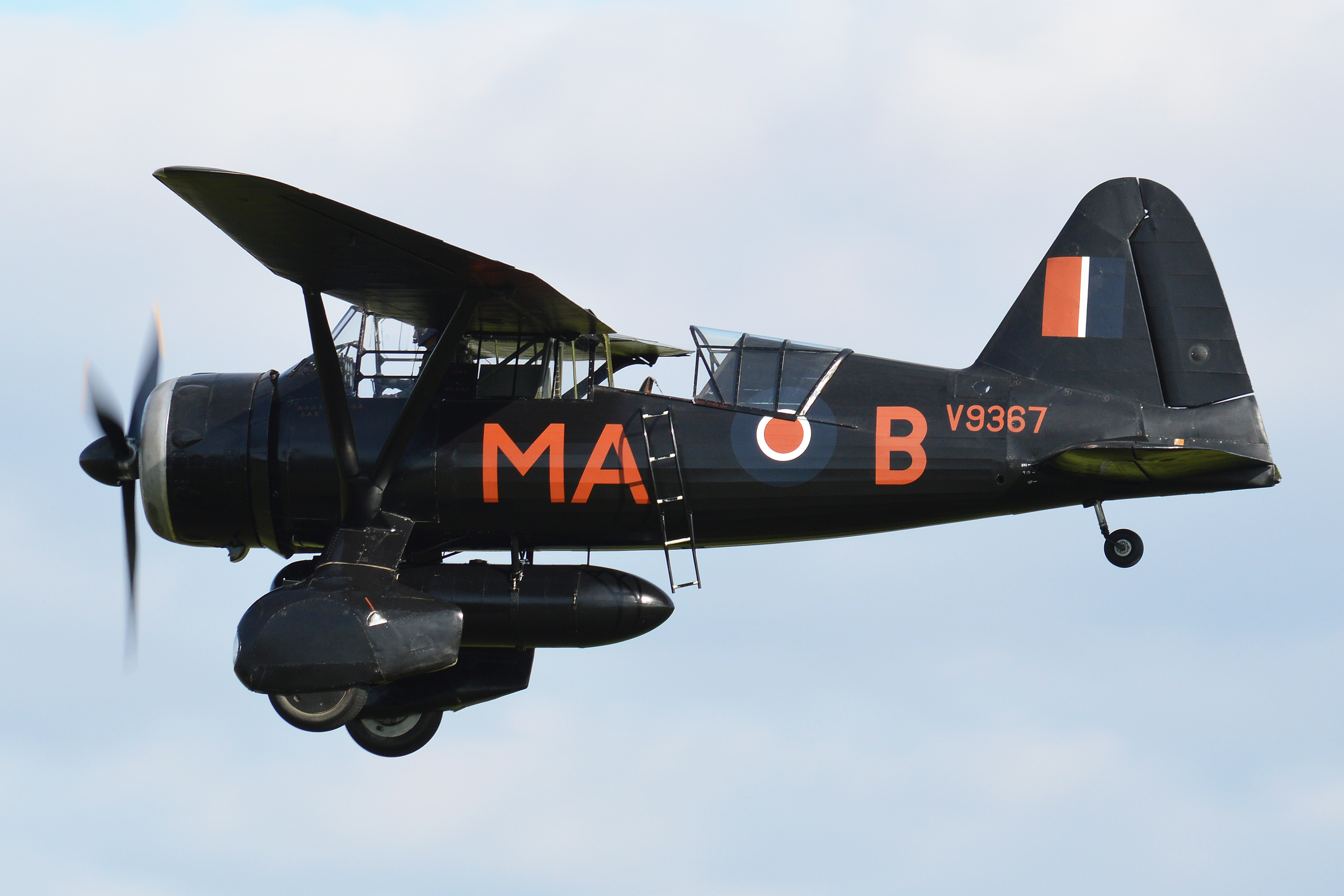
- Westland Lysander IIIa, an example of the type used by 755 NAS
- Active: 1939–1944; 1945
- Disbanded: 31 October 1945
- Country: United Kingdom
- Branch: Royal Navy
- Type: Fleet Air Arm Second Line Squadron
- Role: Telegraphist Air Gunner Training Squadron; Communications Squadron
- Size: Squadron
- Part of: Fleet Air Arm
- Home station: See Naval air stations section for full list.
- Aircraft: See Aircraft operated section for full list.

Insignia
- Identification Markings: X2A+ W6A+ (1943)

755 Naval Air Squadron (755 NAS) was a Fleet Air Arm (FAA) naval air squadron of the United Kingdom's Royal Navy (RN). It was first formed as a Telegraphist Air Gunner Training Squadron from 1939 to 1944. Initially operating out of HMS Kestrel, RNAS Worthy Down, the squadron also had a brief, roughly two-month stint, at RNAS Jersey, which was cut shorter than anticipated by the German occupation of France and the danger this posed to the Channel Islands. It then briefly reformed as a Communications Squadron at HMS Bherunda, RNAS Colombo Racecourse, Sri Lanka, during 1945.

== History ==
=== Telegraphist Air Gunner Training Squadron (1939-1944) ===
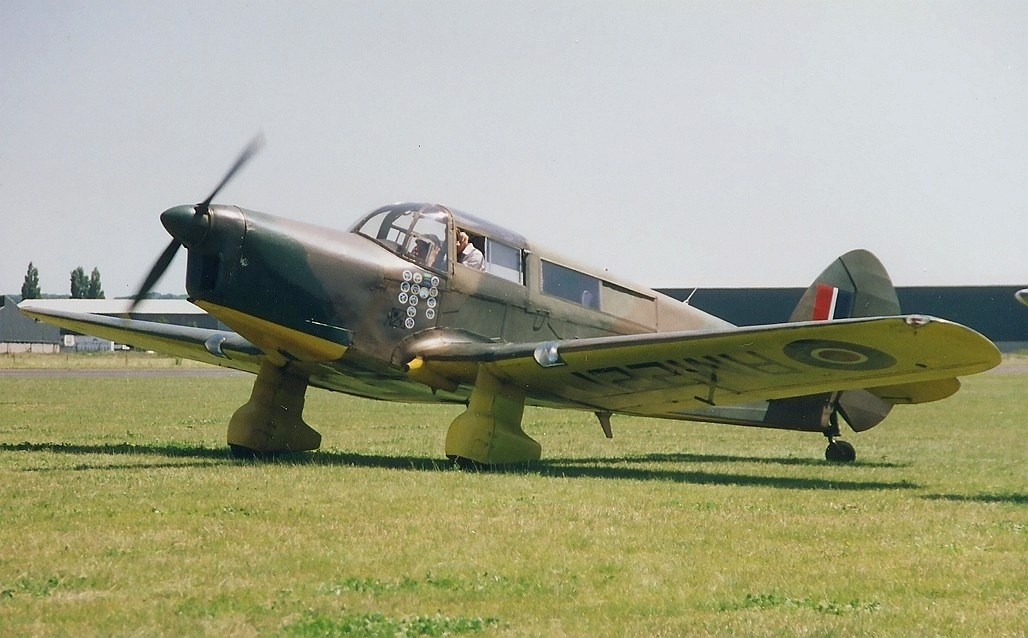
Percival P-31C Proctor IV, seen in RAF markings. An example of the type used by 755 NAS

755 Naval Air Squadron formed at RNAS Worthy Down (HMS Kestrel), 3.5 miles (6 km) north of Winchester, Hampshire, England, on 24 May 1939, as a Telegraphist Air Gunner Training Squadron. It was initially equipped with Hawker Osprey, a navalised carrier-borne version of the Hawker Hart light bomber, performing in the fighter and reconnaissance roles and Blackburn Shark Mk III, a torpedo bomber and reconnaissance aircraft, however, various marks of Percival Proctor (Ia, II, IIa, III and IV), a deck landing and radio trainer aircraft, were also operated from November 1939.

The squadron moved to the short lived RNAS Jersey on the 11 March 1940 taking its assembly of Percival Proctor, Hawker Osprey and Blackburn Shark aircraft. In early March the Admiralty had taken over Jersey Airport, located at St Peter, Jersey, Channel Islands, to use as a Naval air station. However, due to the German occupation of France and the proximity to the Channel Islands, the Government concluded the Islands weren't defendable and 755 Naval Air Squadron moved back to RNAS Worthy Down on 31 May 1940.

The squadron stopped using Hawker Osprey at the beginning of 1941, and from July onwards it was also equipped with Westland Lysander TT.III, a British army co-operation and liaison aircraft, converted to a target tug and flew these alongside the Percival Proctor and Blackburn Shark aircraft during the next couple of years. In October 1943, the squadron swapped its Blackburn Shark for Curtiss Seamew I, an observation floatplane and for the following twelve months 755 Naval Air Squadron provided Telegraphist Air Gunner training, with Westland Lysander, Percival Proctor and Curtiss Seamew until disbanding, at RNAS Worthy Down, on 31 October 1944.

=== Communications Squadron (1945) ===
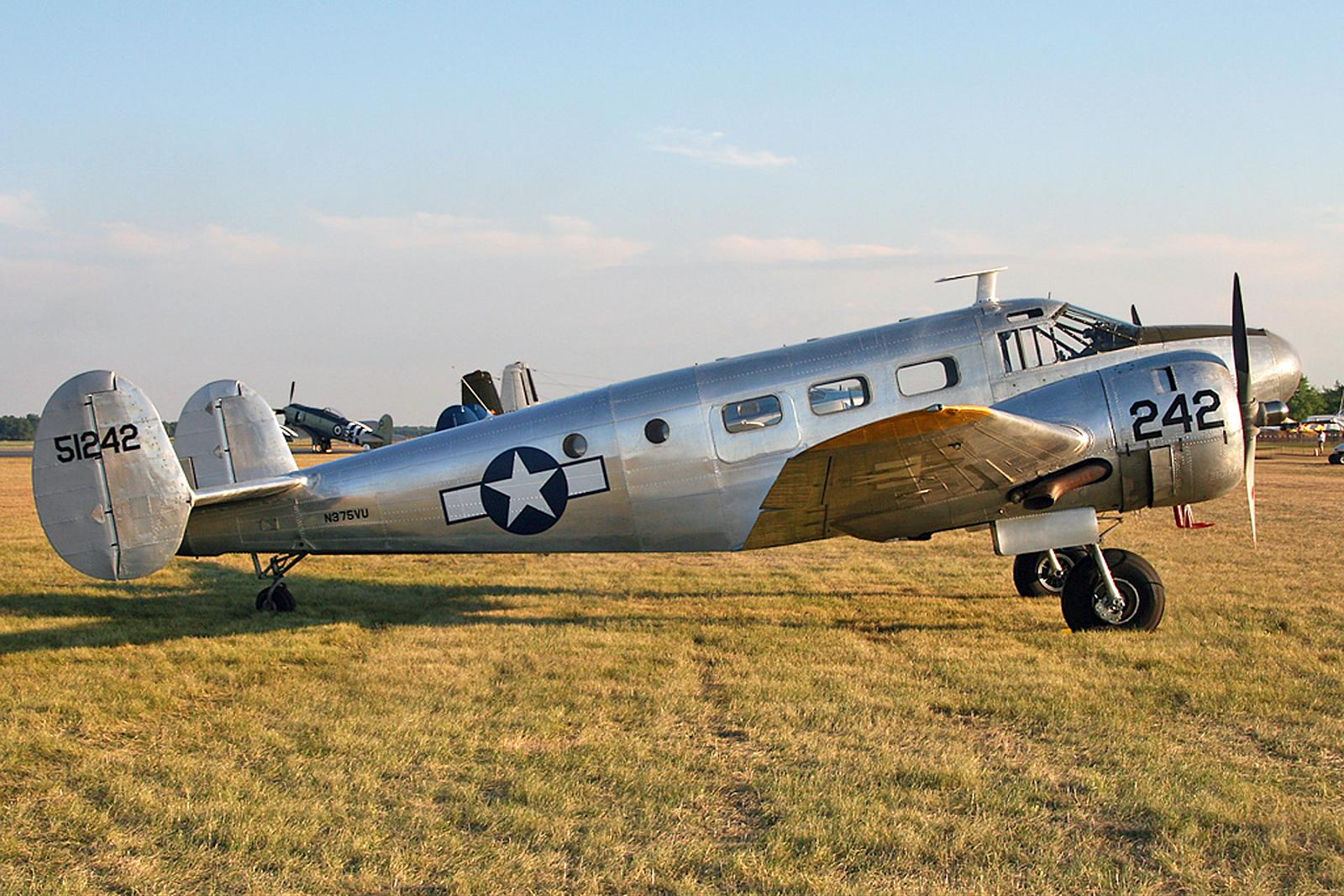
Beech C-45 in United States markings, an example of the Expeditor II used by 755 NAS

755 Naval Air Squadron reformed at RNAS Colombo Racecourse (HMS Bherunda), in the Cinnamon Gardens, Colombo, Sri Lanka, on 24 March 1945, as a Communications Squadron. It was equipped with Beech Expeditor C.2, a twin-engined trainer, transport and utility aircraft, which it operated in the communications role throughout its existence. 755 Naval Air Squadron disbanded at RNAS Colombo Racecourse on 31 October 1945.

== Aircraft operated ==
755 Naval Air Squadron has operated a number of different aircraft types, including:

- Hawker Osprey fighter and reconnaissance aircraft (May 1939 - January 1941)
- Blackburn Shark Mk II torpedo bomber (May 1939 - October 1943)
- Percival Proctor IA deck landing and radio trainer aircraft (November 1939 - October 1944)
- Blackburn Skua dive bomber and fighter aircraft (January 1940)
- Blackburn Roc fighter aircraft (May 1940 - September 1940)
- Westland Lysander TT Mk.III target tug aircraft (July 1941 - October 1944)
- Westland Lysander Mk.IIIA army co-operation and liaison aircraft (July 1941 - October 1944)
- Percival Proctor IIA radio trainer aircraft (October 1941 - October 1944)
- Percival Proctor II radio trainer aircraft (April 1942 - January 1944)
- de Havilland Tiger Moth trainer aircraft (September 1943 - December 1943)
- Curtiss Seamew I observation floatplane (October 1943 - October 1944)
- Percival Proctor III radio trainer aircraft (November 1943 - March 1944)
- Beech Expeditor II trainer, transport and utility aircraft (March 1945 - October 1945)

== Naval air stations ==
755 Naval Air Squadron operated from a number of naval air stations of the Royal Navy, in England, the Channel Islands and overseas in Sri Lanka:

1939 - 1944

- Royal Naval Air Station Worthy Down (HMS Kestrel), Hampshire, (24 May 1939 - 31 October 1944)
  - Royal Naval Air Station Jersey, Jersey, (detachment 11 March 1940 - 31 May 1940)
- disbanded - (31 October 1944)

1945

- Royal Naval Air Station Colombo Racecourse (HMS Berhunda), Ceylon, (24 March 1945 - 31 October 1945)
- disbanded - (31 October 1945)

== Commanding officers ==
List of commanding officers of 755 Naval Air Squadron with date of appointment:

1939 - 1944

- Lieutenant Commander R.A. Peyton RN, from 24 May 1939
- Lieutenant Commander O.S. Stevinson, RN, from 17 July 1939
- Lieutenant Commander H.P. Sears, RN, from 11 March 1940
- Lieutenant Commander(A) T. Coates, RNVR, from 6 March 1941
- Lieutenant Commander(A) R.H. Ovey, RNVR, from 1 December 1941
- Lieutenant Commander(A) J.J. Dykes, RNVR, from 15 January 1942
- Lieutenant Commander(A) W.H.C. Blake, RNVR, from 10 June 1944
- disbanded - 31 October 1944

1945

- Lieutenant Commander(A) J.G.O. Sullivan, RNZNVR, from 24 March 1945
- Lieutenant Commander(A) R.J. Griffith, RNZNVR, from 4 September 1945
- disbanded - 31 October 1945

Note: Abbreviation (A) signifies Air Branch of the RN or RNVR.
