= HM Prison Haverigg =

Prison in Cumbria, England

HMP Haverigg
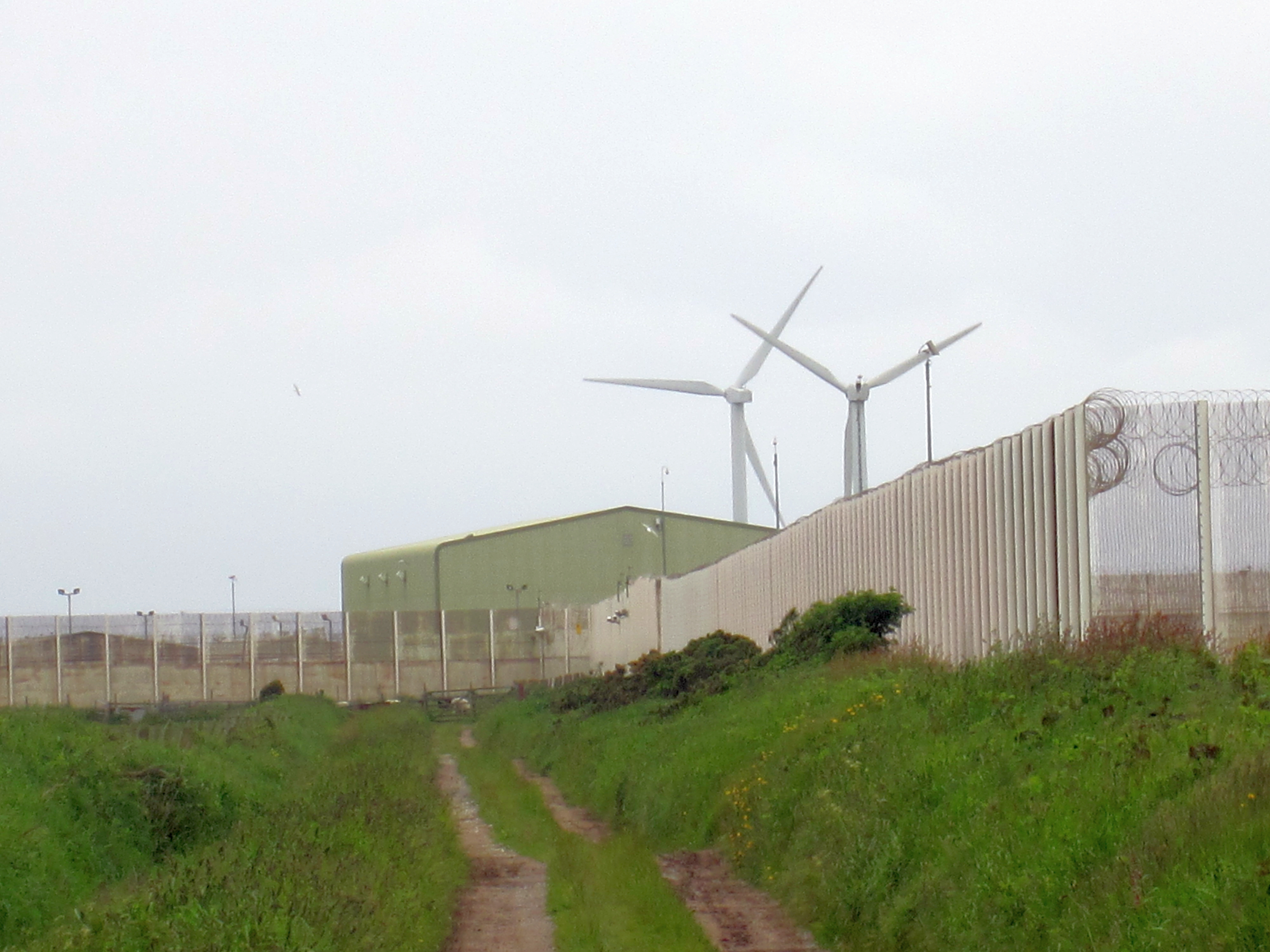
- Haverigg Prison Wall

- Location in Copeland Borough Location in Cumbria
- Location: Haverigg, Cumbria, England; 54.2004°N 3.3136°W
- Security class: Adult Male/Category D
- Population: 490 (max) (March 2022)
- Opened: 1967
- Managed by: HM Prison Services
- Governor: Adam Connolley
- Website: Haverigg at justice.gov.uk

HM Prison Haverigg is a Category D men's prison, located in the village of Haverigg (near Millom) in Cumbria, and historically in Cumberland, England. The prison is situated just outside the Lake District National Park.

Haverigg Prison is operated by His Majesty's Prison Service, and is part of the Cumbria and Lancashire prison group.

== History ==
Haverigg Prison is built on the site of an old RAF airfield training centre, and was opened in 1967. While some of the prison's workshops and offices are housed in buildings from that era, most of HMP Haverigg has been extensively modernised over the years.

In January 1999, HMP Haverigg was awarded a prestigious Charter Mark, with particular attention paid to the "excellent service" of the prison's Physical Education department and the Library. However, just a month later nearly 200 prisoners were involved in a riot at HMP Haverigg. The inmates smashed windows and started fires, costing £1 million worth of damage at the prison.

In June 2003, the Independent Monitoring Board issued a report stating that cost-cutting measures taken at HMP Haverigg had caused serious problems for staff and prisoners. The report also stated that the board had concerns about particular prisoners, claiming that not all inmates did well with the billet style accommodation and relative freedom at the jail. However, the report did also praise HMP Haverigg for its rehabilitation techniques with prisoners.

In August 2005, a prisoner escaped while working in a supervised group of inmates at Roudsea nature reserve in Haverthwaite. The prisoner (who was serving a 15-year sentence for manslaughter) was recaptured by police three days later. Weeks later another prisoner escaped from HMP Haverigg by scaling the prison fence. The inmate who had been jailed for drugs offences was still on the run a month after his escape.

In 2019, the prison was reclassified from a Category C training prison to a Category D open prison.

== The prison today ==
Haverigg Prison accepts inmates suitable for Category D status who are able to participate in full-time employment. Accommodation for prisoners varies from a cellular house block to billets and two Residential Treatment Units.

All prisoners take part in full-time employment and/or training. Workshops include timber manufacturing, construction, plastering, industrial cleaning, and horticulture. Haverigg Prison's gym also provides training related to gym courses and qualifications as well as recreational PE, and was the first to organise an official prison Parkrun, Black Combe Parkrun. Haverigg Prison has a traditional library facility which also includes IT suites and training facilities, self-help and employment advice.

Haverigg Prison's chaplaincy, Healthcare Centre, Probation, and Education departments all offer additional courses and one-to-one sessions (where available) for prisoners with a variety of individual needs. There is also a mental health department offering support for both primary mental health (i.e. anxiety, depression) and secondary mental health (i.e. severe and enduring mental health conditions). They also offer various groups.

There is a visitors' reception centre outside the prison and a visits hall within the Prison. The visiting hall has a tea bar which provides hot and cold food and drinks, and also a small children's play area. The tea bar and play area are staffed by local volunteers.
