= National Youth Advocacy Service =

British legal aid charity

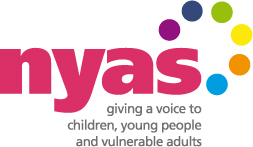
Logo

The National Youth Advocacy Service (NYAS) is a UK children's charity which offers socio-legal advocacy, information, and legal services to children and young people, as well as vulnerable adults. They can represent children and young adults under Rule 16.4 of the Family Proceedings Act. It was founded in 1998.
