= Katukurunda Airport =

Katukurunda Airport SLAF Katukurunda කටුකුරුන්ද ගුවන්තොටුපළ
- IATA: KTY; ICAO: VCCN

Summary
- Airport type: Military / Public
- Owner: Government of Sri Lanka
- Operator: Sri Lanka Air Force
- Location: Kalutara, Sri Lanka
- Elevation AMSL: 3 m / 10 ft
- Coordinates: 06°33′07″N 079°58′43″E

Map
- Location of airport in Sri Lanka

Runways
Direction	Length		Surface
Direction	m	ft	Surface
11/29	1,006	3,301	Bitumen

Katukurunda Airport (Sinhala: කටුකුරුන්ද ගුවන්තොටුපළ Katukurunda Guwanthotupala, IATA: KTY, ICAO: VCCN) is a domestic airport located near the town of Kalutara in Sri Lanka. It is also a military airbase known as Sri Lanka Air Force Katukurunda or SLAF Katukurunda.

The airport is located 2.5 nautical miles (4.6 km) southeast of the town of Kalutara. It is at an elevation of 3 metres (10 ft) and has one runway designated 11/29 with a bitumen surface measuring 1,006 by 46 metres (3,301 ft × 151 ft).

== History ==
Originally established as the Royal Naval Air Station HMS Ukussa, it was reactivated in 1984 by the Sri Lanka Air Force. It has been the venue for many motor races conducted in association with the Air Force Sports Board and with Sports Ministry approval.

Established in 1944 by the Fleet Air Arm of the Royal Navy at its peak it was the largest Royal Naval Air Station, staffed by 300 Officers, 3000 sailors and 100 women from the Women's Royal Naval Service. It serviced more than 100 aircraft at any given time whilst maintaining an aircraft repair yard.

Local civil flying schools provide flight training facilities from the aerodrome.
