= 775 Naval Air Squadron =

Inactive flying squadron of the Royal Navy's Fleet Air Arm

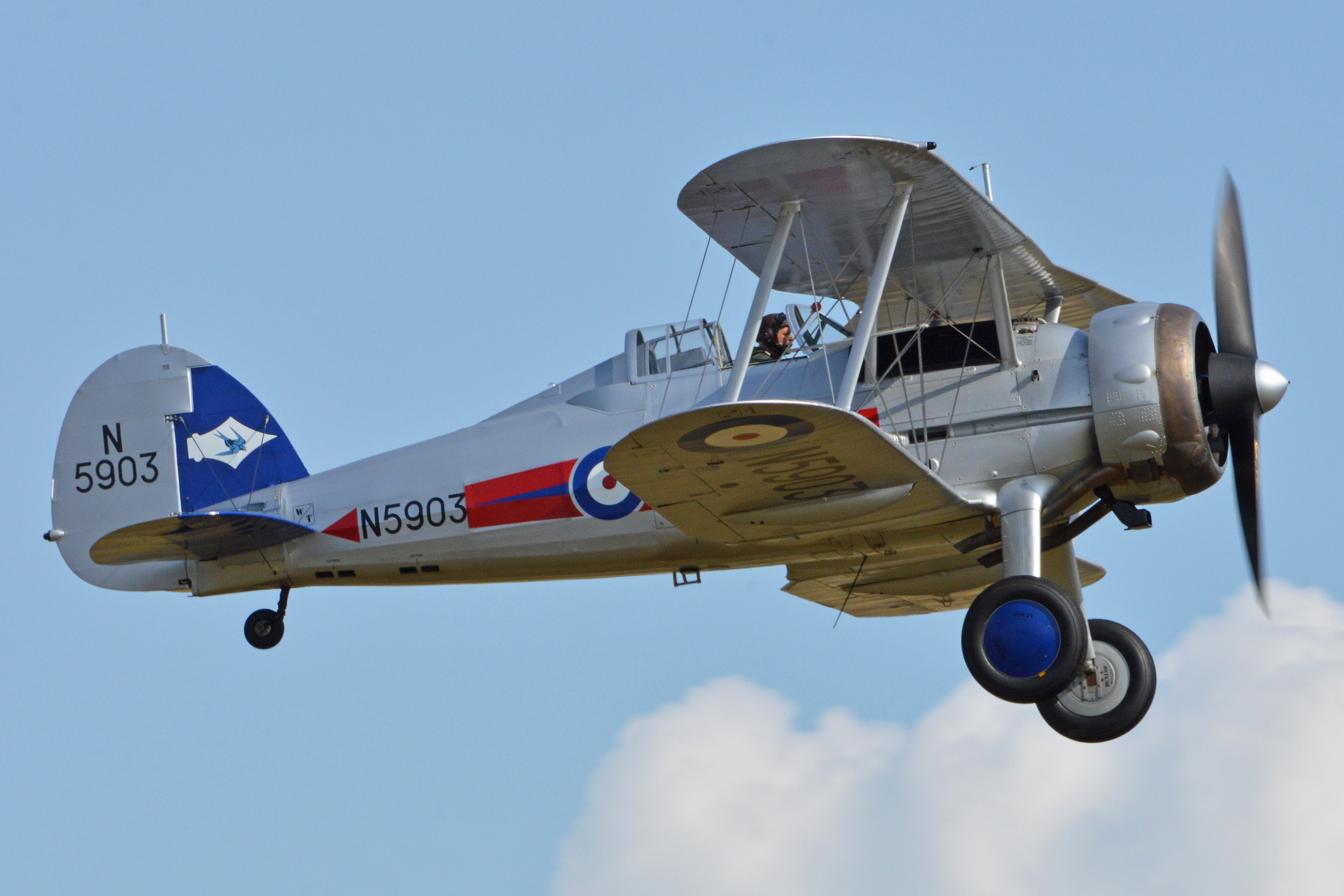
- Gloster Gladiator II, initially built as a Sea Gladiator of the type used by 775 NAS
- Active: 1940–1946
- Disbanded: March 1946
- Country: United Kingdom
- Branch: Royal Navy
- Type: Fleet Air Arm Second Line Squadron
- Role: Fleet Requirements Unit
- Size: Squadron
- Part of: Fleet Air Arm
- Home station: See Naval air stations section for full list.
- Aircraft: See Aircraft operated section for full list.

Insignia
- Identification Markings: single letters

775 Naval Air Squadron (775 NAS) was a Fleet Air Arm (FAA) naval air squadron of the United Kingdom’s Royal Navy (RN) which last disbanded in March 1946. 775 Naval Air Squadron formed at HMS Grebe, RNAS Dekheila, during November 1940, as a Fleet Requirements Unit in support of the Mediterranean Fleet, based at Alexandria, Egypt. Between October 1941 and March 1942 the squadron also included the RN Fighter Flight. It absorbed 728 Naval Air Squadron in July 1943 and moved to RN Air Section Gibraltar at the start of February 1944. The squadron returned to HMS Grebe, RNAS Dekheila during August 1945.

== History ==
=== Fleet Requirements Unit (1940–1946) ===
775 Naval Air Squadron formed on 25 November 1940 as a Fleet Requirements Unit, for the Mediterranean Fleet at Alexandria, at RNAS Dekheila (HMS Grebe), Egypt, the unit also having a Torpedo Bomber Reconnaissance (TBR) training Flight. It was initially equipped with four Blackburn Roc, a naval turret fighter aircraft but for target towing duties and marking, and in 1941 it received seven Fairey Swordfish, a biplane torpedo bomber, two Fairey Fulmar, a British carrier-based reconnaissance and fighter aircraft, two Gloster Sea Gladiator, a biplane fighter aircraft, and also Fairey Albacore, biplane torpedo bomber and de Havilland Queen Bee version of the Tiger Moth. From October 1941 the squadron also contained the RN Fighter Flight's Fairey Fulmar, until 13 March 1942, when this became 889 Naval Air Squadron.

A detachment operated at RAF St Jean, in Palestine, now Israel, in late 1942, and on 4 July 1943, the squadron absorbed 728 Naval Air Squadron. Boulton Paul Defiant TT Mk I, a two-seat night fighter aircraft converted to target tug, were acquired during 1943, and after moving to RN Air Section Gibraltar (HMS Cormorant II), which had lodger facilities at RAF North Front, Gibraltar, on 1 February 1944, Miles Martinet TT.Mk I, a dedicated target tug aircraft, were received. These aircraft were followed up with a few Bristol Beaufighter TF Mk.X, a British torpedo fighter aircraft, Hawker Hurricane Mk.I, a fighter aircraft and Supermarine Seafire Mk Ib and Mk IIc, a navalised version of the Supermarine Spitfire Mk Vc fighter aircraft, before the squadron relocated back to RNAS Dekheila on 5 August 1945. It immediately absorbed an existing Communications Squadron, however around six months later 775 Naval Air Squadron disbanded at RNAS Dekheila (HMS Grebe) in March 1946 while its Communications Flight continued at RN Air Section Aboukir (HMS Nile II), a lodger at RAF Aboukir near Alexandria, Egypt, operating with Airspeed Oxford aircraft, until 15 May.

== Aircraft operated ==
The squadron operated a variety of different aircraft and versions:

- Blackburn Roc fighter aircraft (November 1940 - July 1943)
- Fairey Swordfish I TT torpedo bomber/target tug (May 1941 - June 1945)
- de Havilland Queen Bee target drone/trainer aircraft (August 1941 - April 1943)
- Fairey Fulmar Mk.I reconnaissance/fighter aircraft (September 1941 - April 1942)
- Fairey Albacore torpedo bomber (September 1941 - November 1943)
- Gloster Sea Gladiator fighter aircraft (October 1941 - February 1944)
- Hawker Hurricane Mk.I fighter aircraft (1942)
- de Havilland Tiger Moth trainer aircraft (May 1942 - February 1944)
- Fairey Fulmar Mk.II reconnaissance/fighter aircraft (April 1943 - February 1944)
- Supermarine Seafire Mk Ib fighter aircraft (July 1943 - March 1944)
- Boulton Paul Defiant TT.Mk I target tug (July 1943 - December 1944)
- Fairey Swordfish Il torpedo bomber (November 1943 - February 1944)
- Miles Martinet TT.Mk I target tug (May 1944 - November 1945)
- Bristol Beaufighter TF Mk.X torpedo fighter (May 1944 - November 1945)
- Supermarine Seafire Mk IIc fighter aircraft (August 1944 - November 1945)
- Bristol Blenheim Mk.IV light bomber (May - August 1945)

=== 775 Comms Flight ===
- Airspeed Oxford trainer aircraft (August 1945 - May 1946)

== Naval air stations ==
775 Naval Air Squadron operated from a number of naval air stations of the Royal Navy overseas:

- Royal Naval Air Station Dekheila (HMS Grebe), Alexandria, Egypt, (25 November 1940 - 10 February 1944)
  - RN Aircraft Repair Yard Fayid (HMS Phoenix), Egypt, (TTU aircraft с.24 - 29 March 1942)
  - Royal Air Force St Jean, Mandatory Palestine, (Detachment 12 July 1942 - 2 April 1943)
- RN Air Section Gibraltar, Gibraltar, (10 February 1944 - 5 August 1945)
- Royal Naval Air Station Dekheila (HMS Grebe), Alexandria, Egypt, (5 August 1945 - March 1946)
- disbanded - (March 1946)

=== 775 Comms Flight ===
775 Naval Air Squadron Comms Flight operated from a number of naval air stations of the Royal Navy overseas:

- Royal Naval Air Station Dekheila (HMS Grebe), Alexandria, Egypt, (August 1945 - January 1946)
- Royal Air Force Alexandria/Maryut, Egypt, (January 1946 - February 1946)
- RN Air Section Aboukir (HMS Nile II), Egypt, (February 1946 - May 1946)
- disbanded - (May 1946)

== Commanding officers ==
List of commanding officers of 774 Naval Air Squadron, with date of appointment:

- Not identified, from 25 November 1940
- Lieutenant A.H. Abrams, RN, from 27 July 1941
- Lieutenant Commander(A) H.L. McCulloch, RN, from 27 October 1941
- Lieutenant Commander(A) J.W.G. Wellham, DSO, RN, from 29 November 1942
- Lieutenant Commander(A) J.M. Waddell, RNVR, from 8 December 1942
- Lieutenant Commander(A) J.L. Wordsworth, RNVR, from 24 March 1945
- disbanded March 1946

Note: Abbreviation (A) signifies Air Branch of the RN or RNVR.
