= Westland Widgeon =

Westland Widgeon may refer to:

- Westland Widgeon (fixed wing), the 1924 fixed-wing aircraft type by Westland Aircraft
- Westland Widgeon (helicopter), the 1950s helicopter type by Westland Aircraft
