= 701 Naval Air Squadron =

Inactive flying squadron of the Royal Navy's Fleet Air Arm

701 Naval Air Squadron ~~701 (Catapult) Flight FAA~~
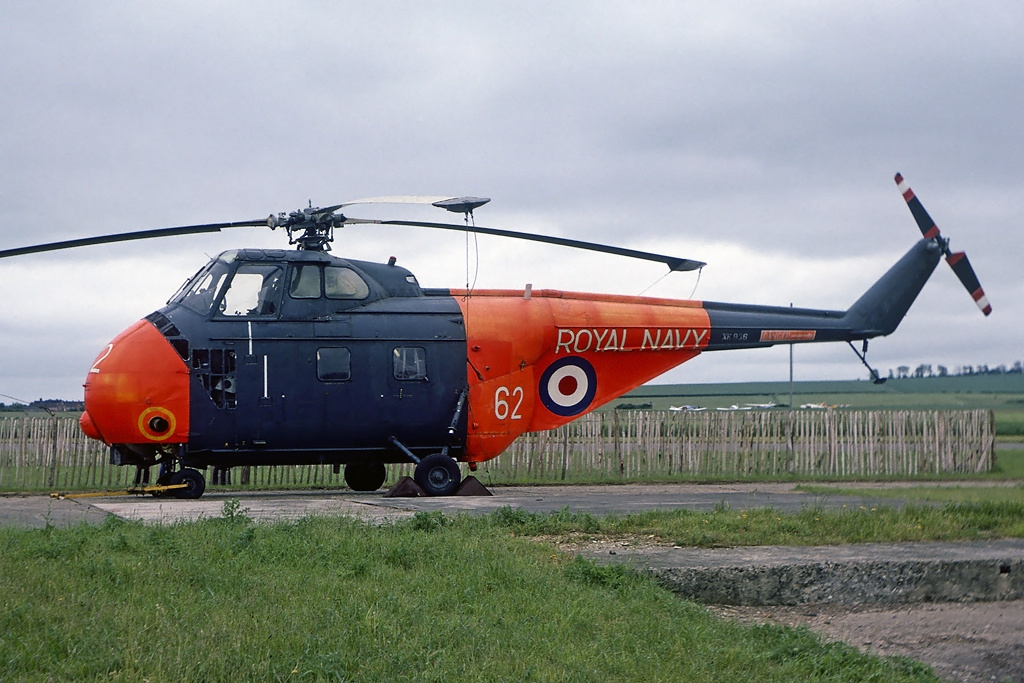
- Westland Whirlwind HAS.7, an example of the type used by 701 NAS
- Active: Royal Air Force; 1936–1939; Royal Navy: 1939–1940; 1940–1941; 1942–1943; 1945–1947; 1957–1958
- Disbanded: 23 September 1958
- Country: United Kingdom
- Branch: Royal Navy
- Type: Fleet Air Arm Second Line Squadron
- Role: Catapult Flights; Special Duties; Anti-submarine Squadron; Communications Unit; Fleet Requirements Unit
- Size: Squadron
- Part of: Fleet Air Arm
- Home station: See Naval air stations section for full list.
- Aircraft: See Aircraft flown section for full list.
- Engagements: World War II
- Battle honours: Norway 1940

Insignia
- Identification Markings: 072-076 (until May 1939); C8A+ (Swordfish); L0A+ (1945 -1947); 708-723 & 990-991 (Whirlwind & Dragonfly)
- Tail Codes: E:O:R:V (Whirlwind & Dragonfly)

701 Naval Air Squadron (701 NAS), otherwise known as 701 Squadron, is an inactive Fleet Air Arm (FAA) naval air squadron of the United Kingdom's Royal Navy (RN), which last disbanded during September 1958 at RNAS Lee-on-Solent where it was a Helicopter Trials, Communications and Fleet Requirements Unit.

It initially formed during July 1936 as a Catapult Flight operating out of Malta and routinely embarking in RN ships such as, HMS Barham, HMS Malaya, HMS Valiant and HMS Warspite. By autumn 1939 it was known as 701 Naval Air Squadron but disbanded in January 1940. It was active twice more during the Second World War, between May 1940 and June 1941 on special duties and then between October 1942 and August 1943 performing anti-submarine patrols. Reforming in April 1945 it was designated a Communications Unit, operating out of Heston until disbanding in 1947. It last reformed as a Fleet Requirements Unit at HMS Daedalus, RNAS Lee-on-Solent, during October 1957.

== History ==
=== Catapult Flights (1936–1940) ===
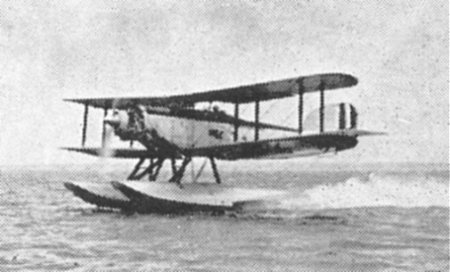
Fairey Seal Floatplane, an example of the type used by the Flight

Formed on 15 July 1936 as No. 701 (Catapult) Flight FAA at RAF Kalafrana, Malta by re-designating No. 444 (Fleet Reconnaissance) Flight FAA; Acquiring some of the latter Flight's aircraft along with other additions 701 (Catapult) Flight operated with Hawker Osprey, the navalised carrier-borne version of the Hawker Hart biplane light bomber, Fairey IIIF reconnaissance biplane, Blackburn Shark, a carrier-borne torpedo bomber, Fairey Seal, a carrier-borne spotter-reconnaissance aircraft and Fairey Swordfish biplane torpedo bomber, operating from warships of the 1st Battle Squadron, serving with both the Home and Mediterranean Fleets.

It was based at the island of Malta in the Mediterranean Sea, operating out of the seaplane operations centre at RAF Kalafrana, with its aircraft routinely embarking in a number of Royal Navy capital ships. By September 1939, it was known as 701 Naval Air Squadron, and operated with five Fairey Swordfish floatplanes. It disbanded into 700 Naval Air Squadron during January 1940.

==== Ships' Flights ====
701 (Catapult) Flight operated a number of ships’ flights between 1936 and 1940 whilst based out of Malta, including the Queen Elizabeth-class battleship HMS Barham between 1936 and 1940, the Admiral-class battlecruiser HMS Hood during 1938, the Queen-Elizabeth-class battleship HMS Malaya between 1937 and 1940, the Revenge-class battleship HMS Royal Oak during 1937, the Queen-Elizabeth-class battleship HMS Valiant during 1936 and between 1939 and 1940, and the Queen-Elizabeth-class battleship HMS Warspite between 1938 and 1940.

=== Special Duties (1940–1941) ===
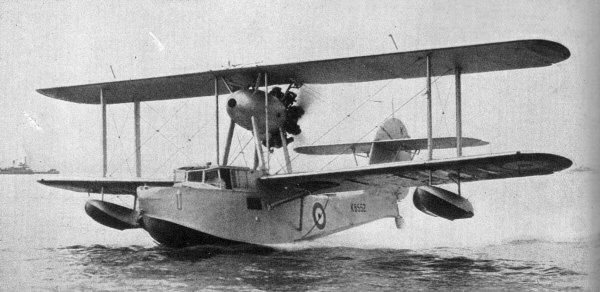
Supermarine Walrus an example of the type used by 701 NAS

701 Naval Air Squadron reformed 7 May 1940, at HMS Merlin, RNAS Donibristle, located in Fife, Scotland, tasked to provide for temporary units formed ashore. 701 Squadron saw action in the Norwegian campaign in mid-1940, and in May six Supermarine Walrus amphibious maritime patrol aircraft of the squadron were flown off the converted to aircraft carrier Courageous-class battlecruiser, HMS Glorious, to support operations off Harstad, in Norway, performing anti-submarine patrols, and undertaking liaison and communications flights plus a small number bombing sorties. In June 1940 the squadron briefly appeared on the aircraft carrier HMS Ark Royal, and the squadron was at Reykjavík in Iceland in October 1940, when they were taken on board the converted from an ocean liner to an aircraft carrier, HMS Argus.

It returned to the United Kingdom, once again embarked in HMS Argus, and was back at RNAS Donibristle from the end of October. In November a detachment started to operate out of Stornoway harbour, Stornoway, the main town of the Western Isles, on the island of Lewis and Harris, in Scotland, although this was very soon taken over by 700 Naval Air Squadron. In March 1941 three aircraft were detached to RAF Sullom Voe in Shetland, to augment the existing 700 Naval Air Squadron Flight. 701 Naval Air Squadron disbanded at RNAS Donibristle during June 1941.

=== Anti-Submarine warfare (1942–1943) ===
On 1 October 1942, 701 Naval Air Squadron was reformed by redesignating 700 Naval Air Squadron, (Levant) Squadron at Beirut, within the French Mandate. It was equipped with six Supermarine Walrus amphibious biplane. Operating within the control of No. 201 Group RAF, it undertook anti-submarine duties. Reports of U-boat activity in the area between Turkey and Cyprus saw a detachment from 701 NAS join No. 235 Wing RAF and was based at Latakia in French mandate territory. On 15 August 1943, 701 Naval Air Squadron disbanded at Beirut.

By July 1943, the squadron was attached to No. 201 Group RAF for the invasion of Sicily (Operation Husky).

=== Communications Unit (1945–1947) ===
701 Naval Air Squadron reformed at Heston Aerodrome, just outside London, on 18 April 1945, taking over 'B' Flight of 781 Naval Air Squadron. Tasked with communication duties, it was equipped with various aircraft, operating with de Havilland Dominie, a 6–8 passenger short-haul biplane airliner, Airspeed Oxford, a twin-engine monoplane training aircraft and Beech Traveller, an American utility aircraft. It had been operating out of Heathrow Aerodrome, which was owned by the Fairey Aviation Company, but was controlled by RNAS Lee-on-Solent and mainly ferried passengers in and out of London. Aside from transport duty, the squadron also had Supermarine Seafire, a navalised version of the Supermarine Spitfire fighter aircraft, enabling flying practice for desk bound pilots. In January 1947, 701 Naval Air Squadron disbanded at Heston.

=== Fleet Requirements Unit (1957–1958) ===
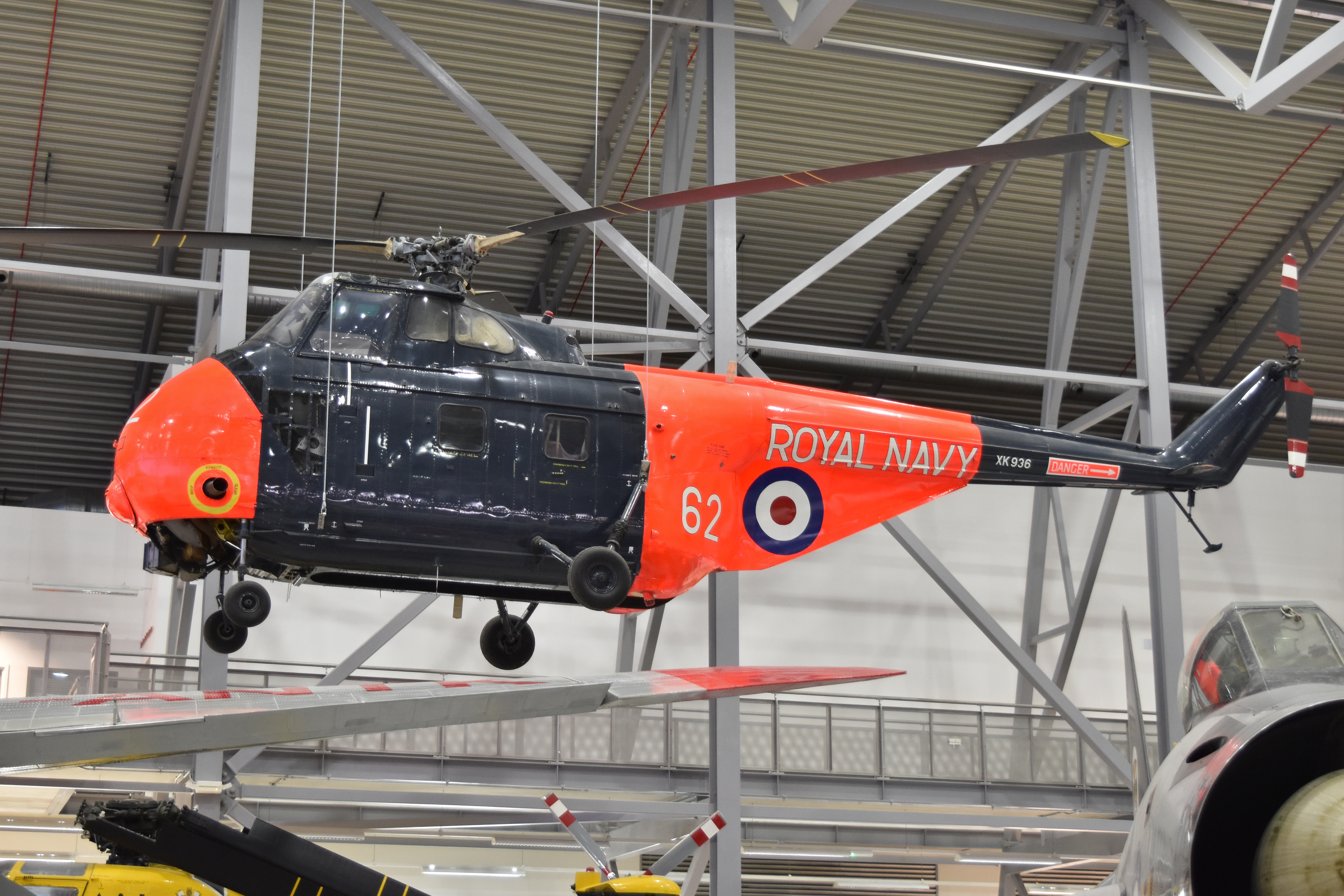
Westland Whirlwind HAS.7

701 Naval Air Squadron reformed in October 1957, at RNAS Lee-on-Solent, as a Helicopter Fleet Requirements Unit. It was equipped with Westland Whirlwind utility helicopter and Westland Dragonfly rescue or communications helicopter. The unit was tasked with operating detached Flights from fleet aircraft carriers on search and rescue duties, and later 701 NAS operated the Ships' Flights of the ocean survey ship HMS Vidal and the ice patrol ship HMS Protector (A173). The squadron acquired the helicopter trials role from 705 Naval Air Squadron and its role became the Helicopter Trials, Communications and FRU. 701 Naval Air Squadron disbanded during September 1958. The Helicopter Trials being picked up by 700 Naval Air Squadron, the training element moved to 705 Naval Air Squadron, the Fleet Requirements Unit tasks to Airwork Services, at Hurn, and the Flights became the ‘Ship's Flights’ of their respective ships.

== Aircraft flown ==
The squadron operated a variety of different aircraft and versions:

1936 - 1940

- Hawker Osprey FP fighter and reconnaissance floatplane (July – November 1936)
- Fairey Swordfish I SP seaplane torpedo bomber (September 1936 – January 1940)
- Fairey Seal II FP Spotter-reconnaissance floatplane (November 1936 – February 1938)
- Blackburn Shark FP torpedo-spotter-reconnaissance floatplane (February – August 1937)

1940 - 1941, 1942 - 1943

- Supermarine Walrus amphibious maritime patrol aircraft (May 1940 – June 1941, August 1942 – August 1943)

1945 - 1947

- Beechcraft Expediter C.I trainer, transport and utility aircraft (April – August 1945)
- Airspeed Oxford training aircraft (April 1945 – January 1947)
- de Havilland Tiger Moth II biplane trainer (April 1945 – February 1946)
- Beechcraft Traveller I utility aircraft (April – September 1945)
- Avro Anson C.X multirole training aircraft (August 1945)
- Supermarine Seafire F Mk.XVII fighter aircraft (September – November 1945)
- Supermarine Seafire F Mk.XV fighter aircraft (March – July 1946)
- de Havilland Dominie Mk I short-haul airliner (March 1946 – January 1947)
- North American Harvard III advanced trainer aircraft (March – April 1946)
- Beechcraft Expediter C.II trainer, transport and utility aircraft (March 1946)

1957 - 1958

- Westland Whirlwind HAR.3 search and rescue helicopter (October 1957 – September 1958)
- Westland Dragonfly HR.5 air-sea search and rescue helicopter (November 1957 – September 1958)
- Westland Whirlwind HAS.22 anti-submarine warfare helicopter (November 1957 – April 1958)
- Westland Whirlwind HAS.7 anti-submarine warfare helicopter (November 1957 – September 1958)
- Westland Whirlwind HAR.1 search and rescue helicopter (July – September 1958)

== Battle honours ==
The battle honours awarded to 701 Naval Air Squadron are:

- Norway 1940

== Naval air stations and aircraft carriers ==
701 Naval Air Squadron operated from a number of naval air stations of the Royal Navy, both in the UK and overseas, a number of Royal Navy aircraft carriers and other air bases:

1936 - 1940

- Royal Air Force Kalafrana, Malta, (15 July 1936)
- disbanded (21 January 1940)

1940 - 1941

- Royal Naval Air Station Donibristle (HMS Merlin), Fife, (7 May 1940)
- HMS Glorious (9 May 1940)
- Harstad, Norway, (18 May 1940)
  - HMS Ark Royal (7 June 1940)
- Royal Naval Air Station Hatston (HMS Sparrowhawk), Mainland, Orkney, (14 June 1940)
- Royal Naval Air Station Donibristle (HMS Merlin), Fife, (16 June 1940)
- HMS Argus (23 June 1940)
- Reykjavík, Iceland, (1 July 1940)
- HMS Argus (17 October 1940)
- Royal Naval Air Station Donibristle (HMS Merlin), Fife, (26 October 1940)
  - Royal Air Force Stornoway, Lewis and Harris, Outer Hebrides, (Detachment six aircraft 6 November 1940 – absorbed by 700 Naval Air Squadron 11 November 1940)
  - Royal Air Force Hooton Park, Cheshire, (Detachment three aircraft 13–22 March 1941)
  - Royal Air Force Sullom Voe, Shetland Isles, (Detachment three aircraft 13 March – 13 April 1941)
- disbanded (8 June 1941)

1942 - 1943

- Royal Air Force Beirut, Lebanon, (1 October 1942)
  - Latakia, Syria, (Detachment 1 October 1942 – February 1943)
- Royal Air Force St Jean, Acre, Israel, (April 1943)
- Royal Naval Air Station Dekheila (HMS Grebe), Alexandria, Egypt, (12 June 1943)
- Royal Air Force Beirut, Lebanon, (13 July 1943)
- disbanded (15 August 1943)

1945 - 1947

- Heston, Middlesex, (18 April 1945)
- disbanded 13 January 1947

1957 - 1958

- Royal Naval Air Station Lee-on-Solent (HMS Daedalus), Hampshire, (31 October 1957)
  - De Kooy, Netherlands, (Detachment two aircraft 28 June – 3 July 1958)
  - Royal Naval Air Station Portland (HMS Osprey), Dorset, (Detachment 17–20 September 1958)
- disbanded (23 September 1958)

=== 701A Flight ===
- HMS Eagle (31 October 1957 - 27 November 1957)
- Royal Naval Air Station Lee-on-Solent (HMS Daedalus), Hampshire, (27 November 1957 - 27 January 1948)
- HMS Eagle (27 January 1958 - 24 March 1958)
- Royal Naval Air Station Lee-on-Solent (HMS Daedalus), Hampshire, (24 March 1958 - 20 May 1958)
- HMS Eagle (20 May 1958; became Ship's Flight 20 September 1958)

=== 701B Flight ===
- HMS Ark Royal (27 January 1958 - 5 July 1948)
- Royal Naval Air Station Lee-on-Solent (HMS Daedalus), Hampshire, (5 July 1958)
- disbanded - (5 July 1958)

=== 701C Flight ===
- HMS Albion (31 October 1957 - 25 November 1947)
- Royal Naval Air Station Lee-on-Solent (HMS Daedalus), Hampshire, (25 November 1957 - 3 February 1958)
- HMS Victorious (3 February 1958 - 8 February 1958)
- Royal Naval Air Station Lee-on-Solent (HMS Daedalus), Hampshire, (8 February 1958 - 15 February 1958)
- HMS Victorious (15 February 1958 - 26 February 1958)
- Royal Naval Air Station Lee-on-Solent (HMS Daedalus), Hampshire, (26 February 1958 - 28 May 1958)
- HMS Victorious (28 May 1958 - 15 June 1958)
- Royal Naval Air Station Lee-on-Solent (HMS Daedalus), Hampshire, (15 June 1958 - 7 July 1958)
- HMS Albion (7 July 1958, became Ship's Flight 20 September 1958)

=== 701D Flight ===
- HMS Bulwark (27 November 1957 - 13 December 1957)
- Royal Naval Air Station Lee-on-Solent (HMS Daedalus), Hampshire, (13 December 1957 - 20 September 1958)
- disbanded - (20 September 1958)

=== 701P Flight ===
- Royal Naval Air Station Lee-on-Solent (HMS Daedalus), Hampshire, (21 July 1958 - 20 September 1958)
- HMS Protector (became Ship's Flight 20 September 1958)

=== 701V Flight ===
- Royal Naval Air Station Lee-on-Solent (HMS Daedalus), Hampshire / HMS Vidal (1 April 1958 became Ship's Flight 20 September 1958)

== Commanding officers ==
List of commanding officers of 701 Naval Air Squadron, with date of appointment:

1936 - 1940

- Lieutenant Commander A.C.G. Ermen RN, (Flight Lieutenant, RAF), from 15 July 1936
- not identified, from April 1937
- Lieutenant E.R.C. Morris RN, (Flight Lieutenant, RAF), from 8 April 1938
- Lieutenant M.C. Hoskin RN, (Flight Lieutenant, RAF), from 1 September 1938
- Lieutenant Commander W.L.M. Brown, RN, from 24 May 1939
- disbanded – 21 January 1940

1940 - 1941

- Lieutenant H.H. Bracken, RN, from 8 May 1940
- Lieutenant Commander M.A. Everett, RN, from 14 March 1941
- disbanded – 8 June 1941

1942 - 1943

- Lieutenant P.C. Chorley, RN, from 5 October 1942
- disbanded – 15 August 1943

1945 - 1947

- Lieutenant Commander(A) A.B. Cunningham, RNVR, from 18 April 1945
- Lieutenant(A) J. Lawson, RNVR, from 10 December 1945
- Lieutenant(A) R.H. Billson, RNVR, 31 January 1946
- Lieutenant(A) H.A. Monk DSM, RN, 21 March 1946
- disbanded – 13 January 1947

1957 - 1958

- Lieutenant Commander J.S. Sproule, RN, 31 October 1957
- Lieutenant Commander R.L. Turnbull MBE, RN, 31 August 1958
- disbanded – 23 September 1958

Note: Abbreviation (A) signifies Air Branch of the RN or RNVR.
