= Westland WS-51 Dragonfly =

Helicopter built by Westland Aircraft

WS-51 Dragonfly
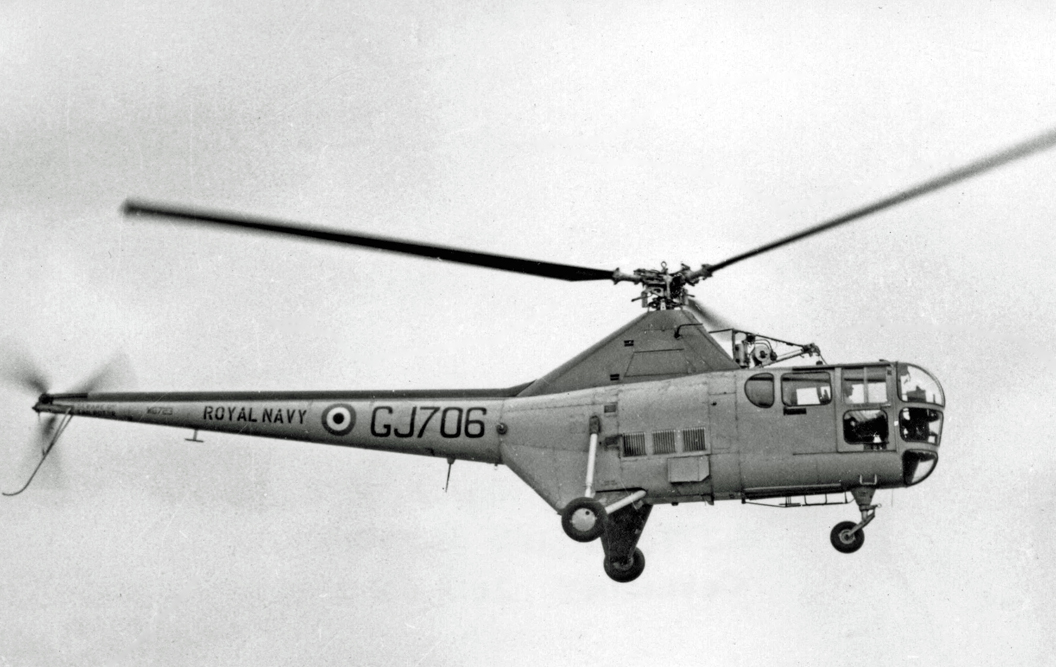
- Dragonfly HR.3 of 705 Naval Air Squadron Royal Navy in 1955

General information
- Type: Rescue or communications helicopter
- National origin: United Kingdom
- Manufacturer: Westland Aircraft
- Status: Retired
- Primary users: Royal Navy Royal Air Force
- Number built: 149

History
- Manufactured: 1949–1954
- Introduction date: 1950
- First flight: 5 October 1948
- Developed from: Sikorsky H-5
- Variant: Westland Widgeon

The Westland WS-51 Dragonfly helicopter was built by Westland Aircraft and is an Anglicised licence-built version of the American Sikorsky S-51.

== Design and development ==
On 19 January 1947 an agreement was signed between Westland Aircraft and Sikorsky to allow a British version of the S-51 to be manufactured under licence in the United Kingdom. These would be powered by the 500 hp Alvis Leonides radial engine. A modified version was also developed by Westland as the Westland Widgeon, but it was commercially unsuccessful.

After delays caused by the need to modify and convert American-drawings to reflect British-sourced items and to replace the engine with a British-built Alvis Leonides 50, the prototype was first flown from Yeovil on 5 October 1948 piloted by Alan Bristow. Only 16 months had elapsed since work had begun on building the prototype registered G-AKTW.

After evaluation initial orders for the British military were placed, thirteen Dragonfly HR.1s for the Royal Navy and three Dragonfly HC.2s for the Royal Air Force.

== Operational history ==
A total of seventy-two Dragonfly helicopters entered service with the Fleet Air Arm of the Royal Navy in the training, air-sea rescue and communications roles. The first unit to be equipped with them was 705 Naval Air Squadron, which is believed to be the first all-helicopter squadron to be formed outside of the United States. The Dragonfly was the first British-built helicopter to be used by the navy and the first to operate from a British ship in trials on RFA Fort Duquesne in 1951. A Dragonfly led the helicopter section of the flypast at the Coronation Review of the Fleet in 1953.

A planned upgrade the navy's Dragonflies to the Widgeon standard with a larger cabin, to be known as the Dragonfly HR.7, was dropped in 1957 due to defence cuts. It was replaced in British service by the Westland Whirlwind, another derivative of a Sikorsky design, in the late 1950s. Dragonflies were used in relief operations in the North Sea flood of 1953 and a number were used by the Royal Air Force for casualty evacuation during the Malayan Emergency.

Fifty-one civilian WS-51s were produced. Examples were used by Pest Control Ltd for crop spraying and others were flown as executive transports by Silver City Airways, Evening Standard Newspapers and Fairey Aviation. Exported aircraft operated in Japan, Belgian Congo, Mexico and Norway.

== Variants ==
Westland/Sikorsky WS-51
Prototype.
Dragonfly HR.1
Air-sea search and rescue helicopter for the Royal Navy powered by a 540 hp (400 kW) Alvis 50 radial piston engine. 13 built, some modified later as HR.5s.
Dragonfly HC.2
Casualty evacuation helicopter for the Royal Air Force similar to the commercial Mark 1A, 2 built and one-conversion from a civil Mark 1A.
Dragonfly HR.3
Air-sea search and rescue helicopter for the Royal Navy. Similar to the Dragonfly HR.1, but fitted with all-metal rotor blades, 71 built some later modified as HR.5s.
Dragonfly HC.4
Casualty evacuation helicopter for the RAF similar to the Dragonfly HR.3 with all-metal rotor blades, 12 built.
Dragonfly HR.5
Air-sea search and rescue helicopter for the Royal Navy with Alvis Leonides 23/1 engine and updated to instruments and avionics. 25 modified from HR.1 and HR.3.
Westland-Sikorsky WS-51 Mk.1A
Civil transport helicopter powered by a 520 hp (388 kW) Alvis Leonides 521/1 radial piston engine, 36 built.
Westland-Sikorsky WS-51 Mk.1B
Civil transport helicopter powered by a 450 hp (336 kW) Pratt & Whitney R-985 Wasp Junior B4 radial piston engine, 15 built.
H.1
(Thai: ฮ.๑) Royal Thai Armed Forces designation for the WS-51.

== Operators ==
=== Military and government operators ===
Ceylon

- Royal Ceylon Air Force - two Mk 1As

Egypt

- Egyptian Air Force - two Mk 1Bs

Iraq

- Royal Iraqi Air Force - three delivered in 1951

Italy

- Italian Air Force - two Mk 1As

Japan

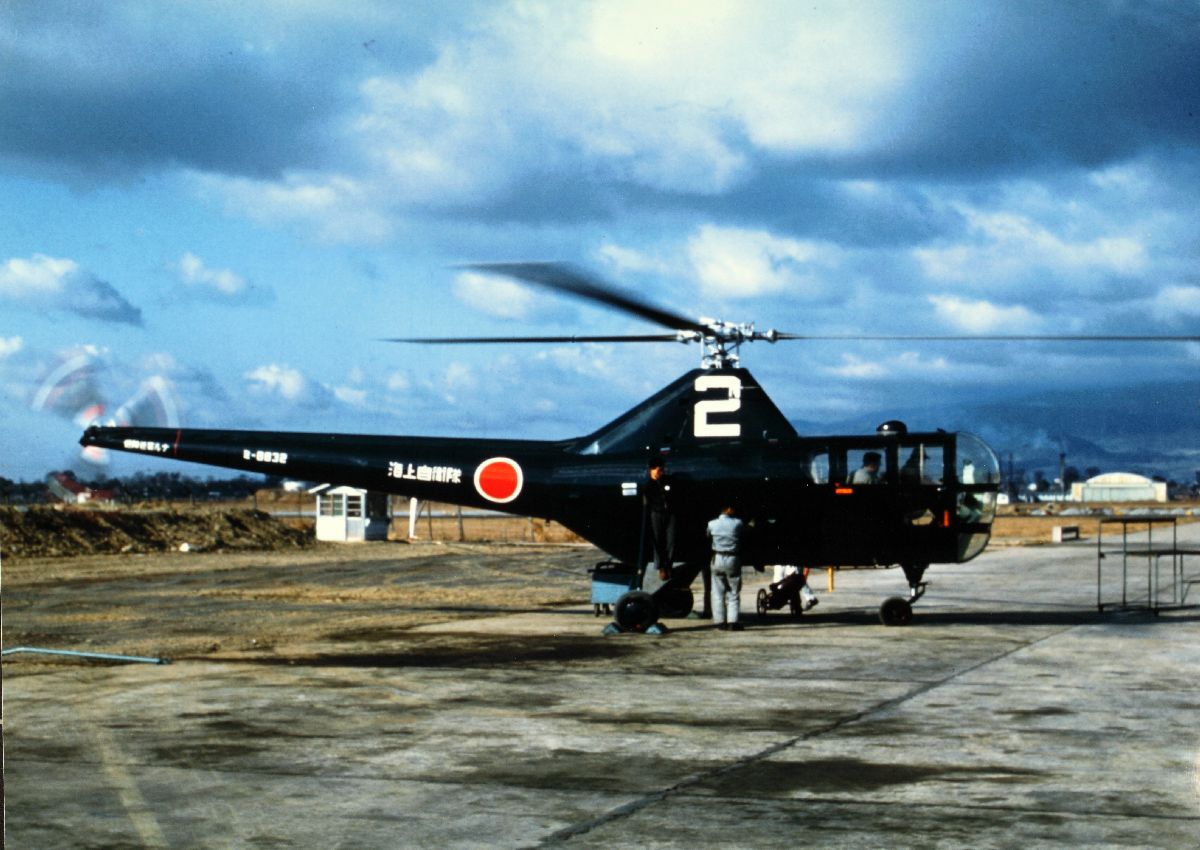
Japan Maritime Self Defence Force S-51

- Japan Maritime Self Defence Force - three Mk 1As, designated S-51

Thailand

- Royal Thai Air Force - three Mk 1As, designated Type 1

United Kingdom

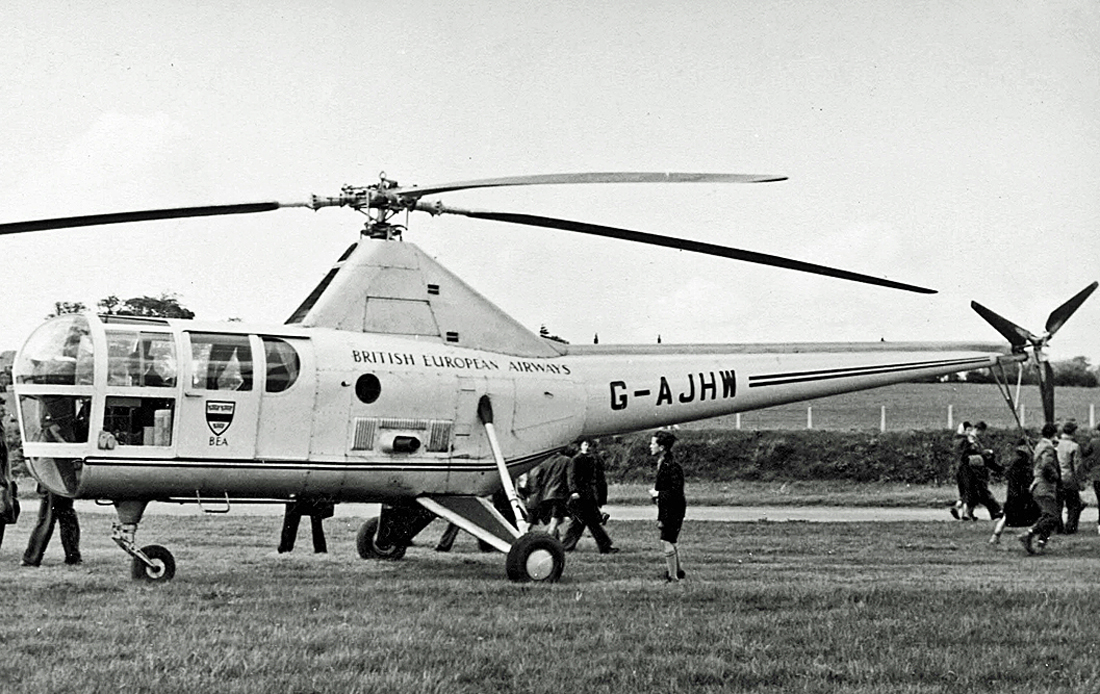
British European Airways Sikorsky S-51 in 1953

- Royal Air Force - 15 HC.2 and HC.4
  - Far East CASEVAC Flight RAF
  - No. 194 Squadron RAF
- Royal Navy
  - Britannia Royal Naval College
  - 700 Naval Air Squadron
  - 701 Naval Air Squadron
  - 705 Naval Air Squadron
  - 727 Naval Air Squadron
  - 728 Naval Air Squadron
  - 744 Naval Air Squadron
  - 771 Naval Air Squadron

Yugoslavia

- SFR Yugoslav Air Force - 10 Mk 1Bs

=== Civil operators ===
Belgium

- Sabena

Brazil

- Record TV

Japan

- Tohoku Electric Power

United Kingdom

- British European Airways
- Silver City Airways
- Fleet Requirements Unit, civilian operated unit, run by Airwork Ltd for the Fleet Air Arm

== Surviving aircraft ==
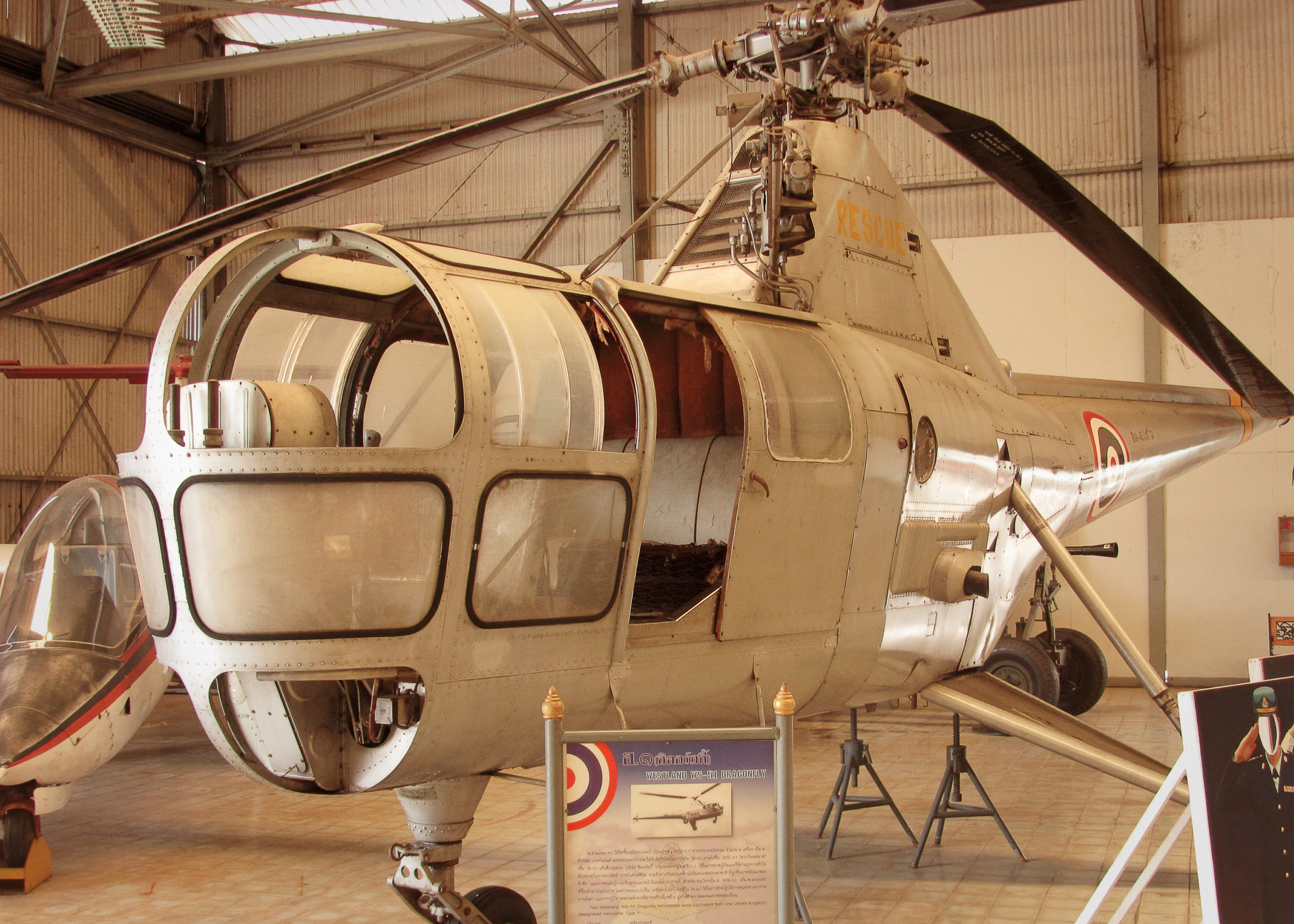
WS-51 Mk.1A in Royal Thai Air Force Museum in December 2014

Australia

- WG725 – HR.3 under restoration at the Fleet Air Arm Museum in Nowra, New South Wales.

Brazil

- PT-HAL (ex G-AMHB) - Civilian WS-51 used by Record TV network and a rescue of Andraus building fire on display at the Museu Eduardo André Matarazzo in Bebedouro, São Paulo.

Japan

- JA7014"Kitakami" used in Tohoku Electric Power at the Misawa Aviation & Science Museum in Misawa, Aomori.

Malta

- VZ962 – HR.1 under restoration at the Malta Aviation Museum in Ta'Qali, Attard.

Netherlands

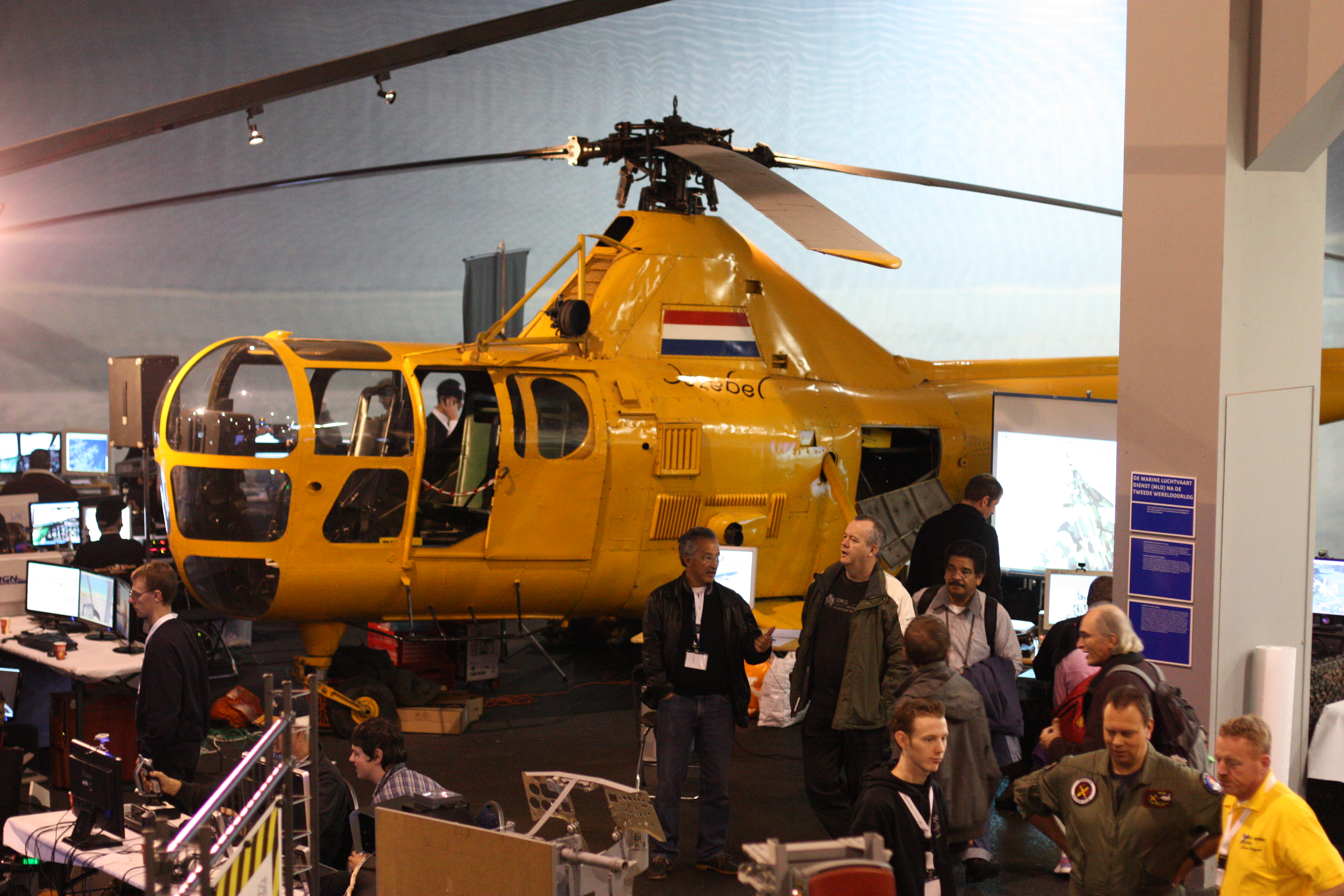
HR.5 on static display at the Aviodrome in Lelystad, Netherlands.

- WG752 – HR.5 on static display at the Aviodrome in Lelystad, Flevoland.

Serbia

- 11503 – Mk.1B on static display at the Aeronautical Museum Belgrade in Surčin, Belgrade.

Sri Lanka

- CH501 – Mk.1A on static display at the Sri Lanka Air Force Museum in Ratmalana, Western Province.

Thailand

- H1-4/96 – Mk.1A on static display at the Royal Thai Air Force Museum in Don Mueang, Bangkok.

United Kingdom

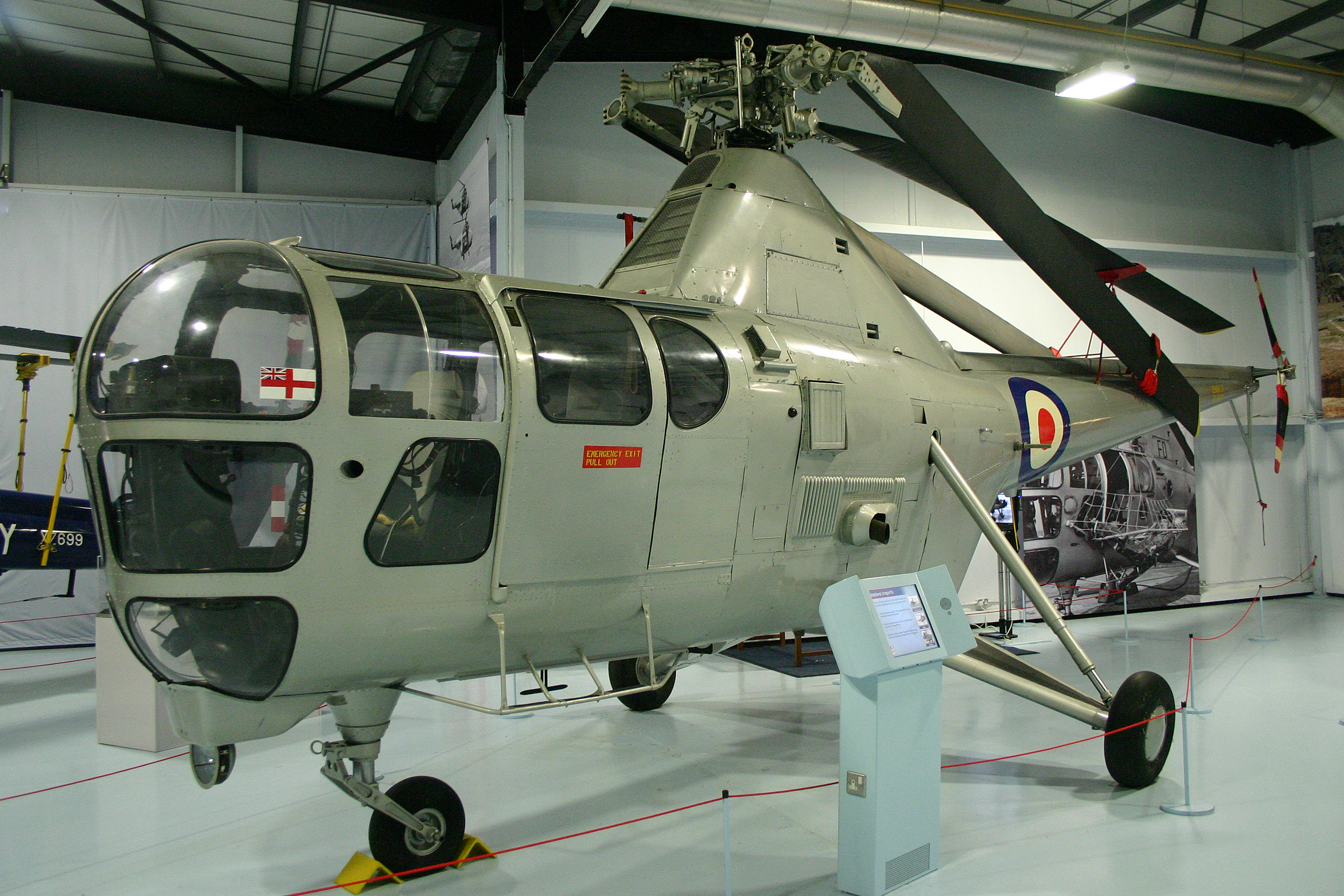
HR.1 at the FAA Museum in Yeovilton, England.

- VX595 – HR.5 on static display at the Fleet Air Arm Museum in Yeovil, Somerset.
- WG719 – HR.5 on static display at The Helicopter Museum in Weston-super-Mare, Somerset.
- WG724 – HR.5 on static display at the North East Land, Sea and Air Museums in Sunderland, Tyne and Wear.
- WG751 – HR.5 on static display at the Chatham Historic Dockyard in Chatham, Kent.
- WH991 – HR.5 on static display at the Yorkshire Air Museum in Elvington, York.
- WN493 – HR.5 on static display at the Fleet Air Arm Museum in Yeovilton, Somerset.
- WN499 – HR.5 under restoration at South Yorkshire Aircraft Museum in Doncaster, South Yorkshire.
- WP495 – HR.5 on static display at Morayvia in Kinloss, Moray.

Venezuela

- HR.3 on static display at the Museo Aeronáutico de Maracay in Maracay, Aragua.

== Specifications (WS-51 Mk.1A) ==
Westland Dragonfly HR3

Data from Jane's all the World's Aircraft 1955–56

General characteristics

- Crew: 1
- Capacity: 3 passengers (useful load 530 lb (240 kg)
- Length: 57 ft 6.5 in (17.54 m) overall
- Fuselage length: 41 ft 1.75 in (12.54 m)
- Height: 12 ft 11.375 in (3.95 m)
- Empty weight: 4,366 lb (1,980 kg) HR Mk.1, (Note: HC Mk.4 4,380 lb (1,990 kg), HC Mk.2 4,450 lb (2,020 kg) including stretcher panniers)
- Gross weight: 5,700 lb (2,585 kg) (Note: HC Mk.2, HC Mk.4 5,870 lb (2,660 kg))
- Max takeoff weight: 5,870 lb (2,663 kg)
- Fuel capacity: 83 imp gal (100 US gal; 380 L) in 2 fuselage tanks
- Powerplant: 1 × Alvis Leonides 521/1 9-cylinder air-cooled radial piston engine (6lb boost), 520 hp (390 kW)
- Main rotor diameter: 49 ft (15 m)
- Main rotor area: 1,885 sq ft (175.1 m^{2}) (Note: Mk. 1A, Mk.1B, HR Mk.3 and HC Mk.4. Rotor diameter (HR Mk.1 and HC Mk.2) 48 ft (15 m), Rotor area (HR Mk.1 and HC Mk.2) 1,809 sq ft (168.1 m^{2}))

Performance

- Maximum speed: 103 mph (166 km/h, 90 kn) at sea level (Note: HR Mk.1, HR Mk.3 95 mph (83 kn; 153 km/h), HC Mk.2, HR Mk.3 88 mph (76 kn; 142 km/h))
- Cruise speed: 85 mph (137 km/h, 74 kn) (Note: HC Mk.2, HC Mk.4 78 mph (68 kn; 126 km/h))
- Range: 300 mi (480 km, 260 nmi) in still air with 20 minutes fuel reserves (Note: HC Mk.2, HC Mk.4 275 mi (239 nmi))
- Service ceiling: 11,000 ft (3,400 m) (Note: HR Mk.1 12,400 ft (3,800 m), HR Mk.3 13,200 ft (4,000 m): Hover ceiling OGE: 6,000 ft (1,800 m); HC Mk.2 4,600 ft (1,400 m): Hover ceiling IGE: 8,000 ft (2,400 m); HR Mk.1 5,600 ft (1,700 m) HR Mk.3 7,000 ft (2,100 m): Best rate of climb HR Mk.1: 800 ft/min (4.1 m/s) at sea level; Best rate of climb HR Mk.3: 1,000 ft/min (5.1 m/s) at sea level; Vertical rate of climb HR Mk.1: 50 ft/min (0.25 m/s) at sea level; Vertical rate of climb HR Mk.3: 200 ft/min (1.0 m/s) at sea level)

== See also ==
- List of aircraft of the Fleet Air Arm
- List of aircraft of the Royal Air Force

Related development

- Sikorsky H-5
- Sikorsky R-4
- Westland Widgeon

Aircraft of comparable role, configuration, and era

- Bristol Sycamore
- Mil Mi-1

Related lists

- List of rotorcraft
