= 728 Naval Air Squadron =

Inactive flying squadron of the Royal Navy's Fleet Air Arm

- Squadron badge
- Active: 1943; 1943–1967
- Disbanded: 31 May 1967
- Country: United Kingdom
- Branch: Royal Navy
- Type: Fleet Air Arm Second Line Squadron
- Role: Fleet Requirements Unit
- Size: Squadron
- Part of: Fleet Air Arm
- Mottos: Docendo discimus (Latin for 'We learn by teaching')
- Aircraft: See Aircraft flown section for full list.

Insignia
- Squadron Badge Description: Blue, upon a base wavy white two bars wavy blue chief a Maltese Cross per pale red and white there on a hurt surmounted by a plate surmounted by a torteau pierced by an arrow point downward in bend sinister feathered black (1953)
- Identification Markings: single letters (all types); M8A+ (1944); 500-599, 801-812 & 901-903 (1946); 570-599, 621-624, 655-659 & 956-961 (January 1956); 860-866 (July 1965)
- Fin Shore Codes: HF (1946 – 1967)

728 Naval Air Squadron (728 NAS), also referred to as 728 Squadron, is an inactive Fleet Air Arm (FAA) naval air squadron of the United Kingdom’s Royal Navy (RN). It was last active s a Fleet Requirements Unit between 1943 and 1967 when it last disbanded at RNAS Hal Far (HMS Falcon), Malta, having flown various aircraft types and marks.

The squadron was initially formed at the beginning of May in 1943, as a Fleet Requirements Unit, at RN Air Section Gibraltar, Gibraltar. It provided detachments at RN Air Section Tafaraoui, in Algeria and later at RAF Oujda in Morocco. Moving to HMS Grebe, RNAS Dekheila, in Egypt, during June. It then merged into 775 Naval Air Squadron the following month.

It reformed in August 1943, again as a Fleet Requirements Unit, at HMS Grebe, moving immediately to RN Air Section Takali, Malta. It provided target towing both for the Royal Navy's Mediterranean Fleet and the British Army, before later providing a detachment to tow targets for the United States Navy at Naples, Italy. The squadron remained on Malta, alternating between the airbases at Ta Kali, Luqa and Hal Far, until disbanding at the latter, in May 1967.

== History ==
=== Fleet Requirements Unit (1943) ===
728 Naval Air Squadron was formed on 1 May 1943 at RN Air Section Gibraltar, the Admiralty having lodger facilities at RAF North Front, Gibraltar, as a Fleet Requirements Unit. The squadron was equipped with Boulton Paul Defiant TT.1, an interceptor aircraft converted for target tug operations and Fairey Swordfish I, a biplane torpedo bomber. Whilst at Gibraltar it operated detachments at RN Air Section Tafaraoui, (lodger facilities at RAF Tafaraoui) in Algeria, from 11 May 1943 to 15 June 1943, with Fairey Swordfish aircraft, and also at RAF Oujda, in Morocco, with Boulton Paul Defiant to provide target towing for an American Anti-Aircraft battery firing range. before moving to RNAS Dekheila (HMS Grebe), Alexandria in Egypt, on 15 June 1943, where it later disbanded, being absorbed by 775 Naval Air Squadron on 4 July 1943.

=== Fleet Requirements Unit (1943–1967) ===
However, just over one month later, on the 14 August, 728 Naval Air Squadron reformed at RNAS Dekheila. The squadron soon moved to Malta and settled at RNAS Hal Far (HMS Falcon), from 5 May 1946, after brief stints at RN Air Section Takali (HMS Goldfinch) and RAF Luqa and just after taking up radar calibration duties from No. 255 Squadron RAF. It was again equipped with Boulton Paul Defiant target tug aircraft, and provided target towing both for the Royal Navy’s Mediterranean Fleet and the British Army, before later providing a detachment to tow targets for the United States Navy at Naples, Italy.

1944 saw the squadron received new aircraft types with Miles Martinet, a target tug aircraft, Bristol Beaufighter, a multirole combat aircraft and Hawker Hurricane single-seat fighter aircraft added to the inventory as the British Pacific Fleet worked up in the Mediterranean. The Boulton Paul Defiant aircraft were withdrawn and replaced by with Bristol Beaufort, a British torpedo bomber, Martin Baltimore, an American light bomber and reconnaissance aircraft, Supermarine Seafire, a navalised version of the Supermarine Spitfire fighter aircraft and de Havilland Mosquito, a twin-engine multirole combat aircraft, during the winter of 1944-45.

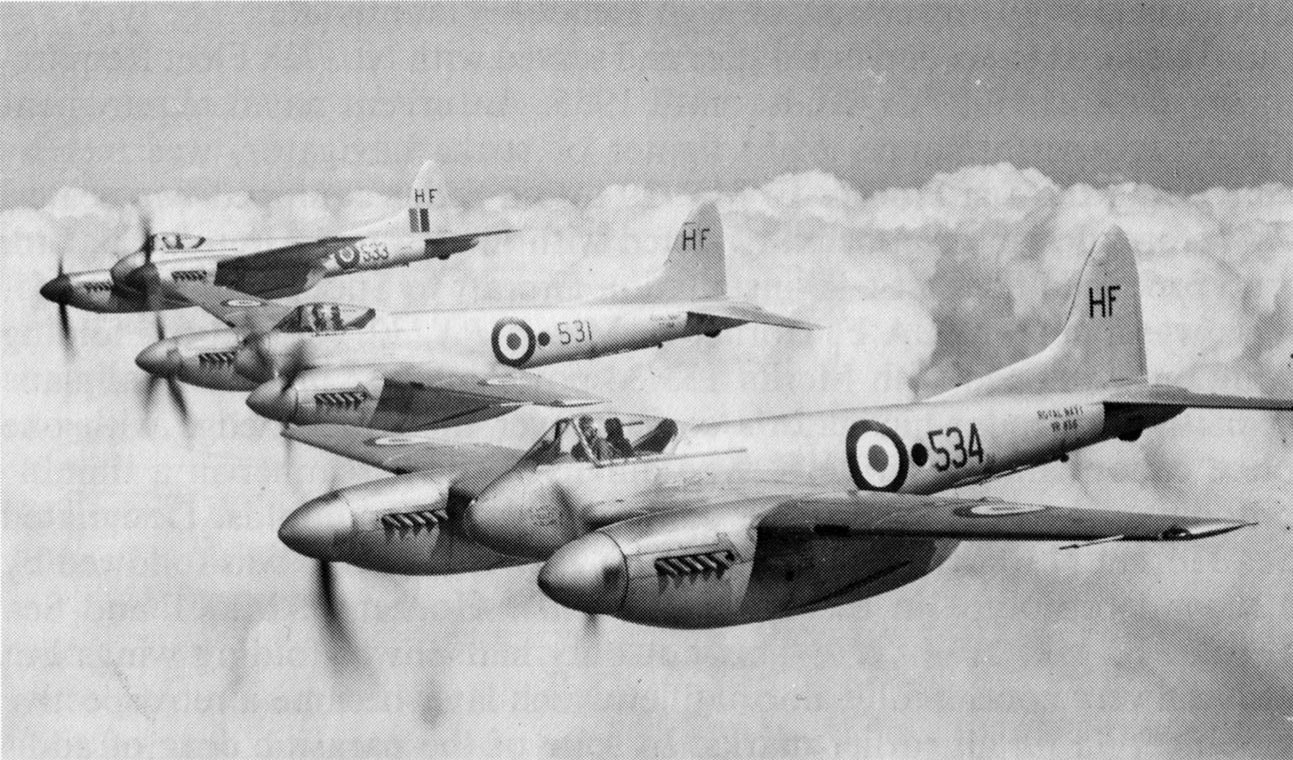
de Havilland Sea Hornet F Mk 20s of No 728 Fleet Requirements Unit, Hal Far, Malta

With the post Second World War reduction of the Mediterranean Fleet, aircraft numbers were also reduced and changes in type took place. In 1949 de Havilland Mosquito TT Mk.39, a RN target towing variant, replaced the Miles Martinet target tug aircraft, later marks of Supermarine Seafire were used for fighter exercises, and Beech Expeditor, an American trainer, transport and utility aircraft, operated passenger and cargo flights. In 1951, de Havilland Sea Vampire jet fighter replaced the Supermarine Seafire and in 1952 the squadron received de Havilland Sea Hornet fighter aircraft and Short Sturgeon target tug aircraft replaced the de Havilland Mosquito TT Mk.39.

Helicopters were added to supplement the squadron's inventory when it started operating the Westland Dragonfly HR.3, air-sea search and rescue helicopter, at the end of 1952. 728B Flight was the identity given to the new RNAS Hal Far SAR (Search and Rescue) flight, this operated utilising the Westland Whirlwind HAR.3, air-sea search and rescue variant, which arrived in 1957. In March 1963, Westland Whirlwind HAS.22, an anti-submarine helicopter, became available for the SAR flight, which was then amalgamated into 728 Naval Air Squadron.

On 31 May 1967 728 Naval Air Squadron disbanded at RNAS Hal Far (HMS Falcon).

== Aircraft flown ==
The squadron operated a variety of different aircraft and versions:

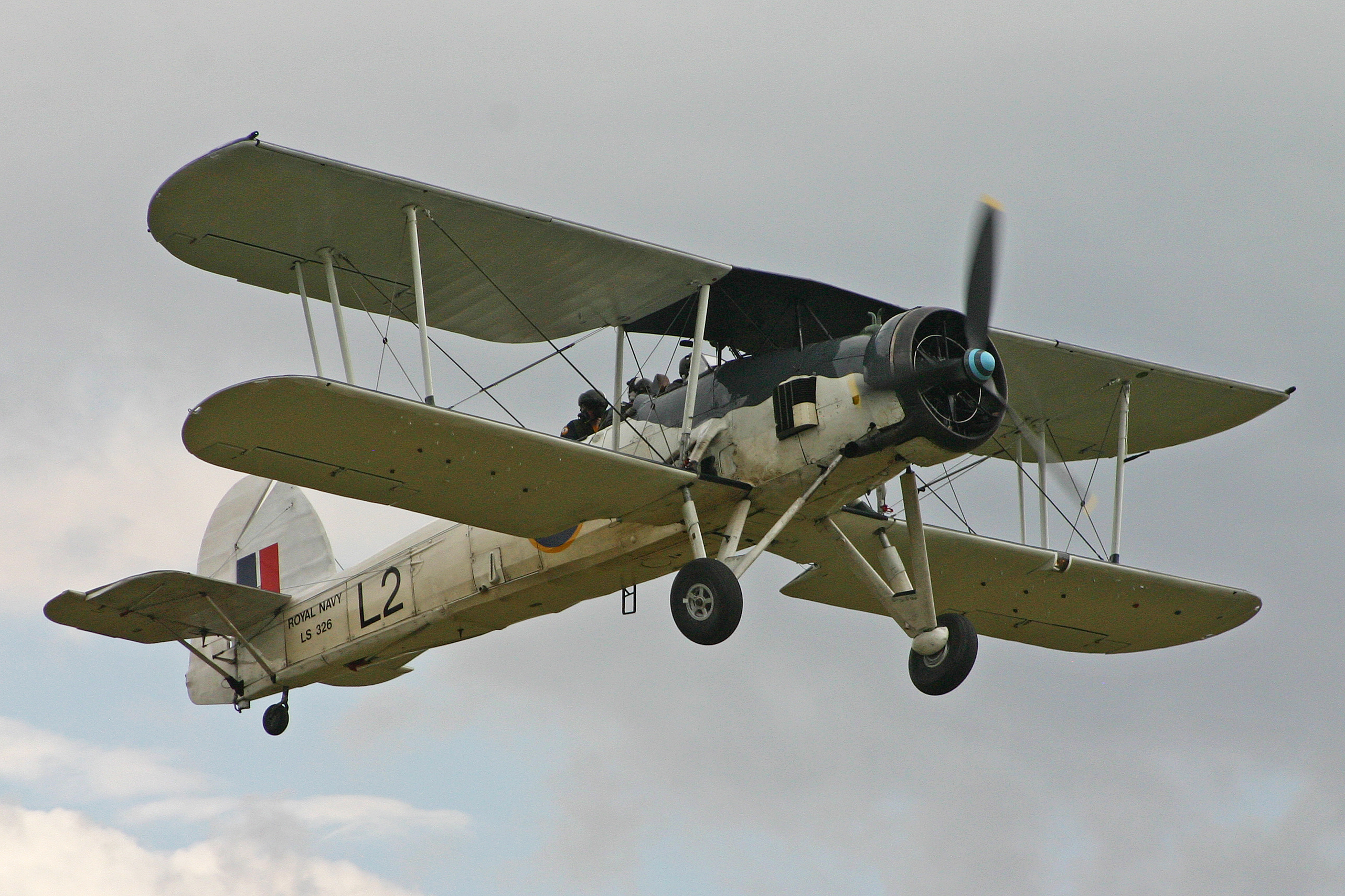
Fairey Swordfish II

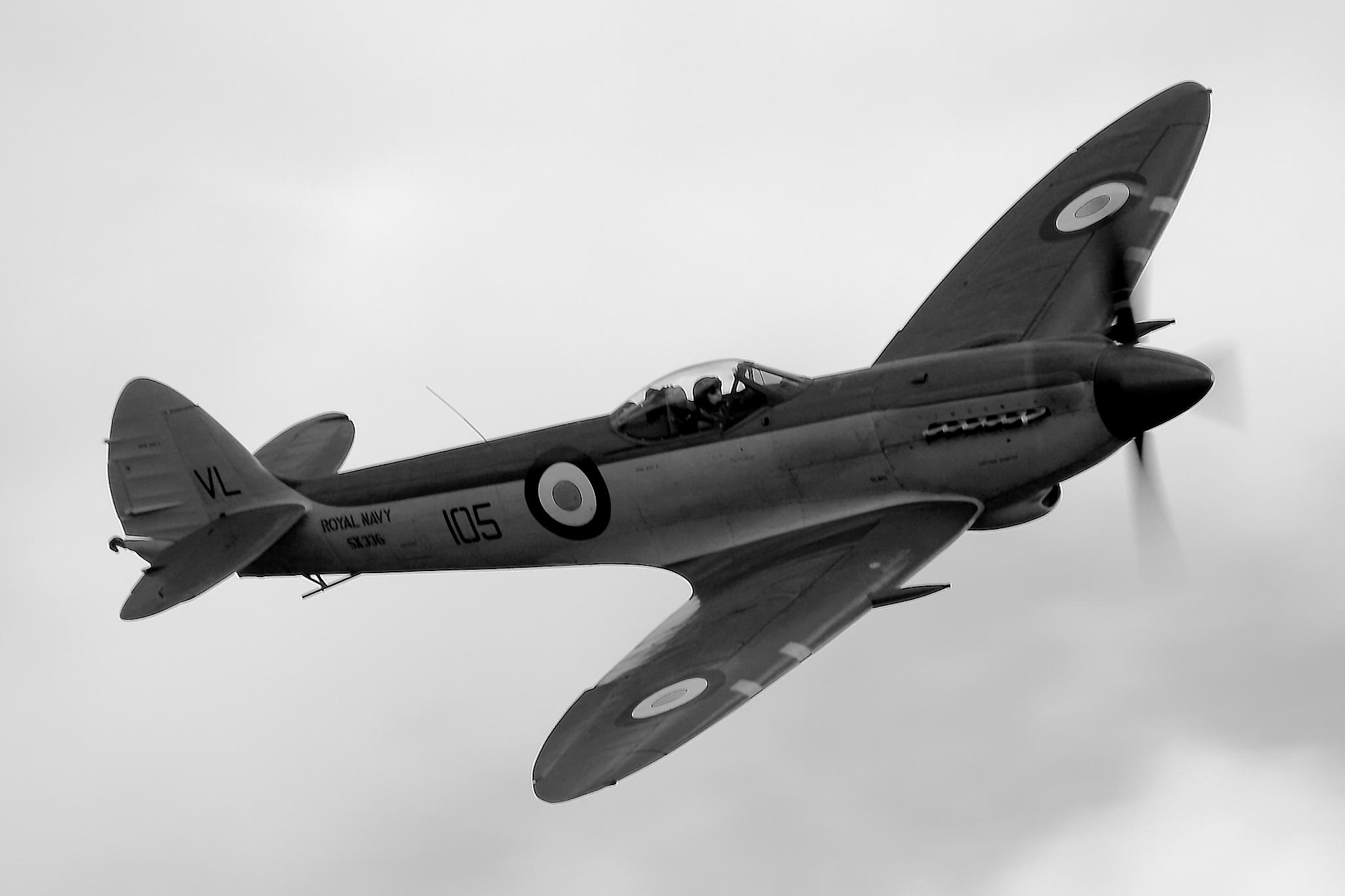
Supermarine Seafire F Mk XVII

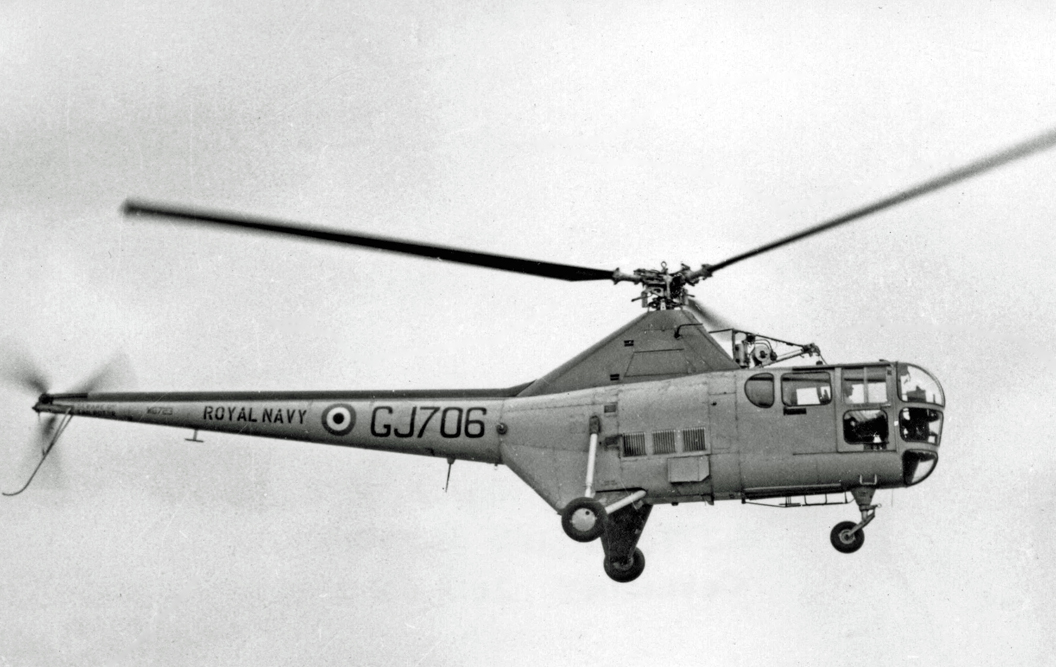
Westland Dragonfly HR.3

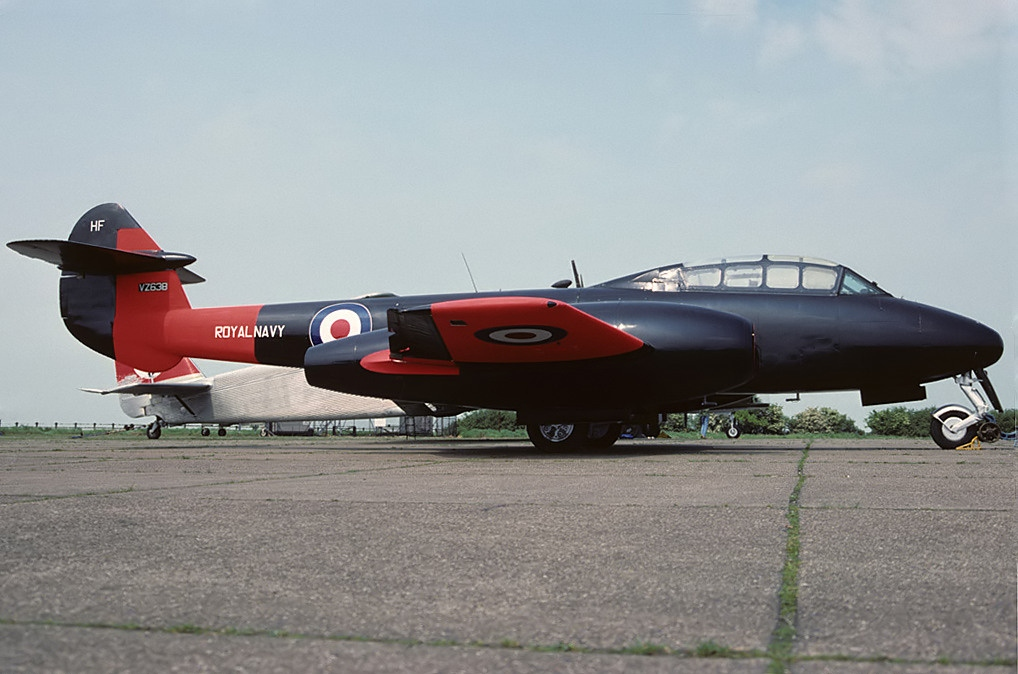
Gloster Meteor T.7

- Boulton Paul Defiant TT.1 target tug (May - July 1943, August 1943 - December 1944)
- Fairey Swordfish I torpedo bomber (May - July 1943)
- Fairey Swordfish II torpedo bomber (February 1944 - January 1945)
- Bristol Beaufighter Mk.IIF night fighter (February 1944 - November 1945)
- Miles Martinet TT.Mk I target tug (March 1944 - December 1949)
- Hawker Hurricane Mk.IIC fighter aircraft (May 1944 - January 1945)
- Bristol Beaufort Mk.Ia torpedo bomber (September 1944 - December 1945)
- Martin Baltimore B. IV light bomber (September 1944 - April 1946)
- Supermarine Seafire L Mk IIC fighter aircraft (October 1944 - January 1946)
- Martin Baltimore B. V light bomber (November 1944 - October 1946)
- Supermarine Seafire F Mk III fighter aircraft (June 1945 - July 1946)
- Avro Anson Mk I multi-role training aircraft (July - November 1945)
- de Havilland Mosquito B Mk.25 bomber (September 1945 - November 1949)
- de Havilland Mosquito T Mk.III trainer aircraft (October 1945 - June 1946)
- Supermarine Walrus amphibious maritime patrol aircraft (October 1945 - February 1946)
- Bristol Beaufighter TT Mk.10 target tug (October 1945 - June 1946)
- Airspeed Oxford I training aircraft (January 1946 - June 1948)
- Supermarine Seafire F Mk XV fighter aircraft (September 1946 - September 1948)
- Supermarine Sea Otter Mk II amphibious air-sea rescue aircraft (August 1947 - December 1952)
- Beech Expeditor II trainer, transport and utility aircraft (March 1948 - June 1959)
- Supermarine Seafire F Mk XVII fighter aircraft (May 1948 - March 1952)
- de Havilland Mosquito PR Mk.XVI photo-reconnaissance aircraft (May 1948 - September 1952)
- North American Harvard III advanced trainer aircraft (August 1948)
- de Havilland Mosquito TT Mk.39 target tug (March 1949 - May 1952)
- Bristol Beaufighter TF Mk.X torpedo fighter aircraft (June - October 1949)
- de Havilland Sea Vampire F.20 jet fighter aircraft (July 1951 - March 1955)
- Short Sturgeon TT.2 target tug (August 1951 - January 1956)
- de Havilland Sea Hornet F.20 fighter aircraft (February 1952 - February 1957)
- Westland Dragonfly HR.3 air-sea search and rescue helicopter (December 1952 - October 1959)
- Short Sturgeon TT.3 target tug (July 1954 - October 1958)
- Gloster Meteor T.7 jet trainer aircraft (February 1955 - April 1967)
- de Havilland Sea Devon C Mk 20 short-haul airliner (August 1956 - April 1963)
- Westland Whirlwind HAR.3 air-sea search and rescue helicopter (June1957 - November 1958)
- Fairey Gannet T.2 anti-submarine warfare trainer aircraft (July - November 1957)
- Gloster Meteor TT.20 jet target tug (March 1958 - April 1967)
- de Havilland Sea Heron C.Mk 20 airliner (March 1963 - March 1967)
- Westland Whirlwind HAS.22 anti-submarine helicopter (March 1963 - August 1965)

== Naval air stations ==
728 Naval Air Squadron operated from a number of overseas naval air stations of the Royal Navy, Royal Air Force stations, and a number of other air bases:

1943

- RN Air Section Gibraltar, Gibraltar, (1 May - 15 June 1943)
  - RN Air Section Tafaraoui, Algeria, (Detachment 11 May - 15 June 1943
  - Royal Air Force Oujda, Morocco, (Detachment 5 - 15 June 1943)
- -transit- (15 - 18 June 1943)
- Royal Naval Air Station Dekheila (HMS Grebe), Alexandria, Egypt, (18 June - 4 July 1943)
- disbanded - (4 July 1943)

1943 - 1967

- Royal Naval Air Station Dekheila (HMS Grebe), Egypt, (14 - 17 August 1943)
- RN Air Section Takali, Malta, (17 August 1943 - 1 January 1946)
  - Capodichino, Italy, (Detachment four aircraft 11 - 20 January 1944)
  - Capodichino, Italy, (Detachment two aircraft 14 - 20 March 1944)
  - RN Air Section Gibraltar, Gibraltar, (Detachment April - May 1944)
  - Pomigliano, Italy, (Detachment August 1945 - April 1946)
  - Ciampino, Italy, (Detachment August 1945 - April 1946)
- Royal Air Force Luqa, Malta, (1 January 1946 - 5 May 1946)
- Royal Naval Air Station Hal Far (HMS Falcon), Malta, (5 May 1946 - 16 September 1954)
- Royal Naval Air Station Takali (HMS Goldfinch), Malta, (16 September - 9 October 1954)
- Royal Naval Air Station Hal Far (HMS Falcon), Malta, (9 October 1954 - 9 March 1962)
  - Royal Air Force Akrotiri, Cyprus, (Detachment three aircraft 6 - 30 June 1960)
  - RN Air Section Gibraltar, Gibraltar, (Detachment three aircraft 12 - 28 January / 8 February - 5 April 1962)
- Royal Naval Air Station Takali (HMS Goldfinch), Malta, (9 March - 11 April 1962)
- Royal Naval Air Station Hal Far (HMS Falcon), Malta, (11 April 1962 - 31 May 1967)
  - Royal Air Force Akrotiri, Cyprus, (Detachment three aircraft 29 March - 21 April 1963)
  - Souda Air Base, Crete, (Detachment three aircraft 1 - 7 October 1963)
  - Royal Air Force Akrotiri, Cyprus, (Detachment three aircraft 11 -15 November 1963)
  - RN Air Section Gibraltar, Gibraltar, (Detachment four aircraft 6 - 13 December 1963 / 7 - 29 May 1964)
  - Royal Air Force Akrotiri, Cyprus, (Detachment three aircraft 22 June - 1 July 1964)
  - RN Air Section Gibraltar, Gibraltar, (Detachment three aircraft 26 June - 5 July 1964)
  - RN Air Section Gibraltar, Gibraltar, (Detachment 12 - 21 September 1965)
- disbanded - (31 May 1967)

== Commanding officers ==
List of commanding officers of 728 Naval Air Squadron with date of appointment:

1943

- Lieutenant(A) E.H. Horn, RNVR, from 1 May 1943
- disbanded - 4 July 1943

1943 - 1967

- Lieutenant P. Snow, RN, from 14 August 1943
- Lieutenant Commander(A) P.B. Pratt, RNVR, from 8 January 1944
- Lieutenant Commander E.M. Britton, RN, from 5 January 1946 (KiFA 21 June 1946)
- Lieutenant(A) P.J.W.W. Cruttenden, RNVR, from 23 June 1946
- Lieutenant(A) J.R.W. Groves, RN, 21 October 1946
- Lieutenant Commander D.H. Lough, RN, from 14 October 1948
- Lieutenant Commander R.P. Keogh, RN, from 6 August 1949
- Lieutenant Commander H.A. Monk, DSM*, RN, from 23 October 1950
- Lieutenant Commander P.C.S. Bagley, RN, from 4 February 1952
- Lieutenant Commander A.D. Corkhill, DFC, RN, from 6 January 1954
- Lieutenant Commander B. Bevans, DSC, RN, 2 February 1955
- Lieutenant Commander R.C.B. Trelawney, RN, 3 June 1957
- Lieutenant Commander R.H. Hallam, RN, 19 October 1959
- Lieutenant Commander C.R. Mellor, RN, from 30 March 1962
- Lieutenant Commander A.A. Knight, RN, from 20 March 1964
- Lieutenant Commander P.J. Wreford, RN, 7 April 1966
- disbanded - 31 May 1967

Note: Abbreviation (A) signifies Air Branch of the RN or RNVR.
