= HMS Grebe =

Former military airfield in Egypt

HMS Grebe
- RNAS Dekheila
- Alexandria in Egypt

Site information
- Type: Naval Air Station
- Owner: Royal Egyptian Air Force
- Operator: Royal Navy
- Controlled by: Fleet Air Arm

Location
- Shown within Egypt HMS Grebe (Africa)
- Coordinates: 31°08′00″N 29°48′00″E

Site history
- In use: 1940 - 1946

Garrison information
- Occupants: Fleet Requirements Unit; Accommodation for disembarked units; Night flying training; Torpedo facilities

Airfield information
- Elevation: 20 feet (6 m) AMSL
Runways
Direction	Length and surface
04/22	980 yards (896 m) x 75 yards (69 m) Tarmac
07/25	1,050 yards (960 m) x 75 yards (69 m) Tarmac
13/31	1,030 yards (942 m) x 75 yards (69 m) Tarmac
17/35	1,100 yards (1,006 m) x 80 yards (73 m) Tarmac
- Source: Royal Navy Research Archive

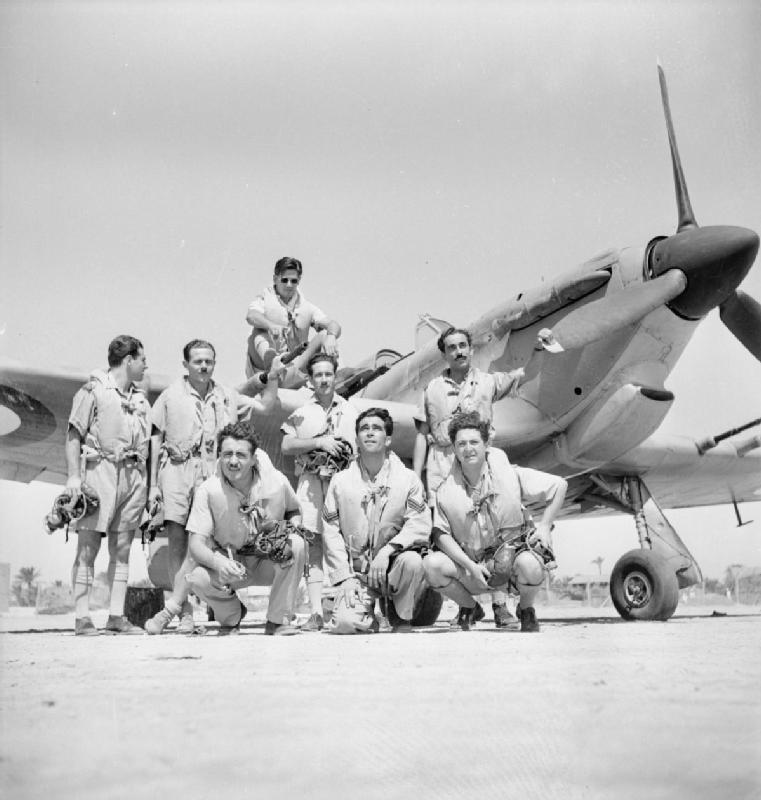
Greek pilots of the No. 335 Squadron RAF in front of a Hurricane IIc (Trop) at Dhekeila in 1942

HMS Grebe was the Royal Navy designation for the prewar Alexandria airport, known as Dekheila, during its use in the Second World War as a shore base for aircraft of the Fleet Air Arm (FAA). Coordinates are given as 31°08′0″N 29°48′0″E also known as LG-34, and renumbered as LG-235.

== History ==
Originally used as a shore base for aircraft flown ashore from aircraft carriers by the FAA (as HMS Nile II, under the control of HMS Nile), the airfield was taken over by the Royal Egyptian Air Force on the outbreak of the Second World War, but remained in use by the FAA. The field was subsequently loaned as a Naval Air Station on 16 September 1940, and commissioned as HMS Grebe, attached to HMS Nile, with a capacity of 72 aircraft. The field became self accounting on 1 April 1941, and acted as a base for all FAA units in Egypt and the Western Desert, as well as a fleet requirements unit. HMS Nile resumed control on 1 April 1943, retaining the name HMS Grebe. The field was reduced to a care and maintenance basis on 31 January 1946, before being returned to the control of Egypt on 18 March 1946.

== Units ==
The following units were here at some point:

- 700 Naval Air Squadron
- 701 Naval Air Squadron
- 728 Naval Air Squadron
- 775 Naval Air Squadron
- 800 Naval Air Squadron
- 802 Naval Air Squadron
- 803 Naval Air Squadron
- 805 Naval Air Squadron
- 806 Naval Air Squadron
- 807 Naval Air Squadron
- 809 Naval Air Squadron
- 810 Naval Air Squadron
- 812 Naval Air Squadron
- 813 Naval Air Squadron
- 815 Naval Air Squadron
- 819 Naval Air Squadron
- 820 Naval Air Squadron
- 821 Naval Air Squadron
- 823 Naval Air Squadron
- 824 Naval Air Squadron
- 825 Naval Air Squadron
- 826 Naval Air Squadron
- 827 Naval Air Squadron
- 829 Naval Air Squadron
- 837 Naval Air Squadron
- 838 Naval Air Squadron
- 879 Naval Air Squadron
- 881 Naval Air Squadron
- 882 Naval Air Squadron
- 885 Naval Air Squadron
- 888 Naval Air Squadron
- 889 Naval Air Squadron
- 893 Naval Air Squadron
- 899 Naval Air Squadron
- 1831 Naval Air Squadron
- 1841 Naval Air Squadron
- 1842 Naval Air Squadron
- 1846 Naval Air Squadron
