= 889 Naval Air Squadron =

Inactive flying squadron of the Royal Navy's Fleet Air Arm

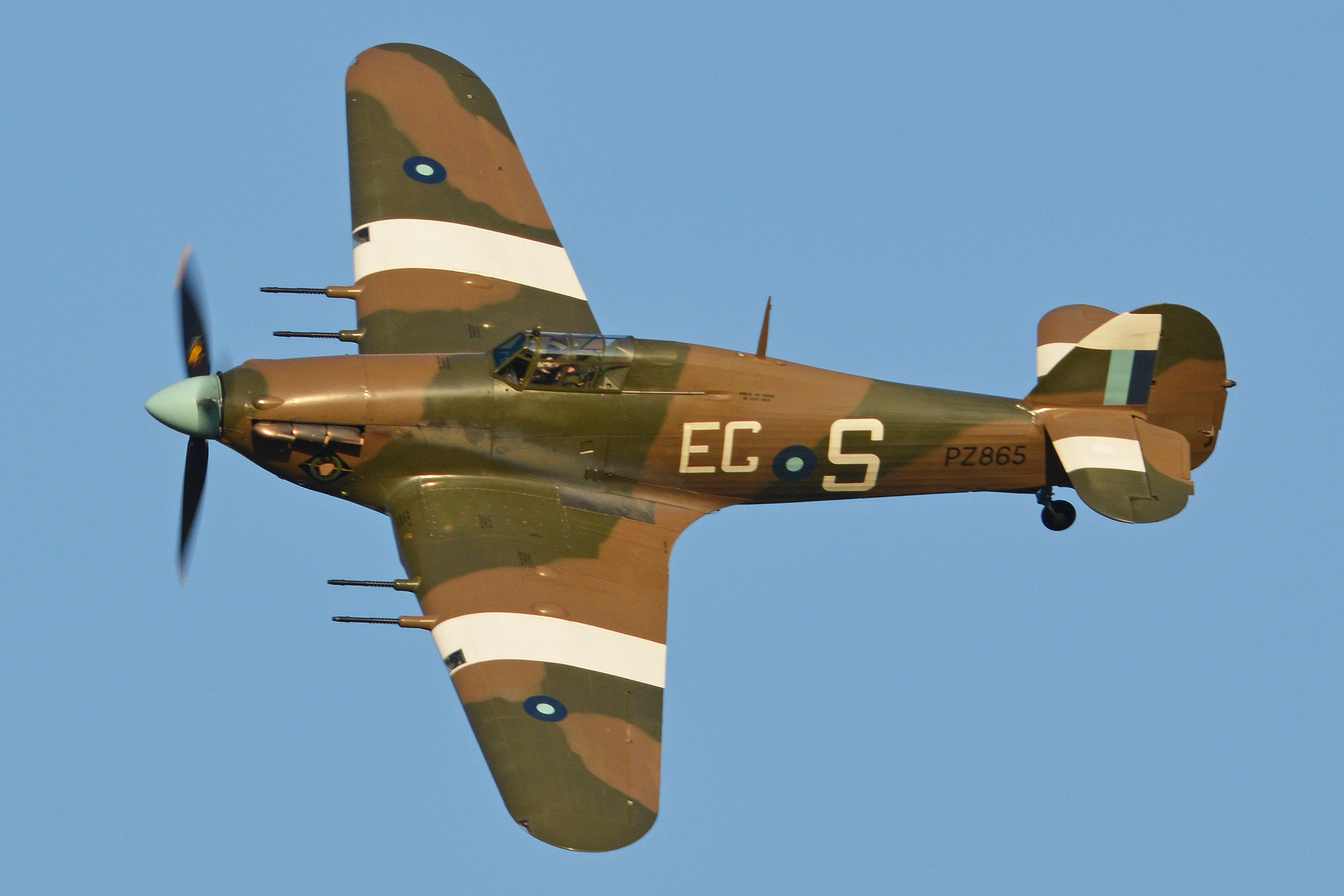
- Hawker Hurricane Mk IIC; an example of the type used by 889 NAS
- Active: 1942–1943; 1944; 1945
- Disbanded: 11 September 1945
- Country: United Kingdom
- Branch: Royal Navy
- Type: Single-seat fighter squadron
- Role: Fleet fighter squadron
- Size: twelve aircraft (initially)
- Part of: Fleet Air Arm
- Home station: See Naval air stations section for full list.

Commanders
- Notable commanders: Lieutenant Commander(A) R.E. Gardner, DSC, RNVR

Insignia
- Identification Markings: single letters (Seafire & Hellcat^{[note]})

Aircraft flown
- Fighter: Fairey Fulmar; Hawker Hurricane; Supermarine Seafire; Grumman Hellcat

889 Naval Air Squadron (889 NAS), sometimes referred to as 889 Squadron, was a Fleet Air Arm (FAA) naval air squadron of the United Kingdom’s Royal Navy (RN). It was last active during 1945 operating Grumman Hellcat fighter aircraft.

The squadron was created from the RN Fighter Flight in March 1942, to protect the Suez Canal. It initially conducted night fighter missions in Syria. By the end of the year, the squadron returned to Egypt for operations in the Western Desert. It was disbanded in February 1943. It was reformed in Ceylon in April 1944 and joined HMS Atheling in May for missions over the Bay of Bengal. Unfortunately, the squadron faced heavy losses due to accidents, including the loss of its commanding officer, leading to its disbandment in Ceylon in July. The squadron reformed again in June 1945, intended for the British Pacific Fleet, but it disbanded on September 11, the day after it embarked.

== History ==
=== Single-seat fighter squadron (1942-1943) ===
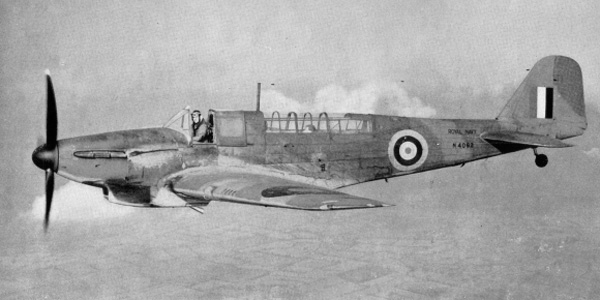
Fairey Fulmar Mk II of the type used by 889 NAS

889 Naval Air Squadron was initially established on 16 March 1942, originating from the RN Fighter Flight. The squadron was equipped with twelve Fairey Fulmar Mk II, a carrier-based reconnaissance/fighter aircraft, tasked with the defense of the Suez Canal.

From Fuka South, Egypt, the operation focused on maritime security and the defense of the Canal Zone, which included engagements during nighttime operations. In executing these defensive measures, each squadron was assigned to a specific ground beacon positioned along the North African coastline. The underlying principle was that any aircraft detected during a state of alert was presumed to be hostile and thus warranted an attack. However, despite numerous sorties, 889 Naval Air Squadron ultimately did not achieve any successful engagements.

Early night fighter operations were conducted governed by the Royal Air Force's (RAF) 234 and 252 Wings, and subsequently by 250 Wing in Syria. At the conclusion of the year, the squadron made its return to Egypt, where it was partially re-equipped with seven Hawker Hurricane Mk IIC fighter aircraft for missions in the Western Desert. The squadron was officially disbanded on 28 February 1943.

=== Single-seat fighter squadron (1944) ===
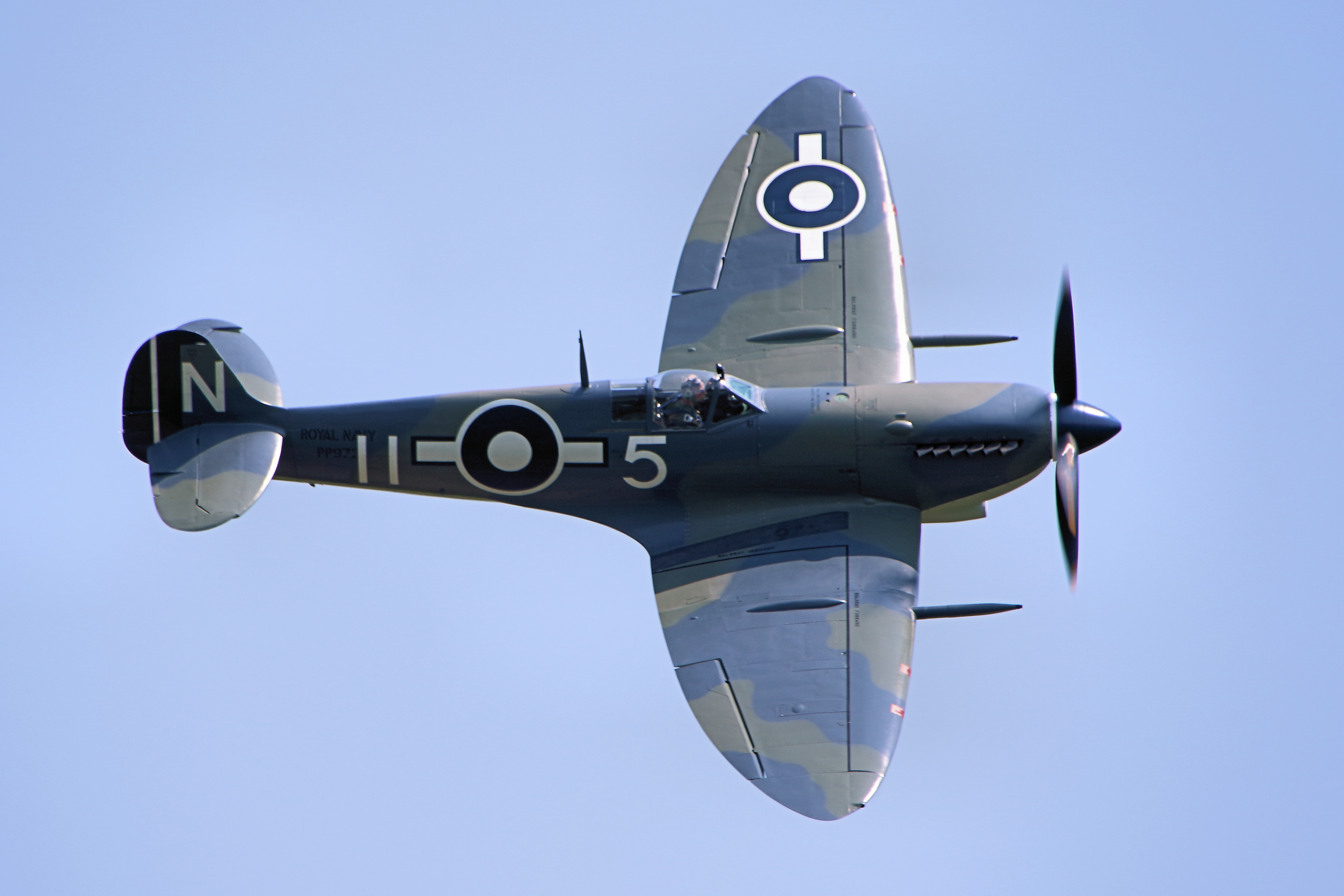
Supermarine Seafire F Mk.III; an example of the type flown by 889 Squadron

On 1 April 1944, 889 Naval Air Squadron was reformed at RNAS Colombo Racecourse (HMS Berhunda) in Ceylon, operating as a fighter unit with a complement of ten Supermarine Seafire L Mk.IIc and F Mk.III fighter aircraft, a navalised version of the Supermarine Spitfire. The squadron embarked in the escort carrier, HMS Atheling to conduct an offensive sweep over the Bay of Bengal. However, following the loss of several pilots in various accidents, including the original commanding officer, the squadron was disbanded at RNAS Puttalam (HMS Rajaliya), Ceylon, on 11 July.

=== Single-seat fighter squadron (1945) ===
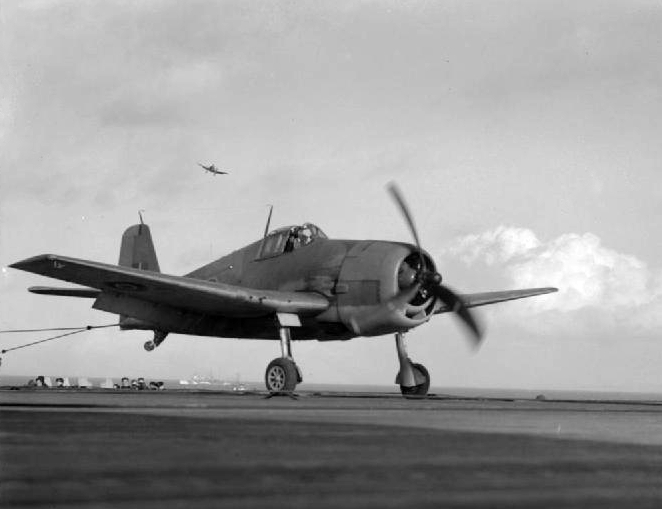
Grumman Hellcat landing on HMS Ravager

Re-established on 6 June 1945, at RNAS Woodvale (HMS Ringtail II), Merseyside, the squadron comprised six Grumman Hellcat F. Mk. I and FR. Mk. II, a carrier-borne fighter aircraft with the latter variant fitted with camera equipment, with the unit designated for service with the British Pacific Fleet. However, it was disbanded on 11 September, the day following its initial embarkation.

When the war ended, 889 Naval Air Squadron, equipped with six Grumman Hellcat F. Mk. I and FR. Mk. II (PR) photo-reconnaissance variants, was preparing to depart from Scotland for the Far East, the squadron had been based at RNAS Woodvale since its re-formation after VE Day, and practising carrier operations on HMS Trouncer before moving to HMS Ravager, to replace 888 Naval Air Squadron, and intended to photograph Japanese beaches prior planned invasion that was forestalled by the Atomic bombings of Hiroshima and Nagasaki. With the cessation of hostilities, the squadron (which included pilot William Stevenson) was disbanded and the Hellcat fighter aircraft dumped off the Scottish coast (the fate of many lend-lease aircraft that survived the war, which under the terms of the agreement were to be returned to the United States or paid for, while there was no requirement to refund the cost of aircraft that had been lost).

== Aircraft flown ==
The squadron has flown a number of different aircraft types, including:

- Fairey Fulmar Mk.II reconnaissance/fighter aircraft(March 1942 - February 1943)
- Hawker Hurricane Mk.IIC fighter aircraft (October 1942 - February 1943)
- Supermarine Seafire L Mk.IIc fighter aircraft (April - July 1944)
- Supermarine Seafire FR Mk.IIc fighter aircraft (April - July 1944)
- Supermarine Seafire F Mk.III fighter aircraft (April - July 1944)
- Grumman Hellcat F. Mk. I fighter aircraft (June - September 1945)
- Grumman Hellcat FR. Mk. II fighter and photo-reconnaissance aircraft (June - September 1945)

== Naval air stations ==
889 Naval Air Squadron operated from a number of naval air station of the Royal Navy, in the United Kingdom and overseas, a number of Royal Navy escort carriers and Royal Air Force stations:

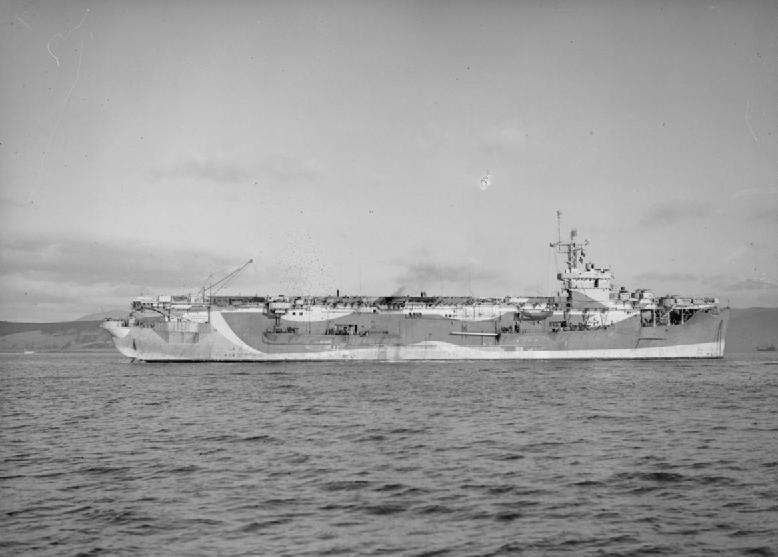
HMS Atheling

1942 - 1943

- Fuka LG.16 (16 March - 21 June 1942)
- Royal Naval Air Station Dekheila (HMS Grebe) (21 June - 1 July 1942)
- Royal Air Force Fayid (1 July - 25 November 1942)
- 'A' Flight
  - Hurghada (5 July - 24 November 1942)
- 'B' Flight
  - Abu Zenima (8 July - 15 October 1942)
  - Ras Gharib (15 October - 24 November 1942)
- base party
  - Rayak Air Base (17 July - 31 August 1942)
- LG.20 El Daba (25 November - 18 December 1942)
- LG.104 El Daba (18 December 1942 - 28 February 1943)
- disbanded - (28 February 1943)

1944

- Royal Naval Air Station Colombo Racecourse (HMS Berhunda) (1 April - 13 May 1944)
- HMS Atheling (13 May - 30 June 1944)
- Royal Naval Air Station Puttalam (HMS Rajaliya) (30 June - 11 July 1944)
- disbanded - (11 July 1944)

1945

- Royal Naval Air Station Woodvale (HMS Ringtail II) (1 June - 10 August 1945)
- HMS Ravager (Deck Landing Training 10 - 12 August 1945)
- Royal Naval Aircraft Maintenance Yard Belfast (HMS Gadwall) (12 - 28 August 1945)
- Royal Naval Air Station Woodvale (HMS Ringtail II) (28 August - 10 September 1945)
- HMS Trouncer (10 - 11 September 1945)
- Royal Naval Air Station Ayr (HMS Wagtail) disbanded - (11 September 1945)

== Commanding officers ==
List of commanding officers of 889 Naval Air Squadron, with date of appointment:

1942 - 1943

- Lieutenant Commander(A) A.R. Ramsey, DSC, RNVR, from 16 March 1942
- Lieutenant Commander(A) R.E. Gardner, DSC, RNVR, from 18 July 1942
- disbanded - 28 February 1943

1944

- Lieutenant Commander(A) F.A.J. Pennington, RNZNVR, from 1 April 1944 (KiFA 24 April 1944)
- Lieutenant(A) W.F.H. Schwenk, RNVR, from 25 April 1944
- Lieutenant Commander J.B. Edmundson, RN, from 24 May 1944
- Lieutenant Commander D.A.E. Holbrook, RN, from 11 June 1944
- disbanded - 11 July 1944

1945

- Lieutenant(A) N.D. Fisher, RNVR, from 1 June 1945
- disbanded - 11 September 1945

Note: Abbreviation (A) signifies Air Branch of the RN or RNVR.
