= Westland Widgeon (helicopter) =

1955 utility helicopter by Westland

Widgeon
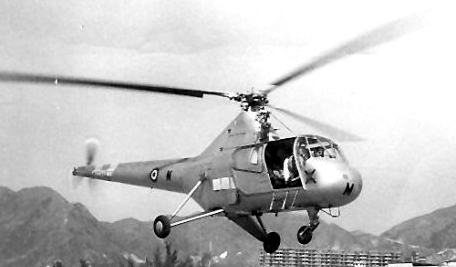
- Westland WS-51A Widgeon

General information
- Type: Helicopter
- Manufacturer: Westland Aircraft
- Number built: 12 new built plus 3 conversions

History
- First flight: 23 August 1955
- Developed from: Westland WS-51 Dragonfly

The Westland Widgeon is a helicopter that was developed by Westland Aircraft as a private venture improvement on the Westland WS-51 Dragonfly.

== Design and development ==
Westland Aircraft decided to make a private venture improvement on the Westland WS-51 Dragonfly helicopter, which was a licensed Sikorsky Aircraft design, by increasing the cabin capacity and replacing the Dragonfly's rotor head, blades and gearbox with the units used in the Westland Whirlwind. Three Dragonfly Series 1As were converted to WS-51 Series 2 Widgeon specifications and the first one flew on 23 August 1955. One of these conversions, registration G-ANLW, was the first helicopter to land at the London Heliport on 8 April 1959, and later appeared in the 1971 film, When Eight Bells Toll.

In 1957, there was a plan to take up to 24 existing Fleet Air Arm Dragonflies to Dragonfly HC.7 standard (as the Naval Widgeon was to become) but this was abandoned and it contributed to the decision to stop progress.

== Variants ==
WS-51 Series 2 Widgeon
12 new aircraft and three conversions from Series 1A Dragonflies.
Dragonfly HC.7
Proposed conversion of Fleet Air Arm Dragonflies to Widgeon standard. 24 conversions planned but never carried out.
UH-1
Brazilian Navy designation for the Widgeon. Originally designated HUW.

== Operators ==
Brazil

- Brazilian Navy

(Sri Lanka) Ceylon

- Royal Ceylon Air Force

Hong Kong

- Royal Hong Kong Auxiliary Air Force

Jordan

- Royal Jordanian Air Force

Nigeria

- Biafran Air Force - operated a single ex-Bristow Widgeon during the Biafran War.

United Kingdom

- Bristow Helicopters

== Surviving aircraft ==
=== Brazil ===
- N-7001 - WS-51/2 c/n WA/H/142 on static display in Museu da Aviação Naval at São Pedro da Aldeia, Rio de Janeiro

=== United Kingdom ===
- G-ANLW - WS51A Series 2 c/n WA/H/133 under restoration at Historic Helicopters, Chard
- G-AOZE/5N-ABW - WS51A Series 2 c/n WA/H/141 on static display at The Helicopter Museum, Weston-super-Mare
- G-APTW - WS51A Series 2 c/n WA/H/150 on static display at North East Land Sea & Air Museum, Sunderland

== Specifications (Widgeon) ==
Data from Westland Aircraft since 1915, Jane's all the World's Aircraft 1957-58

General characteristics

- Crew: 1
- Capacity: 4 pax
- Length: 40 ft 10 in (12.45 m)
- Width: 5 ft 10 in (1.78 m) fuselage width
- Height: 13 ft 2.75 in (4.0323 m) to top of rotor hub
- Empty weight: 4,424 lb (2,007 kg)
- Gross weight: 5,900 lb (2,676 kg)
- Fuel capacity: 83.2 imp gal (99.9 US gal; 378 L) in two 41.6 imp gal (50.0 US gal; 189 L) fuselage tanks; Oil capacity 6.5 imp gal (7.8 US gal; 30 L)
- Powerplant: 1 × Alvis Leonides 521/1 9-cylinder air-cooled radial piston engine (6lb boost), 520 hp (390 kW) for 5 minutes at 3,000 rpm at 43 inHg (150 kPa)

One-hour rating: 470 hp (350 kW) at 38 inHg (130 kPa) at 6,000 ft (1,800 m) at 2,900 rpm
Maximum continuous power: 375 hp (280 kW) at 2,800 rpm
Maximum weak mixture power: 305 hp (227 kW) at 31 inHg (100 kPa) at 2,800 rpm

- Main rotor diameter: 49 ft 2 in (14.99 m)
- Main rotor area: 1,898 sq ft (176.3 m^{2})

Performance

- Maximum speed: 104 mph (167 km/h, 90 kn) at sea level
- Cruise speed: 81 mph (130 km/h, 70 kn)
- Range: 310 mi (500 km, 270 nmi) maximum
- Service ceiling: 10,500 ft (3,200 m)
- Hover ceiling OGE: 5,000 ft (1,500 m)
- Hover ceiling IGE: 7,500 ft (2,300 m)
- g limits: +2.84g
- Rate of climb: 700 ft/min (3.6 m/s)
- Rate of sink: 720 ft/min (3.7 m/s)
- Disk loading: 3.1 lb/sq ft (15 kg/m^{2})
- Power/mass: 11.35 lb/shp (6.90 kg/kW)
- Cruising fuel consumption: 22 imp gal/h (26 gal/h; 100 L/h)

== See also ==
- List of rotorcraft

Related development

- Westland WS-51 Dragonfly

Aircraft of comparable role, configuration, and era

- Bristol Sycamore
- PZL SM-2
