= RAF St Jean =

Former military airfield in Israel

RAF St Jean
- Acre, Mandatory Palestine (now Israel) in Mandatory Palestine (now Israel)

Site information
- Type: Military airfield
- Owner: Royal Air Force
- Operator: Royal Air Force; United States Army Air Forces
- Controlled by: RAF Middle East Command
- Open to the public: No
- Condition: Abandoned

Location
- Location in present-day Israel
- Coordinates: 32°56′32.81″N 035°06′30.60″E

Site history
- In use: Until 1946
- Fate: Converted to agricultural land
- Battles/wars: North African Campaign (World War II)

Garrison information
- Occupants: No. 147 Squadron RAF; 343rd Bombardment Squadron (USAAF); 344th Bombardment Squadron (USAAF)

Royal Air Force St Jean or more simply RAF St Jean is a former Royal Air Force station in Mandatory Palestine, now Israel, which is located approximately 4 km east-northeast of Acre and 100 km north-northeast of Tel Aviv.

When located in the British Mandate of Palestine during the Second World War the airfield was used as a military airfield by the Royal Air Force and the United States Army Air Forces of America during the North African Campaign against Axis forces.

No. 147 Squadron RAF began to assemble at St. Jean in January 1942, but when no Consolidated Liberator aircraft could be made available, the ground crews were attached to other units.

USAAF Ninth Air Force units which used the airfield were:

- 343rd Bombardment Squadron (98th Bombardment Group), 21 August – 10 November 1942, Consolidated B-24 Liberator
- 344th Bombardment Squadron (98th Bombardment Group), 21 August – 11 November 1942, Consolidated B-24 Liberator

After the war, the airfield appears to have been abandoned. The area today is a collection of agricultural fields. Two single-lane agricultural roads in a "V" pattern are the remnants of the airfield's runways (17/35, 10/28), but no evidence of the support area or runways remain.

== Bibliography ==
- Maurer, M. Air Force Combat Units of World War II. Maxwell AFB, Alabama: Office of Air Force History, 1983. ISBN 0-89201-092-4.
- Maurer, M., ed. (1982) [1969]. Combat Squadrons of the Air Force, World War II (PDF) (reprint ed.). Washington, DC: Office of Air Force History. ISBN 0-405-12194-6. LCCN 70605402. OCLC 72556. Archived from the original (PDF) on 20 December 2016.
