= 777 Naval Air Squadron =

Inactive flying squadron of the Royal Navy's Fleet Air Arm

- Squadron badge
- Active: 1941–1944; 1945–1946
- Disbanded: 3 January 1946
- Country: United Kingdom
- Branch: Royal Navy
- Type: Fleet Air Arm Second Line Squadron
- Role: Fleet Requirements Unit; Carrier Trials Unit
- Size: Squadron
- Part of: Fleet Air Arm
- Home station: See Naval air stations section for full list.
- Mottos: Expertam arter (Latin for 'We teach the art which we have gained by experiment')
- Aircraft: See Aircraft operated section for full list.

Insignia
- Squadron badge description: Blue, over a base barry way of four white and blue an eagle displayed gold armed and langued red gorged with a mural crown red grasping in each talon a trident point downward whte (1945)
- Identification Markings: No markings or single letters (1941 - 1944); SA+ (Defiants) single letters (1945-46)

777 Naval Air Squadron (777 NAS), also known as 777 Squadron, is an inactive Fleet Air Arm (FAA) naval air squadron of the United Kingdom’s Royal Navy (RN), although the squadron number was assigned to the aircraft collection at the Fleet Air Arm Museum in April 2006.

It was initially formed as a Fleet Requirements Unit in West Africa during the Second World War. Throughout most of 1943, the squadron was responsible for the air defence of Sierra Leone, but it disbanded at HMS Spurwing, RNAS Hastings, Sierra Leone, during December 1944.

The squadron reformed in May 1945, from 'B' Flight of 778 Naval Air Squadron, as a Carrier Trials Unit operating aboard HMS Pretoria Castle, and using shore bases at HMS Siskin, at RNAS Gosport, and HMS Peregrine, at RNAS Ford, in England, and HMS Wagtail, at RNAS Ayr, in Scotland.

== History ==
777 Naval Air Squadron was originally planned to form on 15 December 1939, as a Reserve Fighter Pool squadron, at RNAS Eastleigh (HMS Raven), Hampshire, England and to have been equipped with Blackburn Roc, a naval fighter aircraft and Blackburn Skua, a dive bomber and fighter aircraft.

=== Fleet Requirements Unit (1941-1944) ===
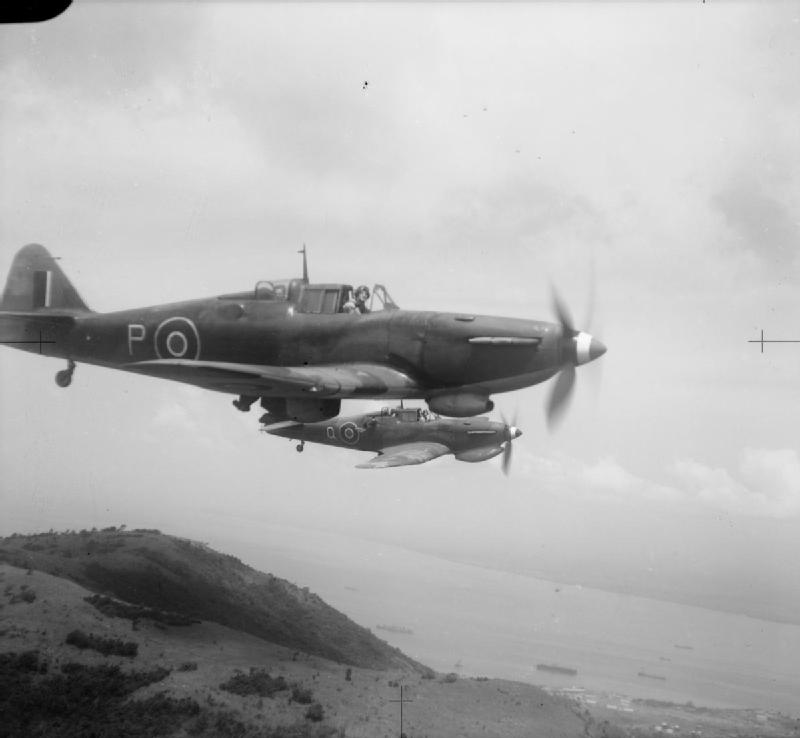
Two Boulton Paul Defiant aircraft in flight after taking off from HMS Spurwing, Royal Naval Air Station in Sierra Leone

777 Naval Air Squadron was formed at RAF Hastings in Sierra Leone, West Africa on 1 August 1941. This airfield was located 8 miles (13 km) south-east of the port city of Freetown, and was sited about 0.5 miles (0.80 km) north-east of the village of Hastings. The squadron initially operated only Fairey Swordfish, a biplane torpedo bomber and Blackburn Roc, a naval turret fighter aircraft. However, by 1942 the squadron had acquired some Boulton Paul Defiant interceptor and target tug aircraft and Supermarine Walrus, an amphibious maritime patrol aircraft.

Lodger facility for an RN Air Section on the RAF station from 1 April 1940 had been granted. However, in March 1943, the control of the airfield was given over to the Admiralty and it was commissioned HMS Spurwing, and the airfield was also known as RNAS Hastings. Between 1942 and 1944, the squadron flew it's Supermarine Walrus amphibious aircraft on search and rescue sorties as well as anti-submarine patrols. During 1943, 777 Naval Air Squadron was involved with the air defence of Sierra Leone, a task which they fulfilled for most of the year.

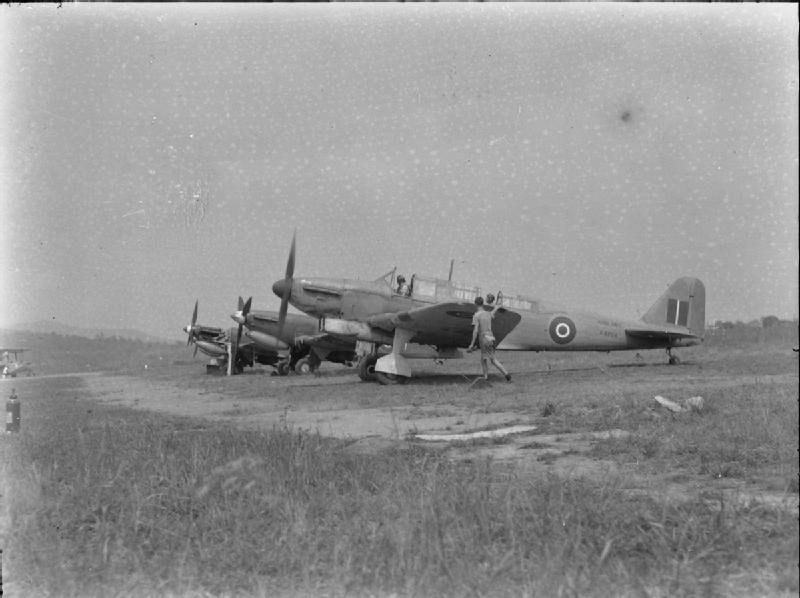
A Fairey Fulmar aircraft of the Fleet Air Arm about to take off from HMS Spurwing, a Royal Naval Air Station in Sierra Leone, on a coastal reconnaissance

During the squadron's existence, there were several accidents in April, June and October 1944, three Target Tug Boulton Paul Defiants belonging to the squadron were written off. It seems that in all three of these incidents, there were no fatalities.

Sub-Lieutenant D.R. Bentley died on 9 June 1943.

777 Naval Air Squadron disbanded at RNAS Hastings (HMS Spurwing), on 25 December 1944.

=== Carrier Trials Unit (1945-1946) ===
The squadron was reformed on 23 May 1945 from 'B' Flight 778 Naval Air Squadron as a carrier trials unit for service aboard HMS Pretoria Castle. It used a variety of aircraft including Supermarine Seafire and de Havilland Mosquito.

It was initially equipped with eight aircraft, two each of Fairey Albacore, a biplane torpedo bomber, Fairey Barracuda, a torpedo and dive bomber, Fairey Fulmar a reconnaissance and fighter aircraft and Supermarine Seafire, a navalised version of the Supermarine Spitfire fighter aircraft, but it also utilised various aircraft from 778 Naval Air Squadron. The squadrons role was to undertake trials on aircraft and aircraft carrier equipment (778 NAS was tasked with individual aircraft trials). It initially used RNAS Ayr (HMS Wagtail), South Ayrshire, Scotland as an operational shore base, followed by RNAS Ford (HMS Peregrine), Sussex, England, and then RNAS Gosport (HMS Siskin), Hampshire, England. 777 Naval Air Squadron disbanded back into 778 Naval Air Squadron on 3 January 1946.

=== Fleet Air Arm Museum ===
In April 2006, Rear Admiral Fleet Air Arm allocated 777 Naval Air Squadron number to the aircraft collection at the Fleet Air Arm Museum, at RNAS Yeovilton (HMS Heron), Somerset.

== Aircraft operated ==
The squadron operated a variety of different aircraft and versions:

- Blackburn Roc Mk.I fighter aircraft (August 1941 - August 1943)
- Fairey Swordfish I torpedo bomber (August 1941 - March 1944)
- Supermarine Walrus amphibious maritime patrol aircraft (May 1942 - December 1944)
- Fairey Swordfish II torpedo bomber (August 1942 - July 1944)
- Boulton Paul Defiant TT Mk I target tug (October 1942 - 1944)
- Fairey Fulmar reconnaissance/fighter aircraft (1943-1944)
- Vought Kingfisher I observation floatplane (March - August 1944)
- Fairey Firefly I fighter aircraft (May - July 1945)
- Grumman Tarpon GR.I torpedo bomber (July - December 1945)
- Grumman Hellcat F. Mk. I fighter aircraft (July - December 1945)
- Fairey Barracuda Mk II torpedo and dive bomber (July - December 1945)
- Vought Corsair Mk III fighter bomber (July 1945 - )
- Taylorcraft Auster I liaison aircraft (August - December 1945)
- de Havilland Mosquito B Mk.25 bomber (October - December 1945)
- Supermarine Seafire F Mk III fighter aircraft (October - December 1945)
- de Havilland Mosquito FB Mk. VI fighter bomber (November - December 1945)
- Supermarine Seafire F Mk XVII fighter aircraft (December 1945)

== Naval air stations ==
777 Naval Air Squadron operated from a number of naval air station of the Royal Navy, in the United Kingdom, a Royal Navy converted Escort Carrier and airbases overseas:

1941 - 1944

- RN Air Section/Royal Naval Air Station Hastings (HMS Spurwing), Sierra Leone, (1 August 1941 - 25 December 1944)
  - Harper Field, Liberia, (Detachments April - September 1944)
  - Roberts Field Airport, Liberia, (Detachments May - October 1944)
- disbanded - (25 December 1944)

1945 - 1946

- Royal Naval Air Station Ayr (HMS Wagtail), South Ayrshire, (23 May 1945 - 23 July 1945)
- HMS Pretoria Castle/Royal Naval Air Station Ayr (HMS Wagtail), South Ayrshire, (23 July 1945 - 17 September 1945)
- HMS Pretoria Castle/Royal Naval Air Station Ford (HMS Peregrine), West Sussex, (17 September 1945 - 1 November 1945)
  - Royal Naval Air Station Gosport (HMS Siskin), Hampshire, (Detachments 10 October 1945 - 1 November 1945)
- Royal Naval Air Station Ford (HMS Peregrine), West Sussex, (1 November 1945 - 3 March 1946)
- disbanded - (3 January 1946)

2006 -

- Fleet Air Arm Museum, RNAS Yeovilton, Somerset, (6 April 2006 - date)

== Commanding officers ==
List of commanding officers of 777 Naval Air Squadron, with date of appointment:

1941 - 1944

- Lieutenant Commander C.E. Fenwick, RN, from 1 August 1941
- Lieutenant Commander H.J. Gibbs, RN, from 5 August 1941
- Lieutenant Commander(A) F.C. Muir, RNVR, from 22 July 1942
- Lieutenant Commander(A) C. Draper, RNVR, from 27 September 1943
- Lieutenant Commander(A) M.N. Stewart, RN, from 15 March 1944
- disbanded - 25 December 1944

1945 - 1946

- Lieutenant Commander(A) D.R. Carter, RNVR, from 23 May 1945
- Lieutenant Commander(A) J.R.N. Gardner, RN, from 4 June 1945
- disbanded - 3 January 1946

Note: Abbreviation (A) signifies Air Branch of the RN or RNVR.
