= 778 Naval Air Squadron =

Inactive flying squadron of the Royal Navy's Fleet Air Arm

- Squadron badge
- Active: 1939–1948; 1951–1952
- Disbanded: 7 July 1952
- Country: United Kingdom
- Branch: Royal Navy
- Type: Fleet Air Arm Second Line Squadron
- Role: Service Trials Unit; Airborne Early Warning
- Size: Squadron
- Part of: Fleet Air Arm
- Home station: See Naval air stations section for full list.
- Mottos: Ex quaestione veritas (Latin for 'From examination the truth emerges')
- Aircraft: See Aircraft operated section for full list.

Commanders
- Notable commanders: Admiral Sir John Devereux Treacher, KCB

Insignia
- Squadron Badge Description: Blue, a pair of inside and outside callipers interlaced gold (1945)
- Identification Markings: CO (from March 1943); AO (from August 1944 no individual letters); FDA+ (all types January 1946); 000-042 (1946); 001-029 (1947); 301-304 (Skyraider)
- Shore Fin Codes: FD (1946); LP (1947); CW (Skyraider)

778 Naval Air Squadron (778 NAS) was a Fleet Air Arm (FAA) naval air squadron of the United Kingdom's Royal Navy (RN). During the Second World War the squadron was a Service Trials Unit (STU) initially based at HMS Daedalus, RNAS Lee-on-Solent, Hampshire, England before moving to HMS Condor, RNAS Arbroath, Angus, Scotland on 6 July 1940. The squadron tested all types of aircraft that could be used by the Royal Navy. Key to this was testing new types for deck landing on aircraft carriers. Such aircraft included various types of Supermarine Seafires, Grumman Hellcats, Grumman Martlets, Grumman Avengers, and Vought Corsairs. The squadron was reformed on 5 November 1951 with Douglas Skyraider AEW.1 but was disbanded on 7 July 1952 to form the basis of 849 Naval Air Squadron.

== History ==
=== Service Trials Unit (1939-1948) ===
778 Naval Air Squadron formed on 28 September 1939 at RNAS Lee-on-Solent (HMS Daedalus), Hampshire. The Squadron's role was as a Service Trials Unit Squadron. This task included the evaluation and testing of tactics, the approval of all front line aircraft types, the equipment, including armaments, such as flame floats and aerial mines. It was later tasked with approving new aircraft carrier catapult and arrester systems. Essentially new aircraft went via the squadron for approval for future Fleet Air Arm use and this included some Royal Air Force and experimental aircraft. The squadron initially operated with Blackburn Roc, a naval turret fighter aircraft, Blackburn Skua, a carrier-based dive bomber and fighter aircraft, Fairey Swordfish, a biplane torpedo bomber and Supermarine Walrus, an amphibious biplane. Fairey Albacore, a biplane torpedo bomber and Fairey Fulmar, a carrier-based reconnaissance and fighter aircraft were added soon after.

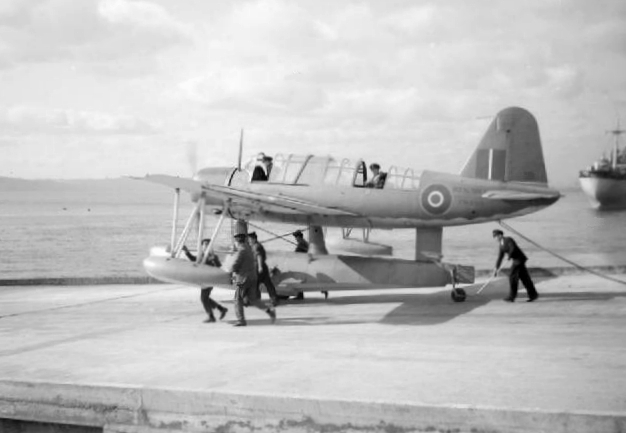
Vought Kingfisher of 778 Naval Air Squadron going down the slipway at Arbroath

The squadron moved to RNAS Arbroath (HMS Condor), Angus, Scotland, on 6 July 1940. enabling the unit to utilise the new Dummy Deck there also equipped with arrestor cable. While at HMS Condor the squadron first received Grumman Martlet, an American carrier-based fighter aircraft (known as Wildcat by US forces and then also Wildcat by the Fleet Air Arm from 1944), and Hawker Sea Hurricane, a navalised version of the Hawker Hurricane fighter aircraft. The following couple of years at HMS Condor saw Fairey Barracuda, a British carrier-borne torpedo/dive bomber, Vought Chesapeake, an American carrier-based dive bomber, Vought Kingfisher, an American catapult-launched observation floatplane and Supermarine Seafire, a navalised version of the Supermarine Spitfire fighter aircraft, arrive.

778 NAS moved to RNAS Crail (HMS Jackdaw), Fife, Scotland, on 5 March 1943. On 26 July 1943, 'B' Flight was formed for deck trials aboard HMS Pretoria Castle, a converted armed merchant cruiser to escort carrier of the Royal Navy, and this Flight eventually became 777 Naval Air Squadron, in 1945. The deck trials were to support development work on aircraft carrier equipment, including flight deck lighting and beam approach trials.

The squadron returned RNAS Arbroath (HMS Condor) on 15 August 1944. It received Grumman Avenger, an American torpedo bomber, Vought Corsair, a carrier-based fighter aircraft, Blackburn Firebrand, a strike fighter and Fairey Firefly, a carrier-based fighter and anti-submarine aircraft. On 7 March 1945, 'C' Flight was formed out of the disbanded 739 Naval Air Squadron, to undertake blind approach trials. Then in August that year the squadron moved south, relocating to RNAS Gosport (HMS Siskin), Hampshire, England, on 9 August and in the October it absorbed 707 Naval Air Squadron, taking on its radar trials.

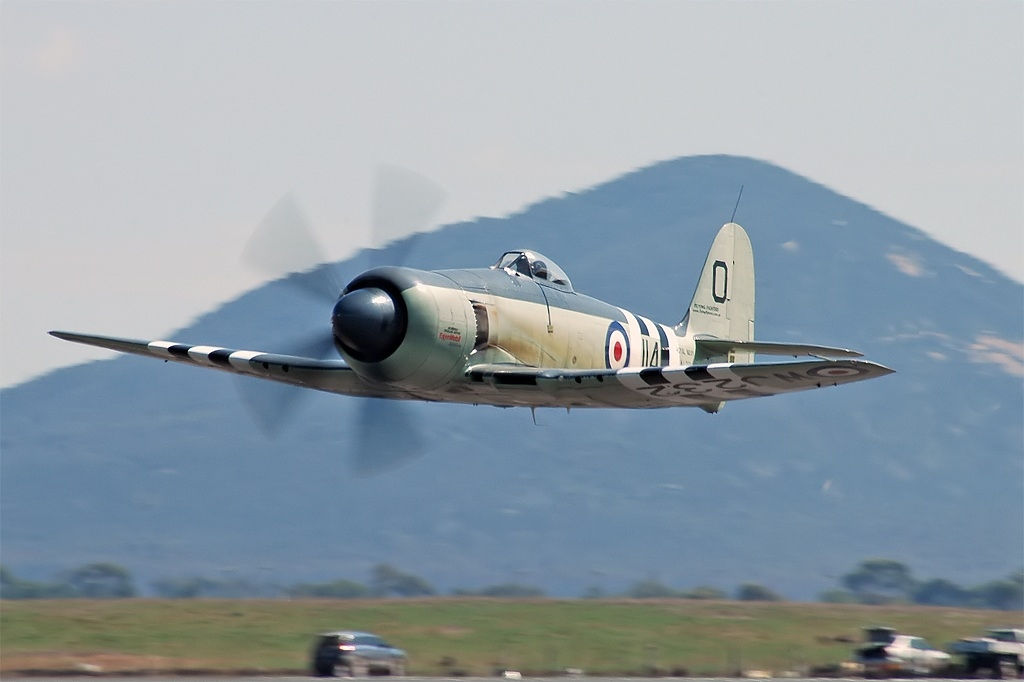
Hawker Sea Fury FB.11, an example of the type used by 778 NAS

778 Naval Air Squadron moved to RNAS Ford (HMS Peregrine), Sussex, England, on 3 January 1946. Here it absorbed 777 Naval Air Squadron, adding Carrier Trials Unit to its tasks. February 1947 saw Hawker Sea Fury, a British carrier-based fighter aircraft, tested by the Intensive Flying Development Flight, and later, the squadron moved to nearby RAF Tangmere, Sussex, on 18 July, due to runway repairs. May 1948 saw the squadron move again when it returned to RNAS Lee-on-Solent (HMS Daedalus). 778 Naval Air Squadron disbanded, into 703 Naval Air Squadron, on 16 August 1948.

=== Airborne Early Warning (1951-1952) ===
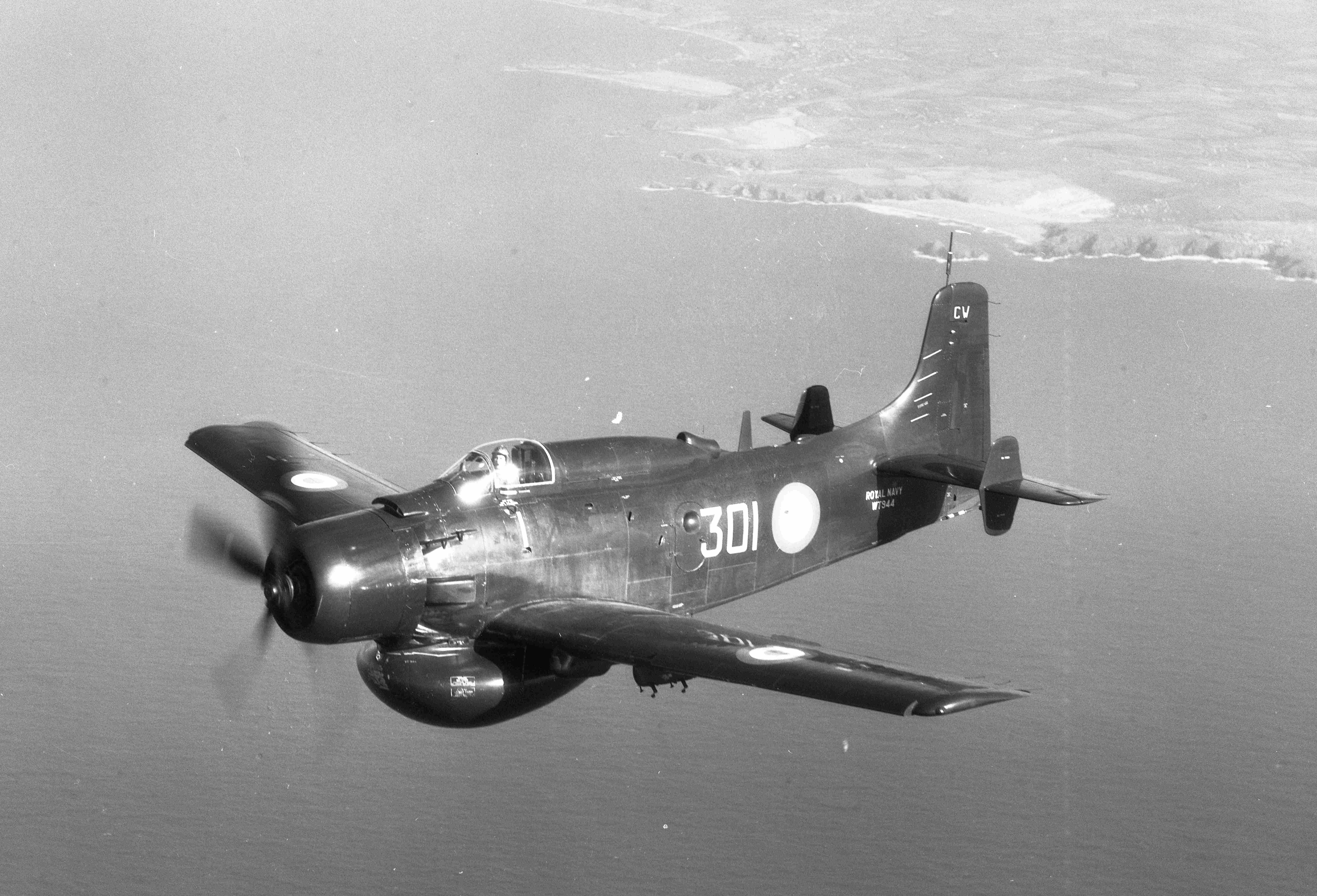
Douglas Skyraider AEW.1 WT944 '301' of 778 Naval Air Squadron

778 Naval Air Squadron reformed at RNAS Culdrose (HMS Seahawk), Cornwall, England, on 5 November 1951 as the Airborne Early Warning squadron. It was equipped with four Douglas Skyraider AEW.1, an American single-seat attack aircraft. This was the AD-4W aircraft, a three-seat airborne early warning variant, which were acquired by the Royal Navy through the Mutual Defense Assistance Act. These aircraft were introduced into the Fleet Air Arm by the squadron, led by Lieutenant J.D. Treacher, RN.

Following an exhaustive training approach it was decided to organise the unit into a first-line squadron. 778 Naval Air squadron disbanded on 7 July 1952, and became 849 Naval Air Squadron.

== Aircraft operated ==
The squadron operated a number of different aircraft types. There are around seventy-eight different marks of aircraft known to have been operated by the squadron between 1939 & 1952:

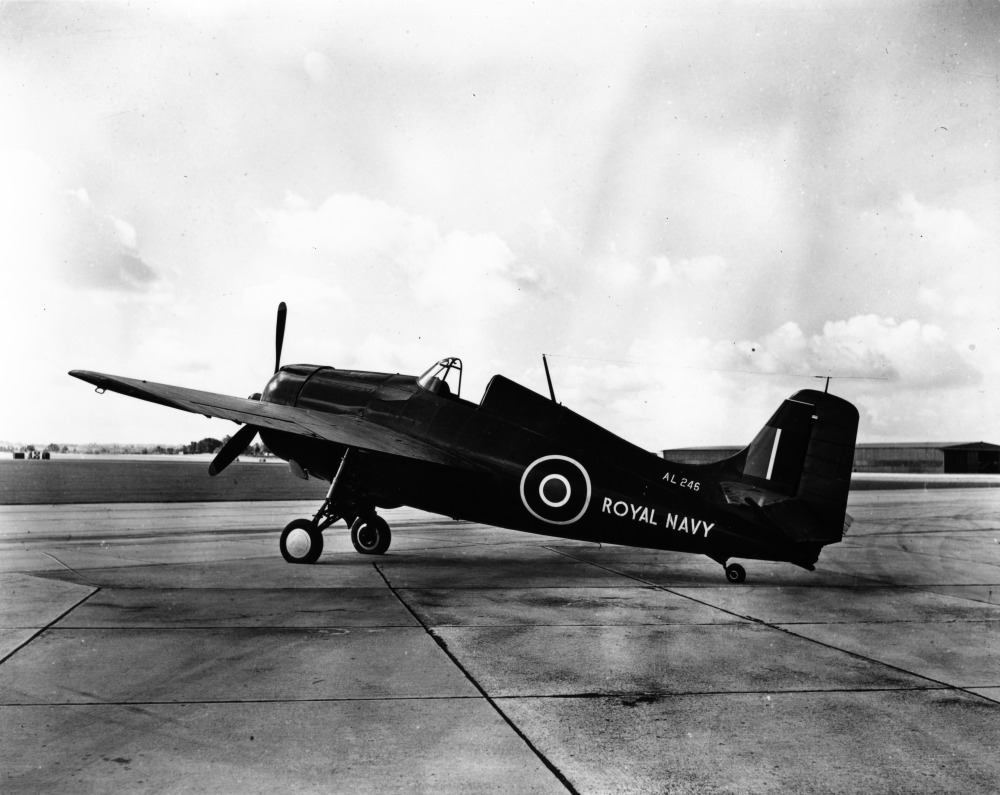
Grumman Martlet Mk I

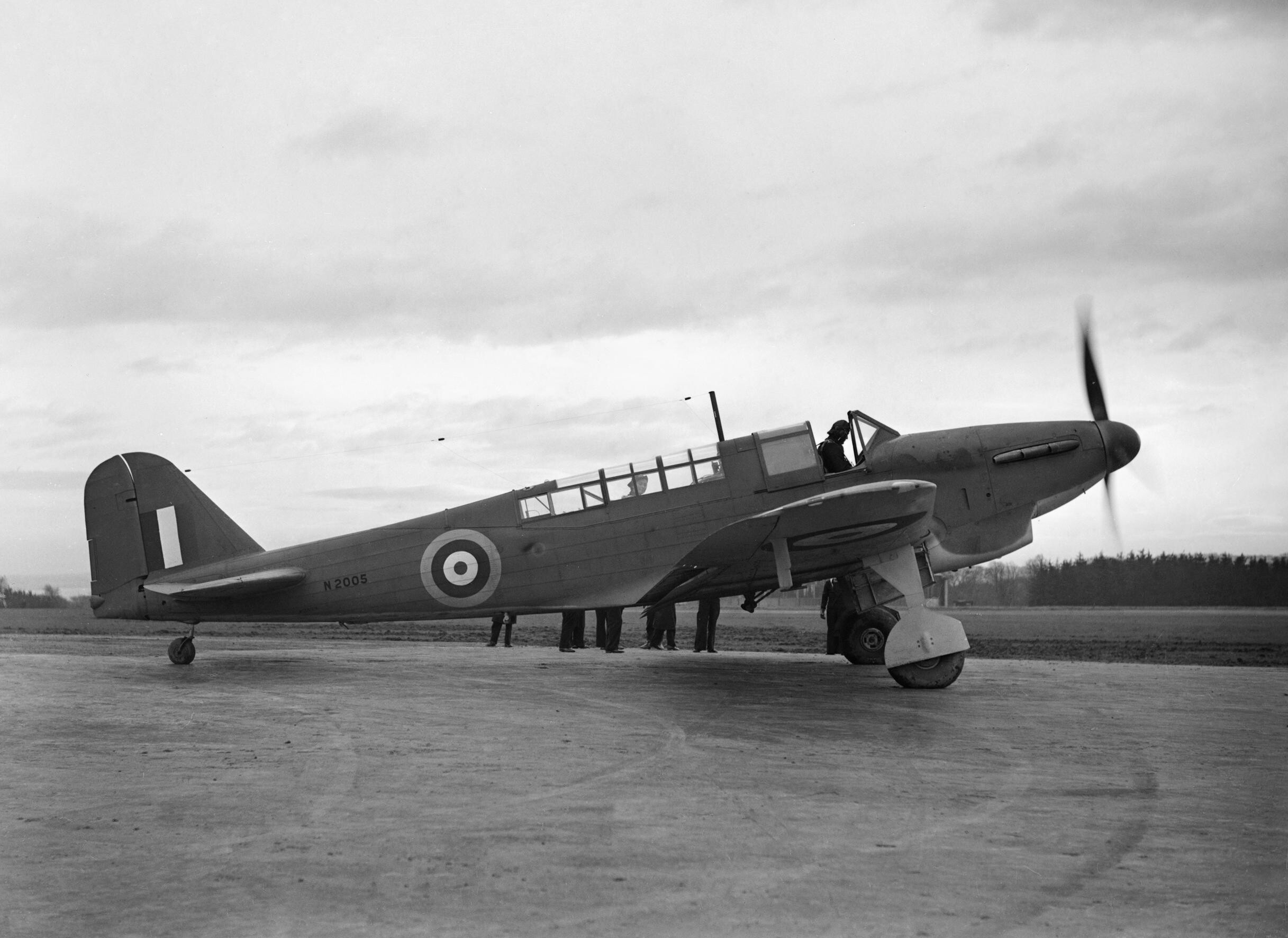
Fairey Fulmar Mk.I

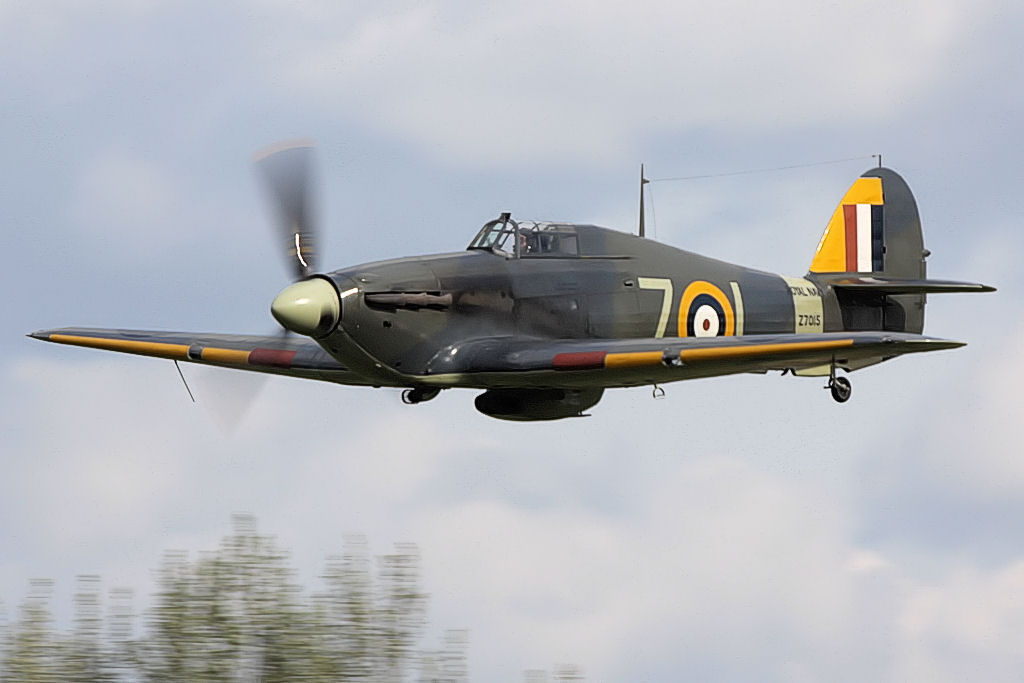
Hawker Sea Hurricane Mk IB

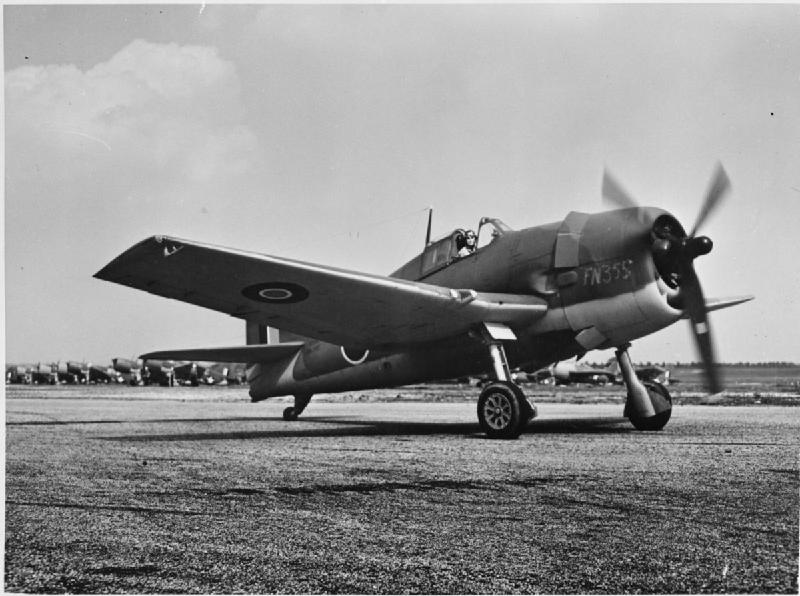
Grumman Hellcat F. Mk. I

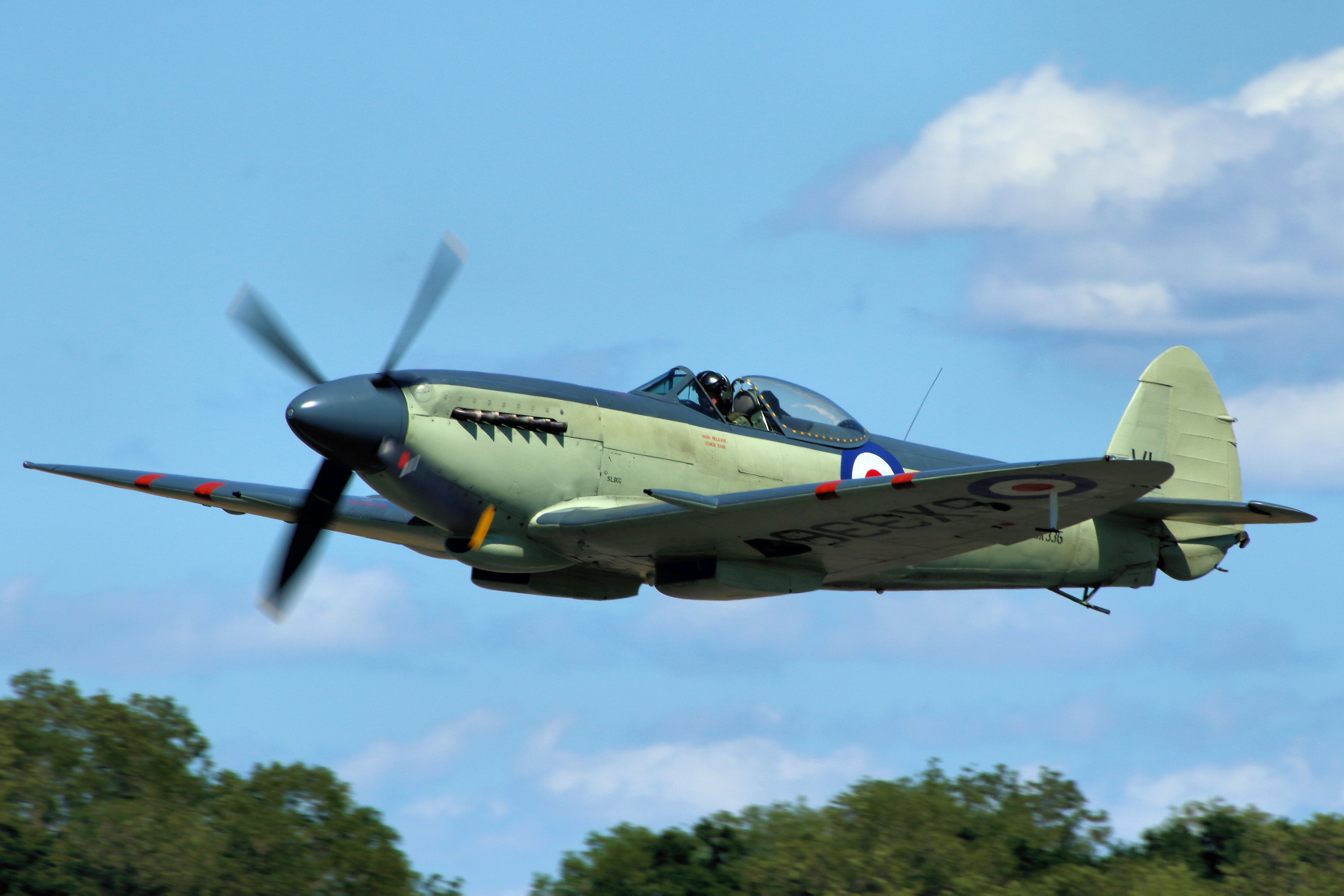
Supermarine Seafire F Mk XVII

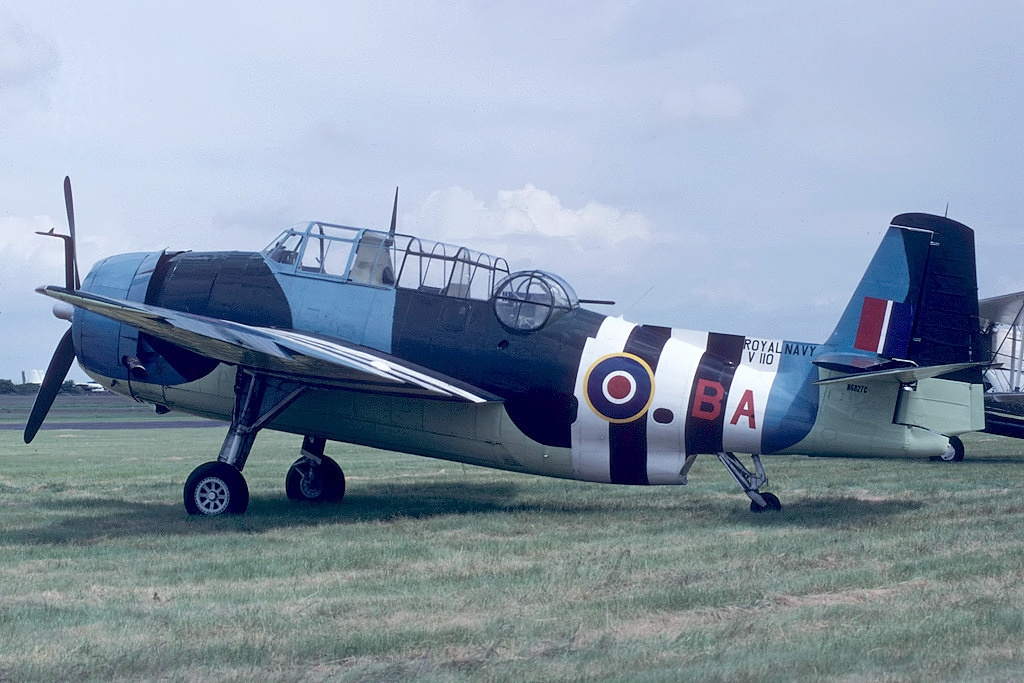
Grumman TBM-3E Avenger

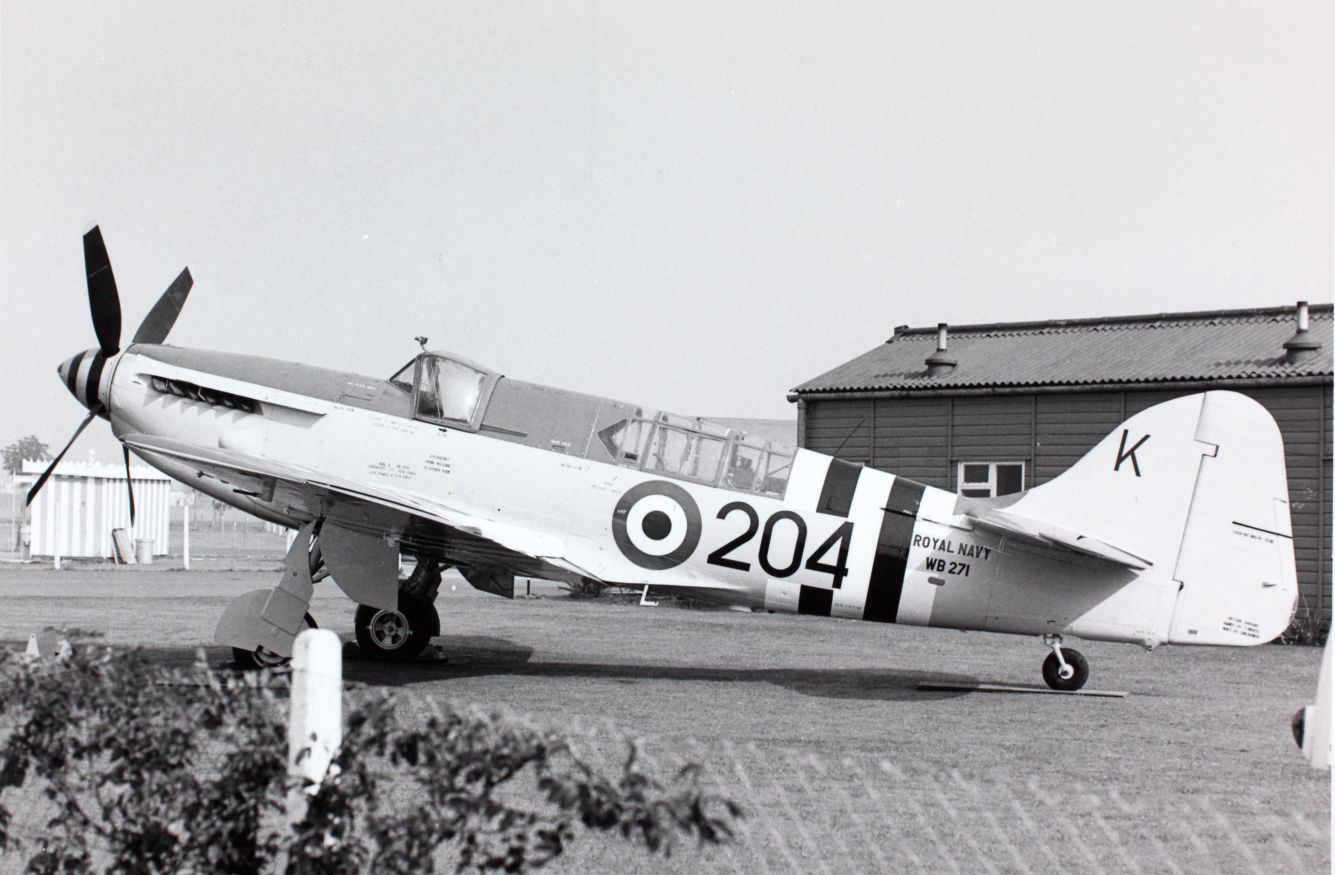
Fairey Firefly

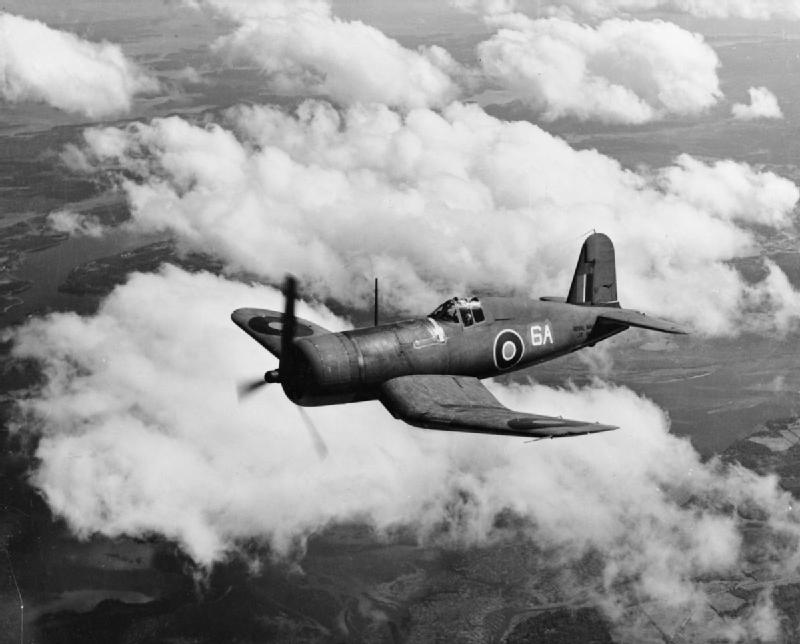
Vought Corsair

- Blackburn Skua Mk.II dive bomber and fighter aircraft (September 1939 - March 1940)
- Supermarine Walrus maritime patrol aircraft (September 1939 - 1943)
- Fairey Swordfish I torpedo bomber (September 1939 - January 1944)
- Blackburn Roc fighter aircraft (December 1939 - February 1942)
- Fairey Albacore torpedo bomber (February 1940 - February 1944)
- Blackburn Roc FP fighter aircraft (April - June 1940)
- Fairey Fulmar Mk.I reconnaissance/fighter aircraft (May 1940 - September 1944)
- Grumman Martlet Mk I fighter aircraft (September 1940 - November 1941)
- Fairey Fulmar Mk.II reconnaissance/fighter aircraft (December 1940 - September 1944)
- Vought Chesapeake Mk.I dive bomber (June - December 1941)
- Hawker Sea Hurricane Mk IB fighter aircraft (August 1941 - June 1943)
- Percival Proctor IA radio trainer/communications aircraft (October 1941)
- Percival Proctor IIA radio trainer/communications aircraft (October - November 1941)
- Supermarine Spitfire Mk Vb fighter aircraft (November 1941)
- Gloster Sea Gladiator fighter aircraft (December 1941 - March 1943)
- Supermarine Seafire Mk Ib fighter aircraft (January 1942 - February 1945
- Supermarine Spitfire Mk Vb/hooked fighter aircraft (April - May 1942)
- Vought Kingfisher observation floatplane (May - August 1942)
- Fairey Barracuda Mk I torpedo and dive bomber (May 1942 - November 1943)
- Grumman Tarpon GR.I torpedo bomber (June 1942 - April 1945)
- Supermarine Seafire F Mk IIc fighter aircraft (July 1942 - April 1944)
- Miles Magister trainer aircraft (September 1942)
- Fairey Swordfish II torpedo bomber (September 1942 - February 1945)
- Douglas Havoc Mk I attack aircraft (October - December 1942)
- Grumman Wildcat Mk V fighter aircraft (1943 - 1945)
- Fairey Barracuda Mk II torpedo and dive bomber (February 1943 - November 1946)
- Blackburn Firebrand F.I strike fighter (February 1943)
- Supermarine Spitfire Mk XII fighter aircraft (February - March 1943)
- Fairey Firefly FR.I fighter and anti-submarine aircraft (February 1943 - July 1948)
- Grumman Martlet Mk IV fighter aircraft (April 1943 - April 1944)
- Hawker Sea Hurricane Mk IIC fighter aircraft (May - October 1943)
- Supermarine Seafire Mk III fighter aircraft (May 1943 - March 1947)
- Grumman Hellcat F. Mk. I fighter aircraft (October 1943 - March 1946)
- Supermarine Sea Otter Mk I/Mk II air-sea rescue flying boat (November 1943 - July 1946)
- Grumman Martlet Mk II fighter aircraft (January 1944)
- Supermarine Seafire F Mk XV fighter aircraft (March 1944 - August 1946)
- de Havilland Mosquito FB Mk. VI fighter bomber (March 1944 - November 1945)
- Vought Corsair Mk II fighter aircraft (April 1944 - November 1945)
- Grumman Avenger Mk.II torpedo bomber (April 1944 - July 1947)
- Supermarine Spitfire Mk IX fighter aircraft (April 1944 - May 1945)
- Supermarine Spitfire Mk VIII/hooked fighter aircraft (April- August 1944)
- Miles Messenger liaison aircraft (May 1944)
- Curtiss Helldiver I dive bomber (November - December 1944)
- Grumman Wildcat Mk VI fighter aircraft (December 1944 - June 1945)
- Beech Traveller I utility aircraft (January - August 1945)
- Taylorcraft Auster I liaison aircraft (January 1945 - January 1948)
- Grumman Hellcat F. Mk. II fighter aircraft (February - 1945)
- Vought Corsair Mk III fighter aircraft (February - May 1945)
- Bell P-39 Airacobra/hooked fighter aircraft (April 1945)
- Blackburn Firebrand TF. III strike fighter (April - September 1945)
- de Havilland Mosquito B Mk.25 bomber aircraft (May - September 1945)
- Supermarine Seafire F Mk 45 fighter aircraft (May 1945 - October 1947)
- Supermarine Seafire F Mk XVII fighter aircraft (July 1945 - July 1948
- Avro Anson Mk I multirole aircraft (1945 - 1946)
- Blackburn Firebrand TF. IV strike fighter (September 1945 - May 1947)
- Vought Corsair Mk IV fighter aircraft (October - December 1945)
- Fairey Barracuda Mk III torpedo and dive bomber (December 1945 - April 1948)
- de Havilland Sea Hornet F.20 fighter (March 1946 - July 1948)
- Airspeed Oxford trainer aircraft (April 1946 - August 1947)
- Grumman Avenger Mk.III torpedo bomber (April 1946 - January 1948)
- de Havilland Sea Mosquito TR Mk.33 torpedo bomber (April 1946 - July 1948)
- de Havilland Sea Vampire F.1 jet fighter aircraft (July 1946)
- Supermarine Seafire F Mk 46 fighter aircraft (July 1946 - January 1948)
- Fairey Barracuda TR. V torpedo and dive bomber (September 1946 - July 1947)
- Supermarine Seafire F Mk 47 fighter aircraft (December 1946 - March 1947)
- de Havilland Mosquito PR Mk.XVI photo-reconnaissance aircraft (December 1946 - September 1947)
- Hawker Sea Fury F.10 fighter aircraft (February - July 1947)
- Fairey Firefly T.Mk 1 fighter and anti-submarine aircraft (May 1947)
- Fairey Firefly FR.Mk 4 fighter and anti-submarine aircraft (February - November 1947)
- de Havilland Vampire F.1/hooked jet fighter (1947)
- de Havilland Vampire F.1 jet fighter (September 1947 - April 1948)
- Blackburn Firebrand T.F. 5 strike fighter(October - November 1947)
- de Havilland Dominie short-haul airliner (October 1947 - March 1948)
- North American Harvard III/hooked advanced trainer (December 1947 - February 1948)
- Hawker Sea Fury FB.11 fighter aircraft (February - August 1948)
- Fairey Firefly FR.Mk 5 fighter and anti-submarine aircraft (April - May 1948)
- Gloster Meteor F.3/hooked jet fighter (1948 - 1950)
- Douglas Skyraider AEW Mk 1 airborne early warning aircraft (November 1951 - July 1952)

== Naval air stations ==
778 Naval Air Squadron operated from a number of naval air station of the Royal Navy, in the United Kingdom, a Royal Navy Fleet Carrier, a Royal Navy Escort Carrier and a Royal Air Force station:

1939 - 1948

- Royal Naval Air Station Lee-on-Solent (HMS Daedalus), Hampshire, (28 September 1939 - 6 July 1940)
- Royal Naval Air Station Arbroath (HMS Condor), Angus, (6 July 1940 - 5 March 1943)
- Royal Naval Air Station Crail (HMS Jackdaw), Fife, (5 March 1943 - 15 August 1944)
- Royal Naval Air Station Arbroath (HMS Condor), Angus, (15 August 1944 - 9 August 1945)
- Royal Naval Air Station Gosport (HMS Siskin), Hampshire, (9 August 1945 - 3 January 1946)
- Royal Naval Air Station Ford (HMS Peregrine), West Sussex, (3 January 1946 - 18 July 1947)
  - HMS Illustrious (Night Fighter Trials Unit 14 November - 12 December 1946)
- Royal Air Force Tangmere, West Sussex, (18 July 1947 - 28 May 1948)
- Royal Naval Air Station Lee-on-Solent (HMS Daedalus), Hampshire, (28 May 1948 - 16 August 1948)
- disbanded - (16 August 1948)

1951 - 1952

- Royal Naval Air Squadron Culdrose (HMS Seahawk), Cornwall, (5 November 1951 - 7 July 1952)
- became 849 Naval Air Squadron (7 July 1952)

=== 778B Flight ===
B Flight, 778 Naval Air Squadron, operated from a number of naval air station of the Royal Navy and an armed merchant cruiser:

- Royal Naval Air Station Crail (HMS Jackdaw), Fife, (26 July 1943 - 4 August 1943)
- HMS Pretoria Castle (4 August 1943 - 25 October 1943)
- Royal Naval Air Station Crail (HMS Jackdaw), Fife, (25 October 1943 - 11 November 1943)
- HMS Pretoria Castle (11 November 1943 - 14 April 1944)
  - Royal Naval Air Station Crail (HMS Jackdaw), Fife, (Detachment 16 December 1943 - 10 January 1944)
- Royal Naval Air Station Crail (HMS Jackdaw), Fife, (14 April 1944 - 6 May 1944)
- HMS Pretoria Castle (6 May 1944 - 23 May 1945)
  - Royal Naval Air Station Arbroath (HMS Condor), Angus, (Detachment 14 August -16 October 1944)
- became 777 Naval Air Squadron (23 May 1945)

== Commanding officers ==
List of commanding officers of 778 Naval Air Squadron, with date of appointment:

1939 - 1948

- Lieutenant Commander R.A. Kilroy, RN, from 28 September 1939
- Lieutenant Commander J.P.G. Bryant, RN, from 22 April 1940
- Lieutenant Commander A.J. Tillard, RN, from 6 January 1941 (KiFA 8 July 1941)
- Lieutenant Commander H.P. Bramwell, DSO, DSC, RN, from 21 July 1941
- Lieutenant Commander H.J.F. Lane, RN, from 1 March 1943
- Lieutenant Commander P.B. Schofield, RN, from 25 April 1944
- Lieutenant Commander E.M. Britton, RN, from 5 February 1945
- Lieutenant Commander(A) M.A. Lacayo, RN, from 1 October 1945
- Lieutenant Commander R.H.P. Carver, DSC, RN, from 3 July 1946
- Lieutenant Commander F.R.A. Turnbull, DSC & Bar, RN, from 16 January 1948
- disbanded - 16 August 1948

1951 - 1952

- Lieutenant J.D. Treacher, RN, from 5 November 1951
- disbanded - 7 July 1952

=== 778B Flight ===
Commanding officer of B Flight, 778 Naval Air Squadron, with date of appointment:

- Lieutenant(A) D.R. Carter, RNVR, from 26 July 1943
- became 777 Naval Air Squadron 23 May 1945

Note: Abbreviation (A) signifies Air Branch of the RN or RNVR.
