= Hastings Airport (Sierra Leone) =

- IATA: HGS; ICAO: GFHA

Summary
- Serves: Freetown
- Location: Hastings, Western Area Rural District, Sierra Leone
- Elevation AMSL: 60 ft / 18 m
- Coordinates: 8°23′40″N 13°07′42″W

Map
- Location of airport in Sierra Leone

Runways
Direction	Length		Surface
Direction	m	ft	Surface
09/27	960	3,150	Asphalt
- Sources: GCM Google Maps

Hastings Airport (IATA: HGS, ICAO: GFHA) is an airport situated in Hastings, serving Freetown, the capital city of Sierra Leone.

== Facilities ==
The airport resides at an elevation of 60 feet (18 m) above mean sea level. It has one runway designated 09/27 with an asphalt surface which is 960 metres (3,150 ft) in length.
