= HMS Pretoria Castle =

1939 Converted armed merchant cruiser to escort carrier of the Royal Navy

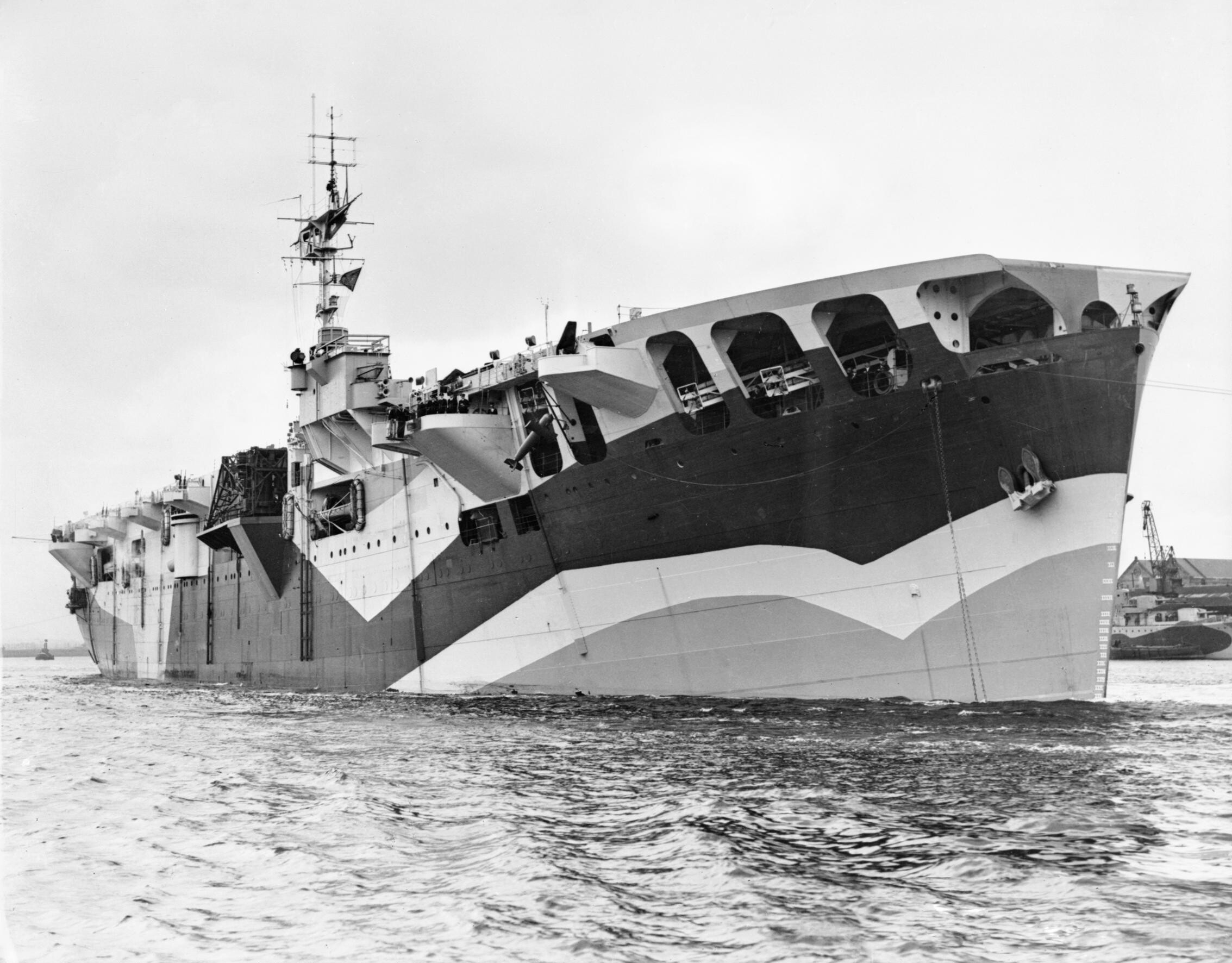
- HMS Pretoria Castle

History
- Name: Pretoria Castle
- Port of registry: (United Kingdom) London
- Builder: Harland & Wolff
- Yard number: 1006
- Launched: 12 October 1938
- Completed: 18 April 1939
- Identification: UK official number 167220; Call sign GRRJ
- Fate: Requisitioned for Royal Navy October 1939

United Kingdom
- Name: HMS Pretoria Castle
- Commissioned: 28 November 1939
- Decommissioned: August 1942
- Refit: Converted from armed merchant cruiser to escort carrier
- Identification: Pennant number F61
- Commissioned: 29 July 1943
- Decommissioned: 26 January 1946
- Fate: Sold back to the Union-Castle Line 1946
- Name: RMMV Warwick Castle
- Port of registry: (United Kingdom) London
- Acquired: 1946
- Fate: Scrapped July 1962

General characteristics
- Type: Ocean liner
- Tonnage: 17,392 GRT
- Displacement: 23,450 tons
- Length: 594 ft (181.1 m)
- Beam: 76 ft (23.2 m)
- Draught: 29 ft (8.8 m)
- Installed power: 16,000 bhp (12,000 kW); 3,284 NHP
- Propulsion: Diesel engines, twin screw
- Speed: 18 knots (33 km/h; 21 mph)
- Aircraft carried: 21

HMS Pretoria Castle (F61) was a Union-Castle ocean liner that in the Second World War was converted into a Royal Navy armed merchant cruiser, and then converted again into an escort carrier. After the war she was converted back into a passenger liner and renamed Warwick Castle.

== History ==
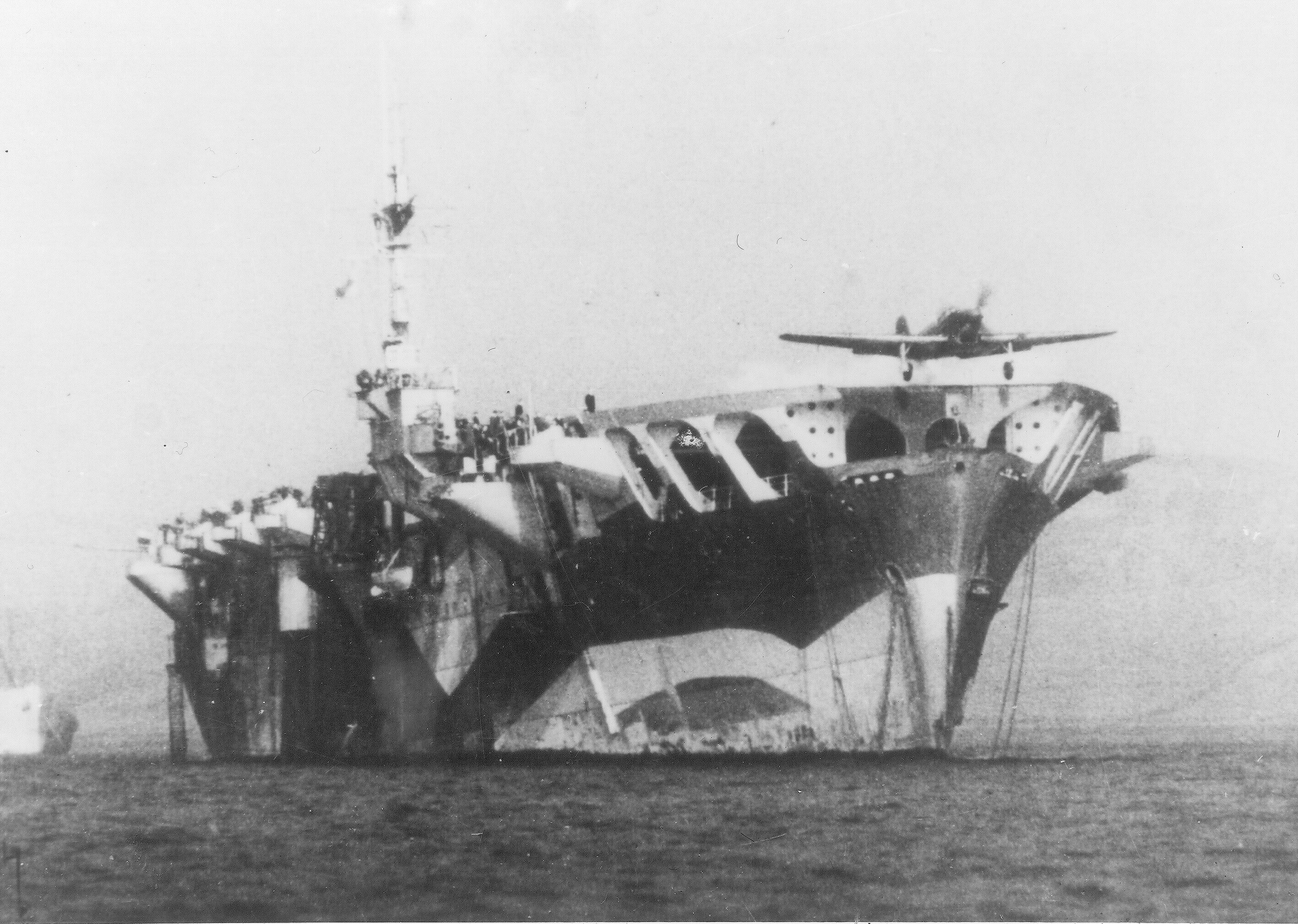
Flight training aboard the Pretoria Castle.

Harland & Wolff built Pretoria Castle in Belfast, launching her in 1938 and completing her in April 1939. The Admiralty requisitioned her for the Royal Navy in October 1939, and had her converted into an armed merchant cruiser with eight 6-inch (152 mm) and two 3-inch (76 mm) guns, entering service in November 1939. In this role she served mainly in the South Atlantic.

In July 1942 the Admiralty bought her outright for conversion to an escort carrier by Swan Hunter on Tyneside. For her new role her armament included ten Oerlikon 20 mm cannon. She was commissioned in her new role in July 1943. She operated as a trials and training carrier, seeing no active combat service.

In 1945 she twice became part of aviation history, firstly when British test pilot Captain Eric "Winkle" Brown landed a Bell Airacobra Mk. 1 on her flight deck – the first carrier landing made using an aircraft with a tricycle undercarriage, when Brown declared an emergency and was given permission to make a deck landing; a ruse which had previously been agreed with the carrier's captain, Caspar John, during initial trials for rubber deck landings planned for future carriers, and then by hosting the first ever landings and take-offs by a glider, performed by John Sproule in a Slingsby T.20 as part of research into "round-down" turbulence. On 11 August 1946, while moored on the Clyde, a Gloster Meteor was used for deck handling trials which later led to flight trials on other carriers.

After the war the ship was sold back to the Union-Castle Line in 1946 and converted back to a passenger liner, restored to its route between England and South Africa but renamed Warwick Castle. She was sold and scrapped in Barcelona in July 1962.
