= Fleet Air Arm =

Aviation arm of the Royal Navy

- Founded: 1914 (as the Royal Naval Air Service); 1924 (as the Fleet Air Arm of the Royal Air Force)
- Country: United Kingdom
- Branch: Royal Navy
- Size: 5,000 personnel c. 160 aircraft
- Part of: Naval Service
- Engagements: Second World War – 1945; Palestine – 1946–48; Malayan Emergency – 1948–60; Korean War – 1950–53; Suez Crisis / Operation Musketeer – 1956; Kuwait / Operation Vantage – 1961; Indonesian Confrontation / Borneo – 1962–66; Tanganyika / East African intervention – 1964; Aden Emergency / Radfan – 1964–67; Northern Ireland / Operation Banner – 1969–2007; Cod Wars – 1974 and 1975–76; Falklands War / Operation Corporate – 1982; Gulf War / Operation Granby – 1990–91; Bosnian War / NATO intervention – 1992–95; Kosovo War / Operation Allied Force – 1999; Sierra Leone / Operation Palliser – 2000–02; War in Afghanistan / Operation Herrick – 2001–14; Iraq War / Operation Telic – 2003–11; Libya / Operation Ellamy – 2011; Red Sea crisis / Houthi attacks – 2023–present
- Website: www.royalnavy.mod.uk/our-organisation/the-fighting-arms/fleet-air-arm

Commanders
- Commodore-in-Chief: Catherine, Princess of Wales
- Commodore Fleet Air Arm: Commodore Stuart Finn

Insignia
- White Ensign

- Roundels

- Fin flashes

Aircraft flown
- Fighter: F-35B Lightning II
- Attack helicopter: Wildcat HMA2
- Cargo helicopter: Commando Merlin HC4/4A
- Multirole helicopter: Merlin HM2
- Observation helicopter: Commando Wildcat AH1; Peregrine UAV
- Trainer helicopter: Juno HT1
- Reconnaissance: Puma AE/LE UAV
- Trainer: Avenger T1; Prefect T1; Tutor T1
- Transport: T150 UAV

The Fleet Air Arm (FAA) is the naval aviation component of the United Kingdom's Royal Navy (RN). The FAA is one of five RN fighting arms. The contemporary Fleet Air Arm provides the Royal Navy's principal aviation capabilities, operating fixed-wing and rotary-wing aircraft in support of naval operations. Its carrier aviation includes the F-35B Lightning II, providing fifth-generation carrier strike and air combat capability from the Queen Elizabeth-class aircraft carriers. Maritime aviation is centred on the Merlin HM2, providing anti-submarine warfare and airborne surveillance and control, and the Wildcat HMA2, providing maritime reconnaissance, surveillance and attack capability from Royal Navy and allied ships. The Commando Helicopter Force operates Merlin HC4/4A and Wildcat AH1 helicopters in support of the United Kingdom Commando Force, providing tactical mobility, reconnaissance and fire support for amphibious and littoral operations. Fleet Air Arm aircraft also undertake maritime security, search and rescue, humanitarian assistance and other operations in support of the Royal Navy and wider UK defence commitments.

Following the creation of the Royal Air Force (RAF) in 1918 through the merger of the Royal Naval Air Service (RNAS) and the British Army's Royal Flying Corps, naval aviation became part of the new service. The Fleet Air Arm was established within the RAF on 1 April 1924, comprising RAF units responsible for naval aviation and the operation of aircraft embarked in Royal Navy ships. Under the Inskip Award, administrative control of the Fleet Air Arm was transferred from the RAF to the Admiralty on 24 May 1939, returning naval aviation to direct Royal Navy control. During the Second World War, the Fleet Air Arm operated carrier-borne and land-based aircraft in a wide range of roles, including reconnaissance, fighter defence, anti-submarine warfare, strike and support of amphibious operations.

== History ==
=== Beginnings ===
British naval flying started in 1909, with the construction of an airship for naval duties. In 1911 the Royal Navy graduated its first aeroplane pilots at the Royal Aero Club flying ground near Eastchurch, Isle of Sheppey, under the tutelage of pioneer aviator George Bertram Cockburn. In May 1912, naval and army aviation were combined to become the Royal Flying Corps (RFC). The Naval Wing of the RFC lasted until July 1914 when the Royal Navy reformed its air branch, under the Air Department of the Admiralty, naming it the Royal Naval Air Service (RNAS).

By the outbreak of the First World War, in August 1914, the RNAS had more aircraft under its control than the remaining RFC. The roles of the RNAS were fleet reconnaissance, patrolling coasts for enemy ships and submarines, attacking enemy coastal territory and defending Britain from enemy air raids, along with deployment along the Western Front. In April 1918 the RNAS, which at this time had 67,000 officers and men, 2,949 aircraft, 103 airships and 126 coastal stations, merged with the RFC to form the Royal Air Force (RAF).

=== Fleet Air Arm ===
On 1 April 1924, the Fleet Air Arm of the Royal Air Force was formed, encompassing those RAF units that normally embarked on aircraft carriers and fighting ships. The year was significant for British naval aviation as only weeks before the founding of the Fleet Air Arm, the Royal Navy had commissioned HMS Hermes, the world's first ship to be designed and built as an aircraft carrier. Over the following months RAF Fleet Air Arm Fairey IIID reconnaissance biplanes operated off Hermes, conducting flying trials.

On 24 May 1939, under the terms of the Inskip Award of 1937, administrative control of the Fleet Air Arm was transferred from the Royal Air Force to the Admiralty, restoring full naval control of ship-borne aviation.

At the onset of the Second World War, the Fleet Air Arm consisted of 20 squadrons with 232 first-line aircraft and 191 trainers. By the end of the war, the strength of the Fleet Air Arm had expanded to 59 aircraft carriers, about 3,700 aircraft, approximately 72,000 officers and men and 56 naval air stations.

Throughout the Second World War, the Fleet Air Arm mainly operated a wide range of aircraft, including fighter aircraft, torpedo bombers and reconnaissance aircraft.

During the Norwegian Campaign in April–June 1940, Fleet Air Arm aircraft from the aircraft carriers HMS Ark Royal, HMS Glorious and HMS Furious provided reconnaissance, fighter defence and offensive air support, while the carriers also enabled the Royal Air Force's Gloster Gladiators of 263 Squadron and Hawker Hurricanes of 46 Squadron to be deployed to Norway. The campaign demonstrated both the flexibility of carrier aviation in projecting air power and reinforcing land-based forces; and conversely its limits when British carriers operated within range of German land-based air power; the loss of HMS Glorious on 8 June while evacuating RAF aircraft emphasised the vulnerability of carriers without adequate fighter protection.

Following the Dunkirk evacuation and as the Battle of Britain began, the Fleet Air Arm was called upon to reinforce RAF Fighter Command, which was experiencing a shortage of fighter pilots. Fleet Air Arm personnel were employed either individually in RAF fighter squadrons or through the deployment of complete Fleet Air Arm squadrons under RAF operational control. Among these were 804 and 808 Naval Air Squadrons, while other Fleet Air Arm fighter pilots and observers served alongside RAF personnel. Equipped with Gloster Sea Gladiators, 804 Squadron undertook the defence of naval dockyards during the Battle of Britain.

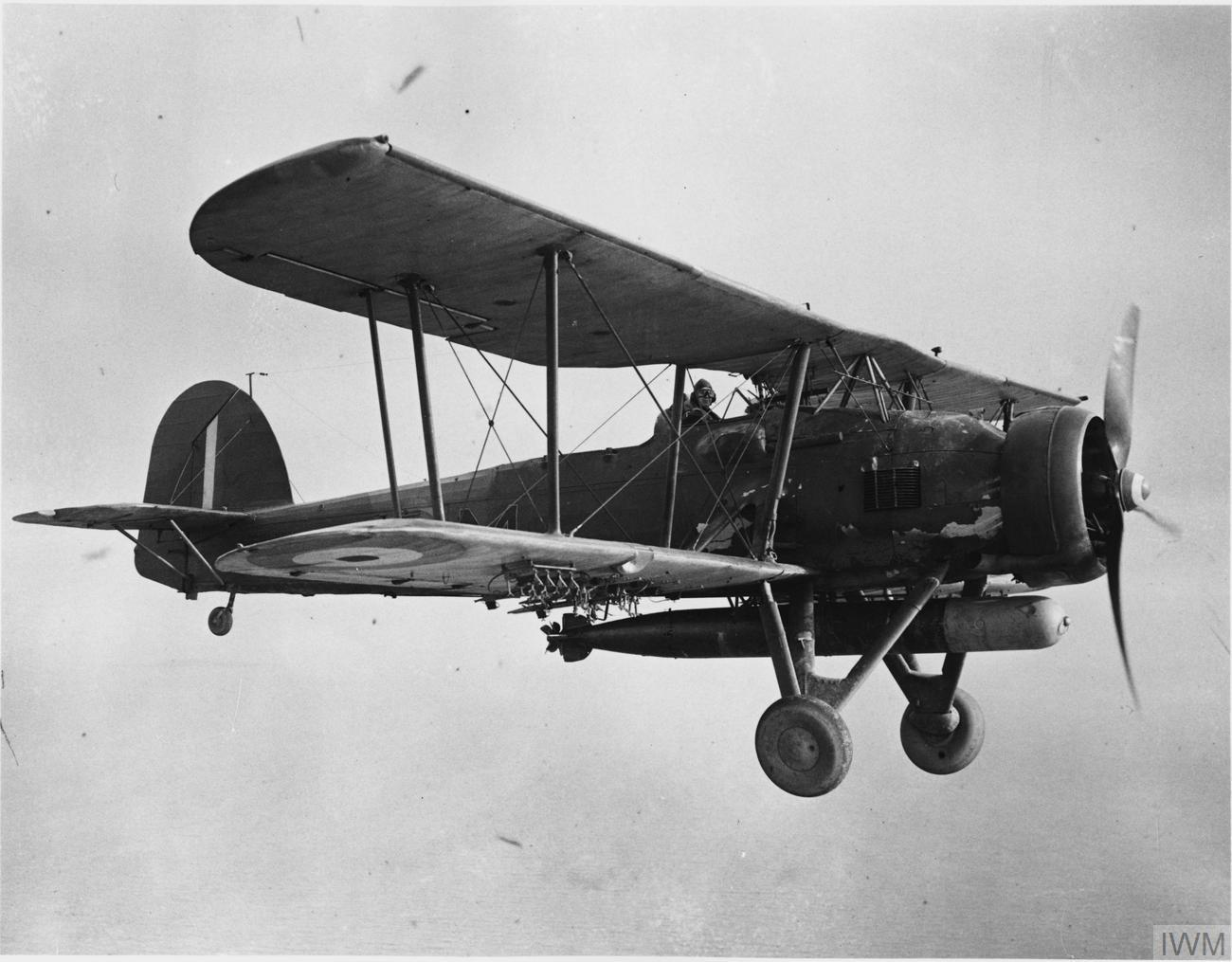
Fairey Swordfish I

In November 1940, the Fleet Air Arm demonstrated the offensive potential of carrier aviation in Operation Judgement, the attack on the Italian fleet at Taranto. On the night of 11–12 November, 21 Fairey Swordfish of the Fleet Air Arm, operating from HMS Illustrious, attacked the Italian fleet at anchor, sinking the battleship Conte di Cavour and heavily damaging Littorio and Duilio and a heavy cruiser. The raid effectivley halved the strength of the Italian battle fleet and demonstrated for the first time in combat the ability of carrier-borne aircraft to inflict decisive damage on a major fleet in harbour.

At the Battle of Cape Matapan in March 1941, Fleet Air Arm aircraft from HMS Formidable played a decisive role in the attack the Italian fleet. A Fairey Albacore torpedo attack damaged and temporarily immobilised the Italian battleship Vittorio Veneto, enabling the British fleet to pursue the withdrawing Italians, while a subsequent strike torpedoed the heavy cruiser Pola, whose immobilisation led the Italian command to detach Zara, Fiume and destroyers to her assistance, allowing the British battleships to intercept and destroy them in the subsequent night action.

The Fleet Air Arm also played a decisive role in the destruction of the German battleship Bismarck in May 1941. 820 Naval Air Squadron, operating Fairey Swordfish torpedo bombers from HMS Ark Royal, attacked Bismarck on the evening of 26 May. A torpedo hit the stern and jammed the battleship’s rudders, leaving her largely unable to manoeuvre and preventing her escape towards occupied France. Bismarck was intercepted and sunk by Royal Navy surface forces the following morning.

On 30 July 1941, Fleet Air Arm aircraft from the aircraft carriers HMS Victorious and HMS Furious attacked German shipping and installations at Kirkenes and Petsamo, during Operation EF, in support of the Soviet Union following Operation Barbarossa the German invasion of the USSR. The raids achieved limited material results and at heavy cost, with twelve Fairey Albacores and four Fairey Fulmars lost, but the Admiralty considered the attacks to have had a significant effect on German morale and dispositions, demonstrating the Fleet Air Arm's ability to project carrier-based air power into the Arctic while providing an immediate demonstration of British support for its new Soviet ally.

For the Malta convoys of 1941, Fleet Air Arm aircraft from HMS Ark Royal provided fighter protection for the convoys while also reinforcing Malta's air strength. During Operation Substance in July, its Fairey Fulmars engaged Italian torpedo bombers attacking Convoy GM 1, while six Fairey Swordfish were flown off to reinforce Malta; in Operation Halberd in September, the carriers Fairey Fulmars again provided air defence, while its aircraft conducted reconnaissance and attacks against the Italian fleet.

During the Channel Dash on 12 February 1942, six Fairey Swordfish of 825 Naval Air Squadron attacked the German battlecruisers Scharnhorst and Gneisenau and heavy cruiser Prinz Eugen as they broke through the English Channel from Brest to Germany. All six Fairey Swordfish were shot down by German fighters and anti-aircraft fire, with 13 of the 18 aircrew killed; although some aircraft launched their torpedoes, none struck the German ships. Lieutenant Commander Eugene Esmonde, who led the attack, was posthumously awarded the Victoria Cross for his actions.

During Operation Pedestal in August 1942, Fleet Air Arm fighter aircraft from the aircraft carriers HMS Eagle, HMS Indomitable and HMS Victorious provided air defence against sustained German and Italian attacks, with HMS Indomitable’s fighters alone destroying 28 Axis aircraft and probably destroying a further six. Despite the loss of HMS Eagle, the fighters helped shield the surviving ships of the convoy, enabling several merchant vessels, including the oil tanker SS Ohio, to reach Malta and deliver vital supplies.

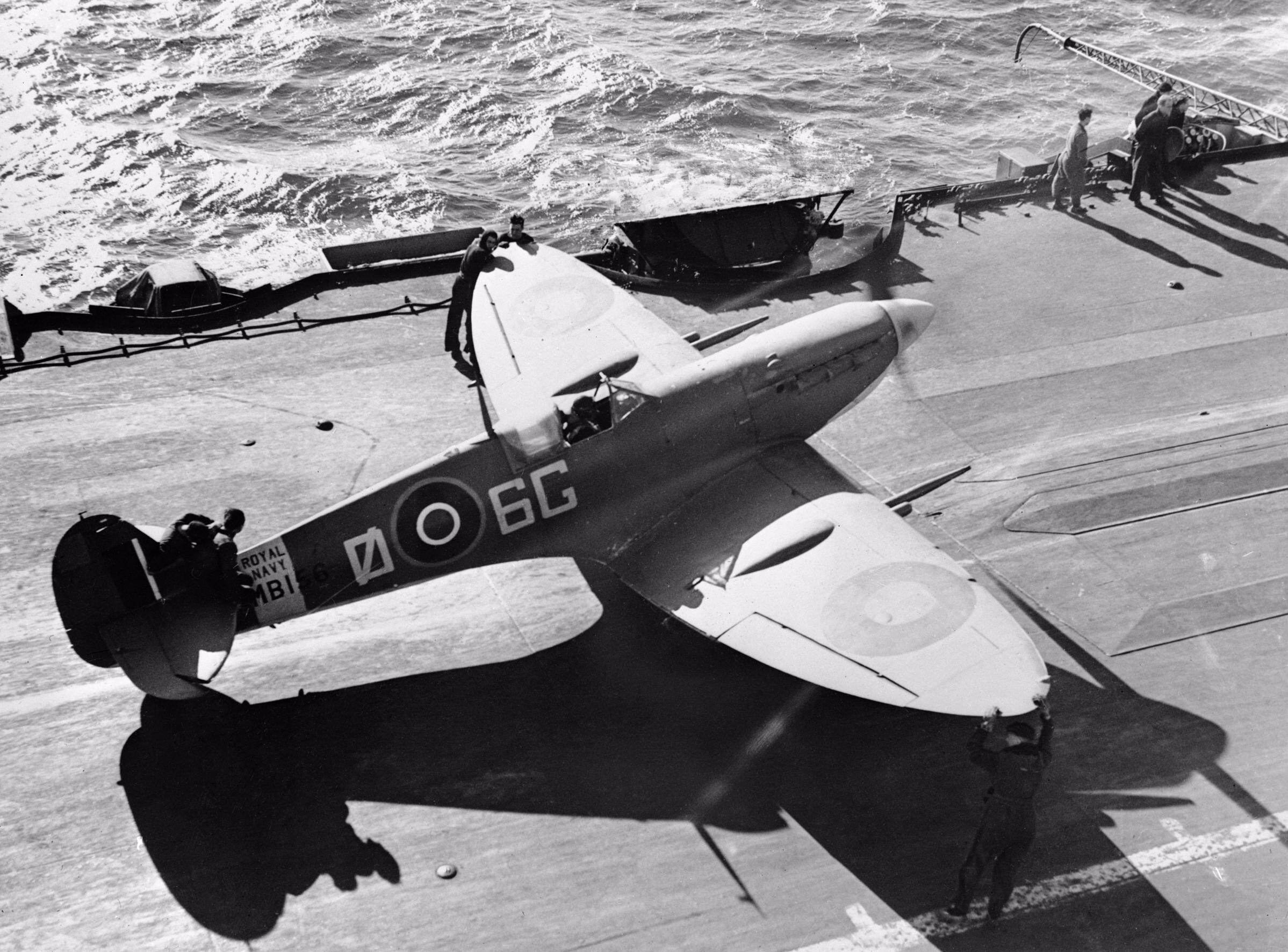
Supermarine Seafire Mk IIc of 885 Naval Air Squadron on the flight deck of HMS Formidable in the Mediterranean, December 1942

Operation Torch took place in November 1942 and Fleet Air Arm aircraft from carriers including HMS Furious, HMS Formidable, HMS Victorious and HMS Argus provided fighter cover, reconnaissance and offensive air support for the Allied landings in North Africa, attacking Vichy airfields and coastal defences.The operation was also significant as the Supermarine Seafire's first combat deployment, establishing the navalised fighter in operational service with the Fleet Air Arm.

In British home waters and the Atlantic, RAF Coastal Command operated alongside the Royal Navy against Axis submarines and shipping, using long-range patrol aircraft and flying boats for maritime reconnaissance and anti-submarine warfare, and land-based torpedo bombers and fighter-bombers for offensive operations.

During the Battle of the Atlantic, the Fleet Air Arm's role in anti-submarine warfare expanded significantly in 1943, as increasing numbers of its aircraft operated from escort carriers and Merchant Aircraft Carriers to provide air support for convoys. FAA aircraft extended the reach of convoy air patrols and, equipped with airborne radar and anti-submarine weapons, detected and attacked U-boats and supported surface escorts, making an increasingly important contribution to the defence of Allied maritime trade and the closing of the mid-Atlantic gap.

Grumman Martlet on HMS Formidable

Fleet Air Arm Supermarine Seafires and Grumman Martlets operated from the aircraft carriers HMS Indomitable and HMS Formidable in support of Allied invasion of Sicily, Operation Husky, providing fighter cover for the invasion fleet and helping protect the landings from Axis air and naval attack. The operation demonstrated the growing importance of carrier aviation in major amphibious operations, although the principal air support for forces ashore was provided by the Mediterranean Air Command.

Fleet Air Arm Supermarine Seafires provided fighter cover for the invasion fleet and beachhead during Operation Avalanche, the Allied landings at Salerno, Campania in southern Italy, in September 1943. Five Royal Navy aircraft carriers operated 109 Supermarine Seafires, flying standing patrols over the landing area while land-based fighters from Sicily were limited by range; the Supermarine Seafires were particularly important during the first days of the assault, when German air attacks were frequent and suitable airfields ashore had not yet been secured.

From 1943, Fleet Air Arm squadrons embarked in the Royal Navy's fleet, light fleet and escort carriers were increasingly organised into naval air wings, each normally comprising several squadrons and designated according to its principal role. The principal formations were in Naval Fighter Wings and Naval Torpedo, Bomber and Reconnaissance (TBR) Wings, with the wings providing an organisational framework for the operation of carrier-borne aircraft during the later war. A number of Wings were established from October 1943, while others were subsequently formed as the Fleet Air Arm’s operational requirements developed. A complete list of the Royal Navy’s wartime aircraft wings, including their constituent squadrons, commanders, formations and periods of service, is given in the List of aircraft wings of the Royal Navy.

In Operation Tungsten on 3 April 1944, Fleet Air Arm aircraft from five aircraft carriers mounted a large-scale carrier strike against the German battleship Tirpitz in Altafjord, Norway. Fairey Barracudas, escorted by Vought Corsairs, Grumman Hellcats and Grumman Wildcat fighters, achieved surprise and inflicted numerous bomb hits, killing and wounding hundreds of crew and rendering Tirpitz effectivley unable to operate at sea for several months. The operation demonstrated the Fleet Air Arm's ability to deliver a concentrated carrier-borne attack against a major German capital ship without requiring the Home Fleet's battleships to engage it directly.

Vought Corsair on the deck of HMS Illustrious

In January 1945, during Operation Meridian, Fleet Air Arm aircraft from the aircraft carriers HMS Indomitable, HMS Indefatigable, HMS Victorious and HMS Illustrious attacked the Japanese oil refineries at Palembang in Sumatra. The strikes demonstrated the Fleet Air Arm's development into a powerful carrier-strike force capable of projecting concentrated air power deep into enemy-held territory against strategically important industrial targets, severely disrupting Japanese oil production and aviation-fuel supplies.

The Fleet Air Arm's contribution to Operation Iceberg demonstrated the maturity of Royal Navy carrier aviation as a sustained strike force. Operating as part of Task Force 57, Royal Navy aircraft carriers repeatedly attacked Japanese airfields in the Sakishima Islands to prevent them being used to stage attacks against the Allied invasion of Okinawa. Operating at considerable range from its forward bases, the force maintained a continuous cycle of strikes and replenishment at sea, with its carriers embarking more than 200 aircraft during the initial phase. The operation demonstrated the Fleet Air Arm's ability to project and sustain concentrated air power over an extended period as an integral component of a major fleet offensive.

During the Second World War, the aircraft carrier moved to the centre of Royal Navy strategy and increasingly assumed the role of the capital ship, while naval aviation became fundamental to the fleet. The Fleet Air Arm's highest-scoring fighter ace was Commander Stanley Orr, who was credited with 17 victories. The highest-scoring Royal Marine fighter ace was Commander Ronald Cuthbert Hay, with 13 victories. During the war, 26 Royal Marine officers and four other ranks served as pilots with the Fleet Air Arm.

Following the End of World War II in Europe, Fleet Air Arm squadrons embarked in the Royal Navy’s fleet and light fleet aircraft carriers were reorganised into Carrier Air Groups, following United States Navy practice, for operations against Japan in the Pacific. The first groups were formed on 30 June 1945, with each group bringing together squadrons of different aircraft types to provide a balanced carrier air group. Nine groups were established during 1945, with a further reserve group formed in August, although several saw only limited service before the Surrender of Japan. The composition, carriers and operational histories of these formations are detailed in the List of Fleet Air Arm groups.

The Fleet Air Arm began experimenting with helicopters towards the end of the Second World War, initially using the Sikorsky R-4 , known as the Hoverfly, to investigate the potential of rotary-wing aircraft for naval operations. R-4s were allocated to Fleet Air Arm units from 1944, with 771 Naval Air Squadron operating the type from 1945 for helicopter trials. The experiments demonstrated the potential advantages of the helicopter for naval operations, particularly its ability to operate without a runway and from the restricted deck space of a ship. By 1947, the trials had demonstrated sufficient potential for the Navy to establish a permanent helicopter organisation, 705 Naval Air Squadron was recommissioned at RNAS Lee-on-Solent flying the Hoverfly and an instructor from the squadron carried out the first helicopter deck landing on a Royal Navy warship, HMS Vanguard.

The formation of 705 Squadron marked the evolution from experimental helicopter trials to an established Fleet Air Arm capability dedicated to developing the naval use of rotary-wing aircraft.

=== Korean War ===
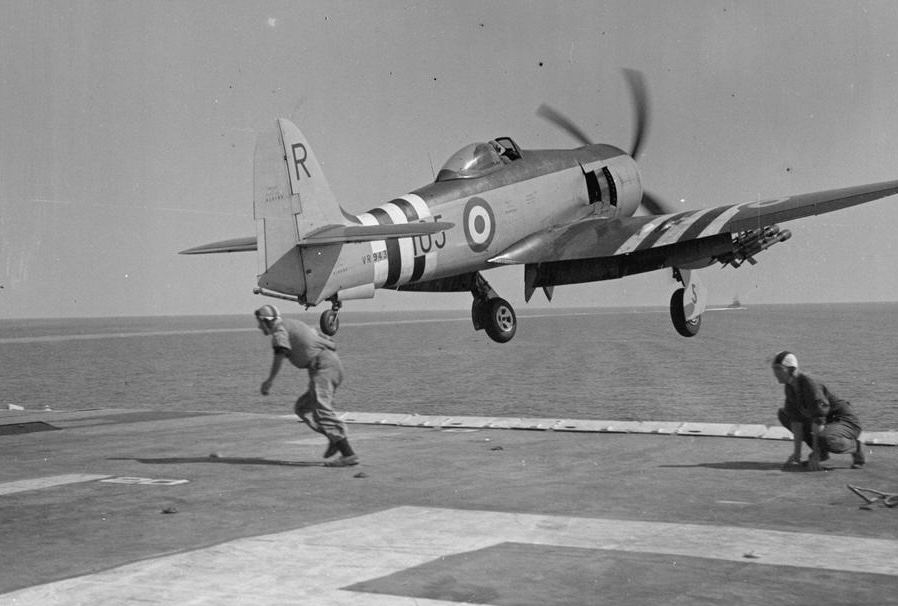
Hawker Sea Fury of 804 Squadron launched off HMS Glory during the Korean War, June 1951

The Fleet Air Arm made a sustained contribution to the United Nations war effort during the Korean War (1950–1953). HMS Triumph was among the first Allied aircraft carriers to conduct combat operations, with its Supermarine Seafires and Fairey Fireflies striking North Korean airfields, supply lines and transportation facilities on 3 July 1950. HMS Triumph was subsequently followed by the light fleet carriers HMS Theseus, HMS Glory and HMS Ocean, whose aircraft conducted close air support, interdiction, armed reconnaissance and naval support missions. Fleet Air Arm Hawker Sea Furies proved particularly effective in the strike role, with HMS Theseus' aircraft flying more than 3,400 sorties during their 1950–51 deployment.

On 9 August 1952, four Hawker Sea Furies of 802 Naval Air Squadron from HMS Ocean engaged eight MiG-15 jet fighters over Korea, in one of the most notable piston-versus-jet engagements of the war; one MiG-15 was destroyed, with the Royal Navy crediting the victory to Lieutenant Peter "Hoagy" Carmichael, although subsequent research has disputed the individual attribution. The encounter demonstrated the effectiveness of the Hawker Sea Fury even against contemporary jet fighters, while the wider Korean War exposed the limitations of piston-engined naval aircraft and reinforced the Fleet Air Arm's transition towards jet-powered carrier aviation.

At around the same time the Fleet Air Arm’s involvement in the Malayan Emergency consisted solely of 848 Naval Air Squadron, which deployed Westland Whirlwind HAR.21 helicopters in 1952–53 to provide troop lift, supply transport, reconnaissance, and casualty evacuation in support of jungle operations.

=== Jet era ===
The Fleet Air Arm began the transition to jet aircraft in the late 1940s, with the de Havilland Sea Vampire used for carrier trials from 1945, but piston-engined aircraft remained predominant during the Korean War. The Supermarine Attacker entered frontline service in 1951 as the Fleet Air Arm's first operational jet fighter, but its introduction was initially limited. A more substantial transition followed from 1953, when the Hawker Sea Hawk entered squadron service and progressively replaced the Hawke Sea Fury and Supermarine Attacker aircraft. By the mid-1950s, jet aircraft had become the standard for the Fleet Air Arm's frontline fighter and strike squadrons.

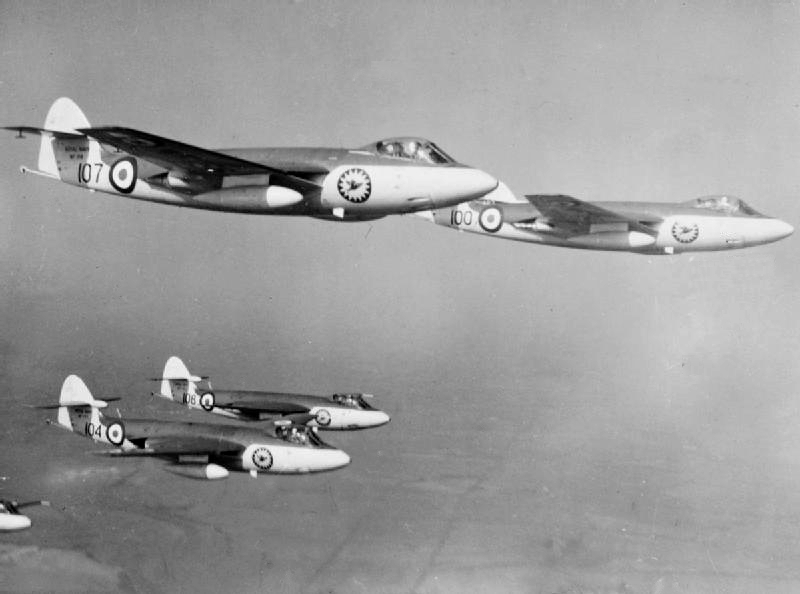
Hawker Sea Hawks of 898 Squadron, 1954

As the transition to jet-powered carrier aviation accelerated during the Korean War, the increasing size, weight and landing speeds of jet aircraft exposed the limitations of the Second World War-era straight flight deck. The Royal Navy responded with a series of innovations that transformed carrier operations. In 1951, Royal Navy Captain, Dennis Cambell, proposed an angled landing area, and in 1952 HMS Triumph was modified to conduct trials of an angled flight deck. This allowed aircraft that missed the arresting wires to make a "bolter" rather than risk colliding with aircraft or barriers parked ahead of the landing area. The trials were successful, and the United States Navy subsequently tested the concept aboard USS Antietam in 1953.

Other British developments addressed the problems of launching and recovering increasingly heavy and fast aircraft. The steam catapult, developed by the Royal Navy and successfully demonstrated aboard the modified aircraft repair ship HMS Perseus, was demonstrated to the United States Navy in trials between December 1951 and February 1952 and subsequently adopted for American carriers. In 1951, Royal Navy Commander Nicholas Goodhart developed the mirror landing system, providing pilots with a visual reference for maintaining the correct glide path during carrier approaches; it was subsequently developed into the Fresnel lens optical landing system. Together, the angled flight deck, steam catapult and optical landing aid enabled carriers to operate high-performance jet aircraft with greater safety and effectiveness, becoming fundamental features of modern carrier aviation.

=== Establishment of naval helicopter operations ===
The Westland Dragonfly entered Fleet Air Arm service from 1950 and was employed for search and rescue, plane guard and communications duties. The type became increasingly integrated into carrier operations, with the first Westland Dragonfly search-and-rescue unit embarking in HMS Indomitable in January 1951 and a second unit subsequently embarking in HMS Glory. The Westland Dragonfly thereby established the helicopter as an important support element of Fleet Air Arm carrier aviation, particularly for the recovery of aircrew and plane guard duties.

Westland Dragonfly

The Westland Dragonfly's utility was demonstrated particularly clearly through search and rescue and disaster-relief operations. In January 1953, twelve Westland Dragonflies from 705 Naval Air Squadron were deployed to assist with severe flooding in East Anglia and the Netherlands, rescuing more than 840 people. During the same period, the larger Westland Whirlwind extended the Fleet Air Arm's helicopter capability beyond the Dragonfly's established rescue and plane-guard roles, providing greater capacity for transport and utility operations and a platform for the development of specialised naval applications.

The Westland Whirlwind also enabled the Fleet Air Arm to develop a dedicated anti-submarine helicopter capability. In September 1953, 706 Naval Air Squadron was re-formed as an anti-submarine helicopter squadron with Westland Whirlwind HAS.22s, undertaking trials of helicopter-borne sonar equipment. The squadron conducted shipboard trials aboard HMS Perseus and exercises with anti-submarine frigates before completing its trials in March 1954 and being disbanded and re-designated as 845 Naval Air Squadron. 845 Squadron subsequently became the Fleet Air Arm's first anti-submarine helicopter squadron, introducing Westland Whirlwinds in 1957. By the end of the decade, helicopters had therefore developed from primarily rescue and utility aircraft into an established component of the Fleet Air Arm's anti-submarine warfare capability.

=== Suez Crisis ===
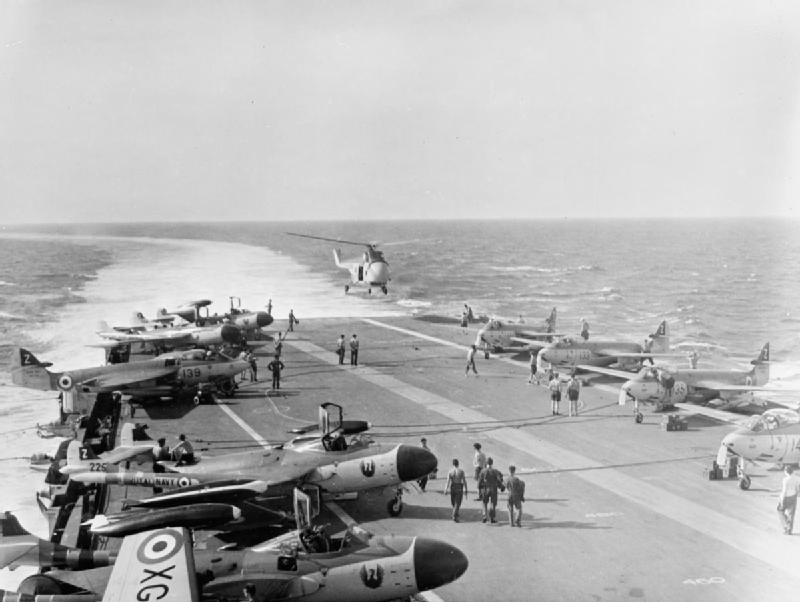
HMS Albion during Suez Crisis 1956. Visible on deck are de Havilland Sea Venoms of 809 Squadron and Hawker Sea Hawks from 800 and 802 Squadrons

Operation Musketeer, the Anglo-French intervention during the Suez Crisis, demonstrated the Fleet Air Arm's emergence as a highly capable post-war carrier force. Aircraft from the fleet carriers HMS Albion, HMS Bulwark and HMS Eagle conducted sustained offensive operations against Egyptian airfields and ground targets, while also providing air defence and support for the invasion force. The three carriers flew 1,614 sorties during the operation, including 1,164 offensive sorties, damaging or destroying 289 aircraft and 150 armoured vehicles and sinking six E-boats. Naval aircraft were responsible for destroying about 60 per cent of the Egyptian aircraft lost, while the Hawker Sea Hawks and de Havilland Sea Venoms averaged 2.8 sorties per operational day, compared with 1.4 for land-based ground-attack aircraft. Their proximity to Port Said enabled carrier aircraft to remain over targets for longer, carry full weapons loads and rapidly adapt their armament and tactics to changing operational requirements. The Fleet Air Arm therefore provided a substantial proportion of the offensive air power used to suppress Egyptian air opposition and prepare the way for the amphibious assault.

Musketeer also demonstrated the versatility of the aircraft carrier as a mobile air base and the Fleet Air Arm's ability to integrate strike, air defence, reconnaissance and close air support within a single naval force. Carrier aircraft formed the mainstay of the "cab rank" system used to provide responsive air support to the airborne and seaborne landings, while the destruction of the Egyptian Air Force allowed the airborne assault to proceed ahead of the amphibious landing. On 6 November, helicopters of 845 Naval Air Squadron operating from HMS Theseus transported 45 Commando from the carrier to Port Said, providing an early demonstration of shipborne helicopters being used to deliver an assault force directly from sea to shore. Together, the sustained carrier strike campaign and the helicopter assault demonstrated the Fleet Air Arm's transition from its wartime role into a flexible post-war force capable of projecting concentrated air power, suppressing enemy air forces and providing responsive support for a major amphibious operation from carriers operating offshore.

=== Cold War modernisation ===
The Fleet Air Arm entered the late 1950s undergoing a rapid transformation from its predominantly subsonic, gun-armed post-war force into a modern carrier air arm centred on guided weapons, radar and high-performance jet aircraft. The Suez Crisis of 1956 demonstrated the continuing value of naval aviation for British expeditionary operations, while the subsequent introduction of the Supermarine Scimitar and de Havilland Sea Vixen marked a major technological advance. HMS Victorious conducted extensive trials of both aircraft in 1958, alongside the development of the Type 984 carrier-borne radar and the Firestreak infrared homing air-to-air missile. The de Havilland Sea Vixen subsequently became the Fleet Air Arm's principal all-weather fleet-defence fighter, while increasingly sophisticated exercises tested the ability of British carriers to operate against large-scale air attack in the nuclear age. Exercises such as Marjex, Rip Tide and Swordthrust rehearsed carrier warfare against air and submarine threats, including scenarios involving nuclear conflict, demonstrating the increasingly integrated use of radar, fighter direction and missile-armed aircraft.

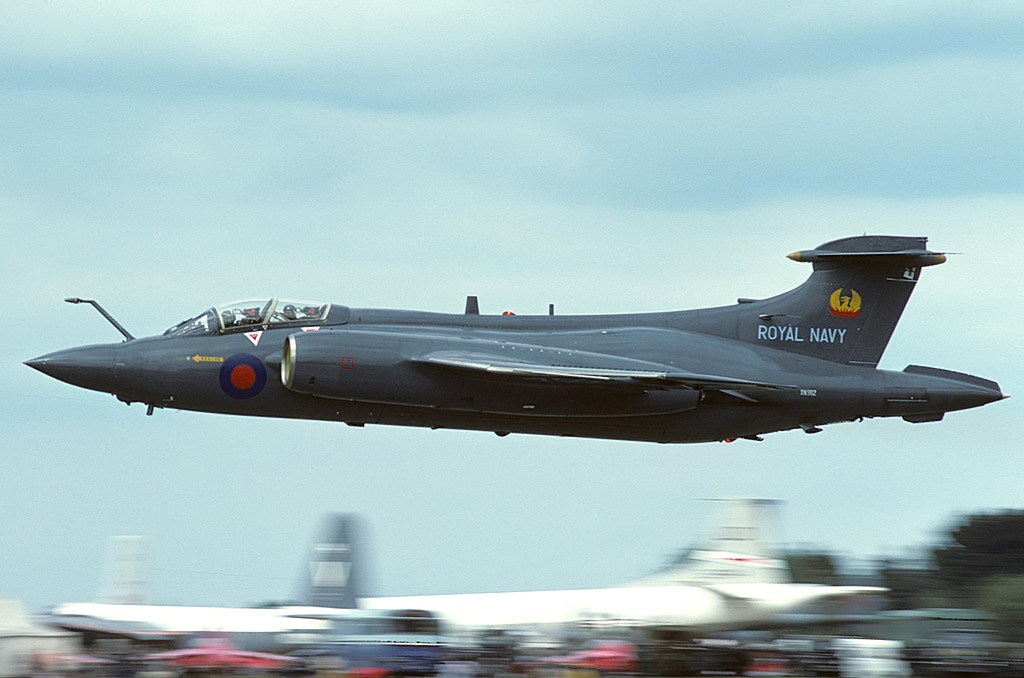
Blackburn Buccaneer S2A

At the same time, the Fleet Air Arm was developing a powerful carrier-strike capability. The Blackburn Buccaneer, designed for high-speed, low-level penetration beneath enemy radar, entered Fleet Air Arm service with 801 Naval Air Squadron in July 1962, providing a purpose-built carrier strike aircraft to succeed the Supermarine Scimitar. The combination of de Havilland Sea Vixen fleet defence, Blackburn Buccaneer strike aircraft, Fairey Gannet airborne early warning and increasingly capable aircraft carrier radar and fighter-direction systems, gave the Royal Navy a sophisticated Cold War carrier force. Its continuing operational utility was demonstrated during the 1961 Kuwait crisis, when HMS Victorious was diverted to the Persian Gulf and her de Havilland Sea Vixens provided the principal carrier air-defence capability, while her Supermarine Scimitars provided close air support; HMS Bulwark meanwhile deployed Royal Marines and used its helicopters in support of the operation.

By 1962, therefore, the Fleet Air Arm had developed into a highly capable Cold War carrier force able to combine fleet air defence, airborne early warning, anti-submarine warfare and long-range strike with the ability to deploy rapidly in support of British interests overseas.

=== Expansion of naval helicopter aviation ===
The 1960s saw a major expansion in the Fleet Air Arm's use of rotary-wing aircraft, as turbine-powered helicopters became increasingly important to naval operations. The Westland Wessex HAS.1 entered Fleet Air Arm service in 1961, providing a substantial improvement in anti-submarine warfare capability through its turbine power, automatic flight stabilisation and dipping sonar. The type equipped a growing number of anti-submarine squadrons, while its ability to operate from aircraft carriers and other larger warships established the helicopter as an integral component of the fleet's anti-submarine screen.

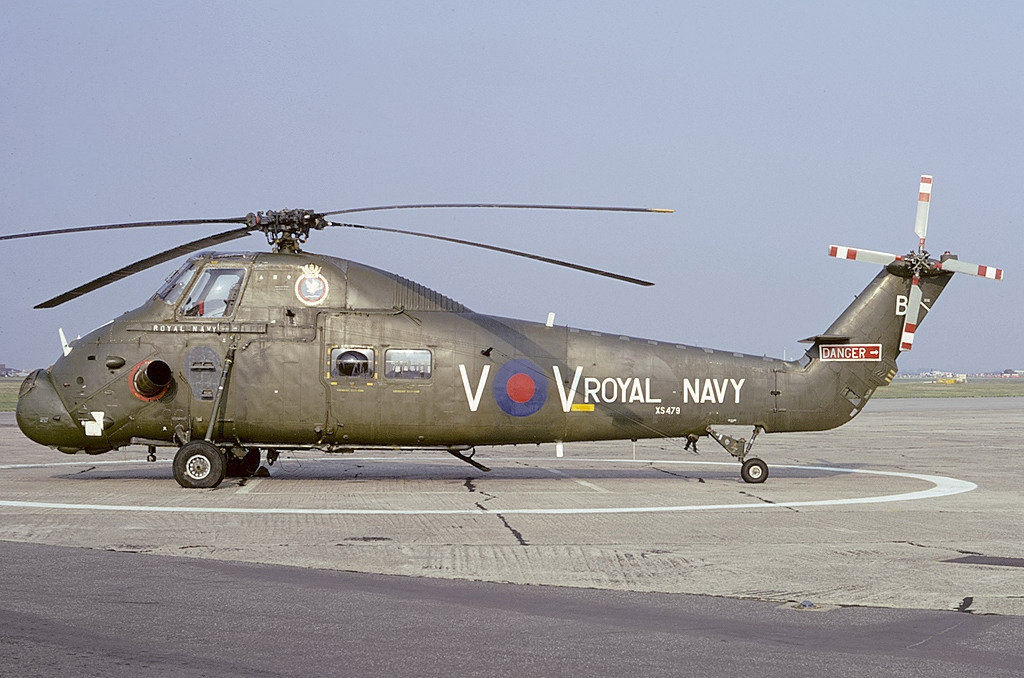
Westland Wessex HU5, 848 Squadron

During the middle of the decade, the Westland Wessex was increasingly employed in roles beyond anti-submarine warfare. The Westland Wessex HU.5 became the principal Commando support helicopter, providing the Fleet Air Arm with a dedicated means of transporting Royal Marines and their equipment from ships to shore. The reformation of 848 Naval Air Squadron at RNAS Culdrose in May 1964 with eighteen Westland Wessex HU.5s marked the expansion of this capability, while Westland Wessex helicopters were employed extensively during British operations in Borneo during the Indonesia–Malaysia confrontation. The helicopter was consequently becoming an important element of both naval aviation and amphibious warfare, capable of moving troops, equipment and casualties over terrain where conventional transport was difficult or impossible.

Westland Wasp

The introduction of the Westland Wasp in 1964 extended the Fleet Air Arm's helicopter capability to the smaller ships of the fleet. Operated principally by 829 Naval Air Squadron, Westland Wasp detachments were embarked in frigates and other small vessels, providing an airborne anti-submarine weapon and reconnaissance capability. The Westland Wasp formed part of the Admiralty's Manned Anti-Submarine Torpedo-Carrying Helicopter concept, allowing a ship or helicopter to detect a submarine while the helicopter delivered a homing torpedo against the contact. Its ability to operate from frigates represented an important expansion of naval aviation, bringing an embarked helicopter capability to a much larger proportion of the surface fleet.

By the latter half of the decade, improvements to the Westland Wessex further increased its importance to the Fleet Air Arm. The Westland Wessex HAS.3 entered frontline service in 1967 with improved avionics, greater engine power, an improved sonar and a distinctive dorsal radar installation, providing a more capable maritime tactical helicopter for anti-submarine and anti-surface warfare. At the same time, the limitations of the Westland Wessex in endurance, payload and the separation of the search and attack functions demonstrated the need for a larger and more capable helicopter.

The resulting Westland Sea King represented the next stage in the development of Fleet Air Arm rotary-wing aviation. The Royal Navy ordered sixty aircraft from Westland in 1966 to replace the Westland Wessex in the anti-submarine role, and the first British-built Westland Sea King HAS.1 flew in May 1969. The aircraft subsequently entered Fleet Air Arm service for trials with 700 Naval Air Squadron, combining substantially greater size, endurance and payload with the sensors and weapons required for modern anti-submarine warfare.

By the end of the 1960s, rotary-wing aviation had consequently become a central element of the Fleet Air Arm. Wessex helicopters provided fleet anti-submarine warfare and Commando support, Westland Wasp detachments extended aviation to frigates and other small ships, and the arrival of the Westland Sea King established the basis for a new generation of long-range naval helicopter operations. The decade had transformed the helicopter from a developing naval capability into an essential component of the Fleet Air Arm's contribution to anti-submarine warfare, amphibious operations and fleet support.

=== Phantom and the end of conventional carrier aviation ===
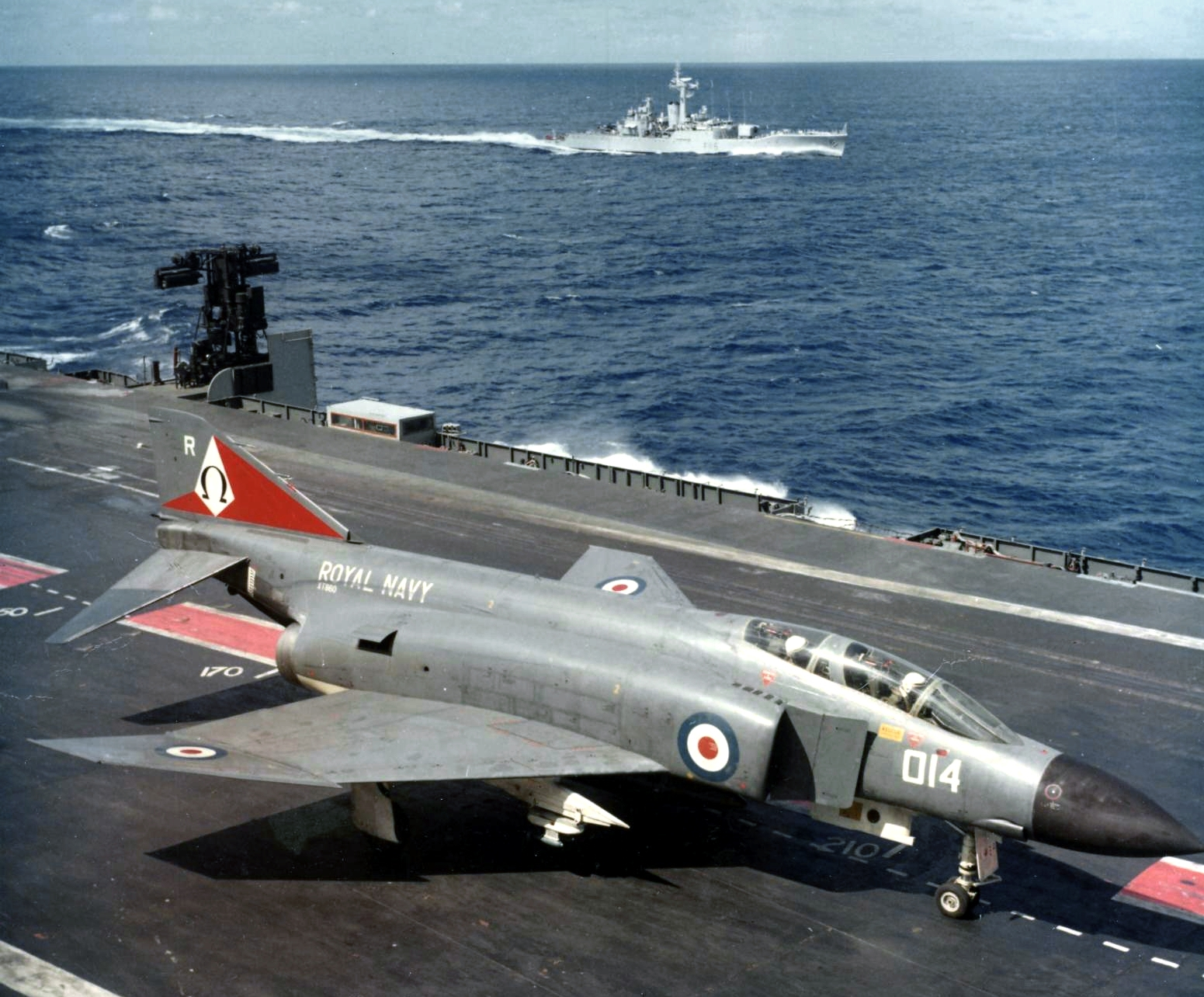
Phantom FG.1 of 892 Squadron aboard HMS Ark Royal in 1972

The McDonnell Douglas Phantom entered operational service from HMS Ark Royal in 1970, providing the Fleet Air Arm with a supersonic, radar-equipped, missile-armed fighter capable of fleet air defence at a level substantially beyond that of the de Havilland Sea Vixen. Its introduction nevertheless coincided with the progressive withdrawal of the Royal Navy's conventional carriers. HMS Victorious was withdrawn in 1969, HMS Hermes was subsequently converted for commando operations, and HMS Eagle was withdrawn in 1972 without receiving her planned McDonnell Douglas Phantom conversion.

HMS Ark Royal consequently became the Fleet Air Arm's sole conventional fixed-wing carrier, operating 892 Naval Air Squadron McDonnell Douglas Phantoms alongside Blackburn Buccaneer strike aircraft and other naval aviation assets during the 1970s, including NATO and Royal Navy exercises and overseas deployments. The retention of the carrier and the McDonnell Douglas Phantom force represented the culmination of the Royal Navy's post-war investment in high-performance carrier aviation, but its continuation was increasingly difficult to reconcile with defence policy and the withdrawal of British forces from east of Suez. When HMS Ark Royal paid off in December 1978, the Fleet Air Arm lost its last conventional carrier capable of operating fixed-wing aircraft. On 27 November 1978, a Phantom FG.1 of 892 Squadron made the final catapult launch from a Royal Navy aircraft carrier; the squadron disbanded the following month and its aircraft were transferred to the Royal Air Force. The McDonnell Douglas Phantom therefore represented both the technological high point of the Fleet Air Arm's conventional carrier fighter force and the final stage of an era that had begun with the post-war development of the modern Royal Navy aircraft carrier.

Defence cuts across the British armed forces during the 1960s and 1970s led to the withdrawal of existing Royal Navy aircraft carriers, transfer of Fleet Air Arm fixed-wing jet strike aircraft such as the F-4K (FG.1) Phantom II and Buccaneer S.2 to the Royal Air Force, and cancellation of large replacement aircraft carriers, including the CVA-01 design. The last conventional carrier to be retired was HMS Ark Royal in 1978.

=== Operational maturity of rotary-wing aviation ===
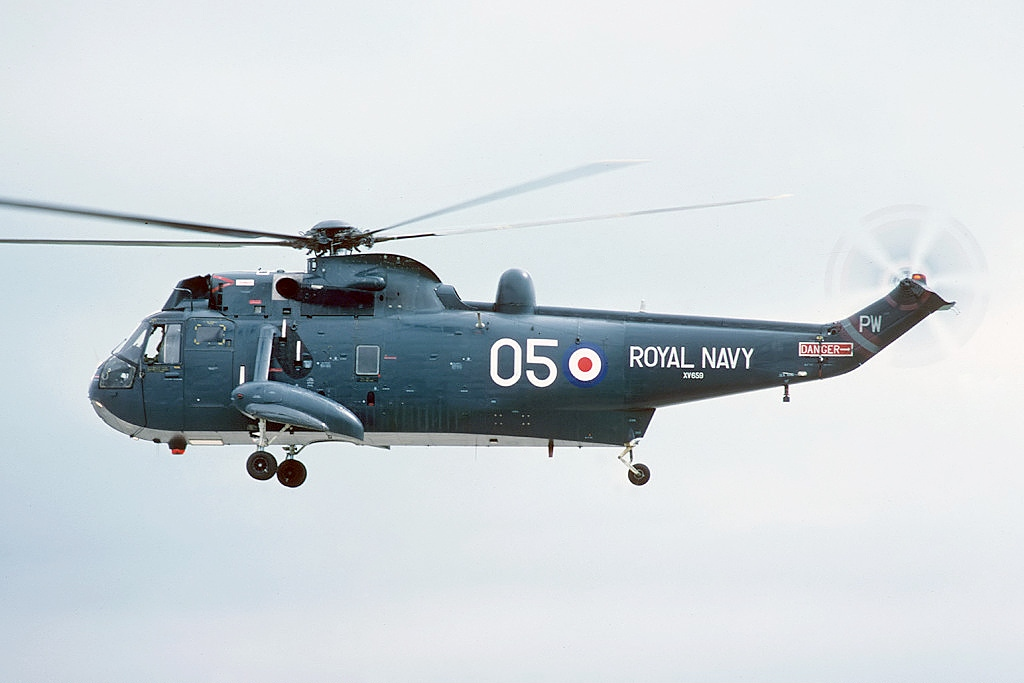
Westland Sea King HAS2A

During the 1970s, rotary-wing aviation became increasingly central to the operational role of the Fleet Air Arm as conventional carrier aviation contracted. The Westland Sea King entered service as the Fleet Air Arm's principal anti-submarine warfare helicopter, providing the fleet with a long-range airborne sensor and weapons platform, while the Westland Wessex continued to provide amphibious, troop transport, search-and-rescue and general-purpose support. The introduction of the Westland Lynx later in the decade added a smaller helicopter capable of operating from frigates and destroyers, extending the fleet's reconnaissance, anti-submarine and anti-surface warfare capabilities to a much wider range of ships. The Aérospatiale Gazelle also entered naval service, principally for helicopter training, while Aérospatiale Gazelles operated with the Royal Marines in reconnaissance and liaison roles.

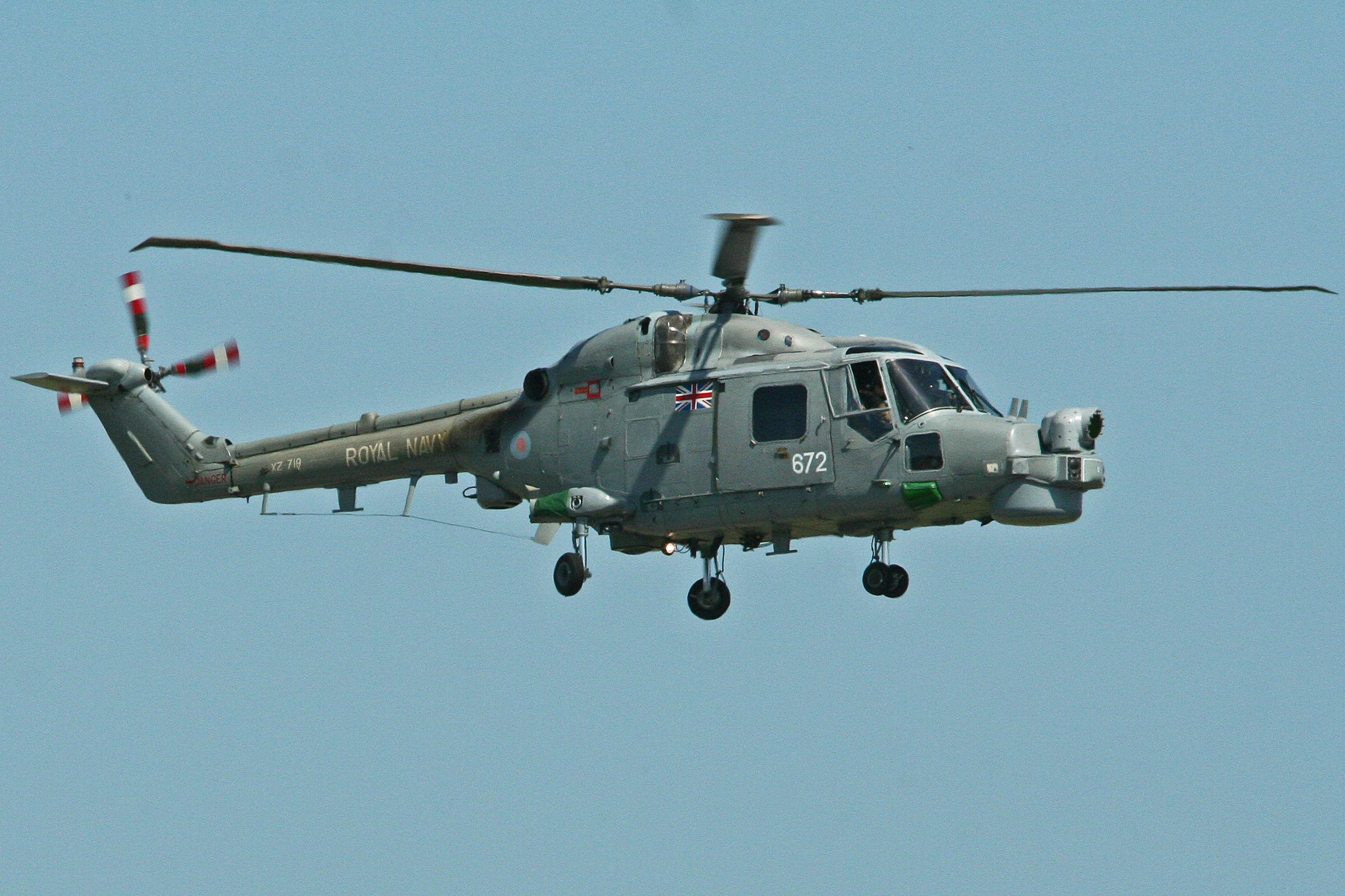
Westland Lynx HMA8

The Falklands War in 1982 demonstrated the breadth and importance of this developing helicopter force. Fleet Air Arm Westland Sea Kings provided anti-submarine warfare and in the commando role, carried troops and supplies, while WestltWessex helicopters undertook troop movement, logistics, casualty evacuation and other support duties. Westland Lynx helicopters operated from the fleet's frigates and destroyers, including in the anti-surface warfare role. The scale of the helicopter contribution was particularly significant: more than 150 helicopters were involved in the campaign, operating intensively in difficult conditions, while Westland Sea Kings maintained a continuous anti-submarine screen around the task force.

The conflict reinforced rather than diminished the importance of naval helicopters. The lessons of the campaign led to additional orders for Westland Sea Kings, Westland Lynx and Aérospatiale Gazelles, while the Westland Sea King itself acquired new roles. The Commando Sea King HC.4, introduced in 1979, increasingly replaced the Westland Wessex as the principal heavy-lift helicopter for Royal Marines operations, while the Westland Sea King was also adapted for airborne early warning following the Falklands conflict, providing the fleet with an organic capability that had been conspicuously lacking during the war. By the 1980s the Westland Sea King consequently combined anti-submarine warfare, amphibious assault, search and rescue and airborne early warning, while the Westland Lynx became an integral part of the surface fleet, combining reconnaissance and anti-submarine duties with anti-surface warfare using Sea Skua air-to-surface missile (ASM).

=== Revival of fixed-wing naval aviation ===
The withdrawal of the Royal Navy's conventional aircraft carriers and the final Fleet Air Arm McDonnell Douglas Phantom operations in 1978 did not end British naval fixed-wing aviation. Instead, the Fleet Air Arm entered a new era based on vertical and/or short take-off and landing (V/STOL) aircraft and smaller carriers. The British Aerospace Sea Harrier FRS.1 entered service in 1979 as a navalised development of the Harrier, equipped with radar and Sidewinder missiles to provide fleet air defence as well as a secondary strike capability.

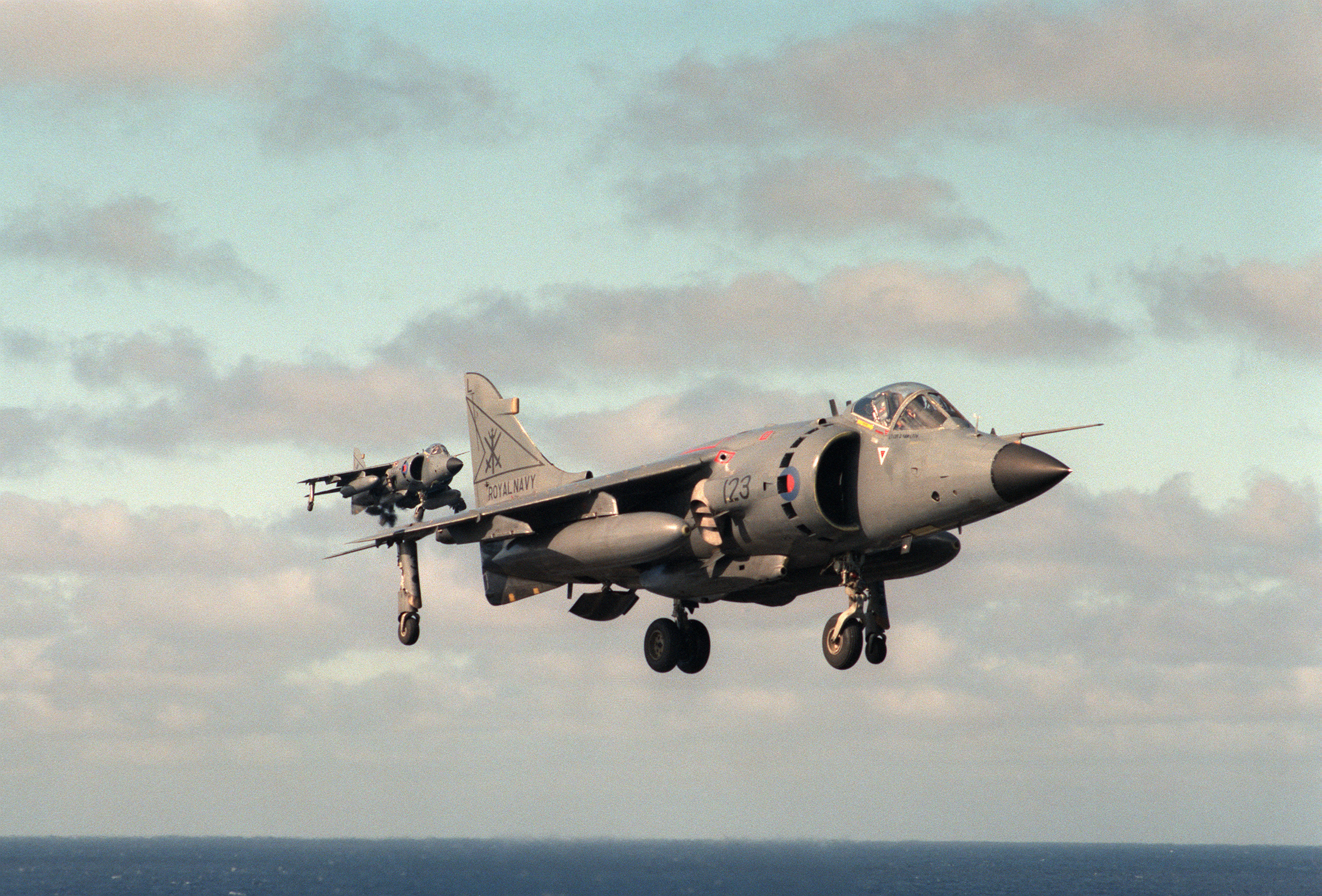
Two Sea Harriers from 800 Squadron approach the U.S. Navy's USS Dwight D. Eisenhower in 1984.

The first operational British Aerospace Sea Harrier squadron, 800 Naval Air Squadron, formed in 1980, followed by 801 Naval Air Squadron in 1981, with the aircraft operating from the new Invincible-class aircraft carriers . The type's ability to operate from a short flight deck assisted by a ski-jump allowed the Royal Navy to retain a fixed-wing carrier air-defence capability without the large carriers, catapults and arresting gear required by the Mc Donnell Douglas Phantom. This capability was tested unexpectedly soon after its introduction when Argentina invaded the Falkland Islands in April 1982. During Operation Corporate, British Aerospace Sea Harriers from a converted HMS Hermes and HMS Invincible formed the principal British carrier-based fighter force, while the Fleet Air Arm rapidly expanded the available force by drawing aircraft and personnel from training and reserve establishments and by re-forming 809 Naval Air Squadron.

The British Aerospace Sea Harriers provided the task force's principal air-defence fighter capability and achieved air superiority over the task force, despite operating at extreme range from Britain and against a larger Argentine air force. Their performance demonstrated that V/STOL carrier aviation could provide effective air cover for a naval task force when conventional large-deck carriers were no longer available.

The Falklands War consequently gave the British Aerospace Sea Harrier a significance extending beyond the conflict itself, validating the Royal Navy's decision to preserve a fixed-wing carrier capability in a radically smaller form. The Royal Navy subsequently developed the Invincible-class as a flexible platform for sustained carrier operations, with British Aerospace Sea Harrier squadrons undertaking NATO exercises and deployments in the Atlantic, Mediterranean, Middle East and Far East. During the Bosnian War, British Aerospace Sea Harriers operated from Royal Navy light aircraft carriers in the Adriatic Sea, conducting reconnaissance, combat air patrol and close air support missions in support of international operations, demonstrating that the aircraft could undertake roles beyond the fleet-defence mission for which it had originally been procured.

At the end of the Cold War in 1989 the Fleet Air Arm was under the command of the Flag Officer Naval Air Command, a rear admiral based at RNAS Yeovilton.

- Flag Officer Naval Air Command (FONAC), at RNAS Yeovilton
  - RNAS Prestwick:
    - 819 Naval Air Squadron, (Anti-submarine, 12× Sea King HAS.5)
    - 826 Naval Air Squadron, (Anti-submarine, 12× Sea King HAS.6)
    - HMS Gannet SAR Flight, (Search & Rescue, 8× Sea King HU.5)
  - RNAS Yeovilton:
    - 707 Naval Air Squadron, (Air Assault, 10× Sea King HC.4)
    - 800 Naval Air Squadron, (12× Sea Harrier FA.2)
    - 801 Naval Air Squadron, (12× Sea Harrier FA.2)
    - 845 Naval Air Squadron, (Air Assault, 10× Sea King HC.4)
    - 846 Naval Air Squadron, (Air Assault, 10× Sea King HC.4)
    - 899 Naval Air Squadron, (Training, 24× Sea Harrier FA.2)
    - Fleet Requirements and Aircraft Direction Unit, (Aggressor Squadron, Canberra TT.18, Hawker Hunter GA.11)
  - RNAS Culdrose:
    - 705 Naval Air Squadron, (Basic Helicopter Training, 38× Gazelle HT.2)
    - 706 Naval Air Squadron, (Sea King Training, 12× various types of Sea King)
    - 750 Naval Air Squadron, (Observer Training, Jetstream T2)
    - 771 Naval Air Squadron, (Search & Rescue, 12× Sea King HU.5)
    - 814 Naval Air Squadron, (Anti-submarine, 12× Sea King HAS.5)
    - 820 Naval Air Squadron, (Anti-submarine, 12× Sea King HAS.6)
    - 824 Naval Air Squadron, (Anti-submarine, 12× Sea King HAS.6) (disbanded August 1989)
    - 849 Naval Air Squadron, (Airborne early warning and control, 10× Sea King AEW.2A, 4× Sea King AEW.5)
  - RNAS Portland:
    - 702 Naval Air Squadron, (Aircrew & Maintenance Training, 24× Lynx HAS.3S)
    - 772 Naval Air Squadron, (Air Assault, 10× Sea King HC.4)
    - 810 Naval Air Squadron, (Anti-submarine, 12× Sea King HAS.6)
    - 815 Naval Air Squadron, (Frigate & Destroyer Helicopters, 32× Lynx HAS.3S, most deployed on frigates and destroyers at sea)
    - 829 Naval Air Squadron, (Frigate & Destroyer Helicopters, 32× Lynx HAS.3S, most deployed on frigates and destroyers at sea)

==== Fleet Air Arm inventory 1989 ====
The inventory of the Fleet Air Arm in 1989 consisted of the following aircraft:

- Combat aircraft:
  - 42× Sea Harrier FRS.1/F(A).2
  - 2×/2× Sea Harrier T.4A/T.4N
- Helicopters:
  - 60+ Sea King HAS.5
  - 31+ Sea King HAS.6
  - 10× Sea King AEW.2A
  - 33× Sea King HC.4
  - 80+ Lynx HAS.3S
  - 23×/8× Gazelle HT.2/HT.3
- Trainers:
  - 3× Canberra TT.18
  - 14× Chipmunk T.10
  - 5× Hunter T.8M
  - 12×/9× Hunter GA.11/T8
  - 19× Jetstream T.2
- Liaison:
  - 16× Dassault Falcon 20 (Civil-registered)

By the 1990s, rotary-wing aviation had become the most numerous and versatile element of the Fleet Air Arm's operational aviation capability. Westland Sea Kings continued to provide anti-submarine warfare, airborne early warning, search and rescue and commando support, while Westland Lynx helicopters operated routinely from frigates and destroyers around the world, providing reconnaissance, anti-submarine and anti-surface warfare capabilities. In April 1997 the Royal Navy's effective helicopter fleet comprised 78 Westland Lynx and 121 Westland Sea Kings, illustrating the scale of the rotary-wing force at the end of the century. Although the British Aerospace Sea Harrier had restored a specialised fixed-wing carrier capability from 1980, helicopters had become indispensable to the Fleet Air Arm's contribution to fleet operations, amphibious warfare and maritime support.

The British Aerospace Sea Harrier FA2, introduced from the early 1990s, further extended the type's capability with improved radar and beyond-visual-range air-to-air missiles, allowing it to remain an effective fleet-defence and multirole aircraft after the end of the Cold War. British Aerospace Sea Harriers subsequently supported operations over the former Yugoslavia and Iraq before the type was progressively withdrawn from Fleet Air Arm service between 2004 and 2006. The British Aerospace Sea Harrier era therefore represented not simply a replacement for the McDonnell Douglas Phantom but a fundamental reconstruction of British naval fixed-wing aviation: the Fleet Air Arm exchanged the speed, range and heavy carrier infrastructure of conventional jet aviation for a smaller, more flexible V/STOL force capable of operating from light carriers and providing air defence and strike support in expeditionary operations.

=== Transition and return of carrier fixed-wing aviation ===
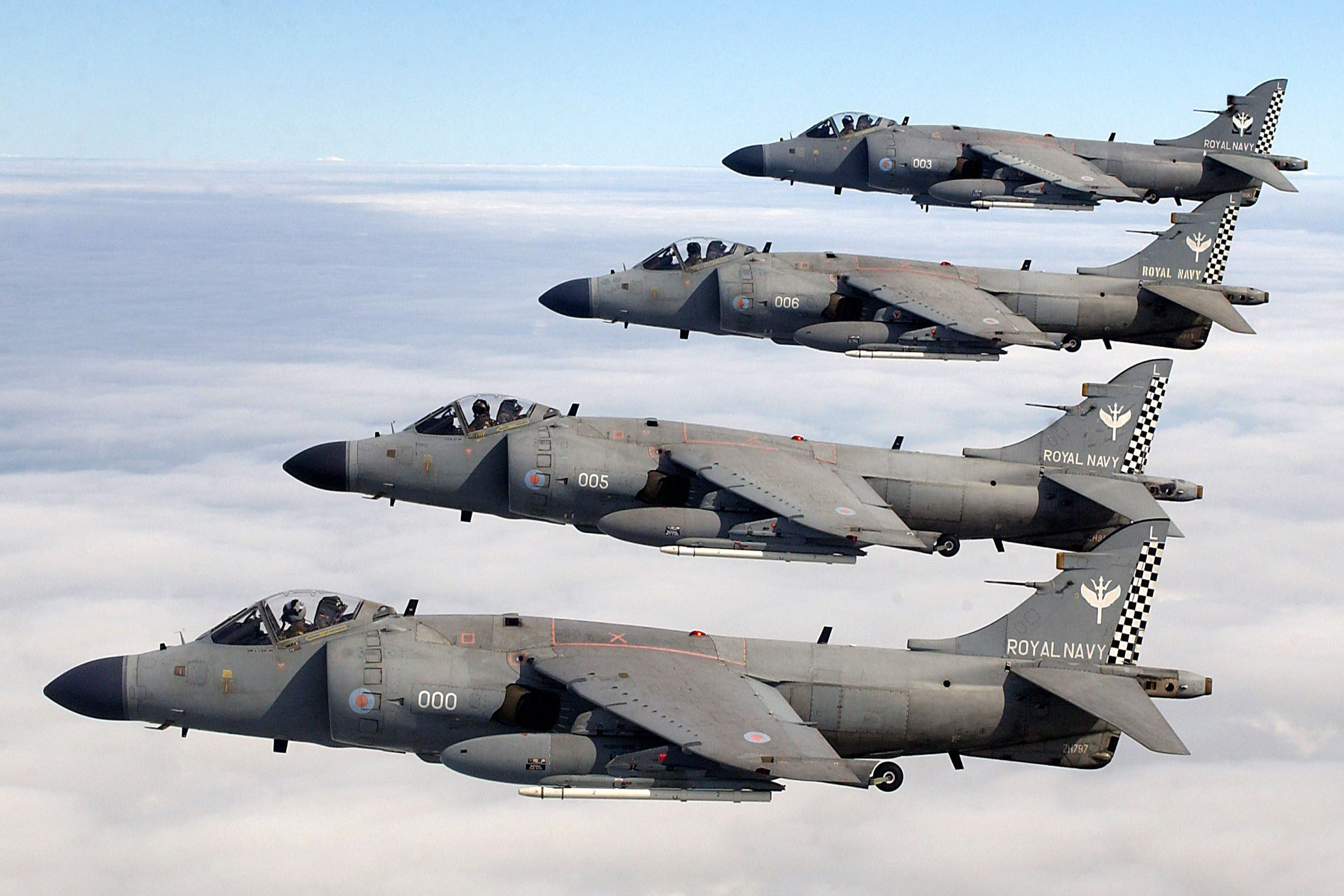
Four Sea Harrier FA.2s from 801 Squadron

At the beginning of the 21st century, the Fleet Air Arm continued to operate the Sea Harrier FA2, which provided the Royal Navy with a dedicated fleet air-defence fighter capability. In April 2000, the Royal Navy and the Royal Air Force Harrier forces were brought together as Joint Force Harrier, with the British Aerospace Sea Harrier FA2 operating alongside the Royal Air Force's Harrier GR7 in a joint force. The British Aerospace Sea Harrier remained the force's principal air-defence aircraft, while the GR7 provided ground-attack and reconnaissance capabilities.

In 2002, the Ministry of Defence announced that Joint Force Harrier would become an all-Harrier GR force, concentrating investment on the GR7 and its planned upgrade to GR9 standard. The British Aerospace Sea Harrier FA2 was to be withdrawn by 2006 because of accelerating obsolescence and the major investment and technical risk that would have been required to maintain its effectiveness. The change shifted the emphasis of Fleet Air Arm fixed-wing aviation from an allocated fleet air defence role towards carrier-based attack operations. The final British Aerospace Sea Harrier aircraft were withdrawn from Royal Navy service by March 2006, ending the Fleet Air Arm's exclusive fixed-wing fleet-air-defence fighter capability.

Harrier GR7

The Fleet Air Arm kept a fixed-wing combat role through its participation in Joint Force Harrier, operating the Harrier GR7 and GR9 alongside RAF personnel. The GR9 provided a better expeditionary strike capability and could employ precision-guided weapons from land or sea. In 2007, elements of the Royal Navy Harrier force were consolidated into the Naval Strike Wing, which operated as part of Joint Force Harrier until the retirement of the Harrier.

The Strategic Defence and Security Review 2010 brought an abrupt end to this phase of Fleet Air Arm fixed-wing aviation. The Harrier was withdrawn from service ahead of the introduction of the F-35B Lightning II and the final Royal Navy and Royal Air Force Harrier flights took place in December 2010. The withdrawal left the Royal Navy without an operational fixed-wing combat aircraft capable of operating from its aircraft carriers, creating a capability gap while the Queen Elizabeth-class aircraft carriers and the F-35B strike aircraft were developed.

The return of carrier fixed-wing aviation was based on the F-35B, the short take-off and vertical-landing variant of the Joint Strike Fighter. The aircraft represented a fundamental change from the Harriers, combining stealth, advanced sensors, networked systems and precision-strike capabilities in a fifth-generation multi-role combat aircraft. Royal Navy personnel were incorporated into the joint Lightning force, the aircraft operating from RAF Marham when not embarked aboard the Queen Elizabeth-class carriers. The procurement plan was for a force of 138 x F-35 Lightning II to be operated by both the RAF and FAA from a common aircraft pool, in the same manner as the Joint Force Harrier.

In 2013, an initial cadre of Royal Air Force and Royal Navy pilots and aircraft maintenance personnel were assigned to the United States Marine Corps Marine Fighter Attack Training Squadron (VMFAT-501) part of the United States Air Force training unit, the 33rd Fighter Wing, at Eglin Air Force Base, Florida, for training on the F-35B Lightning II and 809 Naval Air Squadron was the first FAA squadron to operate the F-35B Lightning II, based at RAF Marham, Norfolk.

The restoration of Royal Navy carrier fixed-wing aviation began with the introduction of the Queen Elizabeth-class carriers. In 2018, HMS Queen Elizabeth sailed to the United States for the first British aircraft carrier trials of the F-35B Lightning II, with the aircraft conducting short take-offs and vertical landings from the carrier.

F-35B Lightning II

In 2021, F-35B Lighting IIs, operating from Queen Elizabeth, conducted the first British combat missions from an aircraft carrier since the retirement of the Harrier, supporting Operation Shader against Islamic State forces in Iraq and Syria. The Fleet Air Arm's role in the Lightning force was strengthened by the re-formation of 809 Squadron in December 2023 as a front-line F-35B Lightning II squadron. It became the second UK front-line F-35B Lightning II unit alongside 617 Squadron, with personnel drawn from the Royal Navy and Royal Air Force.

In July 2024, 809 Squadron generated its first independently conducted F-35B Lighting II sortie, with the aircraft flown, maintained, dispatched and recovered solely by 809 Squadron personnel. In October that year, 809 Squadron embarked on HMS Prince of Wales, marking the return of a Royal Navy fast-jet squadron to a Royal Navy aircraft carrier for the first time in almost 15 years.

By 2025, Fleet Air Arm fixed-wing aviation had developed into a joint fifth-generation carrier capability with the F-35B Lightning II. During Operation Highmast, Prince of Wales deployed with F-35B Lightning IIs from 809 NAS and 617 Squadron, with the deployment intended to demonstrate the ability of the two front-line squadrons to operate together as a carrier strike force and achieve full operating capability for the UK Lightning force. The deployment also demonstrated the integration of Fleet Air Arm fast jets with allied carrier and air forces across the Mediterranean and Indo-Pacific regions.

In 2026, 809 NAS continued to expand its operational role, F-35B Lightning IIs operated from HMS Prince of Wales participated in Exercise Ramstein Flag 26, with Royal Navy aircraft conducting sorties over northern Europe and Finland in support of NATO air operations. The Fleet Air Arm's fixed-wing combat capability had consequently evolved from the British Aerospace Sea Harrier's specialised fleet-air-defence role, through the Harrier's expeditionary strike role and an eight-year carrier fast-jet gap, into a smaller but technologically advanced and highly integrated fifth-generation carrier force.

=== Modernisation and consolidation of naval helicopters ===
Helicopters had become important combat platforms since the Second World War. Initially used in the search and rescue role, they were later developed for anti-submarine warfare and troop transport; during the 1956 Suez Crisis they were used to land Royal Marine Commando forces, the first time this had ever been done in combat.

The Fleet Air Arm entered the 21st century with its rotary-wing capability centred on the Westland Sea King and the Westland Lynx, but the introduction of the AgustaWestland Merlin helicopter brought a significant increase in the capability of its heavyweight maritime helicopters. The Merlin HM1 entered operational service around 2000, progressively assuming the principal anti-submarine warfare role from the Westland Sea King. Its greater range, endurance, payload and sensor capability allowed it to operate as an integral part of the Royal Navy's anti-submarine and maritime forces, while the subsequent Merlin HM2 upgrade introduced a substantially modernised avionics and mission system. From 2014, Merlin HM2 operated from a range of Royal Navy and Royal Fleet Auxiliary vessels, including the Queen Elizabeth-class aircraft carrier, Type 23 frigates and Type 45 destroyers, providing anti-submarine warfare and maritime surveillance capabilities.

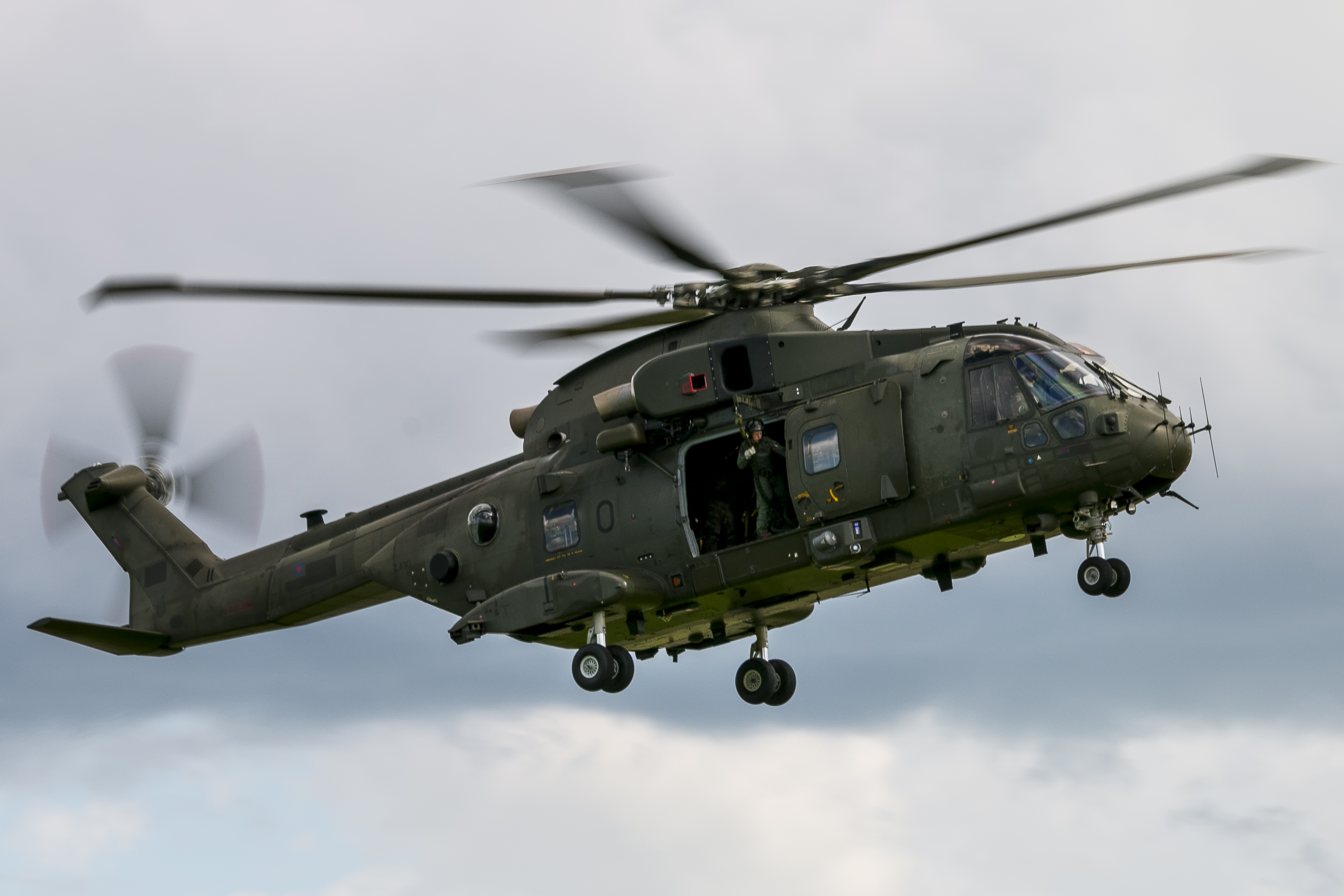
Commando Helicopter Force Merlin HC3/3A

AgustaWestland Merlin also transformed the Fleet Air Arm's support of the Royal Marines. Following the transfer of the Commando Helicopter Force's Merlin Mk3 force to the Royal Navy, 845 and 846 Naval Air Squadrons progressively replaced the Sea King Mk4 with Merlin, bringing the heavyweight helicopter capability of the Fleet Air Arm's maritime and amphibious forces onto a common platform. The introduction of the Merlin Mk4 from 2019 provided an aircraft specifically adapted for amphibious operations, including a folding rotorhead and tail for shipboard use and improved avionics. The type became the principal heavy-lift and troop-carrying helicopter of the Commando Helicopter Force, supporting Royal Marines operations from ships and land bases.

The Fleet Air Arm's lighter shipborne helicopter capability was meanwhile modernised through the replacement of the Westland Lynx by the AgustaWestland Wildcat HMA2. The first AgustaWestland Wildcats were delivered to 815 Naval Air Squadron in 2016, beginning the final transition from the Westland Lynx, which had served with the Royal Navy for more than four decades before its withdrawal in March 2017. Designed principally for operation from frigates, destroyers and Royal Fleet Auxiliary vessels, AgustaWestland Wildcat combined a digital cockpit with modern sensors and weapons systems, providing a more capable platform for anti-surface warfare, reconnaissance, force protection and maritime surveillance while retaining the ability to operate from the small flight decks of the Royal Navy's surface combatants.

The adoption of AgustaWestland Merlin and AgustaWestland Wildcat resulted in a smaller but more technologically sophisticated Fleet Air Arm helicopter force. Merlin became the heavyweight maritime and Commando platform, providing anti-submarine warfare, maritime surveillance, airborne surveillance and control, troop transport and amphibious support, while Wildcat provided the principal helicopter capability embarked on the Royal Navy's frigates and destroyers. The two types also formed the core of the Commando Helicopter Force, with Merlin providing heavy lift and Wildcat providing battlefield reconnaissance and armed support. By the 2020s, this structure had replaced the larger and more varied Sea King and Lynx fleets with a more specialised force designed around networked sensors, modern weapons and the ability to deploy aviation capability across the Royal Navy's surface fleet and amphibious forces.

=== Royal Naval Volunteer Reserve (Air Branch) ===
The Royal Naval Volunteer Reserve (Air Branch) (RNVR(A)) was formed in 1937, with training beginning in 1938, when 33 aircrew were on its books. By October 1945, 8,000 Fleet Air Arm pilots and observers were serving as reservists. In 1952 the RNVR(A) comprised 12 squadrons grouped into five dedicated Air Divisions—Scottish, Northern, Midland, Southern and Channel—each numbering roughly 1,000 personnel and including pilots, observers, air engineering and intelligence officers, fighter direction officers and maintenance personnel. The Air Branch was disbanded in 1957 following the 1956 Defence Review; the Government subsequently explained that the decision reflected financial and manpower considerations despite the branch retaining an operational role. In 1958 the Royal Naval Reserve and Royal Naval Volunteer Reserve were amalgamated, with the title Royal Naval Reserve retained for the unified organisation.

=== Museums ===
The Fleet Air Arm has a museum near RNAS Yeovilton (HMS Heron) in Somerset, England, at which many of the great historical aircraft flown by the Service are on display, along with aircraft from other sources. There is also a Fleet Air Arm museum inside the Museum of Transport & Technology in Auckland, New Zealand. On display there is a full-size replica Fairey Swordfish, along with historic items and memorabilia.

=== Historic flight ===
Until March 2019, the Fleet Air Arm had responsibility for the Royal Navy Historic Flight, a heritage unit of airworthy aircraft representing the history of aviation in the Royal Navy. The Historic Flight was disbanded on 31 March 2019, with responsibility for maintaining and operating the aircraft transferred to Navy Wings, a charitable body that also runs the Fly Navy Heritage Trust.

The Fleet Air Arm has a long tradition of aerobatic and flying display teams, with naval squadrons forming specialist formations for public displays from 1948. These have included fixed-wing teams such as Fred's Five, the Rough Diamonds and Simon's Sircus, and helicopter teams such as the Sharks and the Black Cats, which continues to represent the Royal Navy at air displays. A fuller account is given in the article Royal Navy and Fleet Air Arm aerobatic teams.

== The FAA today ==
The Fleet Air Arm is the aviation branch of the Royal Navy, providing air power for carrier strike, maritime warfare and support to the Royal Marines. Its aircraft operate from Royal Navy aircraft carriers, warships, naval air stations and other air bases, providing capabilities including strike, anti-submarine warfare, maritime surveillance, reconnaissance and amphibious support.

=== Carrier aviation ===
HMS Queen Elizabeth flight deck with F-35B Lightning II

The Fleet Air Arm's fixed-wing combat capability is provided by the F-35B Lightning II , operated as part of the joint Royal Navy–Royal Air Force Lightning Force. 809 Naval Air Squadron was re-formed in December 2023 as the Lightning Force's second front-line F-35B squadron, joining No. 617 Squadron RAF. The two squadrons operate the F-35B from RAF Marham when ashore and are intended to provide an interchangeable pool of Royal Navy and Royal Air Force personnel for carrier operations.

The F-35B provides fifth-generation strike and air-combat capability for the Queen Elizabeth-class aircraft carriers. In 2024, 809 NAS operated F-35Bs from HMS Prince of Wales during carrier training, while in 2025 F-35Bs from 809 NAS and 617 Squadron formed the fast-jet component of the UK Carrier Strike Group's deployment to the Indo-Pacific. In 2026, F-35Bs of 809 NAS operated from HMS Prince of Wales during Exercise Ramstein Flag, alongside the carrier's Merlin and Wildcat helicopters, with sorties extending across northern Europe.

=== Maritime aviation ===
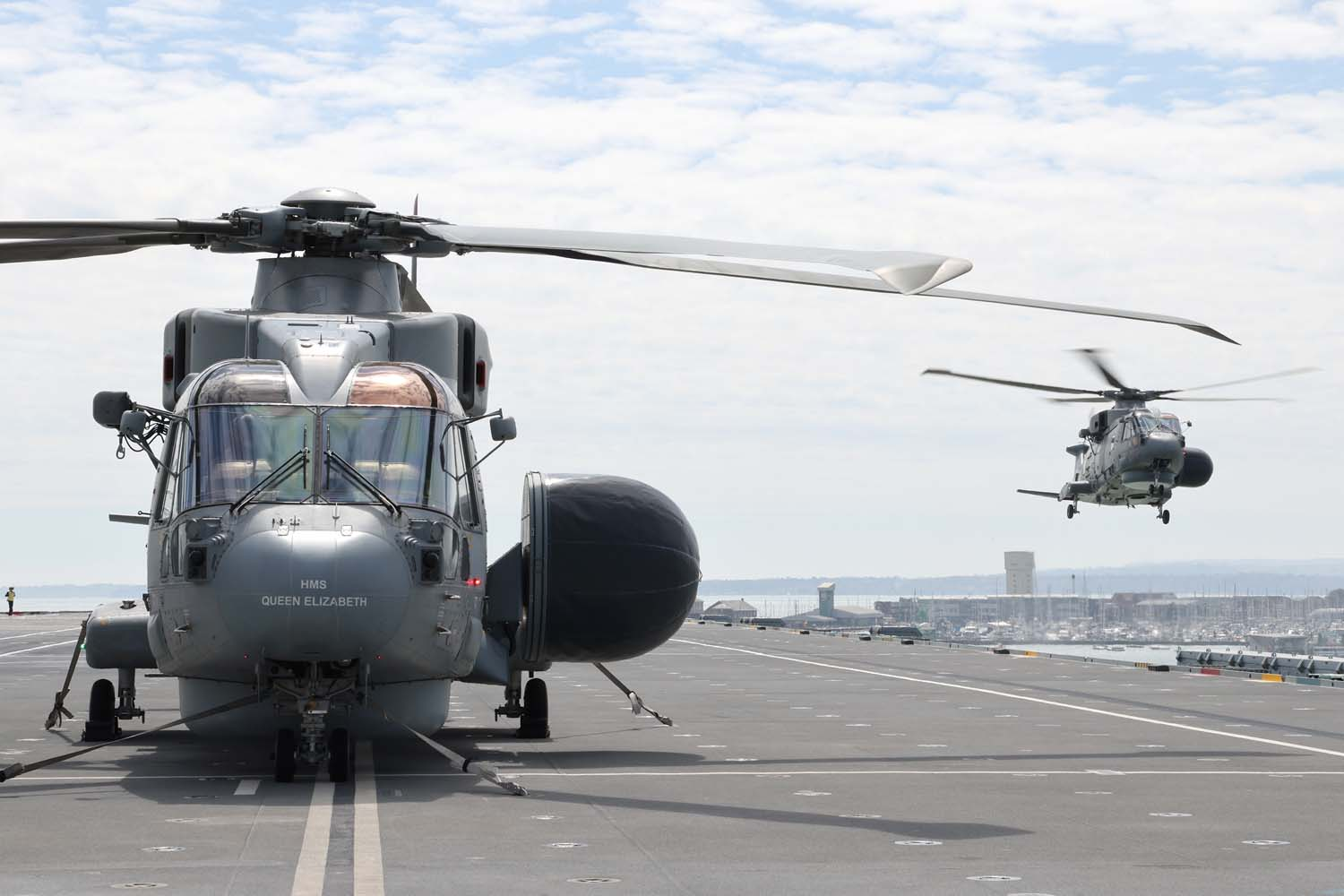
Merlin HMA2, with Crowsnest ASAC, arriving on HMS Queen Elizabeth

The Fleet Air Arm's principal maritime helicopter types are the Merlin HM2 and Wildcat HMA2. Merlin HM2 is operated primarily in the anti-submarine warfare and airborne early warning and control roles. 820 Naval Air Squadron provides the principal Merlin force for the protection of the Queen Elizabeth-class carrier strike groups, with its aircraft using dipping sonar, sonobuoys and torpedoes to detect and attack submarines, while the airborne surveillance and control aircraft use radar to provide an extended air picture for the task group.

Merlin HM2 also provides airborne surveillance and control beyond carrier strike operations. During the UK Carrier Strike Group deployment in 2025, 820 Naval Air Squadron provided Merlin aircraft for both anti-submarine warfare and airborne surveillance and control, with Crowsnest-equipped aircraft providing radar coverage over the task group.

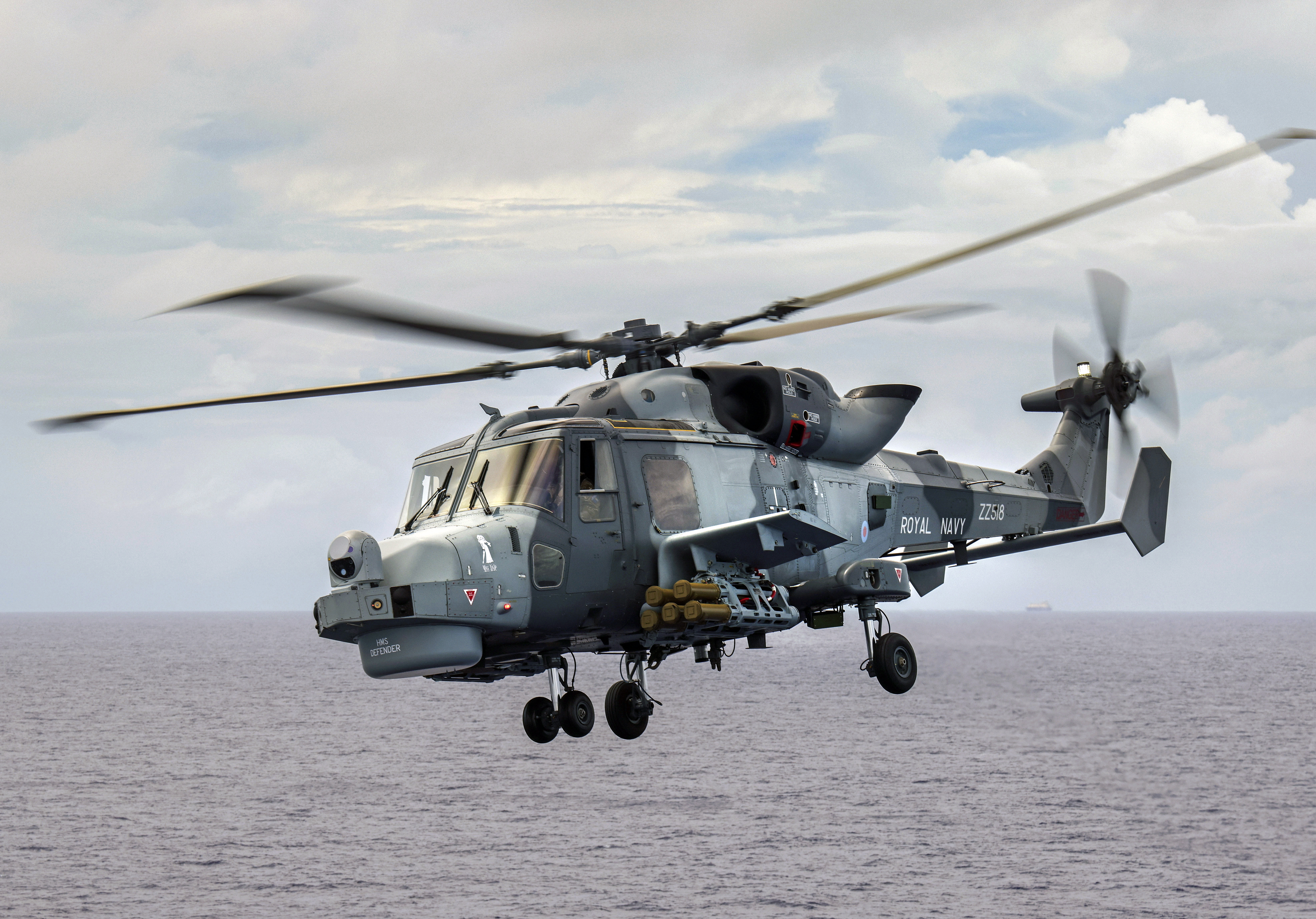
Wildcat HMA2 equipped with Martlet missiles

The Wildcat HMA2 provides the Royal Navy with a shipborne maritime attack and reconnaissance helicopter. 815 Naval Air Squadron operates the type in front-line service, employing the Wildcat for anti-surface warfare, reconnaissance and surveillance, while its weapons include the Martlet and Sea Venom missiles, Sting Ray torpedoes and the M3M heavy machine gun. The aircraft can operate from the relatively small flight decks of Royal Navy frigates and destroyers and is also used for maritime security, search and rescue, logistics and humanitarian assistance. 825 Naval Air Squadron provides Wildcat maritime conversion and training for pilots, observers and engineers before they join the operational force.

The combination of Merlin and Wildcat allows the Fleet Air Arm to provide complementary capabilities within carrier strike groups and individual ship deployments. Merlin provides the principal airborne anti-submarine and surveillance capability, while Wildcat provides a smaller shipborne force optimised for reconnaissance, maritime security and engagement of surface targets.

=== Commando aviation ===
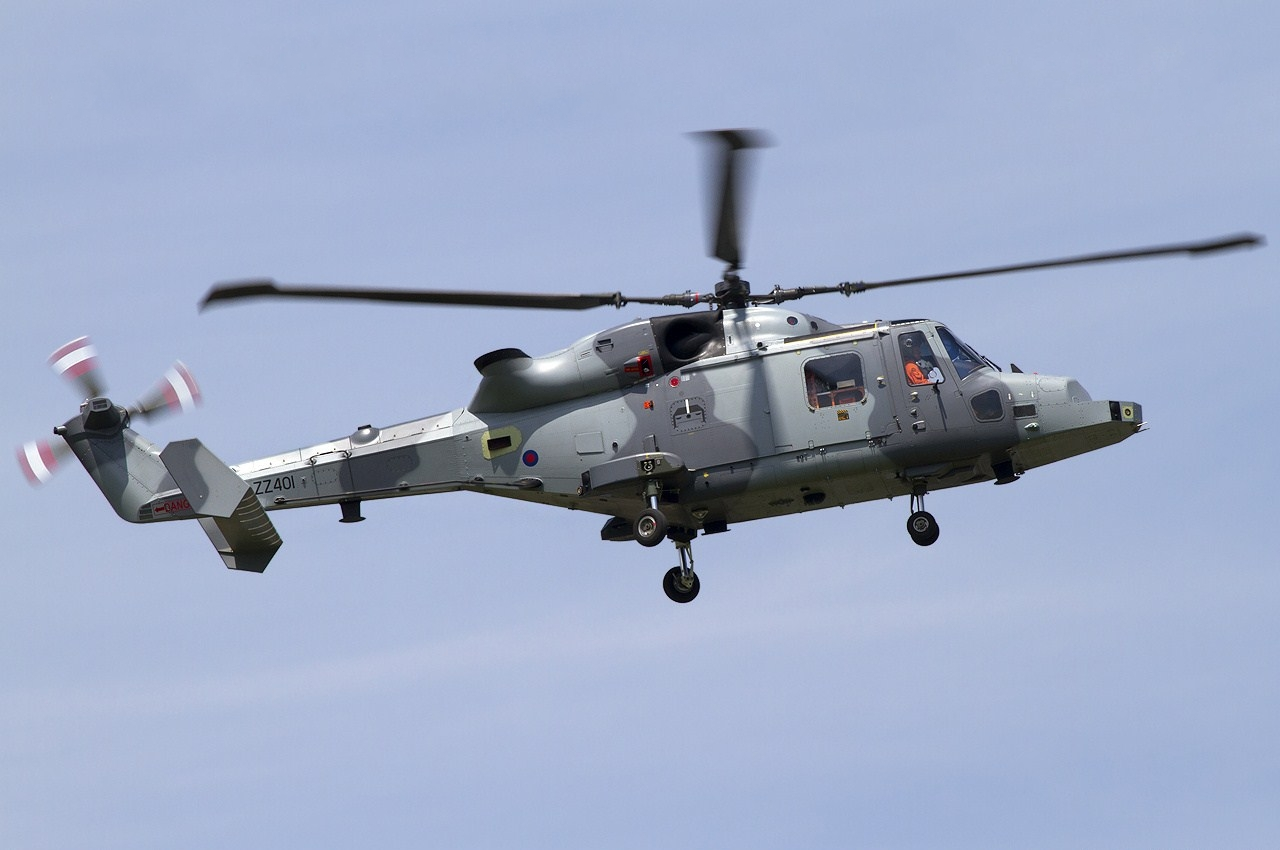
Wildcat AH1 of Commando Helicopter Force

The Commando Helicopter Force provides aviation support to the UK Commando Force and Royal Marines. It comprises 845 and 846 Naval Air Squadrons, which operate the Merlin Mk4 and Mk4A, and 847 Naval Air Squadron, which operates the Wildcat AH1.

The Merlin Mk4 is used for tactical mobility and amphibious operations, including the movement of Royal Marines and equipment between ships and shore. 845 Naval Air Squadron provides tactical mobility, including ship-to-shore strike, air assault and the tactical insertion and extraction of personnel and equipment, while also undertaking roles including personnel recovery, search and rescue, evacuation and maritime intra-theatre lift. 846 Naval Air Squadron is the second frontline Merlin Mk4 squadron and also operates the Operational Conversion Flight responsible for training pilots, aircrew and engineers for the type.

847 Naval Air Squadron operates the Wildcat AH1 in the armed reconnaissance and light transport roles in support of the Royal Marines. Its capabilities include intelligence, surveillance, target acquisition and reconnaissance, fire control, offensive action, casualty evacuation and combat recovery. The aircraft can operate either embarked or from land bases and is designed to support the Commando Force in a range of environments.

=== Uncrewed and autonomous aviation ===
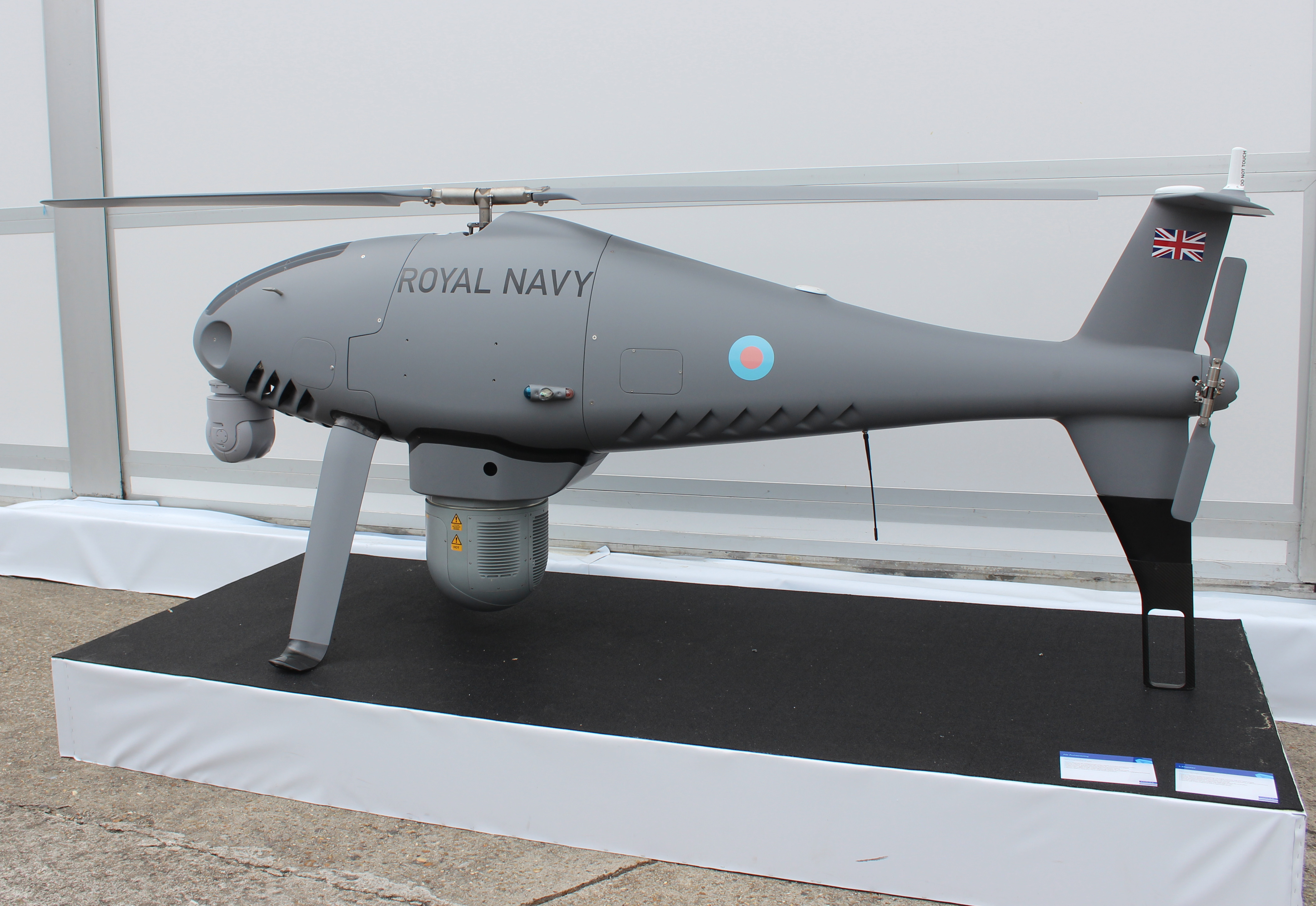
Peregrine; remotely piloted helicopter for surveillance, tracking and target identification

The Fleet Air Arm is increasingly incorporating remotely piloted and autonomous aircraft into naval aviation. 700X Naval Air Squadron is the Royal Navy's specialist unit for remotely piloted air systems (RPAS) and operates deployable flights using the Puma RPAS for surveillance. The squadron also operates the Malloy T-150 uncrewed aircraft system for transporting supplies and the Peregrine remotely piloted helicopter for surveillance, tracking and target identification. It is responsible for training and experimentation in RPAS and supports the Royal Navy's development of a "hybrid navy" in which uncrewed systems operate alongside crewed aircraft.

In September 2025, the Royal Navy declared the Malloy T-150 and Peregrine ready for front-line operations. The T-150 was intended to transport supplies to Royal Marines in demanding environments, while Peregrine was introduced to provide intelligence, surveillance and reconnaissance from Royal Navy warships.

The Royal Navy is also developing the integration of uncrewed systems with conventional Fleet Air Arm aircraft. In 2025, a Merlin HM2 operated with a Puma remotely piloted aircraft during trials intended to demonstrate the use of crewed aircraft and drones together, while subsequent trials in 2026 demonstrated a Wildcat operating with multiple uncrewed systems and sensors.

=== Future development ===
The Fleet Air Arm's future development is increasingly centred on the integration of crewed and uncrewed aircraft. The 2025 Strategic Defence Review called for the Royal Navy's carrier air wings to evolve into a "hybrid" force combining crewed combat aircraft, autonomous collaborative platforms and single-use drones. It also identified greater use of uncrewed systems as part of the future development of maritime surveillance and anti-submarine warfare capabilities.

The resulting force is therefore increasingly based on the combination of crewed aircraft and networked uncrewed systems. F-35B provides the principal fixed-wing carrier strike capability, Merlin provides anti-submarine warfare and airborne surveillance and control, Wildcat provides shipborne maritime attack and reconnaissance, and the Commando Helicopter Force provides aviation support to the Royal Marines. Uncrewed systems are being introduced to extend surveillance, provide logistical support and complement crewed aircraft, forming part of the Fleet Air Arm's evolving approach to naval aviation.

== Aircraft ==
The Fleet Air Arm operates fixed-wing, rotary-wing and uncrewed aircraft in support of Royal Navy and Royal Marines operations. Its aircraft provide carrier strike, air defence, anti-submarine warfare, maritime surveillance and reconnaissance, surface warfare, amphibious assault, tactical mobility and logistical support. Aircraft are operated from Royal Navy aircraft carriers, warships, shore bases and austere locations, with training conducted through the United Kingdom’s integrated military flying training system. It uses the same aircraft designation system as the RAF.

=== Fixed-wing aircraft ===
==== F-35B Lightning II ====
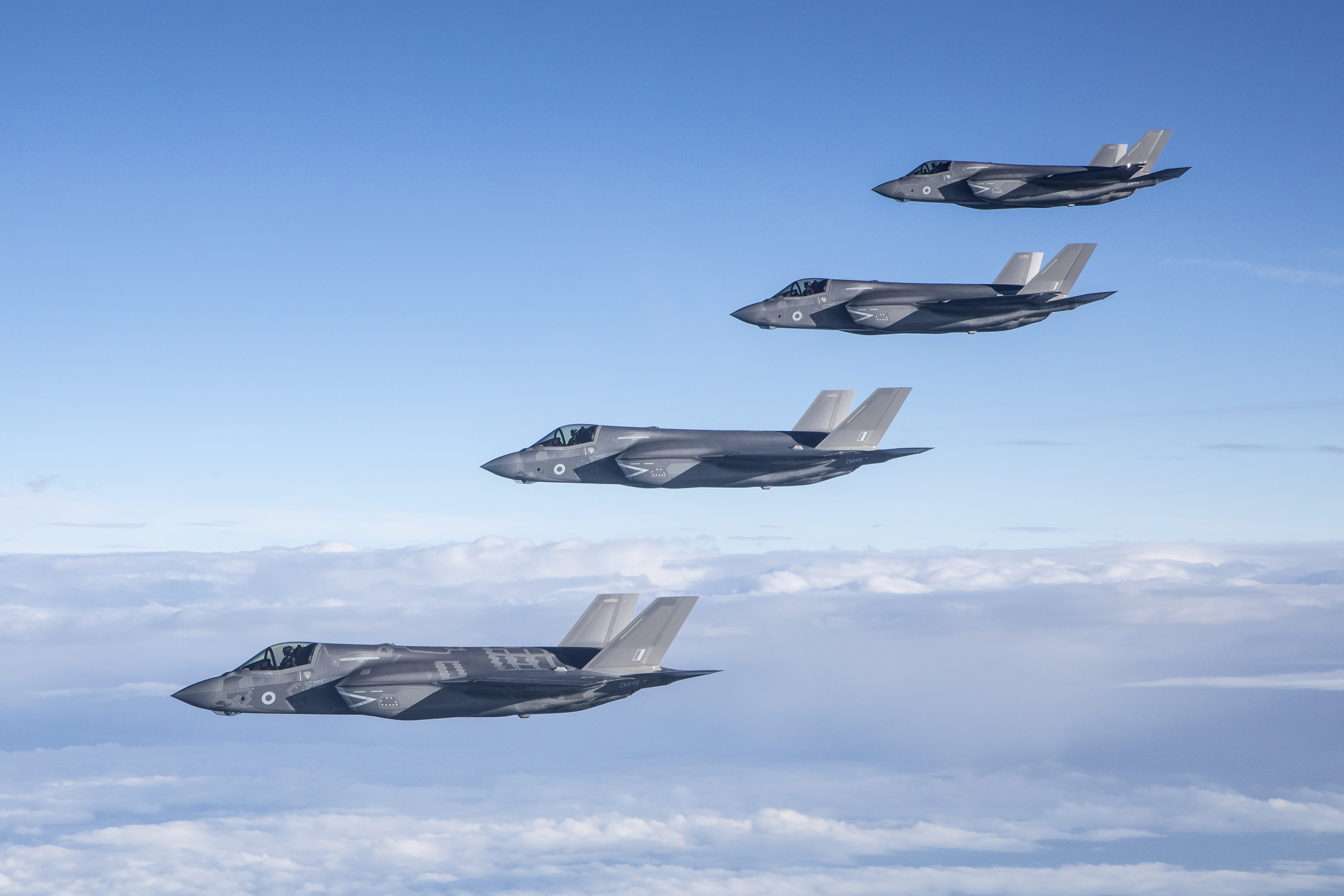
The Fleet Air Arm operates the F-35B from the Queen Elizabeth-class aircraft carriers.

The F-35B Lightning II is the Fleet Air Arm's principal fixed-wing combat aircraft. The short take-off and vertical landing variant operates from the Royal Navy's Queen Elizabeth-class aircraft carrier and provides fifth-generation air-combat, air-defence and strike capabilities. Its stealth, sensors and networked systems allow it to conduct air-to-air and air-to-ground missions while also contributing to intelligence, surveillance and reconnaissance.

In January 2019, initial operating capability for the UK's F-35B Lightning II was announced with 18 F-35B Lightning IIs jointly delivered to the UK. As of December 2022, 26 aircraft were operational in the UK and based at RAF Marham. These aircraft regularly deployed for operations on the Queen Elizabeth-class aircraft carriers.

Fleet Air Arm F-35B Lightning IIs are operated as part of the joint Royal Navy–Royal Air Force Lightning Force. 809 Naval Air Squadron was re-formed at RAF Marham in December 2023 as a frontline F-35B Lightning II squadron, alongside the RAF's 617 Squadron. The two squadrons comprise personnel from both services and operate the aircraft from land bases and the Queen Elizabeth-class carriers.

The F-35B Lightning II provides the principal fixed-wing component of the UK's carrier strike capability. In 2026, F-35B Lightning IIs of 809 Naval Air Squadron operated from HMS Prince of Wales during NATO's Ramstein Flag exercise and subsequent Carrier Strike Group operations, including air-defence and long-range strike missions.

While 47 F-35B aircraft (including 3 or 4 based in the U.S.) were in the U.K. inventory by March 2026, as the former U.K. Defence Secretary Ben Wallace had reported, the RAF and Royal Navy faced a considerable challenge in providing even the existing modest F-35B fleet with qualified pilots. As of late 2022 there were only 30 qualified British pilots (plus three exchange pilots from the United States and Australia) for the F-35. The average wait time for RAF trainee Typhoon and F-35 pilots, after completing the Military Flying Training System, was approximately 11 and 12 months respectively. A further gap of 68 weeks existed between completing Basic Flying Training and beginning Advanced Fast Jet Training. The resulting pilot shortage was a factor in delaying the ability to stand up the first Fleet Air Arm Squadron (809 Squadron) on a timely basis. In February 2023, the Chief of the Air Staff, Air Chief Marshal Sir Mike Wigston, reported that the number of F-35 pilots had grown to 34 UK pilots with a further 7 to complete training by August 2023. However, in 2025 the National Audit Office (NAO) reported that a consistent shortage of pilots remained, along with other shortages including of F-35 engineers. Pilot-to-aircraft ratios were reported at about 1:1, which were argued by some to be "far below the 1.3 to 1.5 considered healthy in most air forces".

=== Rotary-wing aircraft ===
Today the largest section of the FAA is the rotary wing section. Pilots designated for rotary wing service train under No. 1 Flying Training School at RAF Shawbury. The school is a tri-Service organisation consisting of civilian and military instructors (including Naval instructors and a Naval Air Squadron) that take the student from basic flying through to more advanced flying such as instrument flying, navigation, formation and captaincy.

Within the school 705 Naval Air Squadron provides helicopter flight training. The curriculum encompasses non-procedural instrument flying, fundamental night flying, low-level and formation flying, winching, and mountain flying. Since April 2018, 705 NAS has been training pilots and aircrew from all three branches of the military under the 2 Maritime Air Wing.

Its aviators fly one of four types of helicopters:

==== Merlin HM2 ====
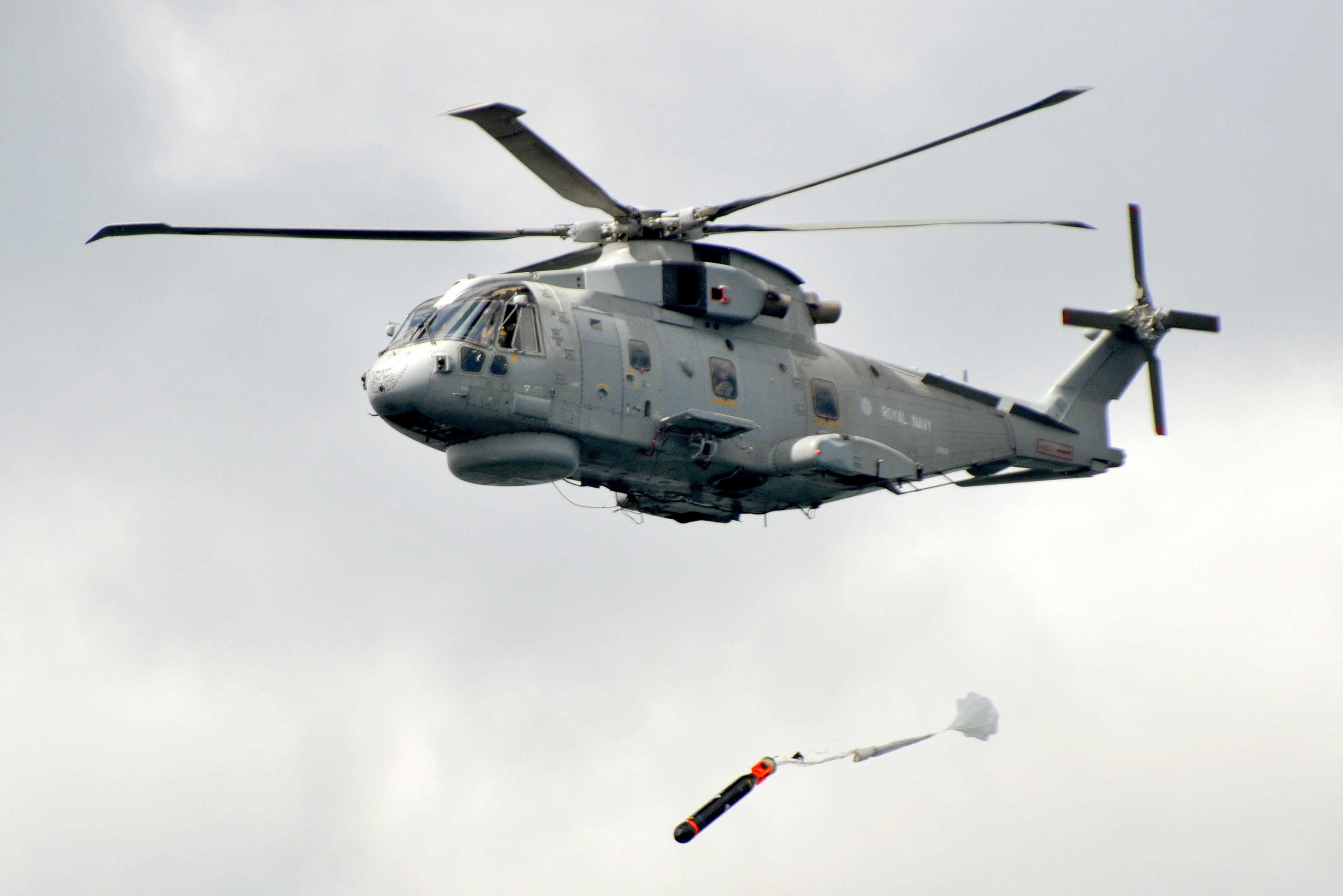
A Merlin HM2 aircraft of 824 NAS.

The AgustaWestland Merlin HM2 is the Fleet Air Arm's principal anti-submarine warfare (ASW) helicopter. Operated by the Merlin Helicopter Force from Royal Naval Air Station Culdrose, it uses sonobuoys, dipping sonar and other sensors to locate and track submarines and can employ Sting Ray torpedoes against underwater targets. Merlin HM2 also provides maritime surveillance and Airborne early warning and control, including the Crowsnest system used to provide the Carrier Strike Group with an extended radar picture beyond the horizon.

Merlin with Crowsnest replaced the ASaC7 variant of the Sea King with the first Merlin HM2 test flight equipped with Crowsnest was completed in April 2019. While Crowsnest was deployed with the UK Carrier Strike Group in 2021, it experienced operating challenges, finally achieving initial operating capability in July 2023 and full operating capability in 2025.

While all Merlins in the Royal Navy will be equipped to operate Crowsnest, only ten kits for the system are being acquired. It has been reported that initially five Merlins will be equipped with Crowsnest, three of these being normally assigned to the "high readiness" aircraft carrier.

In 2025, nine Merlin HM2s from 820 Squadron were specifically assigned to embark on HMS Prince of Wales as part of the Royal Navy's carrier strike group deployment to the Indo-Pacific region. Six of the Merlins deployed in the ASW role and three in the AEW role.

The Merlin HM2 forms an important part of the air group embarked aboard the Queen Elizabeth-class aircraft carrier, where its anti-submarine and airborne surveillance roles complement the F-35B. Merlin helicopters also operate from other Royal Navy ships and undertake maritime security, search and rescue and other supporting tasks as required.

==== Merlin HC4/4A ====
A Merlin HC4 of Commando Helicopter Force

The Merlin HC4 and HC4A are the Fleet Air Arm's Commando transport helicopters and are operated by the Commando Helicopter Force in support of the Royal Marines and United Kingdom Commando Force. The aircraft provide tactical mobility between ships and shore, air assault, littoral ship-to-shore movement and the insertion and extraction of personnel and equipment. They can also undertake joint personnel recovery, deployed search and rescue, non-combatant evacuation, counter-narcotics and maritime intra-theatre lift missions.

845 and 846 Naval Air Squadrons operate the Merlin Mk4 as frontline elements of the Commando Helicopter Force, with the aircraft designed to support amphibious operations and the Royal Marines' developing littoral warfare capability. 846 NAS also houses the Operational Conversion Flight responsible for training pilots, aircrewmen and engineers to operate the Merlin Mk4.

The FAA received the Merlin HC3/HC3A fleet from the RAF, replacing the Commando Sea King in September 2014. These have been marinised and updated to HC4s/HC4As, under the Merlin Life Sustainment Programme (MLSP) that was placed on contract in December 2013.

==== Wildcat HMA2 ====
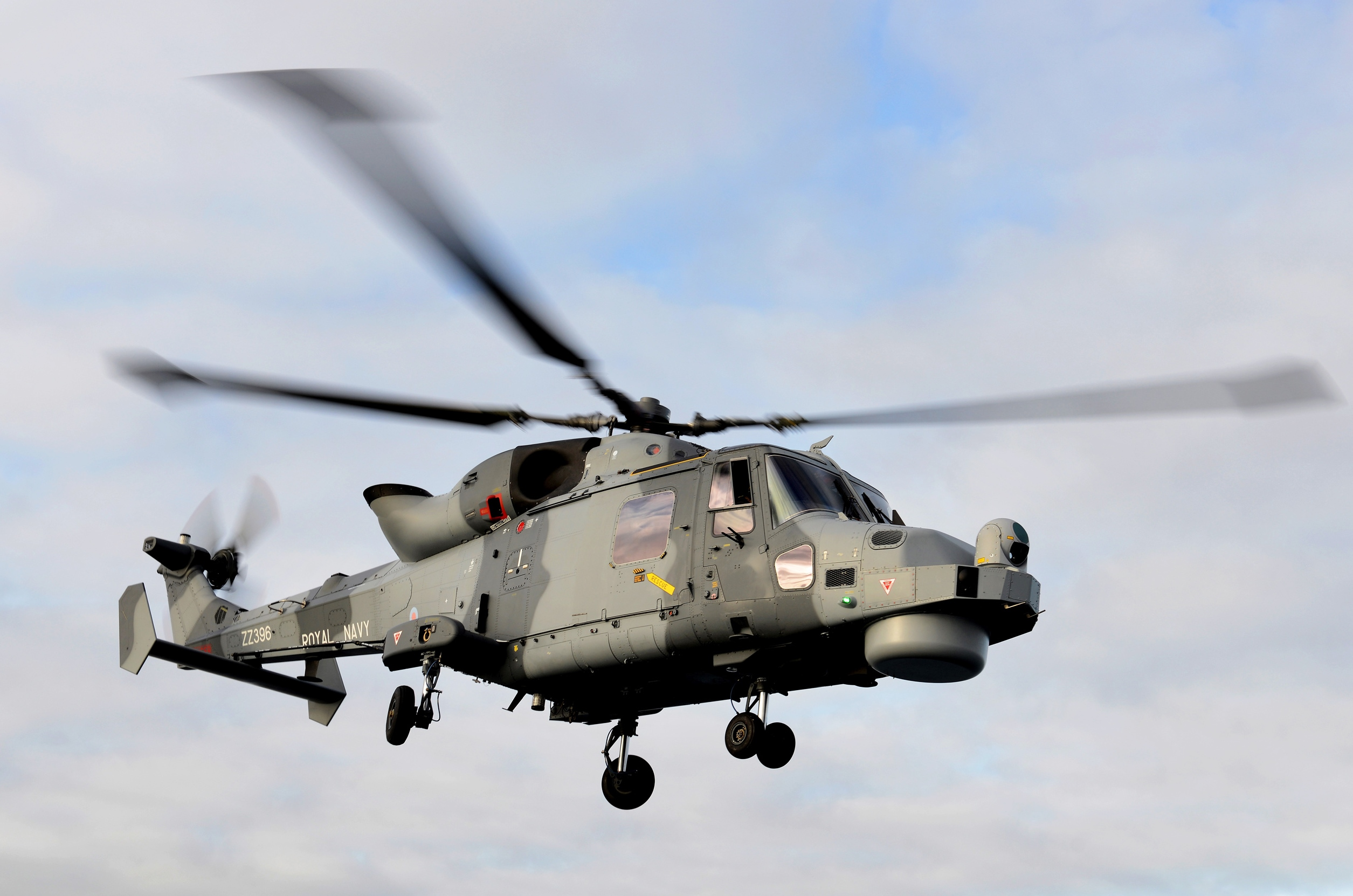
A Wildcat HMA2 of 700(W) NAS conducting trials off HMS Monmouth.

The Wildcat HMA2 is the Fleet Air Arm's principal maritime attack and reconnaissance helicopter. Operated by 815 Naval Air Squadron and its shipborne flights, it is designed to operate from the relatively small flight decks of Royal Navy frigates and destroyers and extends the surveillance and targeting capabilities of the ships from which it operates.

The Wildcat HMA2 can conduct anti-surface warfare (ASuW) and maritime security operations using weapons including the Martlet and Sea Venom missiles and M3M heavy machine gun, while its sensors support reconnaissance and surveillance. It can also employ the Sting Ray torpedo and undertake secondary roles including search and rescue, load lifting, troop movement and humanitarian assistance and disaster relief.

==== Wildcat AH1 ====
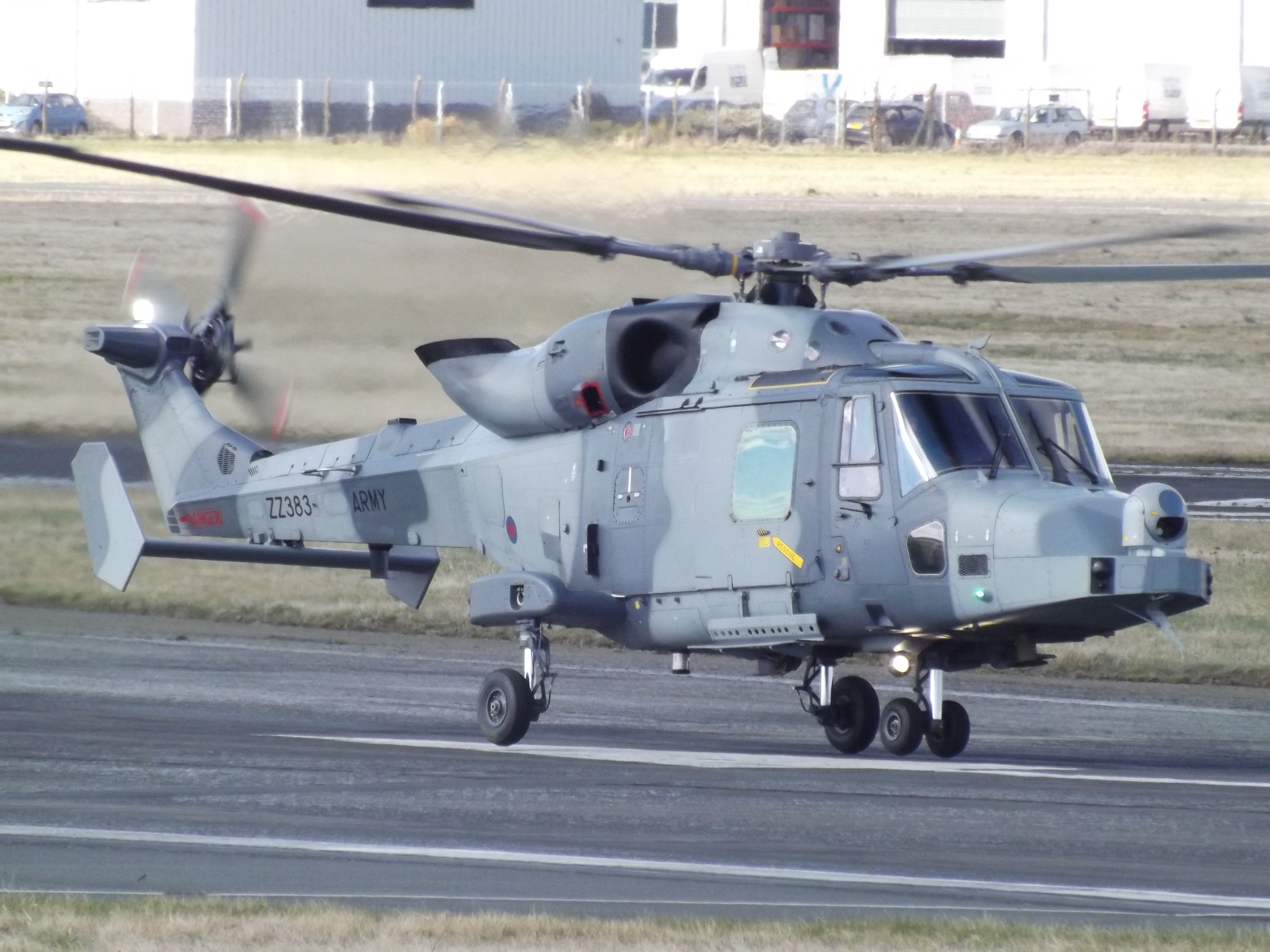
The Wildcat AH1 Battlefield Reconnaissance Helicopter (BRH) used by 847 NAS.

The Wildcat AH1 is the battlefield reconnaissance and utility variant operated by the Commando Helicopter Force. 847 Naval Air Squadron employs the type in support of Royal Marines and wider UK Commando Force operations, providing battlefield reconnaissance, intelligence, surveillance and target acquisition, fire-control support, troop movement and other battlefield tasks. The aircraft can also undertake winching, casualty evacuation and disaster-relief missions.

Under the 2026 defence investment plan (DIP), these helicopters are projected to be retired from 2027 with no confirmed timeline for their replacement by autonomous systems.

=== Training aircraft ===
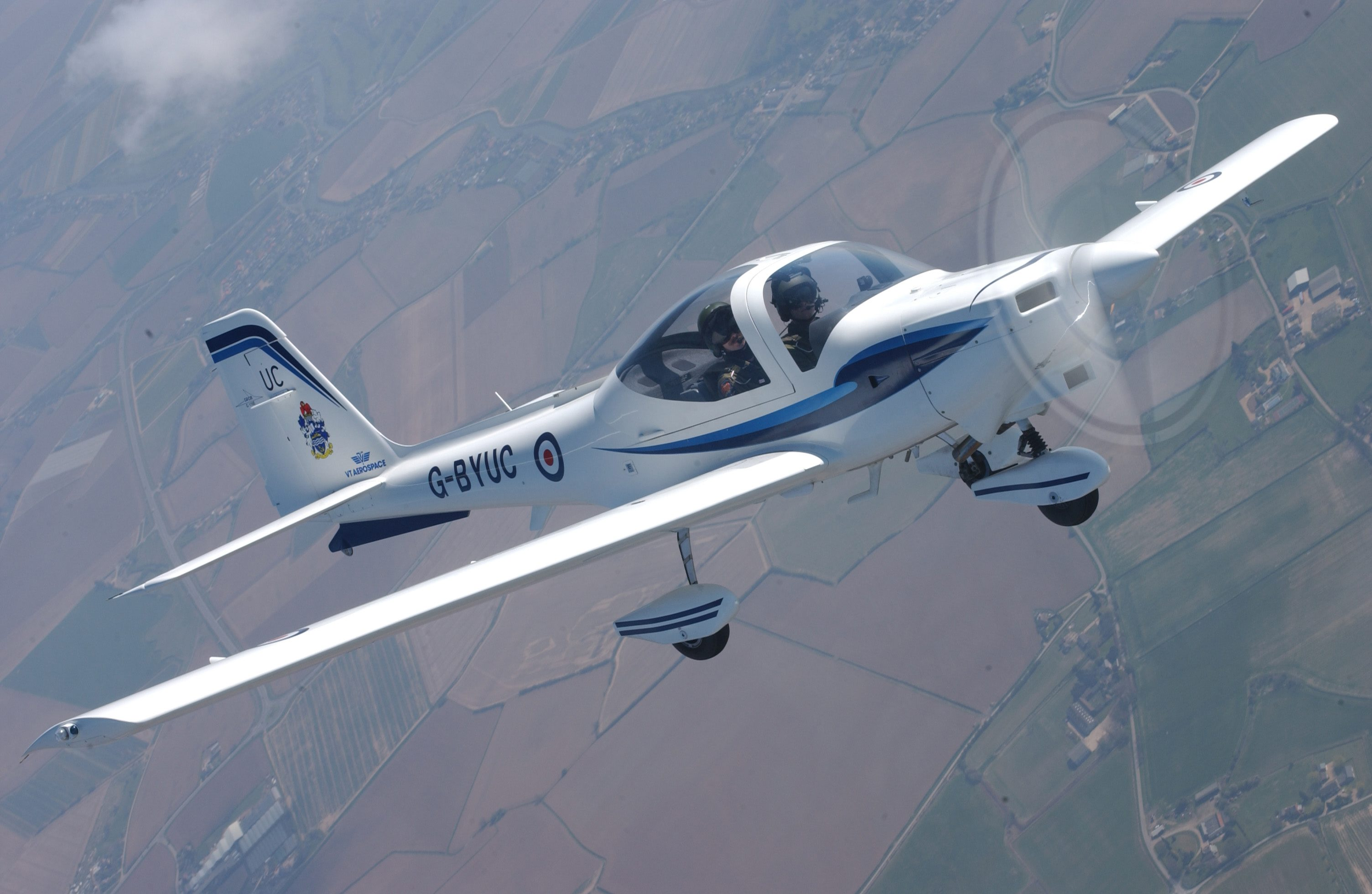
Grob Tutor T1

Fleet Air Arm aircrew undergo training through the United Kingdom's integrated military flying training system, with Royal Navy personnel training alongside personnel from the other armed services. Initial pilot assessment is conducted by 727 Naval Air Squadron at Royal Naval Air Station Yeovilton, where students undergo pilot grading and assessment using the Grob 115E Tutor T1. The squadron assesses students' suitability for further flying training and their potential for different aviation streams, including fast jets and helicopters.

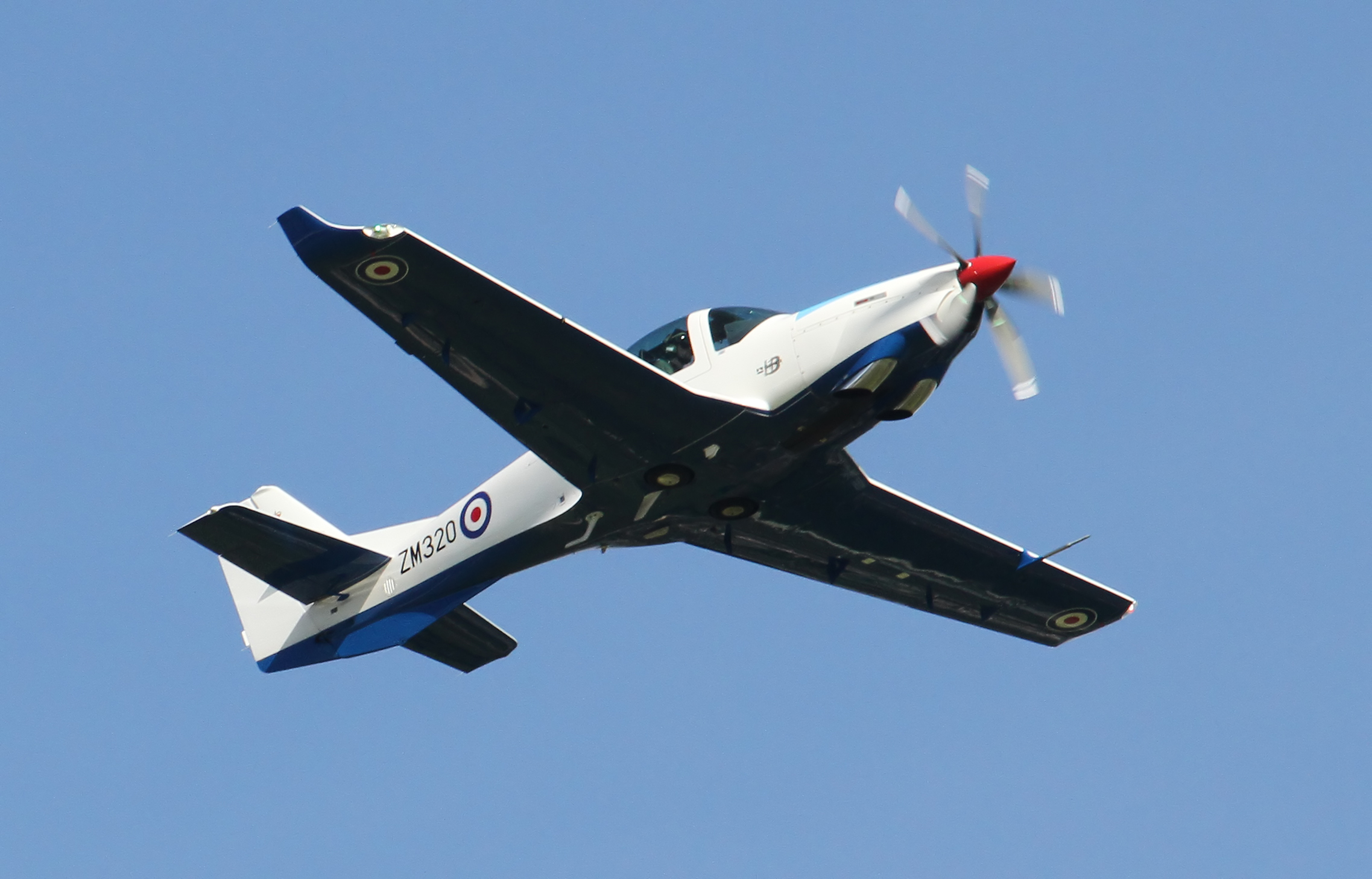
Grob Prefect T1

Elementary flying training is provided through No. 3 Flying Training School, including 703 Naval Air Squadron, using the Grob Prefect T1. The course develops basic flying skills, navigation, instrument flying and emergency handling before students progress to specialist military flying training.

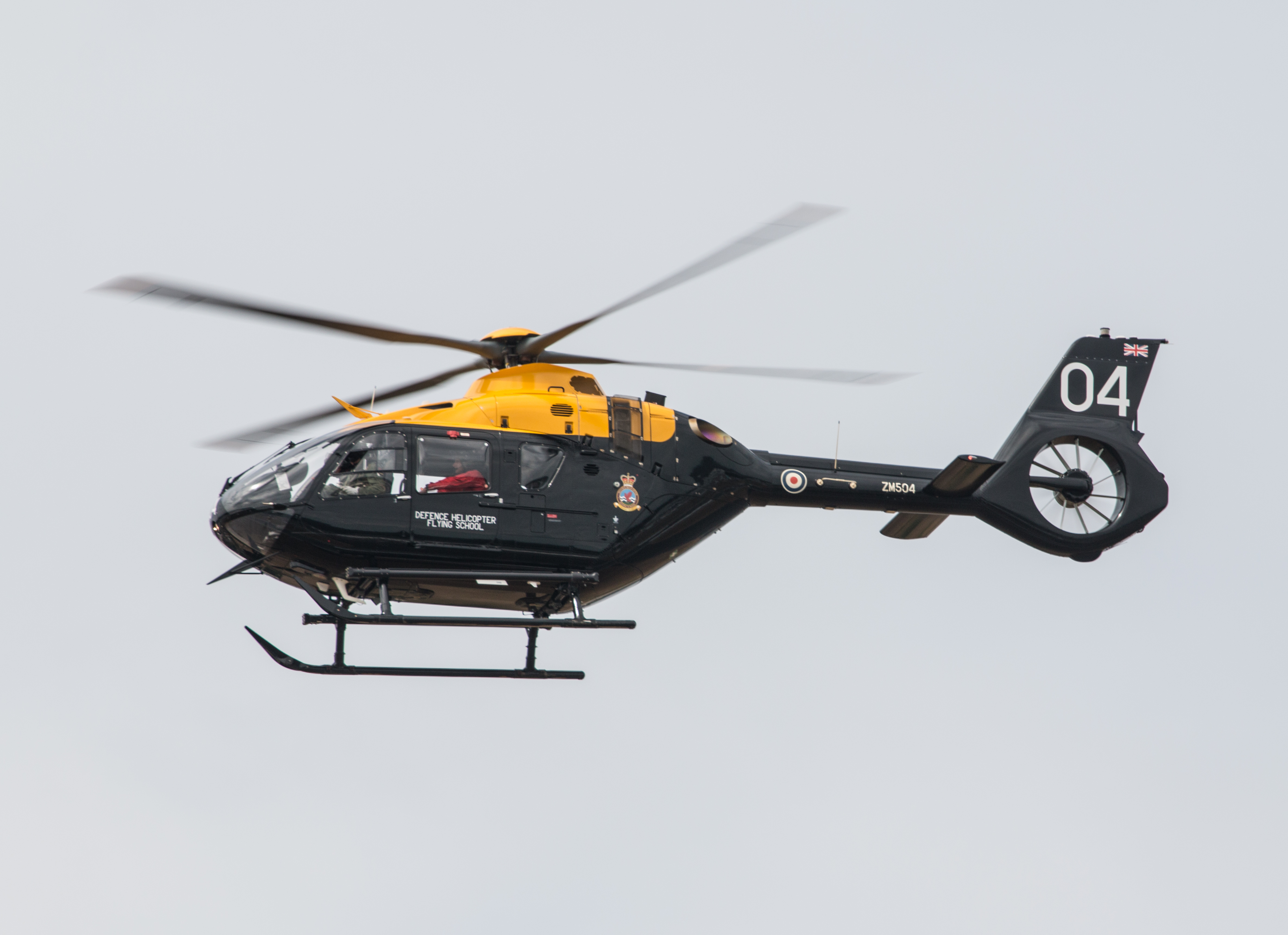
Airbus Juno HT1

Royal Navy helicopter pilots subsequently undergo basic rotary-wing training with 705 Naval Air Squadron at RAF Shawbury, part of No. 1 Flying Training School, flying the Airbus Juno HT1. The training includes instrument, night, low-level and formation flying, as well as winching and mountain flying, before Fleet Air Arm students progress to type-specific training.

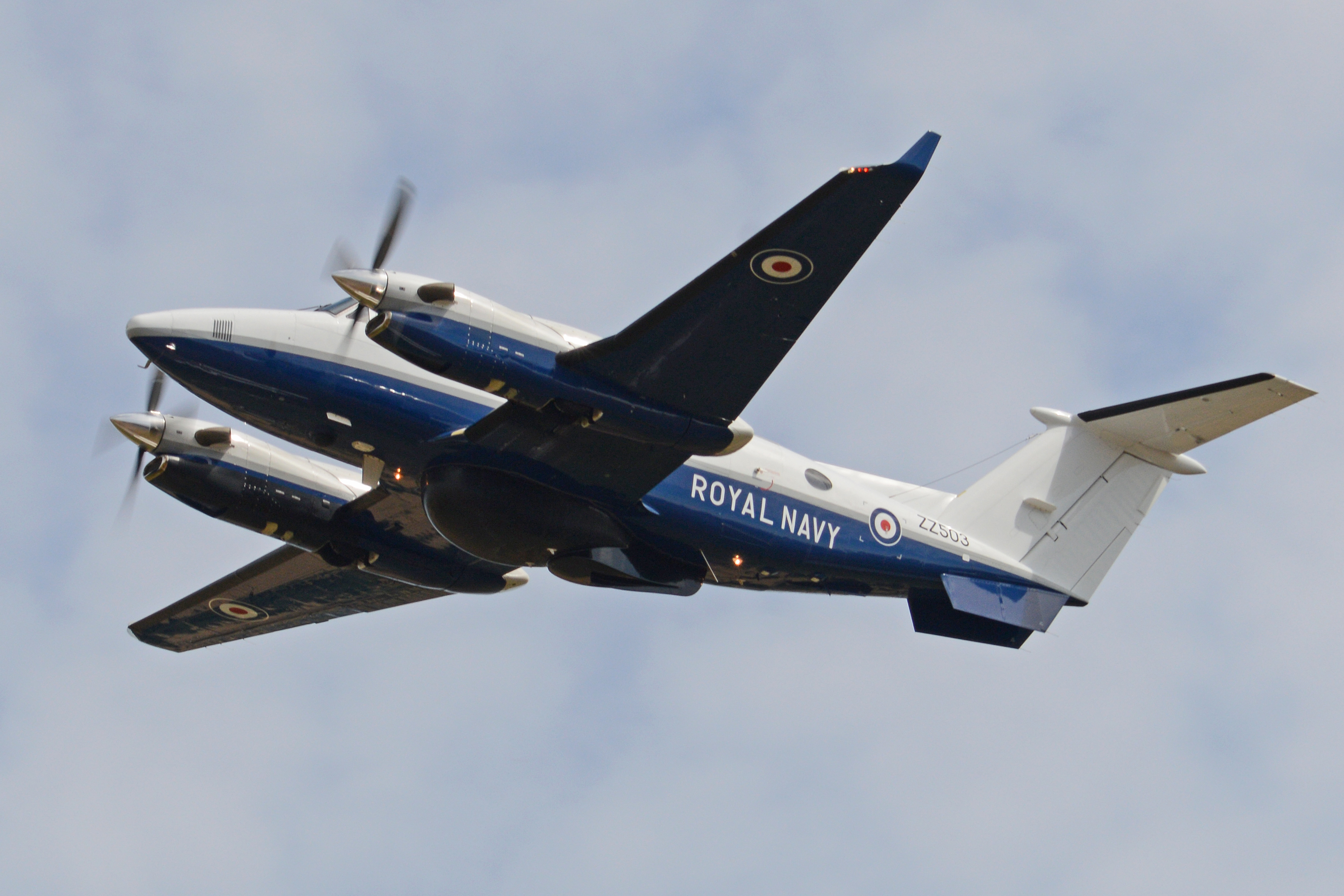
Beechcraft Avenger T1

Specialist training for Royal Navy observers is provided by 750 Naval Air Squadron at Royal Naval Air Station Culdrose using Beechcraft Avenger T1 aircraft as airborne training platforms. The squadron trains observers in navigation, sensor operation, maritime operations and the management of airborne missions before they specialise on operational aircraft such as Merlin and Wildcat.

Type-specific operational conversion is subsequently conducted by specialist Fleet Air Arm squadrons, including 824 Naval Air Squadron for Merlin HM2, 825 Naval Air Squadron for Wildcat HMA2 and 846 Naval Air Squadron's Operational Conversion Flight for Merlin HC4/HC4A.

=== Uncrewed aircraft ===
The Fleet Air Arm is increasingly integrating remotely piloted and autonomous aircraft with its crewed aviation forces. 700X Naval Air Squadron is the Royal Navy’s specialist uncrewed-aircraft unit and provides training, operational support, research and evaluation of remotely piloted air systems and other emerging technologies.

==== Current systems ====
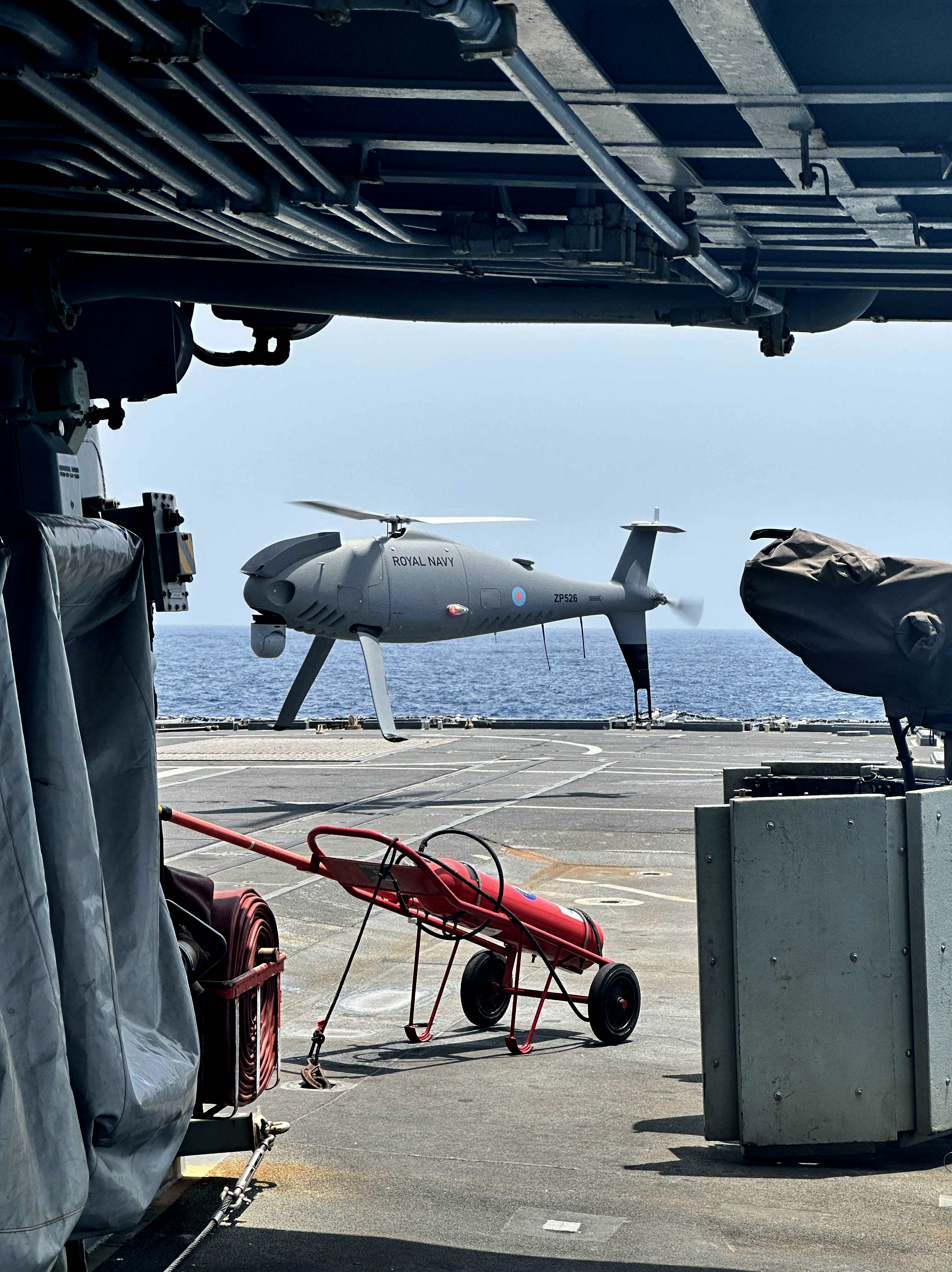
Peregrine (Schiebel Camcopter S-100) aboard HMS Lancaster

As of 2024, the Royal Navy operated a number of small Unmanned aerial vehicles (UAV), including the AeroVironment Puma AE and Ebee Vision. In 2024, the Navy reported that there were a total of nine qualified Puma teams, six of which were dedicated to supporting the Royal Marines in 40 and 45 Commando. As of 2024, a total of 75 Puma AE, 15 Puma LE (long endurance) and 39 AeroVironment Wasp III UAVs were in the UK inventory.

The FAA's inventory was further boosted with the addition of the Peregrine rotary-wing UAV which started trials on HMS Lancaster in August 2024. In 2025 it was announced that, as part of its deployment east of Suez, HMS Prince of Wales will carry a small fleet of Malloy Aeronautics T150 UAVs. The drone is designed to provide lightweight logistics/transport support for Royal Navy deployments. Nine T-150 drones are operated by 700X Naval Air Squadron. In August 2026, trials were carried out deploying the T-150B heavy-lift UAV from the River-class patrol vessel Trent.

==== Future development ====
A number of unmanned systems are under development for the Fleet Air Arm including fixed-wing UAVs, envisaged for potential operation from the Queen Elizabeth-class carriers. These programs are in the conceptual or planning stages under a program known as Project Vixen.

The 2026 defence investment plan (DIP) envisages the establishment of "Hybrid Carrier Air Wings" through the investment of about £240m investment in Project PANTHEON, the development of autonomous systems as part of the Hybrid Carrier Air Wing. "Early" trials are anticipated for jet-powered drones to operate alongside the F-35B force under Project VANQUISH.

Future autonomous helicopters may be based on the prototype developed under Project Proteus. The DIP noted that "Proteus has demonstrated the potential of large uncrewed air systems operating alongside crewed aircraft in future hybrid air wings to play a key role in anti-submarine operations under the Atlantic Bastion concept".

== Squadrons and flights ==
A Fleet Air Arm flying squadron is formally titled Naval Air Squadron (NAS), a title used as a suffix to the squadron number. The FAA assigns numbers in the 700–799 range to training and operational conversion squadrons and numbers in the 800–899 range to operational squadrons. Exceptions to the 700–799 include operational conversion squadrons which also hold some form of operational commitment where they are then titled 800–899. During WWII the 1700 and 1800 ranges were also used for operational squadrons.

Active FAA squadrons
| Unit | Type | Aircraft | Base | Role | Notes |
Flying squadrons
| 700X Naval Air Squadron | UAV | AeroVironment Wasp III, AeroVironment Puma AE/LE, Peregrine ISR, T-150 logistics support UAVs | RNAS Culdrose | Remotely Piloted Aircraft System shipborne flights | Provides HQ function for Puma AE/LE and other UAV flights; serves as evaluation unit for any future UAV systems selected by the Royal Navy |
| 700X Naval Air Squadron | UAV | AeroVironment Wasp III, AeroVironment Puma AE/LE, Peregrine ISR, T-150 logistics support UAVs | RNAS Culdrose | RPAS future trials unit | Provides HQ function for Puma AE/LE and other UAV flights; serves as evaluation unit for any future UAV systems selected by the Royal Navy |
| 703 Naval Air Squadron | Fixed-wing | Grob Prefect | RAF Barkston Heath | Elementary flying training | Part of the Joint Elementary Flying Training School (JEFTS) |
| 705 Naval Air Squadron | Rotary | Eurocopter Juno HT1 | RAF Shawbury | Basic and advanced multi-engine helicopter training | Part of 2 Maritime Air Wing (within 1 FTS) alongside 660 Squadron AAC and 202 Squadron RAF |
| 727 Naval Air Squadron | Fixed-wing | Grob Tutor T1 | RNAS Yeovilton | Pilot grading and Air Experience/Elementary Flying Training | Elevation of the Royal Naval Flying Training Flight to squadron status |
| 744 Naval Air Squadron | UAV | Stalker, Peregrine and Autonomous Collaborative Platform programmes | MOD Boscombe Down | Joint Uncrewed Air System Test and Evaluation Squadron (JUAS TES) | Tri-service, part of the Air and Space Warfare Centre, role transfer from No. 216 Squadron RAF |
| 750 Naval Air Squadron | Fixed-wing | Beechcraft Avenger T1 | RNAS Culdrose | RN Observer and RAF Weapon System Operator training | Operates within UKMFTS |
| 809 Naval Air Squadron | Fixed-wing | F-35B Lightning | RAF Marham | Carrier strike | Operates as part of No. 1 Group RAF under RAF Air Command |
| 814 Naval Air Squadron | Rotary | Merlin HM2 | RNAS Culdrose | Anti-submarine warfare (small ship flights) | Merged with 829 NAS in 2018 |
| 815 Naval Air Squadron | Rotary | Wildcat HMA2 | RNAS Yeovilton | Attack/ASW (small ship flights) | |
| 820 Naval Air Squadron | Rotary | Merlin HM2 | RNAS Culdrose | Anti-submarine warfare (carrier air group) | Attached to both HMS Queen Elizabeth and HMS Prince of Wales's air groups Merged with 849 NAS in April 2020. |
| 820 Naval Air Squadron | Rotary | Merlin HM2 Crowsnest | RNAS Culdrose | Airborne surveillance | Attached to both HMS Queen Elizabeth and HMS Prince of Wales's air groups Merged with 849 NAS in April 2020. |
| 824 Naval Air Squadron | Rotary | Merlin HM2 | RNAS Culdrose | Conversion Training (Merlin ASW) | Will have responsibility for all conversion training for Merlin HM2 |
| 824 Naval Air Squadron | Rotary | Merlin HM2 | RNAS Culdrose | Conversion Training (Merlin Crowsnest) | Will have responsibility for all conversion training for Merlin HM2 |
| 825 Naval Air Squadron | Rotary | Wildcat HMA2 | RNAS Yeovilton | Conversion Training (Wildcat) | Formed by merger of 700W NAS and 702 NAS in August 2014 |
| 845 Naval Air Squadron | Rotary | Merlin HC4/HC4A | RNAS Yeovilton | Very High Readiness Medium lift | Part of CHF |
| 846 Naval Air Squadron | Rotary | Merlin HC4 | RNAS Yeovilton | Extremely High Readiness Medium lift | Part of CHF |
| 846 Naval Air Squadron | Rotary | Merlin HC4 | RNAS Yeovilton | Conversion Training (Merlin Commando) | Part of CHF |
| 847 Naval Air Squadron | Rotary | Wildcat AH1 | RNAS Yeovilton | Battlefield reconnaissance and support | Part of CHF |
Non-flying squadrons
| 1700 Naval Air Squadron | Rotary and fixed-wing | | RNAS Culdrose | Flight deck activities, logistic and catering support, operations, engineering Support, even medical assistance | Technical support Formerly Maritime Aviation Support Force (MASF) |
| 1710 Naval Air Squadron | Rotary and fixed-wing | | HMNB Portsmouth | Specialist aircraft repair, modification and scientific support | Technical support |

An additional flying unit of the Royal Navy is the FOST Helicopter Support Unit based at HMS Raleigh in Cornwall. This unit is not part of the Fleet Air Arm, but is directly under the control of Fleet Operational Sea Training, operated by British International Helicopters (BIH). BIH also support various Royal Navy and NATO exercises with passenger and freight transfer services and transfers by hoist, for ships exercising both in the Atlantic and the North Sea.

The Royal Navy share both operational and training duties on the Lightning II with the RAF under a banner organisation called the Lightning Force, which will operate in the same manner as Joint Force Harrier.

== Traditions and Insignia ==
Fleet Air Arm pilot wings

Fleet Air Arm branch badge

The FAA is known for its use of the 'Fleet Air Arm Zig Zag': a light blue zig zag on a dark blue background. The pattern is thought to have belonged to the "Perch Club", membership of which was restricted to those who had completed 100 deck landings without an accident. The zig zag was thought to have been taken from a Creeping Line Ahead, a parallel search pattern performed by FAA aircraft in a carrier task group.

Today, the dark blue background represents the Royal Navy; the colour of the zigzag represents the Royal Flying Corps, from which the Royal Naval Air Service was born; and the zigzag shape represents a nod to the Royal Artillery (red zigzag on blue background), given that the first people sent aloft in tethered balloons to spot the fall of shot were Royal Artillery observers. It was these observers who became early members of the Royal Flying Corps.

Aircrew wear flying badges, such as pilots wearing a pair of gold albatross wings. The wings badges also feature a crown and fouled anchor in the centre, to reflect the maritime element of the flying undertaken. Wings are worn on the left sleeve of naval aviators, unlike their other service counterparts.

Members of the Fleet Air Arm continue to be known as WAFUs. WAFU ("wet and f**king useless") is said to actually derive from "Weapon and Fuel Users", a stores category for clothing.

== Notable members ==
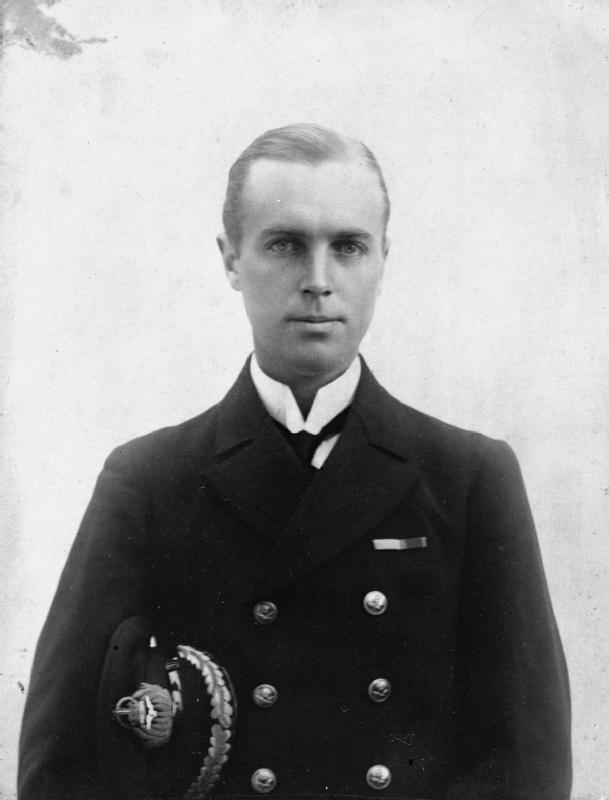
Vice-Admiral Richard Bell Davies, first naval aviator to receive the VC and the first naval aviator of the Fleet Air Arm to reach flag rank

- Vice-Admiral Richard Bell Davies (1886–1966): the first naval aviator to receive the VC and the first naval aviator of the Fleet Air Arm to reach flag rank
- Vice-Admiral Sir Lumley Lyster (1888–1957): drew up attack plan in 1935 that was used for the Battle of Taranto five years later
- Admiral Sir Reginald Portal (1894–1983): naval aviator who was the younger brother of Marshal of the Royal Air Force Lord Portal (1893–1971)
- Captain Henry Fancourt (1900–2004): a pioneering aviator, he had a distinguished career in naval aviation until 1949. Worked for Short Bros and Hartland.
- Ralph Richardson (1902–1983): English stage and screen actor, volunteered as a navy pilot during Second World War and rose to the rank of lieutenant-commander in the Air Branch.
- Admiral of the Fleet Sir Caspar John (1903–1984): First Sea Lord 1960–63 and the first British naval aviator to reach the highest rank within the RN.
- Admiral Sir Walter Couchman (1905–1981): naval observer who earned his pilot's wings too, he led the fly-past for the Coronation Fleet Review in June 1953.
- Laurence Olivier (1907–1989): English stage and screen actor and director, volunteered as a navy pilot during the Second World War and rose to the rank of lieutenant in the Air Branch.
- Duncan Hamilton: English Grand Prix driver and winner of the 1953 24 Hours of Le Mans.
- Lieutenant Commander (A) Eugene Esmonde (1909–1942): posthumously awarded the Victoria Cross for leading 825 Naval Air Squadron Swordfish torpedo bombers in an attack on German capital ships during the "Channel Dash".
- Lieutenant Commander Roy Sydney Baker-Falkner (1916-1944): awarded the Distinguished Service Order for leading Operation Tungsten attack on the German battleship Tirpitz.
- Michael Hordern (1911–1995): actor, served as fighter controller during World War II.
- Jeffrey Quill (1913–1996): RAF officer and Spitfire test pilot (Vickers-Armstrongs) who served five months with Fleet Air Arm as T/Lt.Cdr RNVR in 1944–1945, helping to develop better carrier deck-landings with the Supermarine Seafire, the naval version of the Spitfire.
- Kenneth More (1914–1982): actor, including films such as Reach for the Sky and Sink the Bismarck.
- Commander Charles Lamb (1914–1981): author of the Second World War Fleet Air Arm autobiography War in a Stringbag.
- Vice-Admiral Sir Peter Compston (1915–2000): served briefly in the British Army, then in the RAF for two years, before transferring as a pilot to the Royal Navy in 1938.
- Commander Stanley Orr (1916–2003): was the highest scoring fighter ace of the Royal Navy during the Second World War.
- Admiral Sir (Leslie) Derek Empson (1918–1997): naval pilot who joined the Royal Navy as a naval rating. In his flying career, executed 782 aircraft carrier landings without a mishap.
- Rear-Admiral Cedric Kenelm Roberts (1918–2011): (always known as 'Chico') a distinguished naval pilot who joined the Royal Navy as a naval rating in 1940. He was personal pilot to Vice-Admiral Lumley Lyster in 1943, commanded three Naval Air Squadrons and was shot down during the Korean War. Later, he commanded three Naval Air Stations and ended his naval flying career as Flag Officer Naval Flying Training 1968–71.
- Lieutenant-Commander Charles Wines ("Charlie Wines") (1917–1991): joined the Royal Navy as a Supply Assistant, flew Swordfish torpedo bomber as a rating pilot in the Second World War. Commissioned as a pilot in 1944 he later spent more than twenty years, in the same job as a serving and retired officer, as the FAA Drafting Officer and as such the career manager for thousands of FAA ratings.
- Rear-Admiral Dennis Cambell (1907–2000): inventor of the angled flight deck for aircraft carriers in 1951.
- Rear-Admiral Nick Goodhart (1919–2011): inventor of the mirror-sight deck landing system for aircraft carriers in 1951.
- Captain Eric "Winkle" Brown (1919–2016): holds the world record for the most types of aircraft flown by an individual (487 types). As a test pilot he made the first-ever jet landing on an aircraft carrier in December 1945.
- Lieutenant Commander John Moffat (1919–2016): crippled the Bismarck on 26 May 1941.
- Admiral Sir John Treacher (1924–2018): naval pilot who was promoted rear-admiral at the age of 45 and held four important flag appointments before leaving the Royal Navy in 1977, despite many expecting him to become First Sea Lord, for a career in business. Was at the helm of Westland during the political drama of the 1980s.
- Admiral Sir Ray Lygo (1924–2012): naval pilot who joined the Royal Navy as a naval rating in 1942 and who reached First Sea Lord in 1978, led a successful career in industry and was chief executive and deputy chairman of British Aerospace in the 1980s.
- Sir George Martin (1926–2016): record producer for The Beatles.
- Admiral of the Fleet Sir Ben Bathurst (1936–2025): First Sea Lord 1993–95 and the last Royal Navy officer to be promoted to five-star rank.
- Rear-Admiral Sir Robert Woodard (c.1939–): naval aviator commanded two Naval Air Squadrons, two warships, a Naval Air Station, the Clyde submarine base and ended his career as the Flag Officer Royal Yachts 1990–95, the only aviator to command the Royal Yacht HMY Britannia.
- Commander Nigel David "Sharkey" Ward (1943–2024): commanded 801 Naval Air Squadron during the 1982 Falklands War.
- Rear-Admiral Iain Henderson (c. 1948–): the first officer, and first naval officer, to hold the modern appointment of Air Officer Commanding 3 Group 2000–01.
- Vice-Admiral Sir Adrian Johns (c. 1952–) is the first naval aviator to hold the post of Governor of Gibraltar.
- Commander HRH Prince Andrew, Duke of York (later Andrew Mountbatten-Windsor; 1960–): served during the Falklands War 1982 and for some years afterwards.
- Captain Brian Young (1930–2009): former Sea Hawk pilot, later commanded the task group for Operation Paraquet during the Falklands War.
- John Cecil Moore English pilot, author and conservationist. Born in Tewksbury 1907 died Bristol 1967. Served in WW2

Some 64 naval pilots and nine observers have reached flag rank in the Royal Navy and four Royal Marines pilots general rank in the Royal Marines. Four of these admirals with pilot's 'wings' were air engineering officers (test pilots) and two were supply officers; two of the non-executive officers reached four-star rank: a supply officer, Admiral Sir Brian Brown (1934–), and a Royal Marine, General Sir Peter Whiteley (1920–2016).

- At least 21 naval Air Engineer Officers (AEOs) have reached flag rank (including the four test pilots (see above)).

== See also ==
- List of active United Kingdom military aircraft
- List of Fleet Air Arm aircraft squadrons
- List of aircraft wings of the Royal Navy
- List of Fleet Air Arm groups
- List of all naval aircraft current and former of the United Kingdom
- List of aircraft of the Fleet Air Arm
- Fleet Air Arm Memorial
- List of Fleet Air Arm battle honours
- List of air stations of the Royal Navy
- Fleet Requirements and Aircraft Direction Unit
- Fleet Requirements Unit
- Air Direction Training Unit
- Royal Navy and Fleet Air Arm aerobatic teams
