= The Sharks (Royal Navy) =

Aerobatics display team of the Royal Navy

- Royal Navy helicopter display team patch
- Active: 1975-1992
- Country: United Kingdom
- Branch: Royal Navy
- Type: Aerobatic display team
- Role: Public display / formation aerobatics
- Size: Four helicopters
- Part of: 705 Naval Air Squadron
- Home station: RNAS Culdrose
- Colors: Red
- Equipment: Westland Gazelle

The Sharks were a Royal Navy helicopter display team formed in 1975 from instructors of 705 Naval Air Squadron at RNAS Culdrose, Cornwall. The team flew the Westland-Aérospatiale Gazelle HT.2 and its members combined display flying with their normal duties as helicopter instructors.

The Sharks became known for close-formation and high-speed opposition manoeuvres and were described by the Royal Navy as one of the few helicopter display teams in the world at the time. The formal Sharks team was disbanded after the 1992 display season, although Royal Navy helicopter display flying with Gazelles continued subsequently.

== History ==
=== Formation ===
The Sharks were established at RNAS Culdrose in 1975 from instructors of 705 Naval Air Squadron, which was responsible for basic helicopter training. The squadron had replaced its previous aircraft with the Westland Gazelle HT.2 in 1974.

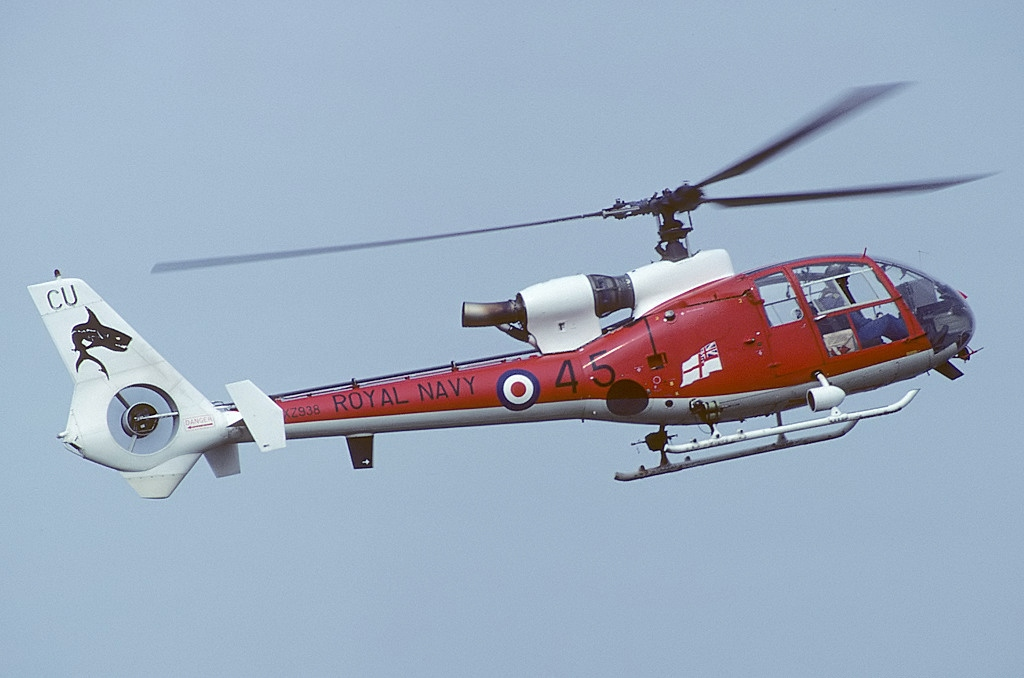
A Westland Gazelle of The Sharks

The inaugural team used six aircraft and initially displayed at naval establishment air days and open days during the summer of 1975. Australian exchange officer Lieutenant John "Bomber" Brown was a member of the inaugural team and flew the solo position, while Trevor Rieck flew as number five.

According to Rieck, Brown originated the name "Sharks", having considered the shape of the Gazelle's tail to resemble that of a shark.

The team was staffed by Qualified Helicopter Instructors from 705 Naval Air Squadron, with volunteers recruited for each display season. The display flying was undertaken outside the pilots' normal instructional duties, with practice taking place early in the morning before the instructional day and displays being flown at weekends.

=== Display flying ===
The Sharks' display incorporated close-formation flying and opposition manoeuvres, with the Royal Navy's historical account describing an eight-minute sequence in which the helicopters brought their rotor blades to within 15 feet (4.6 m) of each other at closing speeds exceeding 200 miles per hour (320 km/h).

A contemporary Navy News report in June 1990 described the display as lasting ten minutes and involving close-formation flying and high-speed opposition manoeuvres, with rotor blades passing within 15 feet of one another at closing speeds of 200 mph.

The team performed at air displays in the United Kingdom and elsewhere in Europe.

=== 1977 accident ===
On 13 June 1977, six Gazelles were taking part in a practice for the Sharks display when two aircraft, XX415 and XW859, were involved in a fatal accident over Praa Sands, Cornwall. The official investigation recorded that the formation was in a left turn at approximately 250 feet (76 m) and 85 knots (157 km/h; 98 mph) when the two aircraft suffered in-flight damage and subsequently fell into the sea.

Three people were killed in the accident: the pilot and passenger of XX415 and the pilot of XW859. The other four aircraft involved in the practice returned to RNAS Culdrose.

The 1977 display season was cancelled following the accident. According to Rieck, the team was reorganised for 1978 as a four-aircraft formation, with the "box" formation becoming its basic formation and a solo aircraft incorporated into the display. The four-aircraft formation subsequently became the team's standard configuration.

=== 1980s ===
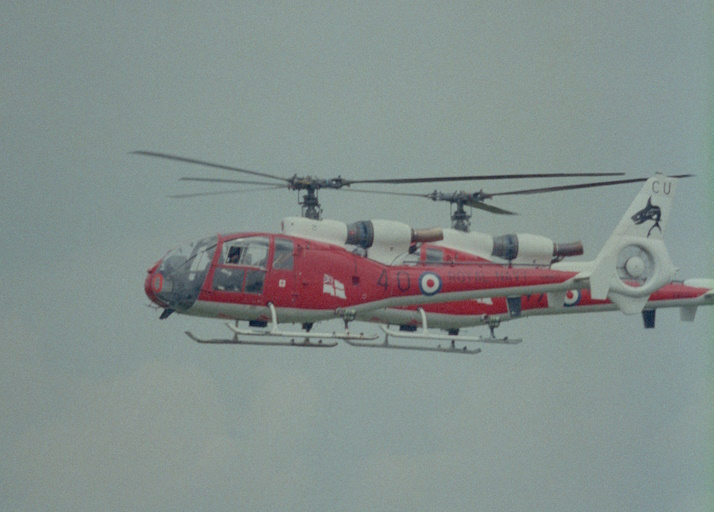
Arrival at the International Air Tattoo 1987, RAF Fairford

During the 1980s the Sharks performed extensively at air shows in the United Kingdom and Europe. Rieck recalled that the team flew at 36 events during the 1986 season, including two visits to Belgium, and that on some occasions two displays were undertaken during the same weekend.

Rieck also recalled that the 1982 team developed an "opposition break", in which the formation approached the crowd before separating in opposite directions, and that the manoeuvre subsequently became part of the Sharks' display routine.

The team continued to be composed of qualified helicopter instructors, with volunteers recruited for successive display seasons.

Royal Australian Navy helicopter instructors serving with 705 Squadron on exchange also participated in the Sharks. The Royal Australian Navy's exchange programme with 705 Squadron ran from 1963 until 1996 and involved 33 officers in total.

=== 1990–1991 ===
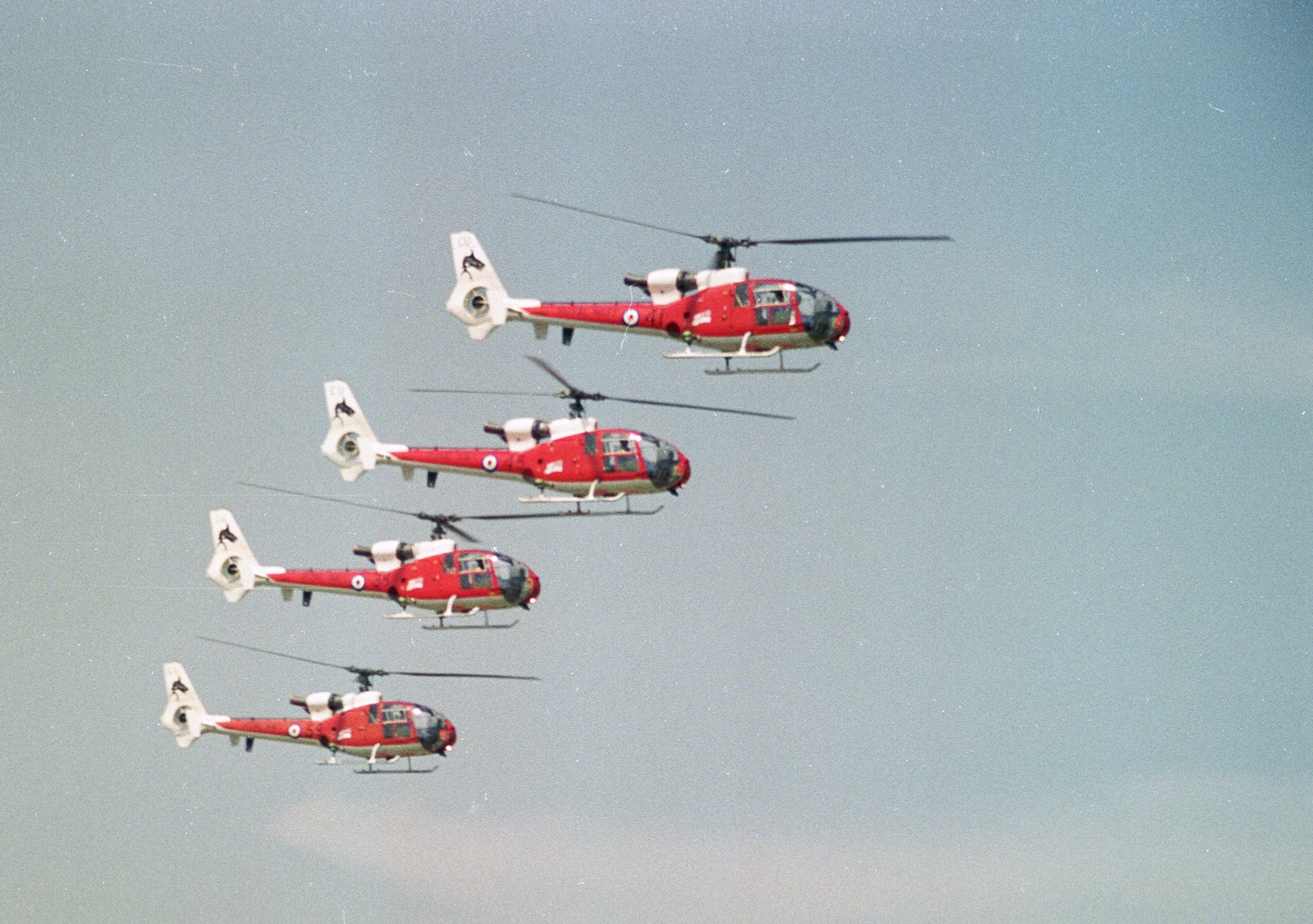
The Sharks; At the International Tattoo, RAF Boscombe Down, June 13 1992

In 1990 the Sharks operated a four-aircraft display while six personnel were associated with the team. The team was led by Lieutenant Commander Mark Osman, with Lieutenant Wayne Taylor as team manager and Lieutenant Andy Holley in charge of flight operations; the other members were Lieutenant Richard King, Flight Lieutenant Mai Groombridge of the RAF and Lieutenant Kev Mathieson.

The six members were volunteers whose normal duties were as helicopter instructors. They practised early in the morning and performed displays at weekends and major air shows during the summer.

The scale of the team's activity was recorded in Parliament in 1992. The Royal Navy Helicopter Display Team, identified as "The Sharks", gave 42 public performances during 1991 and cost £139,000 during the 1991–92 financial year.

The same parliamentary answer recorded commercial sponsorship associated with the display team, including Westland Helicopters, Fields Aviation, Smiths Industries, Pusser's Rum, Securicor Carlton and Maxon Radios.

=== Disbandment and subsequent Gazelle displays ===
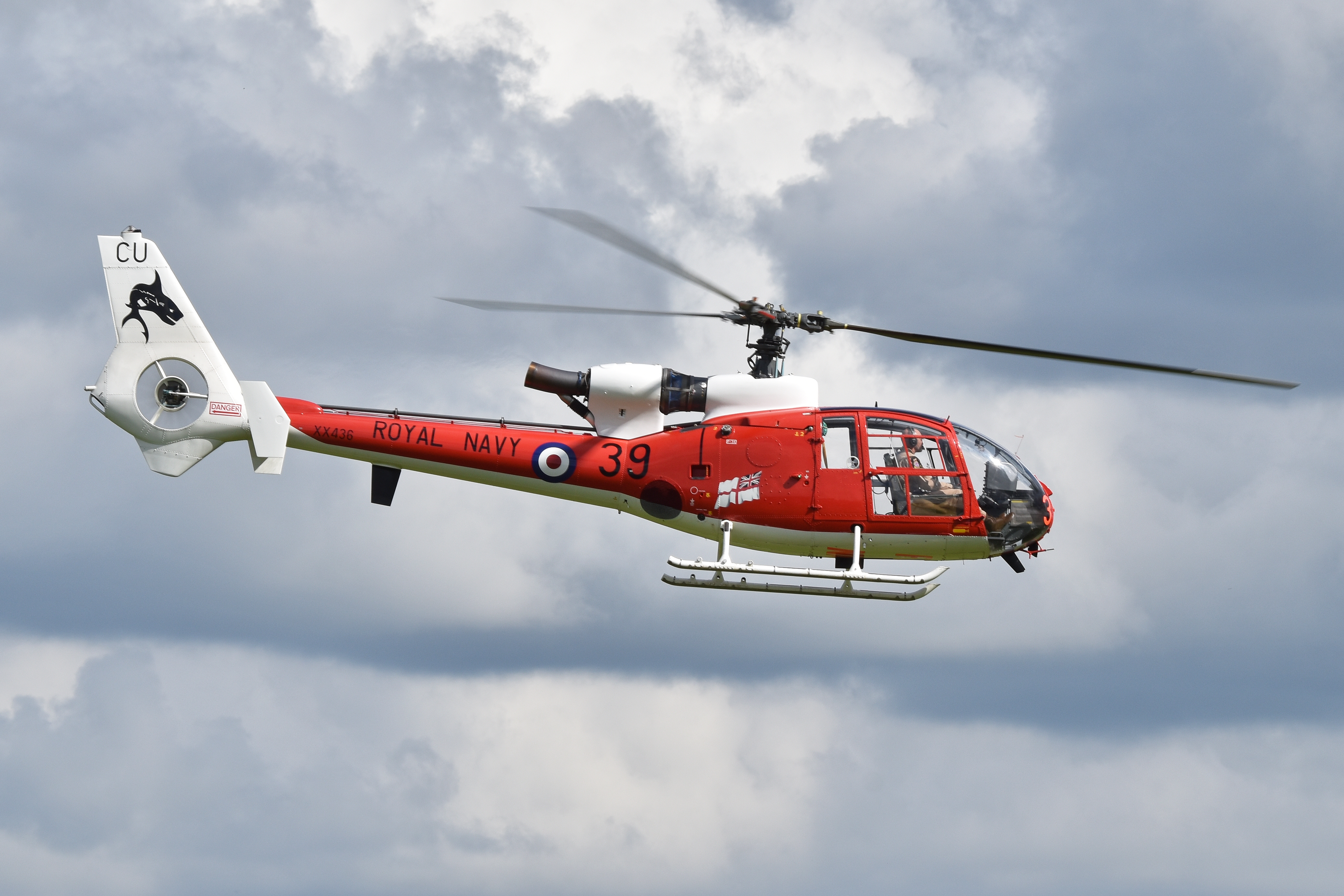
Westland Gazelle HT.2 ‘XX436 CU-39’, 705 Squadron

The Sharks were disbanded after the 1992 display season because of economic constraints. The end of the formal Sharks team did not immediately end Royal Navy helicopter display flying. During the following seasons, 705 Squadron continued to provide Gazelles for display duties, including two-aircraft formations. A contemporary 1992 air-show record continued to identify 705 Squadron Gazelles with the Sharks display team.

In 1993, a Royal Navy Helicopter Display Team operated a pair of Gazelles during the UK air-show season. A four-aircraft Sharks formation was temporarily reassembled for selected events in 1995, despite the formal team having been disbanded in 1992.

In 1996, Royal Australian Navy exchange officer Jeremy Butler led one of the display pairs, while the Sharks name was subsequently dropped. The Royal Navy paid off the Gazelle in 1996, ending its use in the service's helicopter display activity.

== Legacy ==
The Royal Navy subsequently established another helicopter display team using the Westland Lynx. The team began in 2001 as the "Lynx Pair"; the Royal Navy describes it as the first official Royal Navy flying display team since the Sharks.

The team subsequently became known as the Black Cats. Several manoeuvres developed by the Sharks were later incorporated into the displays of the Royal Navy's helicopter display team.

== See also ==
- Fleet Air Arm
- Royal Navy Historic Flight
- Blue Herons
- Fred's Five
- Simon's Sircus
- Phoenix Five
- Black Cats
- Royal Navy and Fleet Air Arm aerobatic teams
