= Rough Diamond =

Rough Diamond or Rough Diamonds may refer to:

== Minerals ==
- Rough diamond, a diamond which has not yet been cut

== Television ==
- Rough Diamond (2007 TV series), a drama series by BBC Northern Ireland
- Rough Diamonds (2023 TV series), a drama series by Netflix
- Rough Diamond, the US title of the British TV comedy drama Diamond Geezer

== Film ==
- The Rough Diamond, a 1921 American film; see List of Fox Film films
- Rough Diamonds (film), a 1994 Australian drama film starring Jason Donovan

== Music ==
- Rough Diamond, album by Rough Diamond, a band formed by David Byron
- Rough Diamond, the debut album of Madleen Kane
- Rough Diamonds (album), an album by Bad Company
- Rough Diamonds (EP), an EP by End of Fashion

== Other ==
- Rough Diamonds display team, a Royal Navy aerobatic display team active 1965–1969

== See also ==
- Diamonds in the Rough (disambiguation)
