= 705 Naval Air Squadron =

Flying squadron of the Royal Navy's Fleet Air Arm

705 Naval Air Squadron ~~705 (Catapult) Flight FAA~~
- Squadron Badge
- Active: Royal Air Force; 1936–1939; Royal Navy: 1939–1940; 1945; 1947–present
- Country: United Kingdom
- Branch: Royal Navy
- Type: Fleet Air Arm Second Line Squadron
- Role: Basic helicopter flying training
- Part of: Fleet Air Arm and No.1 Flying Training School
- Home station: RAF Shawbury
- Motto: Expertam docemus artem (Latin for 'We teach the art')
- Aircraft: Airbus Juno HT1
- Decorations: Boyd Trophy 1983
- Website: Official website

Commanders
- Current commander: Lieutenant Commander Martin Pickles, RN

Insignia
- Squadron Badge Description: Barry wavy of ten white and blue, four wings conjoined in saltire gold (1948)
- Identification Markings: 089-093 (Shark and Swordfish to May 1939); then B&A+ (Swordfish); to ARIA+ (Swordfish March 1945); 501-515 and 700-712 (all types from May 1947); 520-549 (all types July 1956); (5)40-(5)67 (July 1965)
- Fin Shore Codes: GJ (from May 1947); CU (May 1956 to July 1965)

705 Naval Air Squadron (705 NAS), sometimes referred to as 705 Squadron, is a Fleet Air Arm (FAA) naval air squadron of the United Kingdom's Royal Navy (RN). Based at RAF Shawbury in Shropshire, it forms part of No. 1 Flying Training School and provides helicopter flying training to pilots and aircrew of the Royal Navy, British Army and Royal Air Force. The squadron currently operates the Juno HT1 and forms part of 2 Maritime Air Wing.

The squadron was formed as a flight in 1936 from No. 447 Flight RAF, operating Fairey Swordfish aircraft from Royal Navy battlecruisers. It became a squadron in 1939 and served during the Second World War before being disbanded in 1940. Re-formed in 1945 and again in 1947, it became involved in the evaluation of helicopters for naval use and subsequently developed a role in Royal Navy helicopter flying training. The squadron moved to RNAS Culdrose in 1957 and operated a succession of helicopters, including the Westland Dragonfly, Hiller HT-1, Sikorsky S-55, Westland Whirlwind and Westland Gazelle. Between 1975 and 1992, its instructors also formed the Sharks helicopter display team.

In April 1997, 705 NAS moved to RAF Shawbury as part of the Defence Helicopter Flying School (DHFS), where it operated the Squirrel and provided advanced single-engine rotary-wing training within the tri-service helicopter training system. In 2018, the squadron transitioned to the UK Military Flying Training System and the Juno HT1. It subsequently became part of No. 1 Flying Training School and continues to provide joint helicopter training while retaining a Royal Navy identity and naval training focus.

== History ==
=== Catapult Flight and Second World War ===
No. 705 (Catapult) Flight was formed at RAF Kalafrana, Malta, on 15 July 1936 by redesignating part of No. 444 (Fleet Reconnaissance) Flight, FAA. The flight was assigned to the battlecruisers of the Mediterranean Fleet and operated Fairey Swordfish and Blackburn Shark torpedo bomber floatplanes. The Flight was transferred to Admiralty control on 24 May 1939 and on the same day was disbanded at RAF Kalafrana and re-formed as 705 Squadron, FAA.

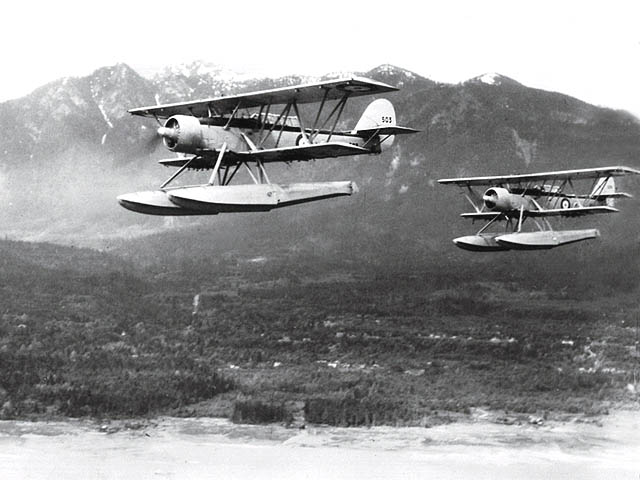
Blackburn Shark floatplanes; as used by 705 Squadron

By the outbreak of the Second World War, its aircraft were embarked aboard the name ship of her class, the battlecruiser HMS Renown (1916) and her sister ship HMS Repulse, with Swordfish and Shark floatplanes. The aircraft were equipped with floats so that they could be launched from the ships by catapult and then recovered from the water by crane.

During the early part of the Second World War, 705 Squadron served on the North America and West Indies Station, where it was employed in protecting troop convoys. It returned to RNAS Lee-on-Solent, Hampshire, in 1939 and was disbanded on 21 January 1940, when it was absorbed into 700 Naval Air Squadron.

=== Swordfish replacement training ===
705 Naval Air Squadron re-formed at RNAS Ronaldsway (HMS Urley), Isle of Man, on 7 March 1945 as a Swordfish replacement crew-training unit. The requirement for the unit disappeared following VE Day, and the squadron was disbanded on 24 June 1945.

=== Helicopter development and Fleet Requirements Unit ===
705 Naval Air Squadron was re-commissioned at RNAS Gosport, Hampshire, on 7 May 1947, taking over the Sikorsky Hoverfly element of 771 Naval Air Squadron. It subsequently became the Fleet Air Arm's principal helicopter evaluation and requirements unit, undertaking helicopter trials, pilot training, air-sea rescue evaluation, equipment and technique development, torpedo-recovery work, transport duties, radar calibration and other specialist tasks.

On 1 February 1947, Lieutenant Ken Reed, who was then a member of a naval flight evaluating helicopters for the Admiralty, made the first official helicopter landing on a Royal Navy warship when he landed a Sikorsky Hoverfly on the fast battleship HMS Vanguard off Portland. The landing pre-dated the squadron's May 1947 re-commissioning.

During the late 1940s and early 1950s, 705 undertook a wide range of experimental work. A Sikorsky S-51 helicopter was evaluated during Arctic trials in 1949, while the squadron also provided detachments for Operation Sandstone, surveying beaches and ports in Ireland and the United Kingdom. The squadron subsequently evaluated the Sikorsky S-55 and also conducted experimental shipboard helicopter operations, including trials aboard the Fort ship RFA Fort Duquesne.

In February 1953, 705 Squadron took part in the relief effort following the North Sea flood of 1953. Nine of its helicopters were deployed from RNAS Gosport to Gilze-Rijen in the Netherlands, where they rescued 810 people and subsequently carried out supply-dropping and other relief tasks.

The squadron also took part in the Coronation Review of the Fleet at Spithead on 15 June 1953, leading the helicopter element of the flypast with its Westland Dragonflies.

=== Helicopter training ===
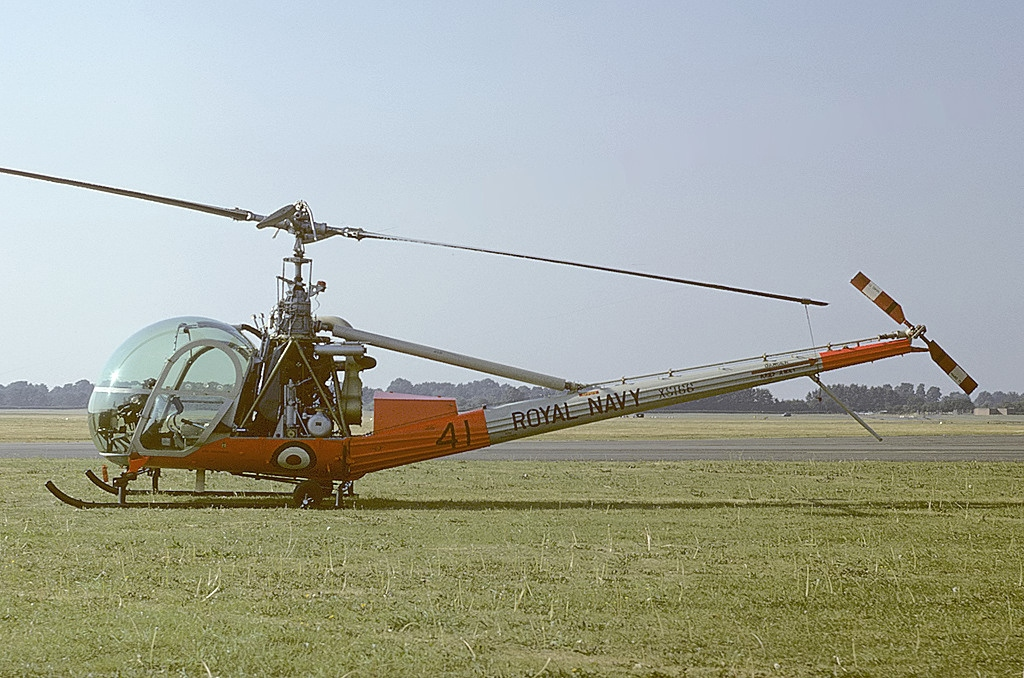
Hiller HT Mk 2 of 705 at RNAS Culdrose

By the mid-1950s, 705 Squadron's role had increasingly shifted towards helicopter training. In October 1955 it moved to RNAS Lee-on-Solent, Hampshire and later that year became a helicopter training squadron, continuing to use RNAS Gosport as a relief landing ground.

In November 1957 the Fleet Requirements Unit and search-and-rescue tasks were transferred to the newly formed 701 Naval Air Squadron. When 701 Squadron was disbanded in September 1958, the search-and-rescue role returned to 705 Squadron. The squadron subsequently moved to RNAS Culdrose, Cornwall, in the late 1950s. From March 1959 it was organised into three Flights: 'A' Flight for operational training, 'B' Flight for basic training and 'C' Flight for special trials.

During this period the squadron operated a succession of helicopters including the Westland Dragonfly, Hiller HT1, Sikorsky S55 and Westland Whirlwind.

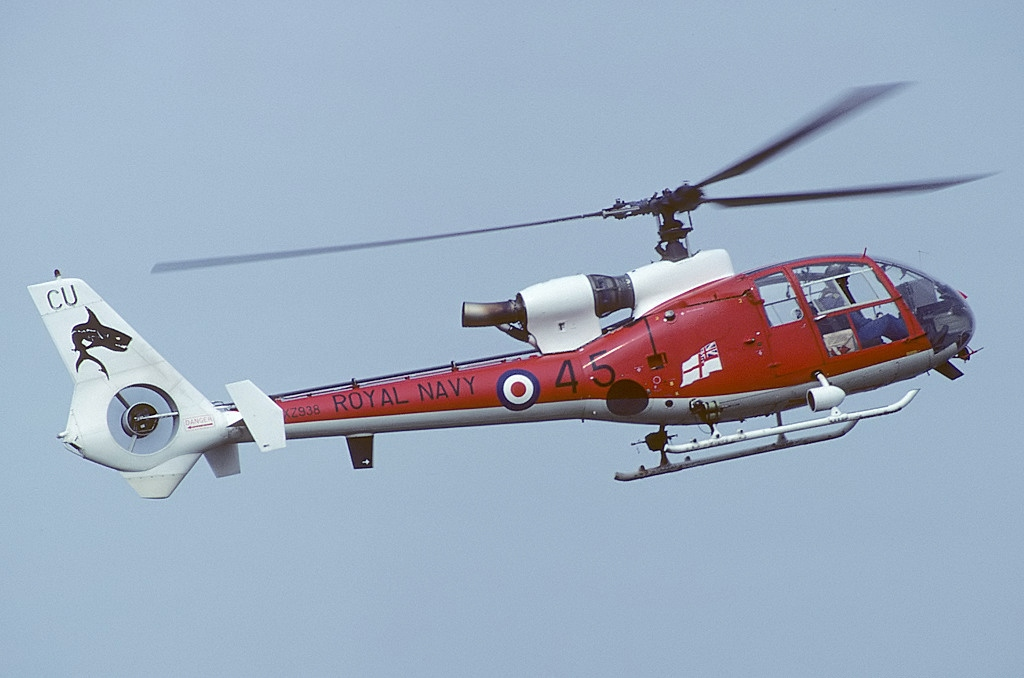
Westland Gazelle HT2 of 705 Squadron

The first Westland Gazelle HT.2 helicopters were received in March 1974, and by March 1975 the squadron was equipped entirely with Gazelles. From 1975, instructors from 705 also provided the Royal Navy's helicopter display capability. The principal team was The Sharks, while 705 also provided the two-aircraft "Pusser's Pair" and solo display aircraft. The Sharks were composed of volunteers who normally served as helicopter instructors with 705 Squadron.

Between 1975 and 1992 the Sharks helicopter display team performed at up to 20 air displays every year both in the UK and abroad.

In 1983, 705 Squadron was awarded the Boyd Trophy for its overall performance, training achievement, airmanship and contribution to the prestige of Naval Aviation.

=== Tri-service helicopter training ===
In April 1997, 705 Squadron was disbanded at RNAS Culdrose and re-formed at RAF Shawbury as part of the newly established Defence Helicopter Flying School (DHFS). It became the DHFS's Single Engine Advanced Rotary Wing training unit, operating the Eurocopter AS350 Écureuil, designated Squirrel HT.1 in British military service.

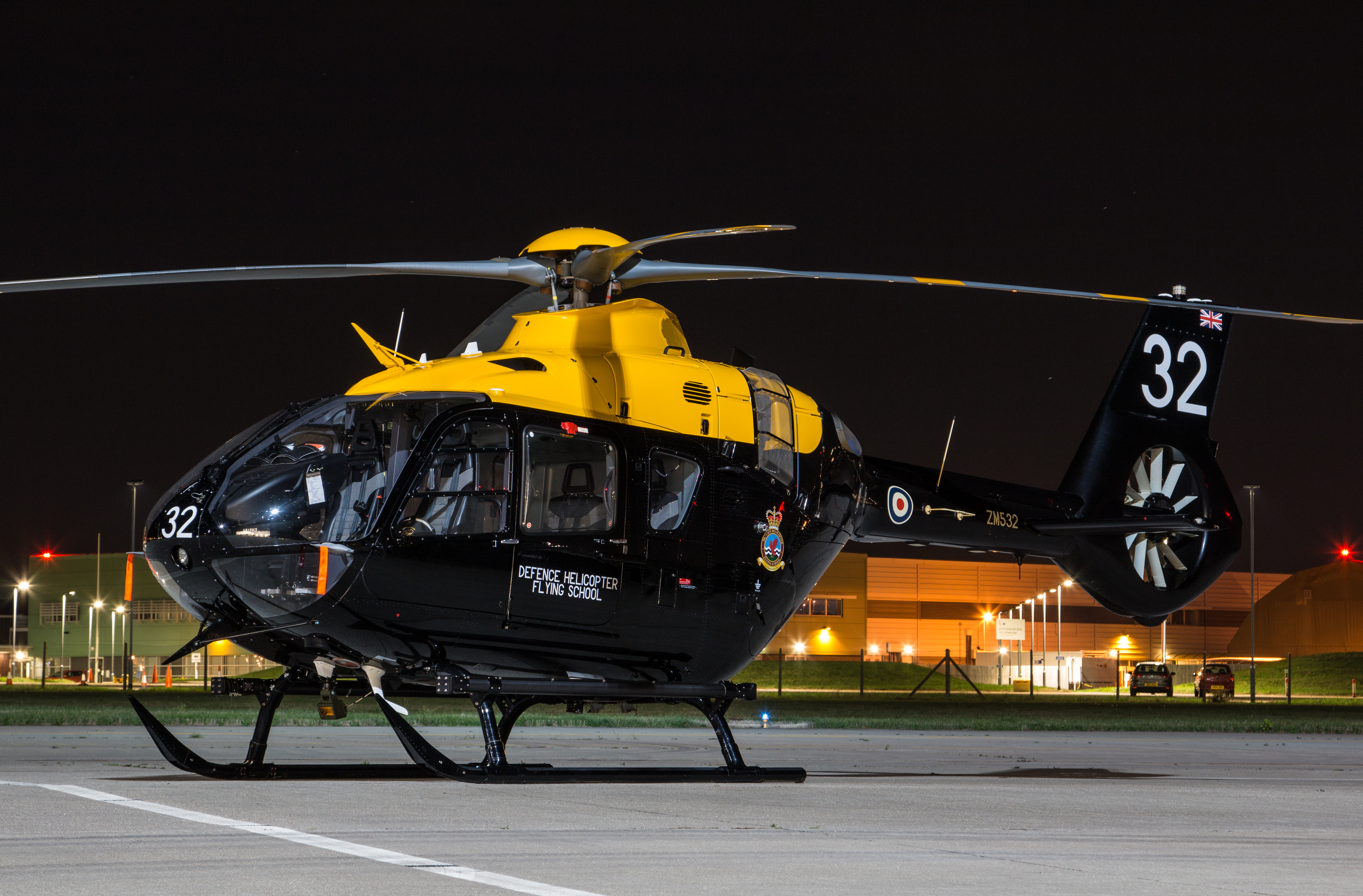
Juno HT1 of No. 1 Flying Training School

The squadron's role continued under the UK Military Flying Training System (UKMFTS). In 2018, it began operating the Juno HT1 light utility helicopter as part of the new rotary-wing training system. Since April 2018, 705 Squadron has trained pilots and aircrew from the Royal Navy, British Army and Royal Air Force as part of 2 Maritime Air Wing (2 MAW).

On 28 February 2020, the Defence Helicopter Flying School was re-badged as No. 1 Flying Training School (1 FTS). 705 Squadron remained at RAF Shawbury as part of the school, providing basic helicopter flying training to personnel from all three services.

Within No. 1 Flying Training School and under 2 Maritime Air Wing, 705 Squadron provides basic and advanced rotary wing flying training for all three services pilots and rear crew. As the busiest Squadron within 1 FTS, 705 Squadron teaches both pilots and crewman a vast number of different disciplines including advanced handling, instrument flying, medium and low level navigation, mountain flying and night flying including low level navigation with NVD.

In addition to pure flying training, 705 Squadron also provides a naval focus for naval aircrew operating within an otherwise joint service and largely civilian-run organisation. The Squadron is commanded by a Royal Navy Lieutenant Commander, and has a Royal Navy "Senior Pilot", while the Flight Commander billets are filled in by Qualified Helicopter Instructors from any of the three services. Naval graduates of DHFS are streamed towards Merlin HM2, Merlin HC4/4A Commando or Wildcat AH1 / Wildcat HMA2 training Squadrons.

== Aircraft flown ==
The squadron has flown a number of aircraft types since its formation, including:

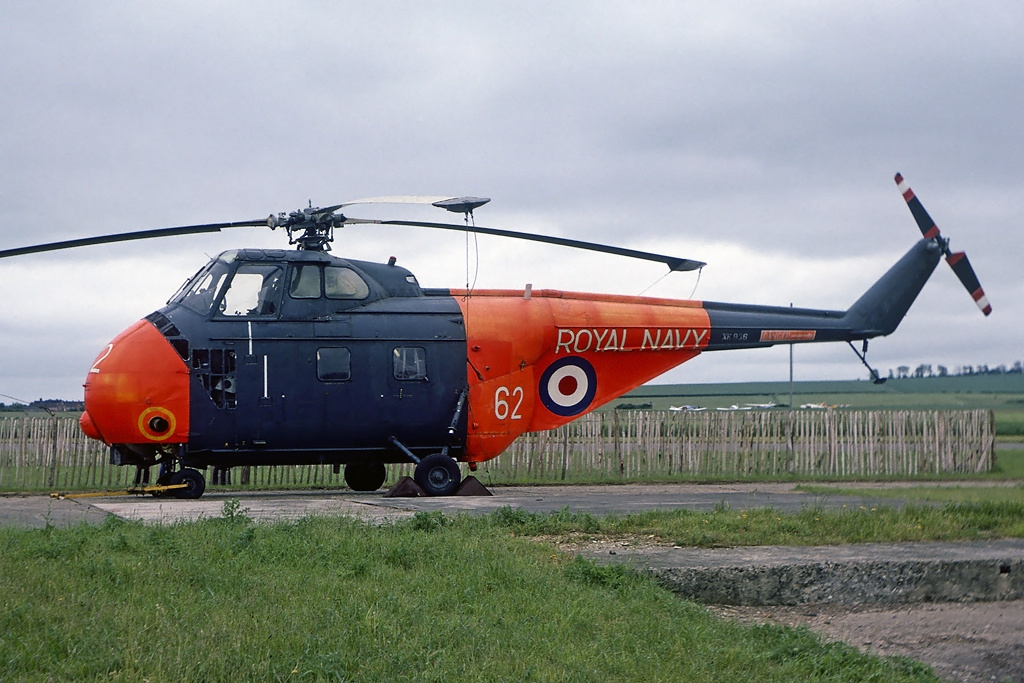
Westland Whirlwind HAS.7

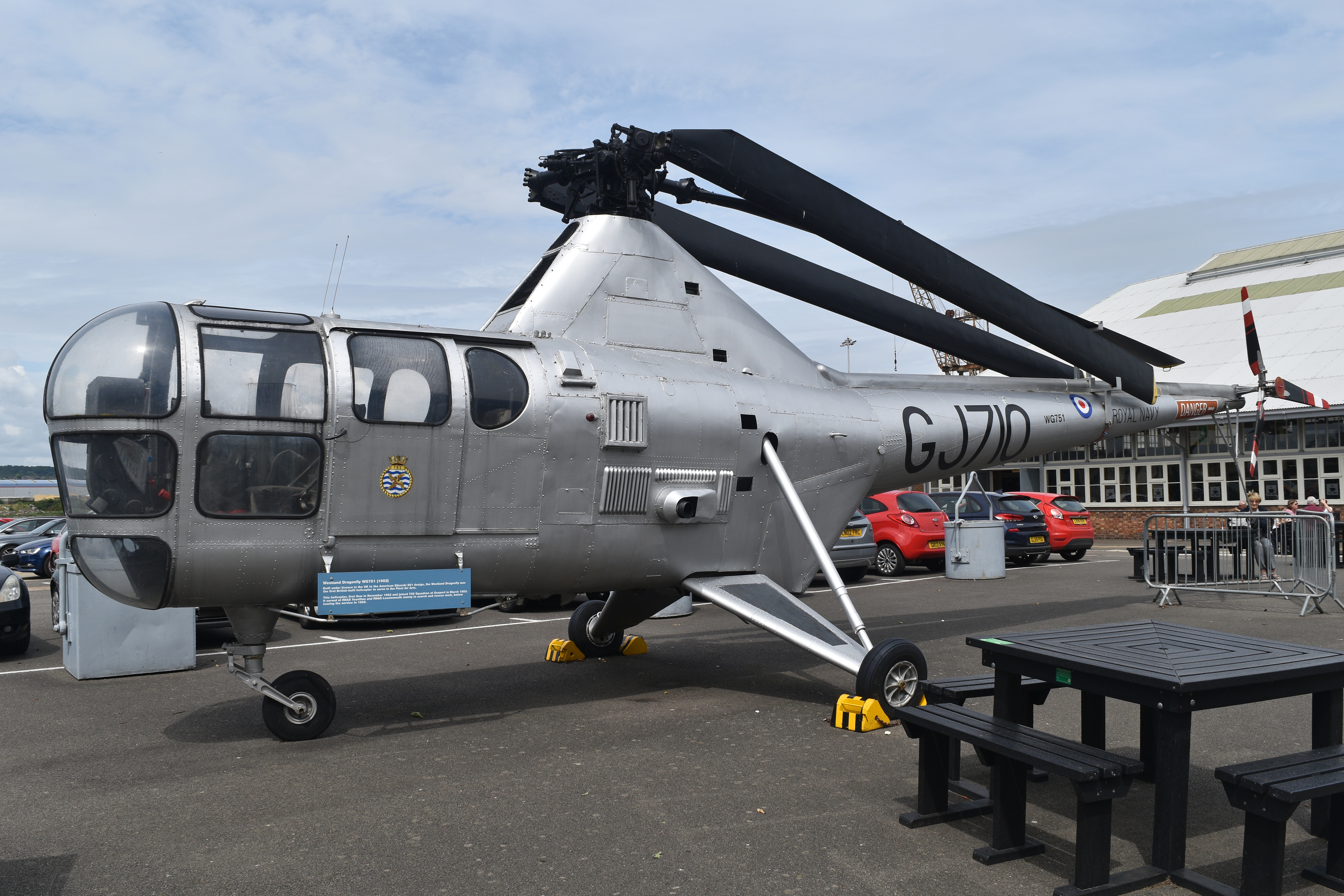
Westland Dragonfly HR.3

- Blackburn Shark II/FP torpedo bomber (July 1936 - June 1937)
- Fairey Swordfish I/FP torpedo bomber (July 1936 - January 1940)
- Fairey Swordfish III torpedo bomber (March - June 1945)
- Sikorsky Hoverfly I light helicopter (May 1947 - November 1950)
- Sikorsky Hoverfly II June light helicopter (1948 - April 1951)
- Westland Dragonfly HR.1 air-sea search and rescue helicopter (January 1950 - March 1953)
- Westland Dragonfly HR.3 air-sea search and rescue helicopter (July 1952 - December 1957)
- Saunders-Roe Skeeter 3 training and scout helicopter (July 1952)
- Sikorsky S-55 utility helicopter (June 1953)
- Hiller HT.1 light observation helicopter (May 1953 - January 1963)
- Westland Whirlwind HAS.22 anti-submarine warfare helicopter (October 1953 - November 1956)
- Westland Whirlwind HAR.1 air-sea search and rescue helicopter (July 1954 - May 1960)
- Westland Whirlwind HAR.3 air-sea search and rescue helicopter (November 1955 - December 1966)
- Westland Dragonfly HAR.5 air-sea search and rescue helicopter (October 1957 - March 1962)
- Westland Whirlwind HAS.7 anti-submarine warfare helicopter (June 1960 - December 1974)
- Hiller HT.2 light observation helicopter (September 1962 - March 1975)
- Westland Gazelle HT.2 training helicopter (March 1974 - October 1997)
- Eurocopter Squirrel HT.1 training helicopter (April 1997 – April 2018)
- Airbus H135 Juno HT.1 light utility helicopter (April 2018–present)

== Commanding officers ==
List of commanding officers of 705 Naval Air Squadron with date of appointment:

1936 - 1940

- Lieutenant Commander D.W. MacKendrick RN (Squadron Leader, RAF), from 15 July 1936
- Lieutenant P.G.O. Sydney-Turner, RN, (Flight Lieutenant, RAF), from 25 May 1937
- Lieutenant P.E. O'Brien, RN, (Flight Lieutenant, RAF), from 14 January 1938
- disbanded - 21 January 1940

1945

- Lieutenant Commander(A) G. Bennett, DSC, RNVR, from 7 March 1945
- disbanded - 24 June 1945

1947 -

- Lieutenant(A) K.M. Reed, RN, from 7 May 1947
- Lieutenant G.N.C. Fuller, RN, from 20 August 1949
- Lieutenant(A) S.H. Suthers, DSC, RN, from 29 November 1949 (Lieutenant Commander 1 March 1950)
- Lieutenant Commander H.R. Spedding, MBE, RN, from 28 October 1952 (Commander 31 December 1953)
- Lieutenant Commander J.C. Jacob, RN, from 24 May 1954
- Lieutenant Commander G.C.J. Knight, DFC, RN, from 29 October 1955
- Lieutenant Commander G.W. Bricker, RN, from 29 November 1957
- Lieutenant Commander R.G.D. Williams, RN, from 6 January 1960
- Lieutenant Commander P.J. Craig, RN, from 21 June 1961
- Lieutenant Commander G.A. Bagnall, RN, from 22 October 1962
- Lieutenant Commander A. Casdagli, RN, from 4 April 1964
- Lieutenant Commander B.C. Sarginson, MBE, RN, from 10 November 1965
- Lieutenant Commander G.W. Barras, RN, from 22 September 1967
- Lieutenant Commander D.K. Hale, RN, from 31 March 1969
- Lieutenant Commander E.C. Ashton-Johnson, RN, from 15 July 1970
- Lieutenant Commander P.B. Rover, RN, from 29 September 1971
- Lieutenant Commander C.J.S. Craig, RN, from 14 May 1973
- Lieutenant Commander T.S. Taylor, RN, from 15 May 1975
- Lieutenant Commander F.A. Rock, RN, from 18 November 1976
- Lieutenant Commander R.J.B. Riley, RN, from 17 August 1978
- Lieutenant Commander W.B. Kirby, RN, from 21 May 1980
- Lieutenant Commander I.T. Lockwood, RN, from 23 April 1982
- Lieutenant Commander S.D. Pendrich, RN, from 16 March 1984
- Lieutenant Commander M.R. Swales, RN, from 25 March 1986 (Commander 30 June 1987)
- Lieutenant Commander M.C. Nixon, RN, from 19 February 1988
- Lieutenant Commander D.G. Hale, RN, from 28 February 1990
- Lieutenant Commander A.J. Egles, AFC, RN, from 18 December 1990
- Lieutenant Commander N.K. Bennett, RN, from 26 February 1993
- Lieutenant Commander M.R. Osman, RN, from 7 November 1994
- Lieutenant Commander B. Frater, RN, from 2013
- Lieutenant Commander S. Hughes, RN, from 26 July 2015
- Lieutenant Commander M. Robinson, RN (July–October 2017)
- Lieutenant Commander P. Ryan (April 2018 – December 2019)
- Lieutenant Commander P. Crompton, RN, from January 2020
- Lieutenant Commander D. Forrest, RN, from 10 March 2022
- Lieutenant Commander R. De Maine, RN, from April 2024
- Lieutenant Commander M. Pickles, RN, from June 2025 – present

Note: Abbreviation (A) signifies Air Branch of the RN or RNVR.

== See also ==
- No. 1 Flying Training School RAF - trains all military helicopter crews for the Royal Air Force, Royal Navy's Fleet Air Arm and the British Army's Army Air Corps.
- History of Royal Navy Helicopter Search and Rescue
- Royal Navy and Fleet Air Arm aerobatic teams
