= Phoenix Five display team =

Aerobatics display team of the Royal Navy

Phoenix Five
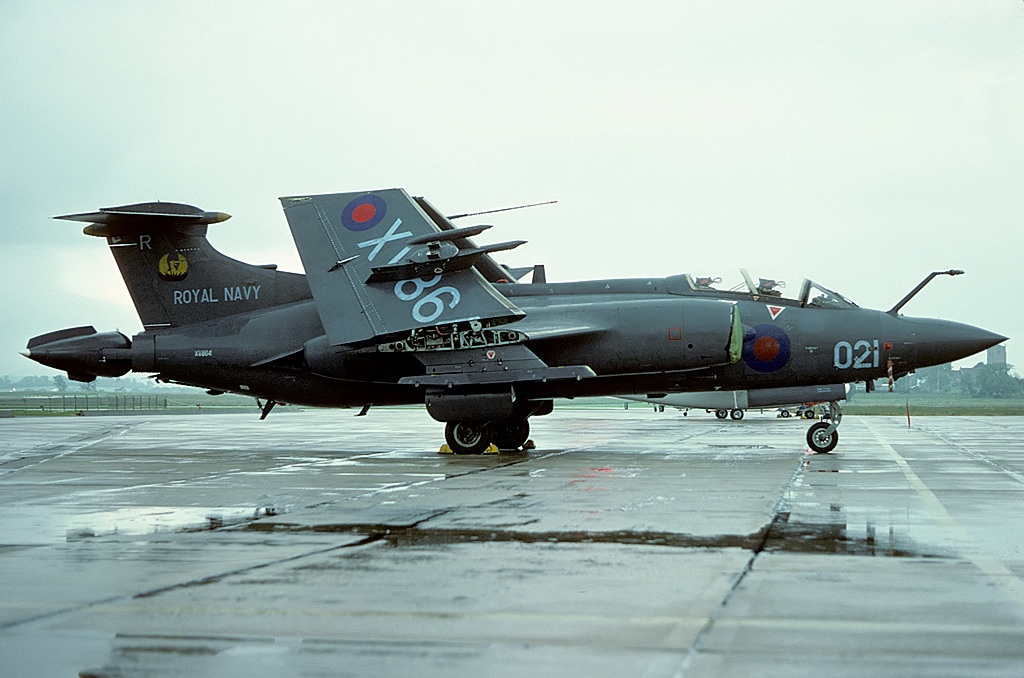
- Blackburn Buccaneer S.2 of 809 Squadron
- Active: 1968
- Country: United Kingdom
- Branch: Royal Navy
- Type: Aerobatic display team
- Role: Public display / formation aerobatics
- Size: Five aircraft
- Aircraft: Blackburn Buccaneer S.2

Phoenix Five was a Royal Navy Fleet Air Arm aerobatic display team formed within 809 Naval Air Squadron in 1968. The team flew Blackburn Buccaneer S.2 aircraft and performed at the 1968 SBAC Farnborough Air Show.

== History ==
In 1968, 809 Naval Air Squadron formed an aerobatic display team known as Phoenix Five. J. Rawlings' history of the Blackburn Buccaneer records that 809 Squadron formed its own aerobatic team, "Phoenix Five", in 1968 and that it performed at that year's SBAC Display.

Contemporary coverage in Air Pictorial documented 809 Squadron Buccaneer S.2s at RNAS Yeovilton during rehearsals for the Farnborough display and subsequently identified the Phoenix Five formation during the event.

Lou Kemp, an observer with 809 Squadron who participated in Phoenix Five, recalled that the team did not perform vertical manoeuvres. He also recalled that the team used a formation manoeuvre known as the twinkle roll, which he said was adapted from the Red Arrows.

== 1968 Farnborough display ==
Phoenix Five's participation in the 1968 SBAC Airshow at Farnborough is documented in contemporary Air Pictorial coverage. The report identified Phoenix Five's Buccaneers and recorded the team's use of the twinkle roll during the display.

The Royal Navy display included Phoenix Five alongside the Sea Vixen display team Simon's Sircus of 892 Naval Air Squadron. Contemporary photographs and captions in Air Pictorial documented the Buccaneers and Sea Vixens operating together as part of the Royal Navy's Farnborough display.

Kemp later recalled that Phoenix Five participated in the combined Navy display with the Sea Vixens of Simon's Sircus at Farnborough in 1968. His account describes the formation flying and the team's twinkle roll.

A 2017 account of the 1968 SBAC Airshow states that the Royal Navy's set-piece included six de Havilland Sea Vixens from Simon's Sircus of 892 NAS and five Blackburn Buccaneers from 809 NAS's Phoenix Five team.

A contemporary photograph caption in Air Pictorial described the formation as "Phoenix Five (plus one)".

== Personnel ==
A later collection of Fleet Air Arm recollections includes a photograph caption identifying ten people in connection with the 809 Squadron Phoenix Five team: Dave Thompson, Robin Cox, Arthur White, Pete Sturt, Pete King, Dave Eagles, Pete Matthews, Paddy Micklejohn, Dave Bedoe and Mike Cunningham.

The source identifies the individuals in connection with Phoenix Five but does not establish that all ten were display pilots.

Robin Cox later recalled participating in the Phoenix Five aerobatic team during the 1968 Farnborough Air Display and stated that 809 Squadron coordinated its display with 892 Naval Air Squadron.

== See also ==
- 809 Naval Air Squadron
- Fleet Air Arm
- Blackburn Buccaneer
- Simon's Sircus
- Royal Navy
- Royal Navy and Fleet Air Arm aerobatic teams
