= Diamonds in the Rough =

Diamonds in the Rough or Diamond in the Rough may refer to:

== Music ==
- "Diamonds in the Rough", a song by the Carter Family from the album The Original and Great Carter Family
- Diamonds in the Rough (album), a 1972 album by John Prine
- Diamond in the Rough, a 1974 album by Syl Johnson
- Diamond in the Rough (Jessi Colter album), 1976, or the title song
- Diamond in the Rough (Roy Hargrove album), 1990
- "Diamond in the Rough", a song by Shawn Colvin from the 1989 album Steady On
- "Diamond in the Rough", a song by Airbourne from the 2007 album Runnin' Wild
- "Diamond in the Rough", a song by Social Distortion from the 2011 album Hard Times and Nursery Rhymes
- "Diamond in the Rough", a song by Alan Menken & Chad Beguelin, from the 2011 musical adaptation of Disney's Aladdin
- Live in the LBC & Diamonds in the Rough, a 2008 album of unreleased songs by Avenged Sevenfold

== Other uses ==
- Diamond in the Rough (manga), a manga series
- Diamond in the Rough (Modern Family), a 2012 episode of the television series Modern Family
- Diamonds in the Rough (professional wrestling), a professional wrestling stable

== See also ==
- Rough Diamond (disambiguation)
