= 766 Naval Air Squadron =

Inactive flying squadron of the Royal Navy's Fleet Air Arm

- Squadron badge
- Active: 1942–1954; 1955–1970
- Disbanded: 10 December 1970
- Country: United Kingdom
- Branch: Royal Navy
- Type: Fleet Air Arm Second Line Squadron
- Role: Night Torpedo Course; Operational Training Unit; Operational Flying School; All Weather Fighter Pool; Naval All Weather Fighter School; All Weather Fighter Training Squadron
- Size: Squadron
- Part of: Fleet Air Arm
- Home station: See Naval air stations section for full list.
- Mottos: Festina lente (Latin for 'Hasten slowly')
- Aircraft: See Aircraft operated section for full list.

Insignia
- Squadron Badge Description: Blue, in base two bars wavy white a torch gold winged white inflamed proper (1949)
- Identification Markings: K1A+ to K3A+ Swordfish; K1A+, K2A+ & K5A+ Firefly; K1A+ Sea Hurricane; I1A+, I2A+, I3A+ I6A+ & I7A+ (all types 1946); 100-140 (Seafire), 200-268 (Firefly), 231-248 (Harvard), 270-275 (Sea Fury), 400-402 (Anson), (from 1946-1953); 200-255 (Firefly 1953-1954); 200-207 (Sea Venom 1955); 700-740 (all types 1956-1970)
- Fin Shore Codes: LM (1946 - 1953); CU Firefly (1953 - 1954); VL Sea Venom (1955); VL (1956 - 1970)

766 Naval Air Squadron (766 NAS) was a Fleet Air Arm (FAA) naval air squadron of the United Kingdom's Royal Navy (RN). It was to have initially formed in 1939 at HMS Daedalus, RNAS Lee-on-Solent, as a Seaplane School, however, it formed at HMS Landrail, RNAS Machrihannish, as a Night ALT (Attack Light Torpedo) Course, in 1942. It moved to HMS Nightjar, RNAS Inskip, in 1943, to become part of No. 1 Naval Operational Training Unit. By 1944, it was operating over 30 Swordfish aircraft, but, during the year, also acquired Firefly aircraft from 1772 NAS, and Sea Hurricane aircraft from 760 NAS. It moved to HMS Merganser, RNAS Rattray, early in 1946, but later that year, moved to HMS Fulmar, RNAS Lossiemouth, where it received Seafire aircraft, along with being Part 1 of the Operational Flying School. By late 1951, Sea Fury trainer aircraft were also added to its varied list of types operated. In 1953, the squadron moved to HMS Seahawk, RNAS Culdrose, where it disbanded in 1954.

In 1955, it reformed at HMS Heron, RNAS Yeovilton, with Sea Venom aircraft from 890 NAS, to form an All Weather Fighter Pool. Yeovilton's runways were undergoing reconstruction in 1956, so the squadron relocated to RNAS Merryfield, which was a satellite station of Yeovilton. In October 1957, the squadron became the Naval All Weather Fighter School, a task previously performed by 238 Operational Conversion Unit, at RAF North Luffenham. The title changed to All Weather Fighter Training Squadron, in 1958, when it returned to Yeovilton. When the initial Sea Vixen aircraft arrived, they were designated as 766B NAS, until the remaining Sea Venom were finally withdrawn, in October 1960. Sea Vixen FAW.2 aircraft were added to the initial FAW.1 aircraft, in 1965. The squadron disbanded at Yeovilton, in December 1970, when its task ended and its aircraft were transferred to 890 NAS.

Aircraft had the code VL on tail and a 3-digit number assigned to each aircraft. VL-###

== History ==
=== Night Torpedo Course (1942–1943) ===
766 Naval Air Squadron formed, on 15 April 1942, at RNAS Machrihanish (HMS Landrail), situated close to Campbeltown, on the Kintyre peninsula, in Argyll and Bute, Scotland, as a Night Torpedo Course. The squadron was initially equipped with two types of biplane torpedo bomber aircraft, Fairey Swordfish and Fairey Albacore, for this role. The course the squadron delivered was the Night ALT (Attack Light Torpedo) Course. In the August it added Fairey Fulmar, a British carrier-borne reconnaissance/fighter aircraft, to its inventory.

=== Operational Training Unit (1943–1946) ===
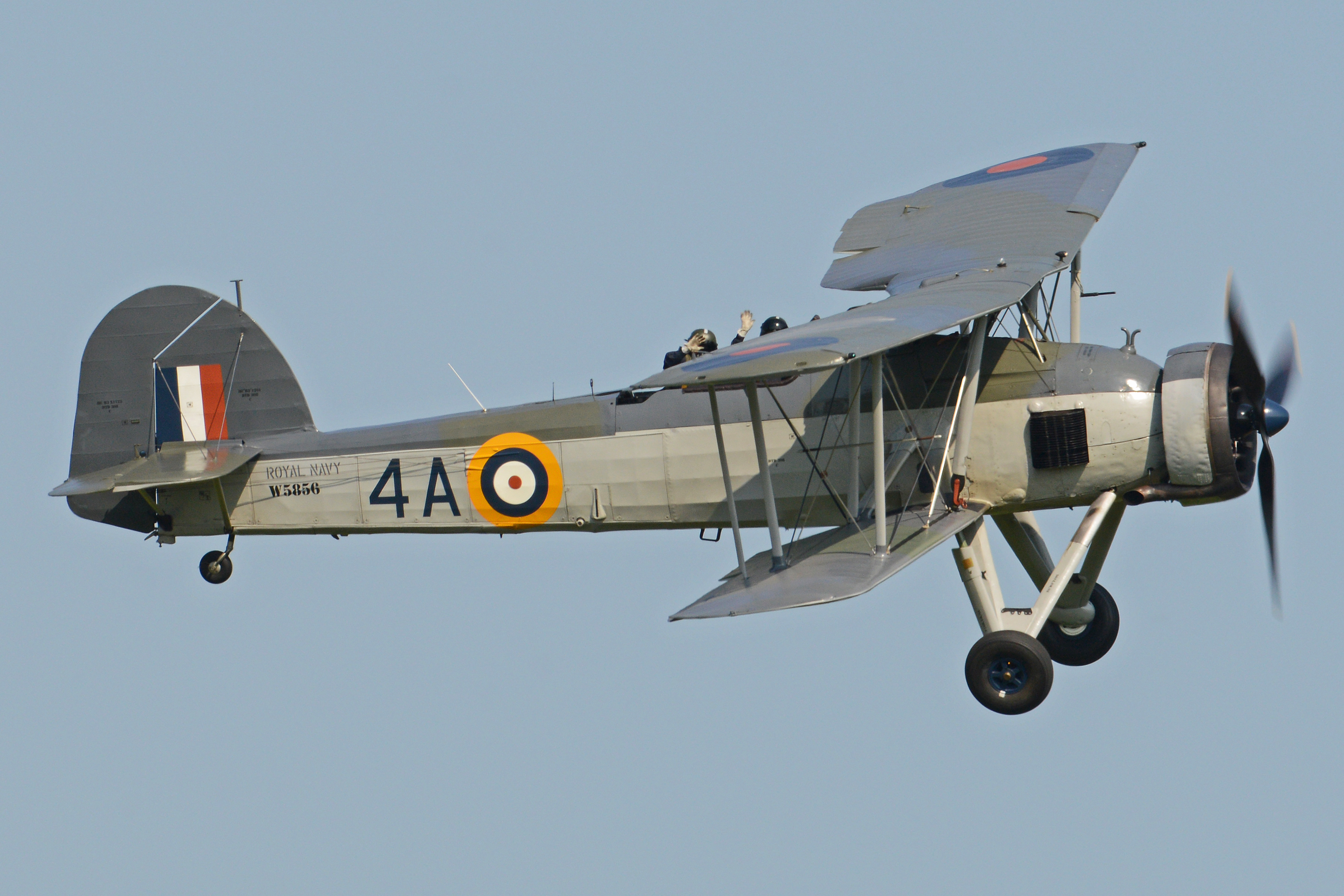
Fairey Swordfish I 'W5856-4A, an example of the type used by 766 NAS

Around fifteen months after forming, 766 Naval Air Squadron moved to RNAS Inskip (HMS Nightjar), near Inskip, a small village in the Fylde area of Lancashire, England, to become part of No.1 Naval Operational Training Unit on 7 July 1943. By October of that year, the Fairey Albacore aircraft were withdrawn from squadron use, however, in January 1944, the squadron received Avro Anson, a multirole aircraft to work alongside the Fairey Swordfish and Fairey Fulmar, and by the middle of the year, it had thirty-one Fairey Swordfish on strength, which included three that were used by a Photographic Flight.

In the autumn of 1944, there were significant changes to the squadron's aircraft inventory. September 1944 saw the withdrawal of the Fairey Fulmar aircraft, and during October, Fairey Firefly aircraft arrived, a British fighter and anti-submarine aircraft, with the initial use of fourteen aircraft that had been given up by 1772 Naval Air Squadron. At the same time, the Fairey Albacore torpedo bombers were withdrawn. November bought the arrival of Hawker Sea Hurricane, a navalised version of the Hawker Hurricane fighter aircraft, from the disbanding 760 Naval Air Squadron, at RNAS Inskip. 766 Naval Air Squadron remained at RNAS Inskip for roughly another twelve months, then moved to RNAS Rattray (HMS Merganser), located near Crimond in Aberdeenshire, Scotland, on 20 January 1946.

=== Operational Flying School (1946–1954) ===
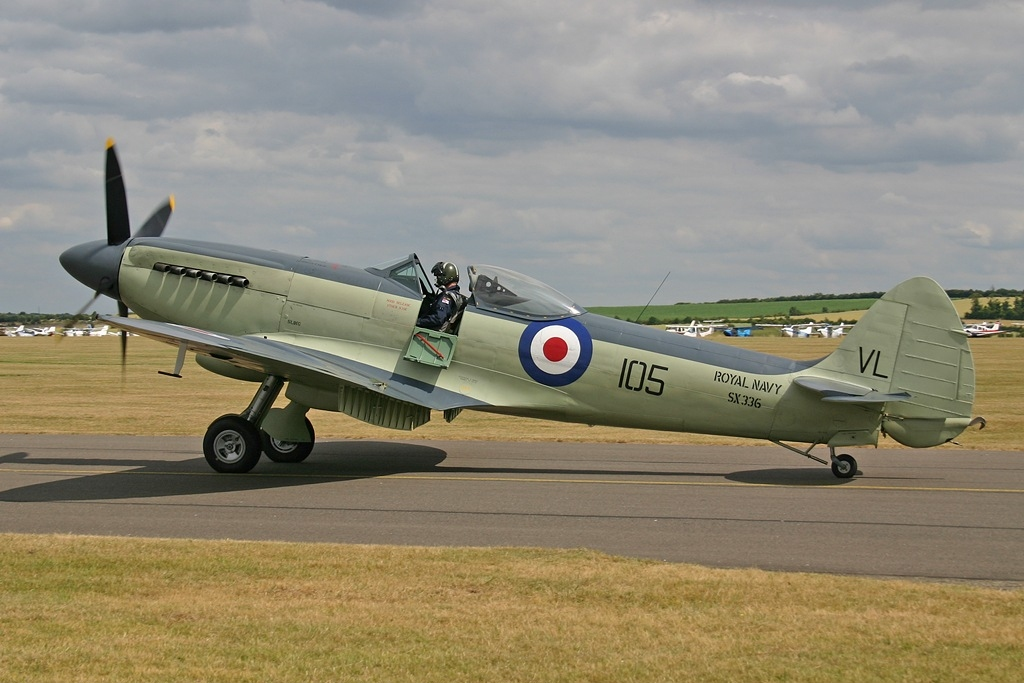
Supermarine Seafire F Mk XVII of the type used by 766 NAS

It operated out of RNAS Rattray for seven months before relocating again, on the 4 August 1946, with the squadron moving to RNAS Lossiemouth (HMS Fulmar), located by the town of Lossiemouth in Moray, north-east Scotland and becoming Part I of the Operational Flying School course. Here the squadron was equipped with Supermarine Seafire, a navalised version of the Supermarine Spitfire fighter aircraft from August, to operate alongside its existing Fairey Firefly aircraft. Around the middle of 1947, later variants of the Supermarine Seafire arrived and by September, the earlier versions had been withdrawn.

Supermarine Seafire and Fairey Firefly continued as the squadron's main aircraft for the next few years, however, in late 1951 Hawker Sea Fury, a British naval fighter bomber aircraft, arrived and within a few months, by the November, the Supermarine Seafire aircraft were withdrawn. In July 1952, the squadron gave up its Hawker Sea Fury aircraft and the main focus was on the Fairey Firefly. The following year, after around seven years at RNAS Lossiemouth, on the 3 October 1953, 766 Naval Air Squadron moved to RNAS Culdrose (HMS Seahawk), near Helston on the Lizard Peninsula of Cornwall, England, however, just over one year later, the squadron disbanded on the 25 November 1954.

=== All Weather Fighter Pool (1955–1957) ===
766 Naval Air Squadron reformed, from 890 Naval Air Squadron, at RNAS Yeovilton (HMS Heron), sited a few miles north of Yeovil, in Somerset, England, as an All Weather Fighter Pool, on the 18 October 1955. The squadron was initially equipped with eight de Havilland Sea Venom, a carrier-capable jet fighter-bomber aircraft, which were of the initial production type, the FAW.20 (Fighter, All-Weather). In January 1956, the de Havilland Sea Venom were complimented with de Havilland Sea Vampire two-seat trainer aircraft, however, by August both of these types were withdrawn and the squadron received a replacement with a later improved variation of the de Havilland Sea Venom FAW.21. During 1956 it was decided that the runways at HMS Heron needed reconstructing, therefore, to accommodate the work and continue operating, on 24 November 1956, 766 Naval Air Squadron moved to RNAS Merryfield, situated some 8.1 miles (13 kilometres) south-east of Taunton, in Somerset, England.

=== All Weather Fighter Training Squadron (1957–1970) ===
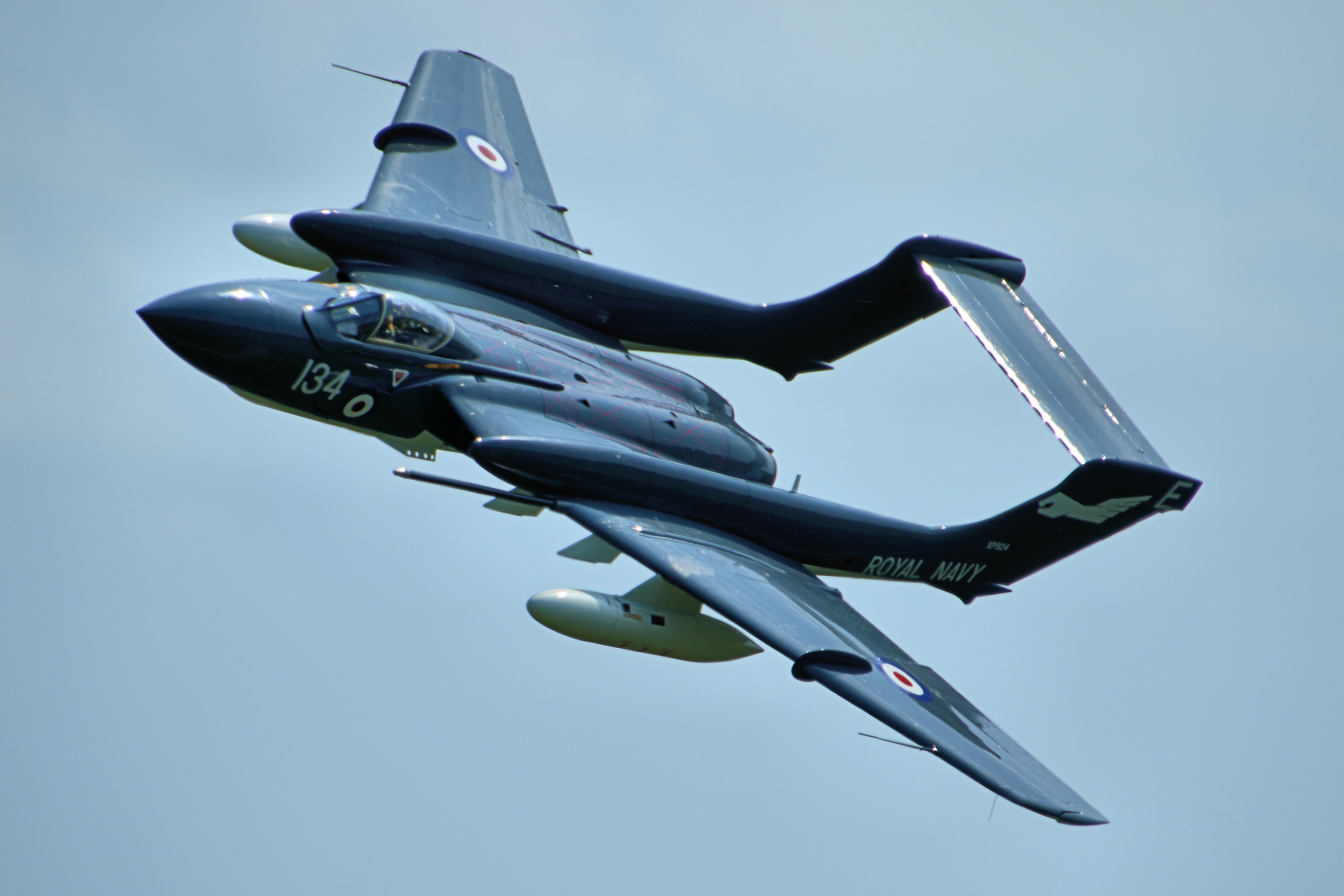
Sea Vixen, an example of the FAW.2 used by 766 NAS

At RNAS Merryfield in October 1957, 766 Naval Air Squadron became the Naval All Weather Fighter School. It took over the duties previously undertaken by No.238 Operational Conversion Unit at RAF North Luffenham, Rutland, in training naval pilots and observers for all weather operations. On 20 January 1958, the squadron returned to RNAS Yeovilton (HMS Heron).

May 1959, saw 766 Naval Air Squadron become the All Weather Fighter Training Squadron, still operating its de Havilland Sea Venom FAW.21. In October 1959, de Havilland Sea Vixen, a carrier-based fleet air-defence fighter aircraft arrived, with a number of FAW.1 aircraft, however, these were designated 766B Naval Air Squadron. In May 1960 Hawker Hunter T.8 aircraft arrived, a two-seat jet trainer for the Royal Navy, fitted with an arrestor hook for use on RN airfields, then, in October, the de Havilland Sea Venom were withdrawn and the de Havilland Sea Vixen became part of 766 Naval Air Squadron, with 766B disbanding on the 24 October 1960.

A Fleet Air Arm aerobatic display team of the Royal Navy, known as Fred's Five and led by Lieutenant Commander P.B. Reynolds, RN, was established by the Naval Fighter School at RNAS Yeovilton in 1962. The team utilised de Havilland Sea Vixen FAW.1 aircraft from 766 Squadron and participated in British air displays throughout the early 1960s.

In October 1962, the Hawker Hunter aircraft were withdrawn from squadron use, leaving 766 Naval Air Squadron solely with the de Havilland Sea Vixen aircraft. July 1965 saw the arrival of an improved variant of the FAW.1, the de Havilland Sea Vixen FAW.2 aircraft. Over the next three years FAW.1 aircraft were slowly withdrawn, with the last leaving 766 Naval Air Squadron in May 1968. The squadron continued with FAW.2 for the next couple of years, however, on the 10 December 1970, 766 Naval Air Squadron disbanded at RNAS Yeovilton (HMS Heron), its task and aircraft going to 890 Naval Air Squadron.

== Aircraft operated ==
766 Naval Air Squadron has operated a number of different aircraft types, including:

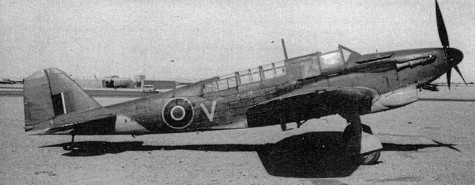
Fairey Fulmar Mk.II

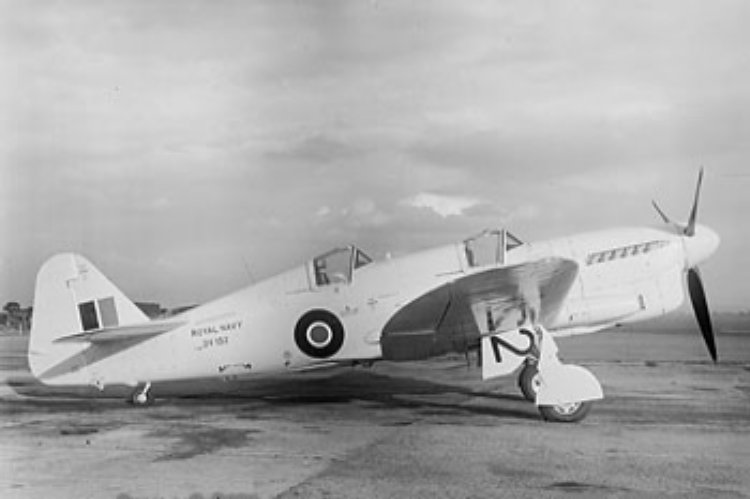
Fairey Firefly T1 Trainer, of the type used by 766 NAS

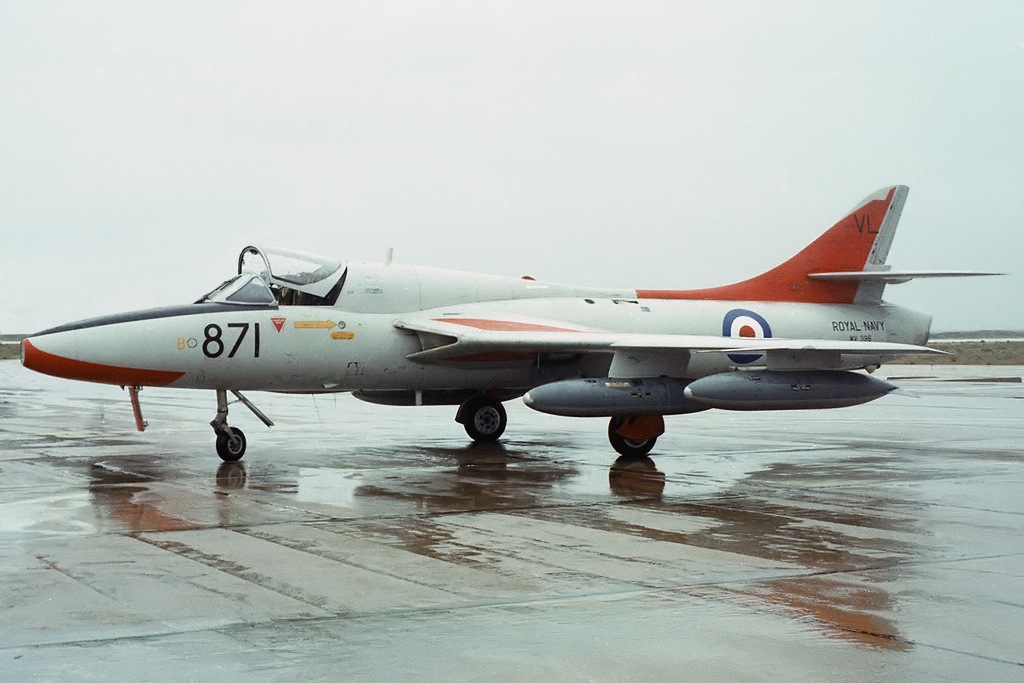
Hawker Hunter T.8

- Fairey Swordfish I torpedo bomber (April 1942 – November 1944)
- Fairey Albacore torpedo bomber (April 1942 – October 1943)
- Fairey Fulmar Mk.I reconnaissance/fighter aircraft (August 1942 – September 1944)
- Fairey Fulmar Mk.II reconnaissance/fighter aircraft (August 1942 – September 1944)
- Fairey Swordfish II torpedo bomber (April 1943 – November 1944)
- Avro Anson I multi-role trainer aircraft (January 1944 – March 1949)
- Fairey Swordfish III torpedo bomber (March 1944 – November 1944)
- Fairey Firefly FR.I fighter and reconnaissance aircraft (October 1944 – November 1954)
- Hawker Sea Hurricane Mk IIC fighter aircraft (November 1944 – March 1945)
- Miles Martinet TT.Mk I target tug (1945 – June 1946)
- Miles Master GT.II advanced trainer (October 1945)
- Airspeed Oxford trainer aircraft (December 1945 – June 1947)
- North American Harvard III advanced trainer (February 1946 – November 1949)
- Supermarine Seafire F Mk III fighter aircraft (August 1946 – September 1947)
- North American Harvard T.T. IIB advanced trainer (January 1947)
- Supermarine Seafire F Mk XVII fighter aircraft (June 1947 – November 1951)
- Fairey Firefly T.Mk 1 trainer aircraft (January 1948 – November 1954)
- Fairey Firefly T.Mk 2 armed trainer aircraft (September 1951 – November 1954)
- Hawker Sea Fury T.20 fighter-bomber trainer (September 1951 – July 1952)
- de Havilland Sea Venom FAW.20 jet fighter-bomber (October 1955 – August 1956)
- de Havilland Sea Vampire T.22 jet trainer aircraft (January 1956 – July 1956)
- de Havilland Sea Venom FAW.21 jet fighter-bomber (August 1956 – October 1960)
- de Havilland Sea Vixen FAW.1 jet fighter aircraft (October 1959 – May 1968)
- Hawker Hunter T.8 jet trainer aircraft (May 1960 – September 1962)
- de Havilland Sea Vixen FAW.2 jet fighter aircraft (July 1965 – December 1970)

== Naval air stations ==
766 Naval Air Squadron operated from a number of naval air stations of the Royal Navy, in Scotland and England:

1942 - 1954

- Royal Naval Air Station Machrihanish (HMS Landrail), Argyll and Bute, (15 April 1942 – 7 July 1943)
  - satellite - Royal Naval Air Station Campbelton (HMS Landrail II), Argyll
- Royal Naval Air Station Inskip (HMS Nightjar), Lancashire, (7 July 1943 – 20 January 1946)
- Royal Naval Air Station Rattray (HMS Merganser), Aberdeenshire, (20 January 1946 – 4 August 1946)
- Royal Naval Air Station Lossiemouth (HMS Fulmar), Moray, (4 August 1946 – 3 October 1953)
  - satellite - Royal Naval Air Station Milltown (HMS Fulmar II), Moray
- Royal Naval Air Station Culdrose (HMS Seahawk), Cornwall, (3 October 1953 – 25 November 1954)
- disbanded - (25 November 1954)

1955 - 1970

- Royal Naval Air Station Yeovilton (HMS Heron), Somerset, (18 October 1955 – 24 November 1956)
- Royal Naval Air Station Merryfield, Somerset, (24 November 1956 – 20 January 1958)
- Royal Naval Air Station Yeovilton (HMS Heron), Somerset, (20 January 1958 – 31 May 1967)
  - HMS Eagle (Detachment four aircraft 30 September - 15 October 1964)
- Royal Naval Air Station Brawdy (HMS Goldcrest), Pembrokeshire, (31 May 1967 - 23 August 1967)
- Royal Naval Air Station Yeovilton (HMS Heron), Somerset, (23 August 1967 – 10 December 1970)
- disbanded - (10 December 1970)

=== 776B Squadron ===
- Royal Naval Air Station Yeovilton (HMS Heron), Somerset, (22 October 1959 - 24 October 1960)
- became 766 Naval Air Squadron (24 October 1960)

== Commanding officers ==
List of commanding officers of 766 Naval Air Squadron with date of appointment:

1942 - 1954

- Lieutenant Commander(A) R.E. Bibby, DSO, RNVR, from 15 April 1942
- Lieutenant Commander W.F.C. Garthwaite, DSC, RNVR, from 24 July 1943
- Lieutenant Commander E.B. Morgan, RANVR, from 3 August 1944
- Major V.B.G. Cheesman, DSO, MBE, DSC, RM, from 20 January 1946
- Lieutenant Commander T.W. Harrington, DSC & Bar, RN, from 1 December 1947
- Lieutenant Commander A.W. Bloomer, RN, from 30 March 1949
- Lieutenant Commander J.M. Henry, RN, from 21 January 1951
- Lieutenant Commander D.W. Winterton, RN, from 2 December 1952
- Lieutenant Commander P. Carmichael, RN, from 30 October 1953
- Lieutenant Commander E.F. Pritchard, RN, from 10 February 1954
- disbanded - 25 November 1954

1955 - 1970

- Lieutenant Commander L. Jeyes, RN, from 18 October 1955
- Lieutenant Commander P.J. Young, RN, from 4 January 1956
- Lieutenant Commander I. McKenzie, RN, from 6 February 1956
- Lieutenant Commander G.R.J. Elgar, RN, from 16 April 1956
- Lieutenant Commander W.A.M. Ferguson, DSO, RN, from 11 March 1957 (KiFA 1 May 1958)
- Lieutenant Commander K. Sinclair, RN, from 1 May 1958
- Lieutenant Commander J.F. Blunden, RN, from 29 September 1959
- Lieutenant Commander W.J. Carter, RN, from 12 January 1960
- Lieutenant J.N.S. Anderdon, RN, from 16 May 1960
- Lieutenant Commander K. Sinclair, RN, from 24 October 1960
- Lieutenant Commander P.B. Reynolds, RN, from 25 April 1961
- Lieutenant Commander G.P. Carne, RN, from 5 February 1963
- Lieutenant Commander K.E. Kemp, RN, from 24 August 1964, (Commander 31 December 1964)
- Lieutenant Commander B.G. Young, RN, from 11 November 1965
- Lieutenant Commander G.W.G. Hunt, RN, from 14 October 1966
- Lieutenant Commander D.J. Dunbar-Dempsey, RN, from 17 May 1968
- Lieutenant Commander G.L. Shaw, RN, from 22 July 1969
- disbanded - 10 December 1970

=== 766B Naval Air Squadron (1959 – 1960) ===
Commanding officer of B Flight, 766 Naval Air Squadron, with date of appointment:

- Lieutenant Commander K. Sinclair, RN, from October 1959
- disbanded - 24 October 1960

Note: Abbreviation (A) signifies Air Branch of the RN or RNVR.

== See also ==
- Royal Navy and Fleet Air Arm aerobatic teams
