= Royal Navy and Fleet Air Arm aerobatic teams =

Aerobatic and display teams of the Royal Navy's Fleet Air Arm

Royal Navy and Fleet Air Arm aerobatic teams were flying display formations operated by, or associated with, the Royal Navy's Fleet Air Arm. From 1948, Fleet Air Arm squadrons periodically formed named aerobatic teams for public air displays. Other squadrons also performed organised formation or solo displays without evidence of a separately named team. The tradition initially involved fixed-wing aircraft, including the de Havilland Sea Hornet, Hawker Sea Hawk, Supermarine Scimitar, de Havilland Sea Vixen, Hawker Hunter and Blackburn Buccaneer, before becoming predominantly helicopter-based from the 1970s.

== History ==
=== 1948: 806 Naval Air Squadron ===
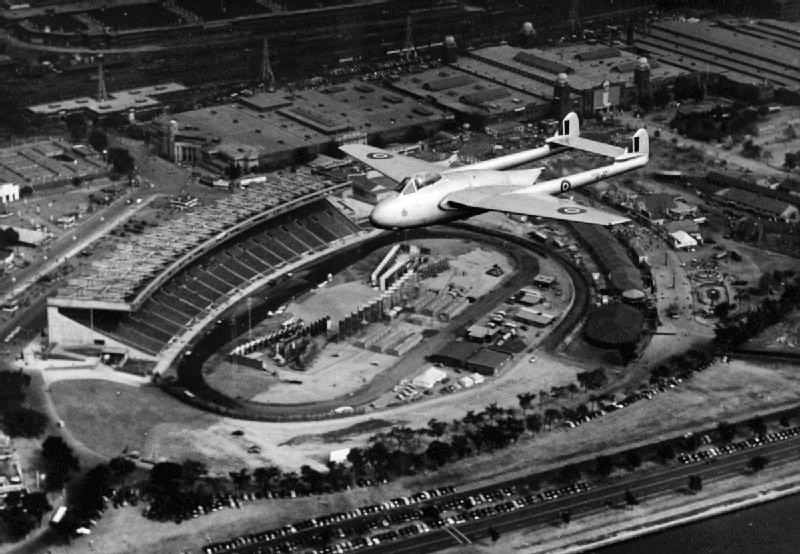
de Havilland Sea Vampire F.20 of 806 Naval Air Squadron in flight over the Exhibition Stadium, Toronto, Canada

In May 1948, 806 Naval Air Squadron was re-formed as the official Royal Navy Aerobatic Team for a tour of North America. The team comprised three de Havilland Sea Hornet F.20s, a de Havilland Sea Vampire and two Hawker Sea Furys. The aircraft were embarked in the Canadian aircraft carrier HMCS Magnificent for the tour, which included displays at Dorval, Montreal, Toronto, Ottawa, Niagara Falls and New York.

The team participated in the opening ceremony of Idlewild Airport in New York, with the Sea Vampire flown by the squadron's commanding officer, Lieutenant Commander D.B. Law.

=== 1957–1961: Sea Hawk and Scimitar formations ===
In 1957, 738 Naval Air Squadron formed a five-aircraft Hawker Sea Hawk aerobatic formation for the Farnborough Airshow. The aircraft were painted red and equipped to produce coloured smoke. The formation has been identified as the Red Devils, while a Fleet Air Arm Association account calls the formation the Red Seahawks; the contemporary naming evidence is therefore treated with some caution.

In 1958, 800 Naval Air Squadron formed a seven-aircraft Sea Hawk display formation for the Farnborough Airshow. The aircraft were equipped with smoke systems and the formation was disbanded after the display season. No sufficiently reliable evidence has been established for a separate enduring name for the formation.

In 1959, 807 Naval Air Squadron performed formation aerobatics at the Farnborough Airshow using Supermarine Scimitar aircraft. The Imperial War Museums catalogue for the contemporary film of the event specifically records formation aerobatics by Scimitars of 807 Squadron, Fleet Air Arm.

During the summer of 1961, 800 Naval Air Squadron was designated the Royal Naval Aerobatic Team '61. The squadron operated Scimitar aircraft and performed displays at the 24th Salon de l'Aéronautique in Paris, four Royal Naval Air Station air days, a Navy Day and the SBAC Farnborough Air Show.

=== 1962–1968: Fleet Air Arm fast-jet display teams ===
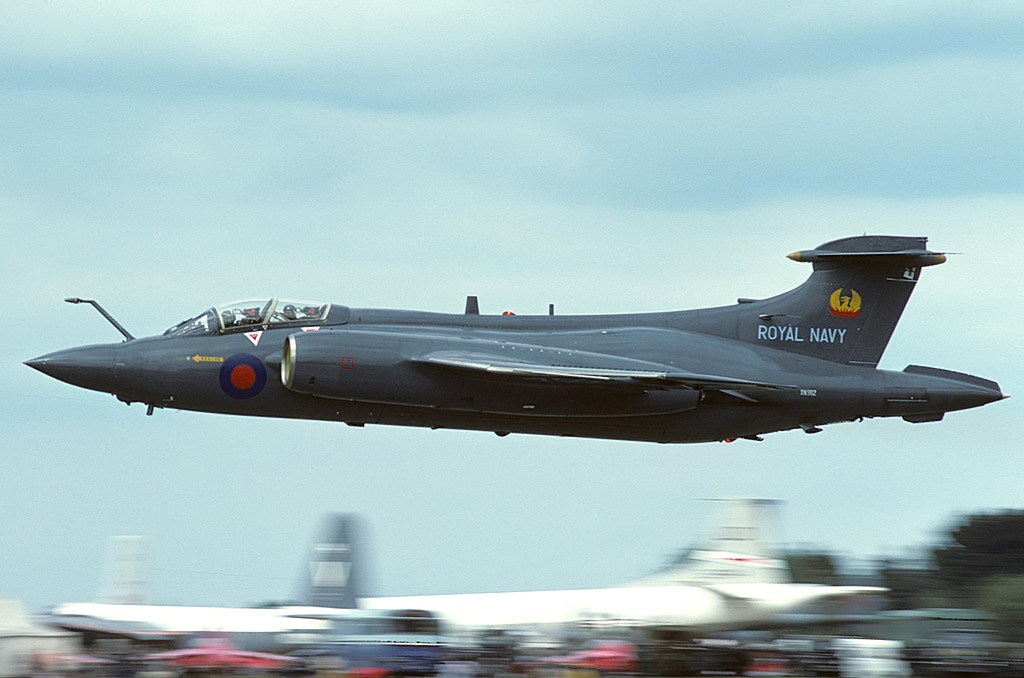
Blackburn Buccaneer S2A, 809 Squadron

In 1962, 766 Naval Air Squadron formed Fred's Five, a five-aircraft display formation flying de Havilland Sea Vixen FAW.1 aircraft. The team was led by Lieutenant Commander Peter Reynolds, whose nickname was "Fred".

In 1965, 738 Naval Air Squadron formed Rough Diamonds at RNAS Brawdy. The team comprised three Hawker Hunter GA.11 aircraft and a Hunter T.8 trainer and was led by Lieutenant Commander Christopher Comins. The aircraft retained the standard Fleet Air Arm colour scheme, with the leader's aircraft carrying distinctive dayglo-red markings. The team operated from 1965 until 1969.

In 1968, 809 Naval Air Squadron formed Phoenix Five, a display formation flying Blackburn Buccaneer aircraft. Contemporary coverage in Air Pictorial explicitly identified the formation as "Phoenix Five".

In the same year, 892 Naval Air Squadron formed Simon's Sircus, a display formation of de Havilland Sea Vixen aircraft. Contemporary Air Pictorial coverage identified the formation by name and showed Simon's Sircus performing a smoking loop at Farnborough alongside Phoenix Five.

=== 1970–1975: display flying and the transition to helicopters ===
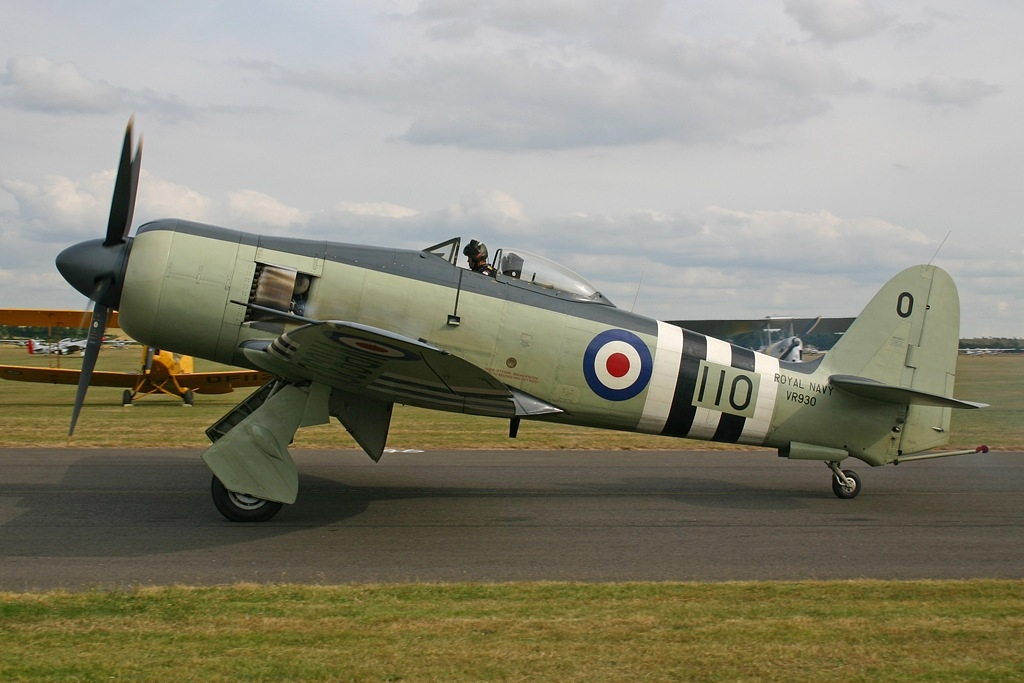
Hawker Sea Fury Royal Navy Historic Flight

Following the end of the Rough Diamonds in 1969, Fleet Air Arm display flying continued, but no separately named Royal Navy aerobatic team has been established from the available evidence for the period 1970–1974.

Sea Vixen aircraft continued to appear in individual display flying during the period. The surviving Sea Vixen display record, for example, records a solo aerobatic display at the 1970 Yeovilton Air Day.

The Royal Navy Historic Flight was established at RNAS Yeovilton in 1972 to preserve and operate historic Fleet Air Arm aircraft at public displays. It was a historic aircraft organisation rather than an aerobatic team.

The Westland Gazelle entered Royal Navy service with 705 Naval Air Squadron in late 1974. Five Royal Navy Gazelles were present at the Fleet Air Arm Diamond Jubilee air display at RNAS Culdrose in July 1974, providing an early indication of the type's subsequent role in naval public displays.

=== 1975–1996: Blue Herons and the Sharks ===
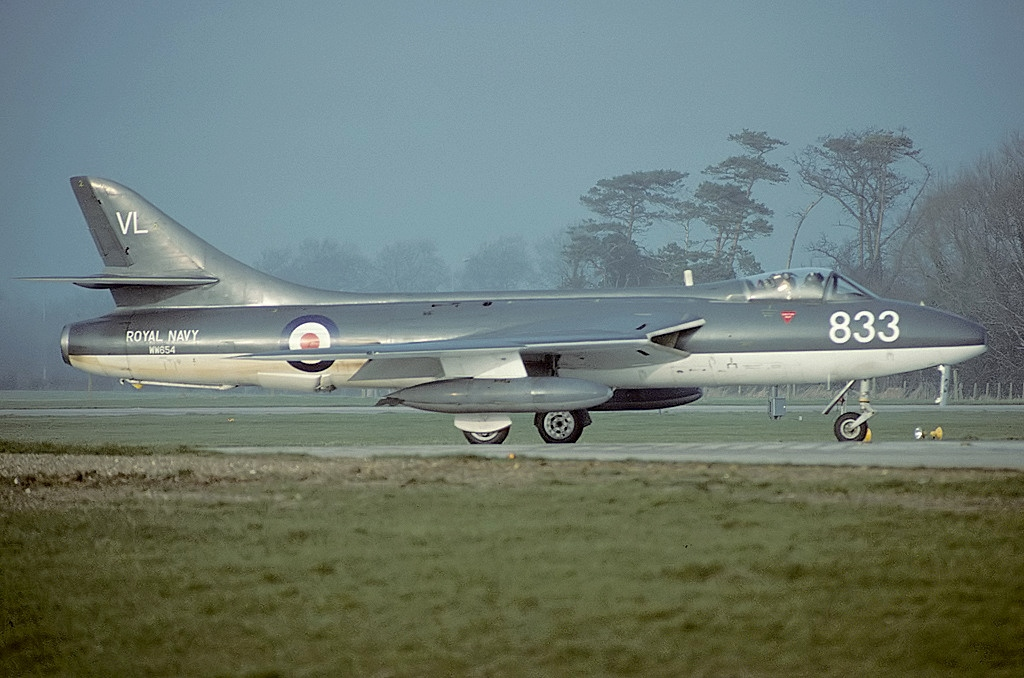
Hawker Hunter GA11; used by the Blue Herons

In 1975, the Fleet Requirements and Air Direction Unit (FRADU) formed Blue Herons, a four-aircraft Hawker Hunter display team. The team was formed by pilots serving with FRADU and performed at air displays during the second half of the 1970s. It was withdrawn during the winter of 1980.

The Blue Herons won trophies at the International Air Tattoo in 1976 and 1977. The team was subsequently re-formed for individual displays, including at RNAS Yeovilton and RNAS Culdrose in 1986.

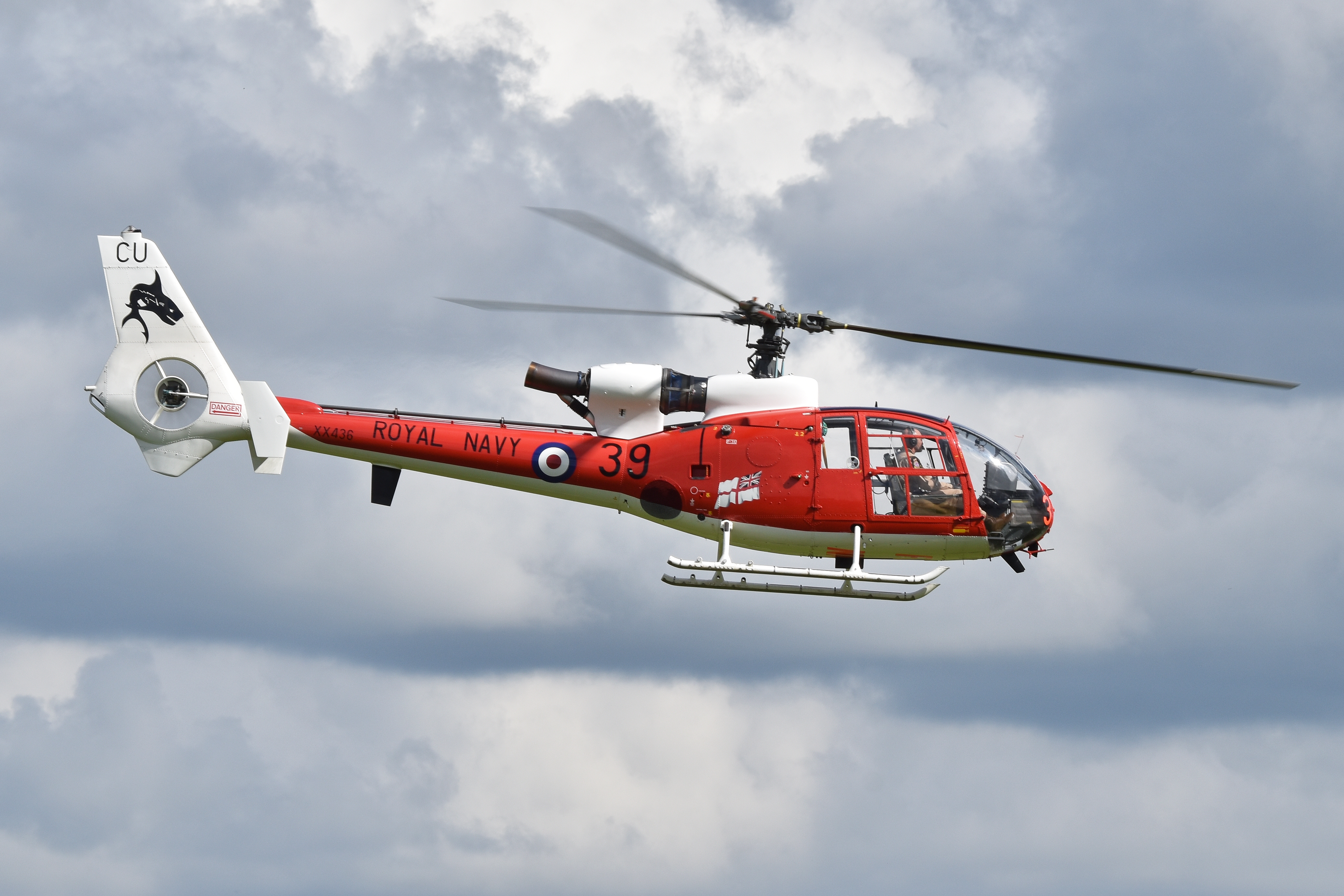
Westland Gazelle HT.2, 705 Squadron - Sharks

In 1975, 705 Naval Air Squadron formed the Sharks, a Royal Navy helicopter formation display team flying Aérospatiale Gazelle helicopters. The inaugural team used a six-aircraft routine and was composed of squadron instructors and exchange personnel. The name "Sharks" was attributed to a member of the inaugural team who considered the Gazelle's tail to resemble a shark.

The Sharks flew in the United Kingdom and Europe during the summer air-show seasons from 1975 until 1996, when the Royal Navy withdrew the Gazelle from service. The team was therefore the principal Royal Navy helicopter display formation for more than two decades.

=== 2001–present: Lynx Pair and Black Cats ===
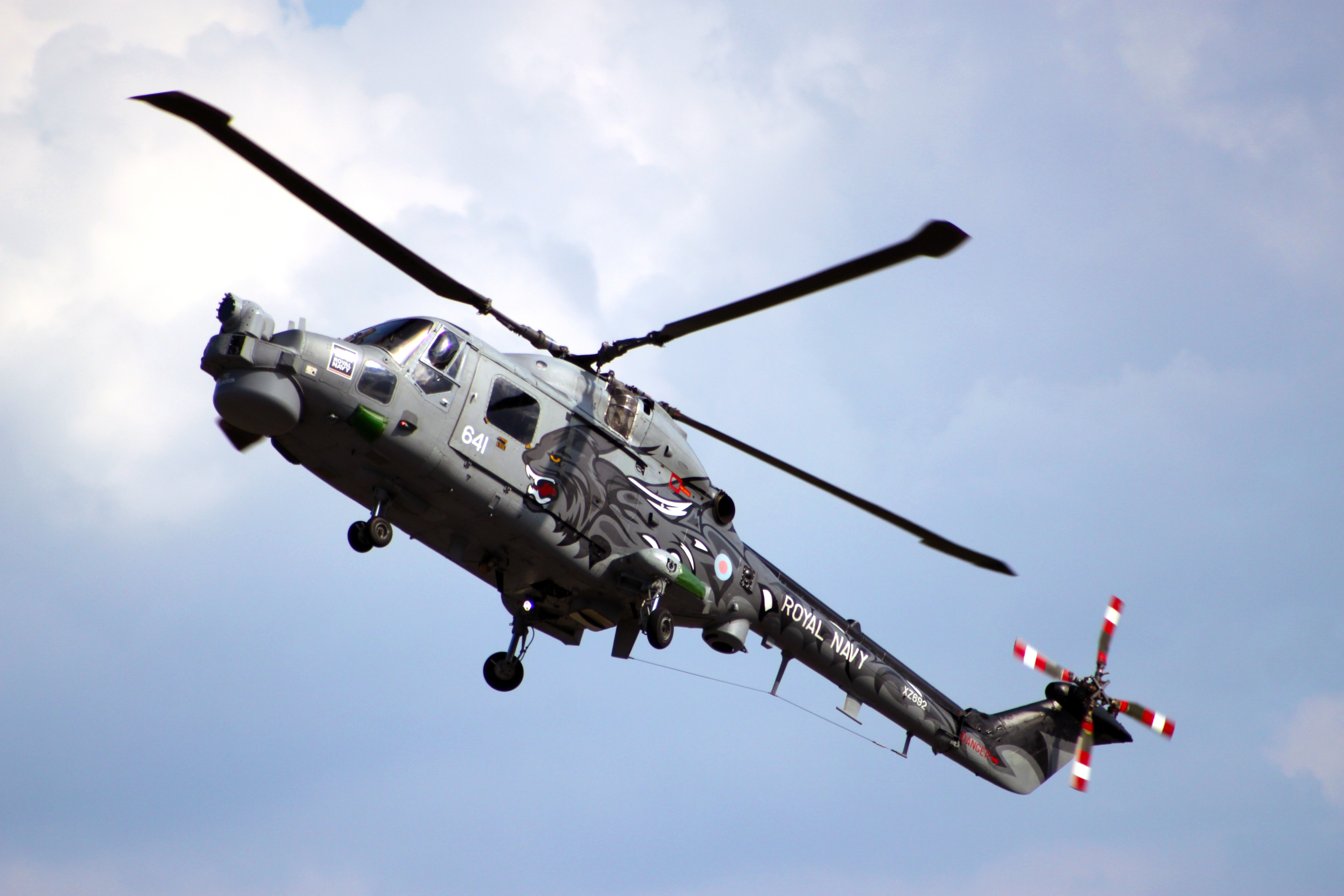
Westland Lynx; Black Cats

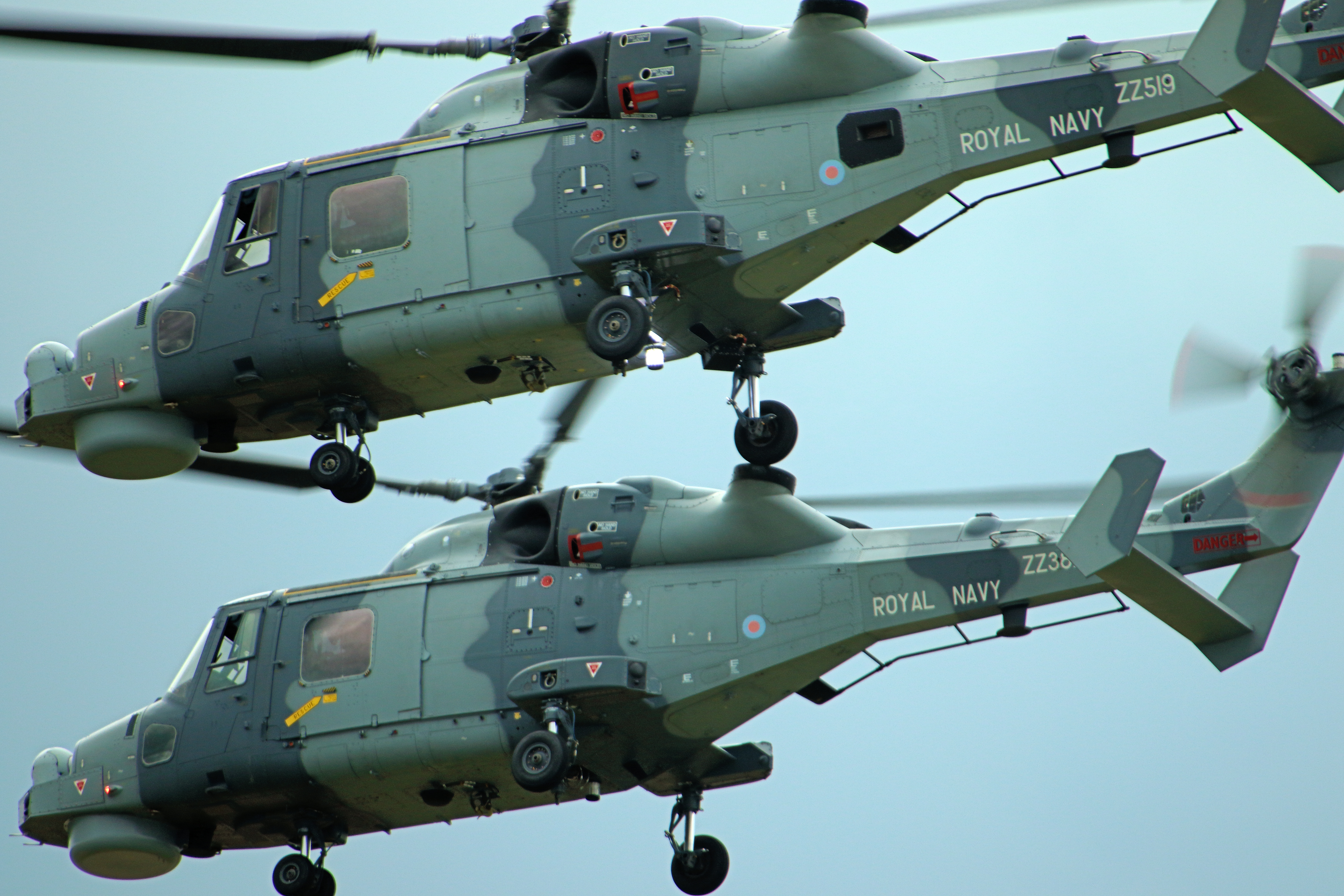
AgustaWestland Wildcat HMA2; Black Cats RIAT 2016

In 2001, the Royal Navy established a new helicopter display team, initially operating as the Lynx Pair. The Royal Navy describes it as the first official Royal Navy flying display team since the Sharks had been disbanded in the mid-1990s.

In 2004, the team adopted the name Black Cats. The team subsequently operated Westland Lynx helicopters and later transitioned to the Wildcat HMA.2. The Royal Navy continues to identify the Black Cats as its helicopter display team, with personnel drawn from 825 Naval Air Squadron and the Wildcat Maritime Force at RNAS Yeovilton.

== Named teams ==
The following formations have been identified by a distinctive name in the available evidence
Period	Team	Unit	Aircraft
1948	Royal Navy Aerobatic Team	806 Naval Air Squadron	de Havilland Sea Hornet; Hawker Sea Fury; de Havilland Sea Vampire
1957	Red Devils / Red Seahawks	738 Naval Air Squadron	Hawker Sea Hawk
1961	Royal Naval Aerobatic Team '61	800 Naval Air Squadron	Supermarine Scimitar
1962–1963	Fred's Five	766 Naval Air Squadron	de Havilland Sea Vixen FAW.1
1965–1969	Rough Diamonds	738 Naval Air Squadron	Hawker Hunter
1968	Phoenix Five	809 Naval Air Squadron	Blackburn Buccaneer
1968	Simon's Sircus	892 Naval Air Squadron	de Havilland Sea Vixen
1975–1980	Blue Herons	Fleet Requirements and Air Direction Unit (FRADU)	Hawker Hunter
1975–1996	Sharks	705 Naval Air Squadron	Westland Gazelle
2001–2004	Lynx Pair	702 Naval Air Squadron	Westland Lynx
2004–present	Black Cats	702 Naval Air Squadron; 825 Naval Air Squadron	Westland Lynx; AgustaWestland Wildcat

== Documented display formations ==
Not all Fleet Air Arm display activity involved a separately named team. Several squadrons are documented as having performed organised public formation displays or solo demonstrations without sufficient evidence for a distinct enduring team name.

In 1958, 800 NAS operated a seven-aircraft Sea Hawk formation at Farnborough.

In 1959, 807 NAS performed formation aerobatics at Farnborough with Scimitars.

Individual Fleet Air Arm pilots also performed solo displays during the 1960s and 1970s, including Sea Vixen displays at naval and civilian air shows.

These formations and solo displays are distinguished from the named teams above because the available evidence does not establish a separate, enduring team identity.

== See also ==
- Fleet Air Arm
- Royal Navy Historic Flight
- The Sharks (Royal Navy)
- Black Cats (Royal Navy)
- Fred's Five
- Simon's Sircus
