= Fred's Five =

Aerobatics display team of the Royal Navy

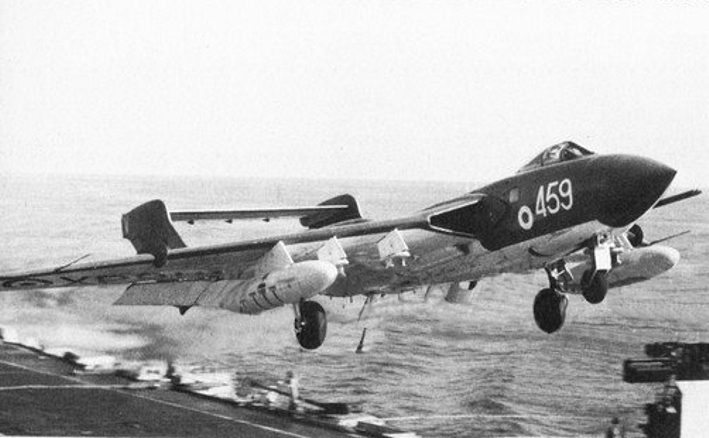
- de Havilland Sea Vixen FAW.1; of the type used by Fred's Five
- Active: 1962–1963
- Country: United Kingdom
- Branch: Royal Navy
- Type: Aerobatic display team
- Role: Public display / formation aerobatics
- Size: 5 aircraft
- Part of: 766 Naval Air Squadron
- Home station: RNAS Yeovilton
- Aircraft: de Havilland Sea Vixen FAW.1

Commanders
- Team Leader: Lieutenant Commander P.B. Reynolds

Fred's Five was a Fleet Air Arm aerobatic display team of the Royal Navy, formed by the Naval Fighter School at RNAS Yeovilton in 1962. The team operated de Havilland Sea Vixen FAW.1 aircraft from 766 Naval Air Squadron and performed at British air displays during the early 1960s.

== History ==
The Naval Fighter School, based at RNAS Yeovilton, Somerset and associated with 766 Squadron , operated the Sea Vixen FAW.1 for training and instructional duties. A display team was formed from the squadron in 1962 under the command of Lieutenant Commander P.B. Reynolds, RN.

Reynolds had been a Sea Vixen test pilot at the Aeroplane and Armament Experimental Establishment at MOD Boscombe Down and was commanding officer of 766 Squadron from approximately mid-1961 until early 1963. A later recollection identifies him as the leader of Fred's Five and as "Fred", although the precise origin of the team's name is not documented in the available sources.

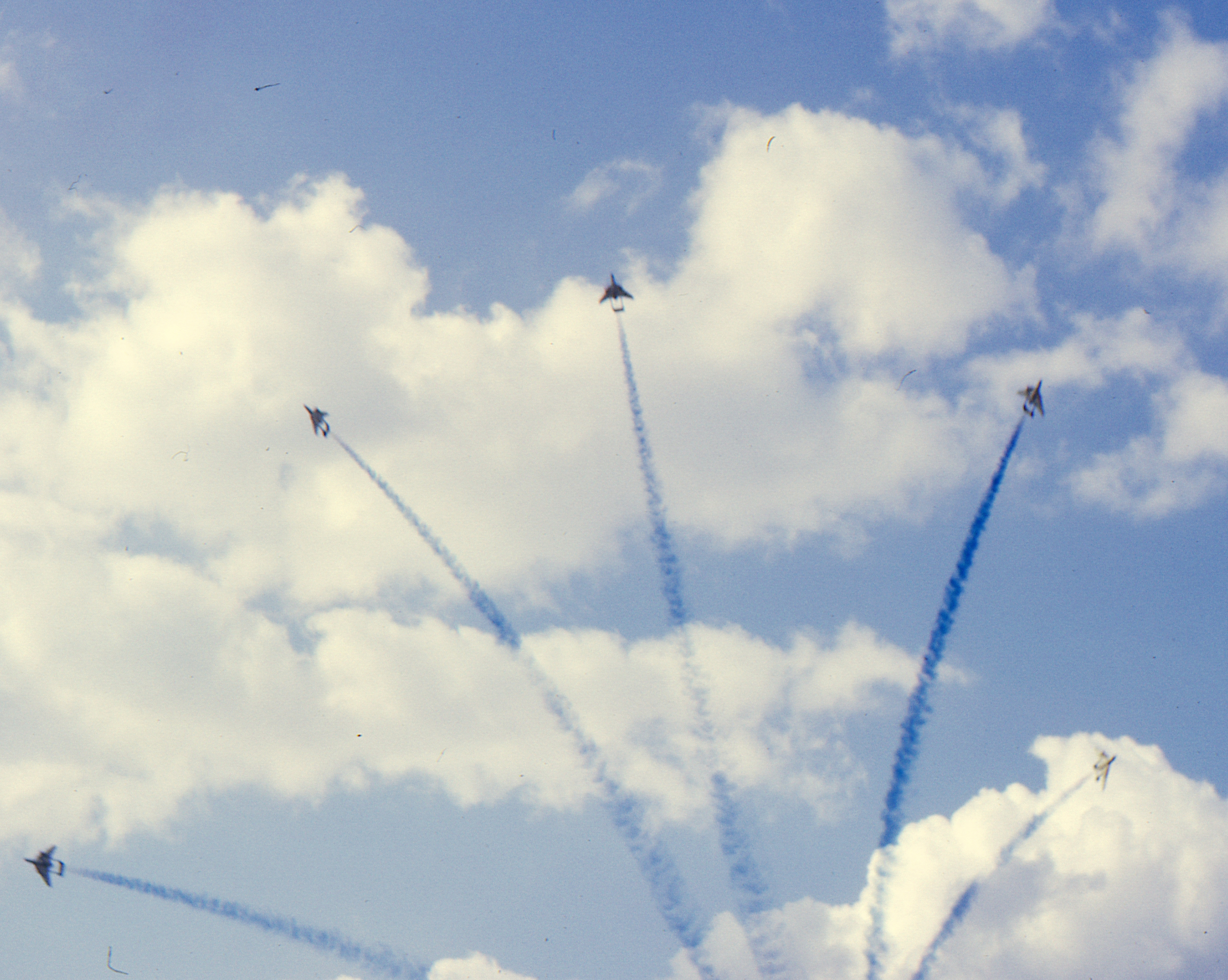
Sea Vixens FAW.1 in formation aerobatics at the SBAC show, Farnborough 8 September 1962.

Fred's Five flew at the Farnborough Air Display. Photographs preserved in the Sea Vixen historical archive show the team operating Sea Vixen FAW.1 aircraft, while one of the photographs is identified as originating from the official programme for the Farnborough event.

The team also participated in Fleet Air Arm air displays during the period. Photographs attributed to the 1962 RNAS Culdrose Air Day, RNAS Culdrose, Cornwall, show a Sea Vixen formation associated with Fred's Five.

The team continued to perform during 1963. This is supported by the flying logbook of Lieutenant Commander J.S. Mackonochie, OBE, RN, identified as a member of Fred's Five, which records display flying during that year.

Among the Fleet Air Arm personnel associated with Fred's Five was Lieutenant Commander Simon Idiens, RN. Idiens was subsequently the commander of Simon's Sircus, a six-aircraft Sea Vixen FAW.2 display team formed by 892 Naval Air Squadron in 1968. The Fleet Air Arm historical archive describes Idiens as a founder member of Fred's Five.

No reliable contemporary source has yet been identified establishing Fred's Five as an active display team during 1964. The currently available evidence therefore supports an operational period of 1962–1963.

== Aircraft ==
Fred's Five flew the de Havilland Sea Vixen FAW.1. The aircraft were operated by 766 Squadron rather than being a separately established permanent display fleet.

Five aircraft are identified in a surviving photograph associated with the team, listed from top to bottom as:

- XJ493
- XJ561
- XJ482
- XJ513
- XJ565

Individual aircraft histories provide further evidence of the team's use of particular Sea Vixens. XJ565, for example, is recorded as having participated with Fred's Five at Farnborough.

Some photographs appear to show six aircraft participating in a formation. This may reflect the use of an additional or reserve aircraft for particular displays; the available evidence is insufficient to establish a formal six-aircraft establishment for the team. The name "Fred's Five" and photographs showing five aircraft indicate that five aircraft was the normal formation.

== Personnel ==
A first-hand recollection by former team member Dave Eagles identifies the 1962 Farnborough team as being led by Lieutenant Commander Pete Reynolds. Eagles identified himself as the No. 2 pilot and named several other members of the formation, including Trevor Wilce, Knobby Hall, Dave McWilliam, Mike McCookweir and Chris Comins. Mike Ryan was identified as a publicity or reserve pilot.

The recollection is useful in identifying individuals associated with the team, but it is a self-published first-hand account rather than an independent published historical source. Consequently, the personnel list should not be regarded as definitive without further documentary corroboration.

== Legacy ==
Fred's Five was the first of the two Fleet Air Arm display teams to operate the Sea Vixen. Its successor in the Sea Vixen display role was not formed until 1968, when 892 Naval Air Squadron established Simon's Sircus, commanded by former Fred's Five member Simon Idiens.

The two teams represent the principal periods in which the Sea Vixen was used by the Royal Navy for specialist aerobatic display flying.

== See also ==
- Royal Navy and Fleet Air Arm aerobatic teams
