= Rough Diamonds display team =

Royal Navy Fleet Air Arm aerobatic display team

Rough Diamonds
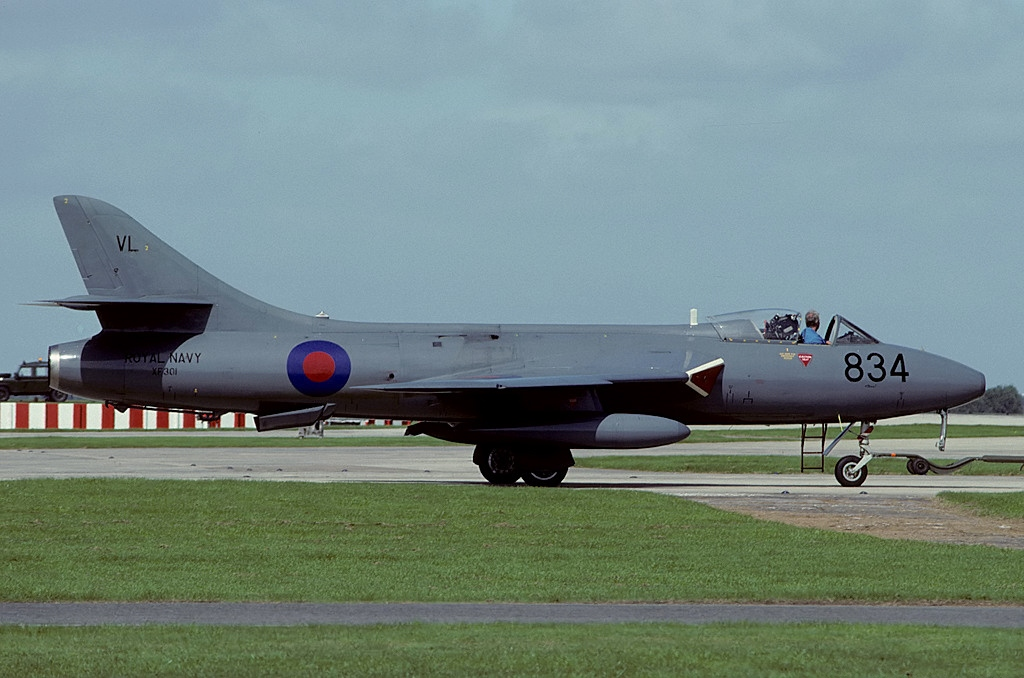
- Hawker Hunter GA.11; 'XF301' used by the Rough Diamonds
- Active: 1965–1969
- Country: United Kingdom
- Branch: Royal Navy
- Type: Aerobatic display team
- Role: Public display / formation aerobatics
- Size: Four aircraft
- Part of: 738 Naval Air Squadron
- Home station: RNAS Brawdy
- Aircraft: Hawker Hunter

Commanders
- Notable commanders: Lieutenant Commander Christopher Comins, RN

Rough Diamonds was a Fleet Air Arm aerobatic display team formed from 738 Naval Air Squadron at RNAS Brawdy in Wales in 1965. The team flew Hawker Hunter jet aircraft and was led by Lieutenant Commander Christopher Comins, Royal Navy. It made public air display appearances during the 1960s and was disbanded in 1969.

== Formation and background ==
738 Naval Air Squadron was operating the Hawker Hunter in the Fleet Air Arm's advanced flying training programme during the early 1960s. The squadron moved from RNAS Lossiemouth, Moray in Scotland to RNAS Brawdy in Pembrokeshire, Wales, on 6 January 1964, where it provided the second phase of advanced flying training, including instruction in fighter tactics and weapons release.

During the summer of 1965, an aerobatics display team was formed from 738 Naval Air Squadron at RNAS Brawdy. The team was named the Rough Diamonds and was led by Lieutenant Commander Christopher Comins, Royal Navy. The Rough Diamonds were one of a number of Royal Navy and Fleet Air Arm display formations to operate the Hawker Hunter during the 1960s.

== Aircraft and markings ==
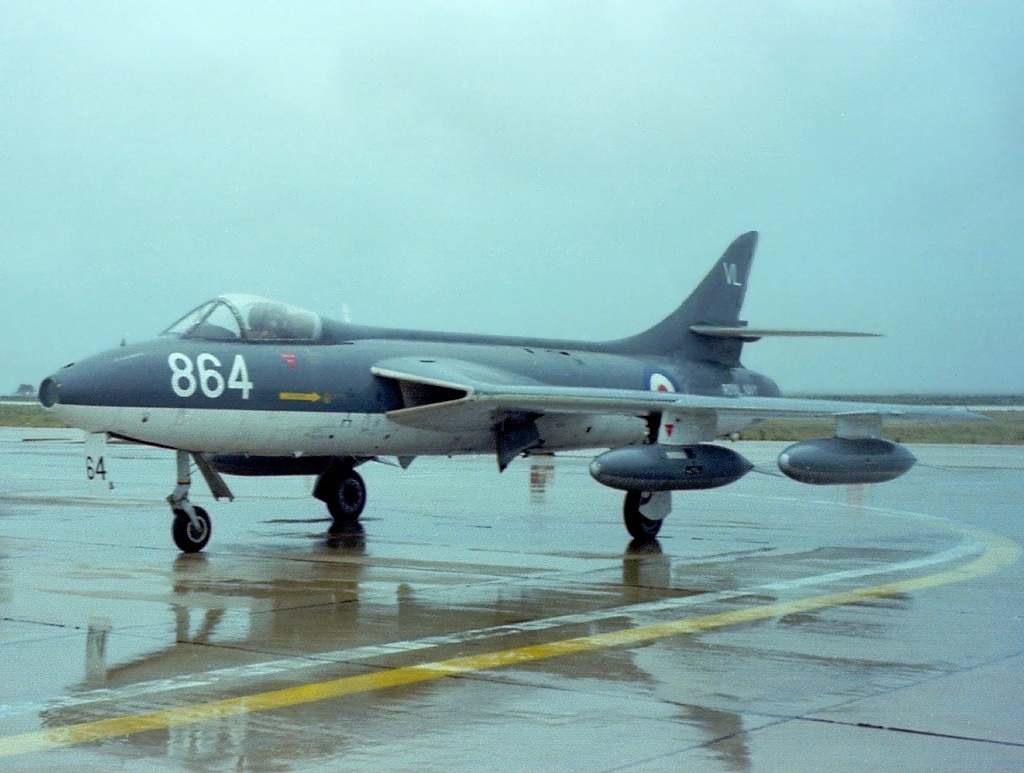
Hawker Hunter GA.11; an example of the type and colour schemed used

The Rough Diamonds operated four Hawker Hunter aircraft, with a spare aircraft attached to the team. The Hunters retained the standard Fleet Air Arm colour scheme of Extra Dark Sea Grey over white. The aircraft flown by team leader Christopher Comins was distinguished by Day-Glo red markings on the nose, fuselage spine and wingtips.

The aircraft associated with the team carried the code BY, identifying their association with RNAS Brawdy and the 'Pegasus' marking of 738 Naval Air Squadron. The 738 Naval Air Squadron history records the display team as using three single-seat Hunter GA.11 aircraft and a twin-seat Hunter T.8 during its period at RNAS Brawdy.

Individual aircraft associated with the Rough Diamonds are also documented in surviving aircraft histories. Hawker Hunter GA.11 XF301 joined 738 Naval Air Squadron at RNAS Brawdy in September 1965 and was regularly used by the squadron's Rough Diamonds display team during its subsequent service with the unit.

Hawker Hunter GA.11 XF297 is identified in the July 1979 issue of Aeroplane Monthly as an aircraft of the Rough Diamonds aerobatic team of 738 Squadron at RNAS Brawdy in 1967.

== Display career ==
The Rough Diamonds represented 738 Naval Air Squadron at public air displays during their period of operation. The team is documented as participating in the Royal Naval Air Day at RNAS Yeovilton on 9 June 1967.

The Rough Diamonds were disbanded in 1969. 738 Naval Air Squadron continued operating at Brawdy until 1970.

== See also ==
- Fleet Air Arm
- RNAS Brawdy
- Hawker Hunter
- Royal Navy
- Royal Navy and Fleet Air Arm aerobatic teams

== Bibliography ==
- Ballance, Theo; Howard, Lee; Sturtivant, Ray (2016). The Squadrons and Units of the Fleet Air Arm. Air-Britain (Historians) Ltd. ISBN 978-0-85130-489-2.
- Derry, Martin; Robinson, Neil (2018). Hawker Hunter in British Service. Flight Craft. Vol. 16. Pen & Sword Aviation. ISBN 978-1-5267-4249-0.
- Gunston, Bill (July 1979). "Hawker Hunter, part 2". Aeroplane Monthly.
