= Simon's Sircus =

Aerobatics display team of the Royal Navy

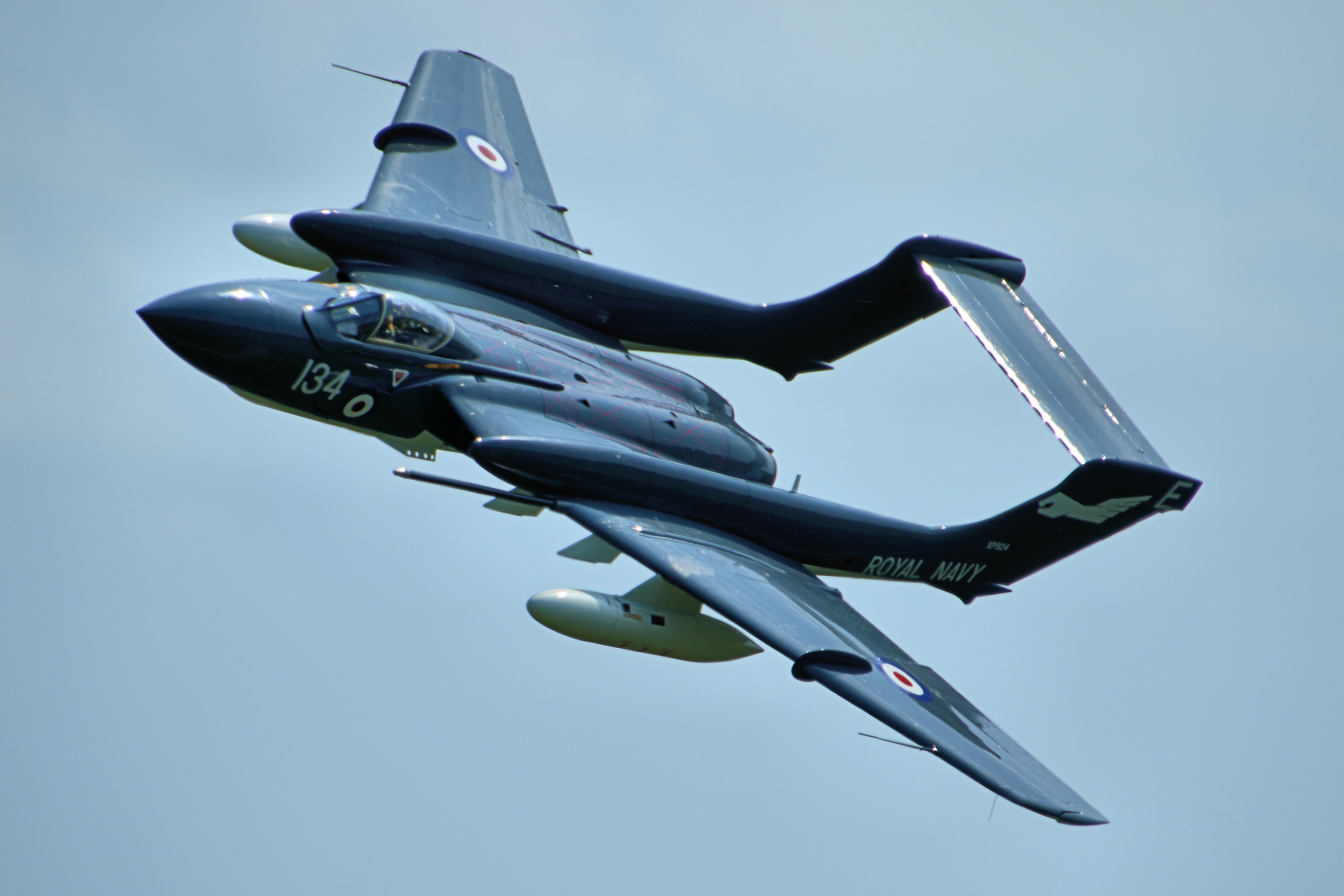
- de Havilland Sea Vixen FAW.2 aircraft
- Active: 1968
- Country: United Kingdom
- Branch: Royal Navy
- Type: Aerobatic display team
- Role: Public display / formation aerobatics
- Size: Six aircraft
- Home station: RNAS Yeovilton
- Mascot: Lion cub called Simon
- Aircraft: de Havilland Sea Vixen FAW.2

Commanders
- Team Leader: Lieutenant Commander Simon Idiens

Simon's Sircus was a Royal Navy (RN) Fleet Air Arm (FAA) aerobatic display team formed in 1968 by 892 Naval Air Squadron, flying the de Havilland Sea Vixen FAW.2. Created under the leadership of Lieutenant Commander Simon Idiens, RN, the team operated for a single display season and became noted for its six‑ship formation routines, an unusual and visually striking use of the Sea Vixen interceptor. Simon's Sircus performed at Royal Navy open days, regional airshows and the SBAC Farnborough Air Show, where it made its final and most prominent appearance.

Simon's Sircus was named in honour of both its commanding officer, Lieutenant Commander Simon Idiens, RN, and its mascot, a young lion cub from Longleat House, also called Simon.

== History ==
=== Formation ===
In early 1968, 892 Naval Air Squadron returned to RNAS Yeovilton after disembarking from HMS Hermes, concluding the Sea Vixen's final carrier deployment. Although the squadron was scheduled for disbandment as the Fleet Air Arm transitioned to the Phantom FG.1, flying continued ashore to maintain pilot proficiency. During this period, the commanding officer, Lieutenant Commander Simon Idiens, was tasked with forming a six‑aircraft Sea Vixen FAW.2 display team for the upcoming airshow season.

The team adopted the name Simon's Sircus, a play on Idiens’ surname and consistent with the Fleet Air Arm's tradition of humorous aerobatic team titles. A previous Sea Vixen display team, Fred's Five, had operated the Sea Vixen FAW.1 variant in 1962, but Simon's Sircus represented the most ambitious use of the type in formation aerobatics.

=== Personnel ===
- Lieutenant Commander Simon Idiens – Team Leader

Lieutenant Commander Simon Idiens served as the commanding officer of 892 Naval Air Squadron during its final Sea Vixen FAW.2 deployment aboard HMS Hermes. After the squadron returned to RNAS Yeovilton in early 1968, Idiens was tasked with forming a six‑ship display team for the forthcoming airshow season. His leadership gave the team its name, "Simon’s Sircus", reflecting both his role and the Fleet Air Arm's tradition of humorous aerobatic team titles.

- Senior Pilot Team

The display pilots were drawn from the experienced Sea Vixen aircrew of 892 NAS, many of whom had recently completed carrier operations in the Indian Ocean and Far East. Their operational background in fleet air defence flying contributed to the precision and discipline required for close‑formation aerobatics. Former members later recalled the demanding nature of the routines, particularly given the aircraft's size, asymmetric cockpit layout and high thrust levels.

- Observer Officers

As with all Sea Vixen operations, each aircraft carried a second crew member, the Observer, seated in the right‑hand cockpit. Observers played a crucial role in navigation, radar operation and safety monitoring during displays, ensuring situational awareness while pilots focused on formation integrity.

== Aircraft ==
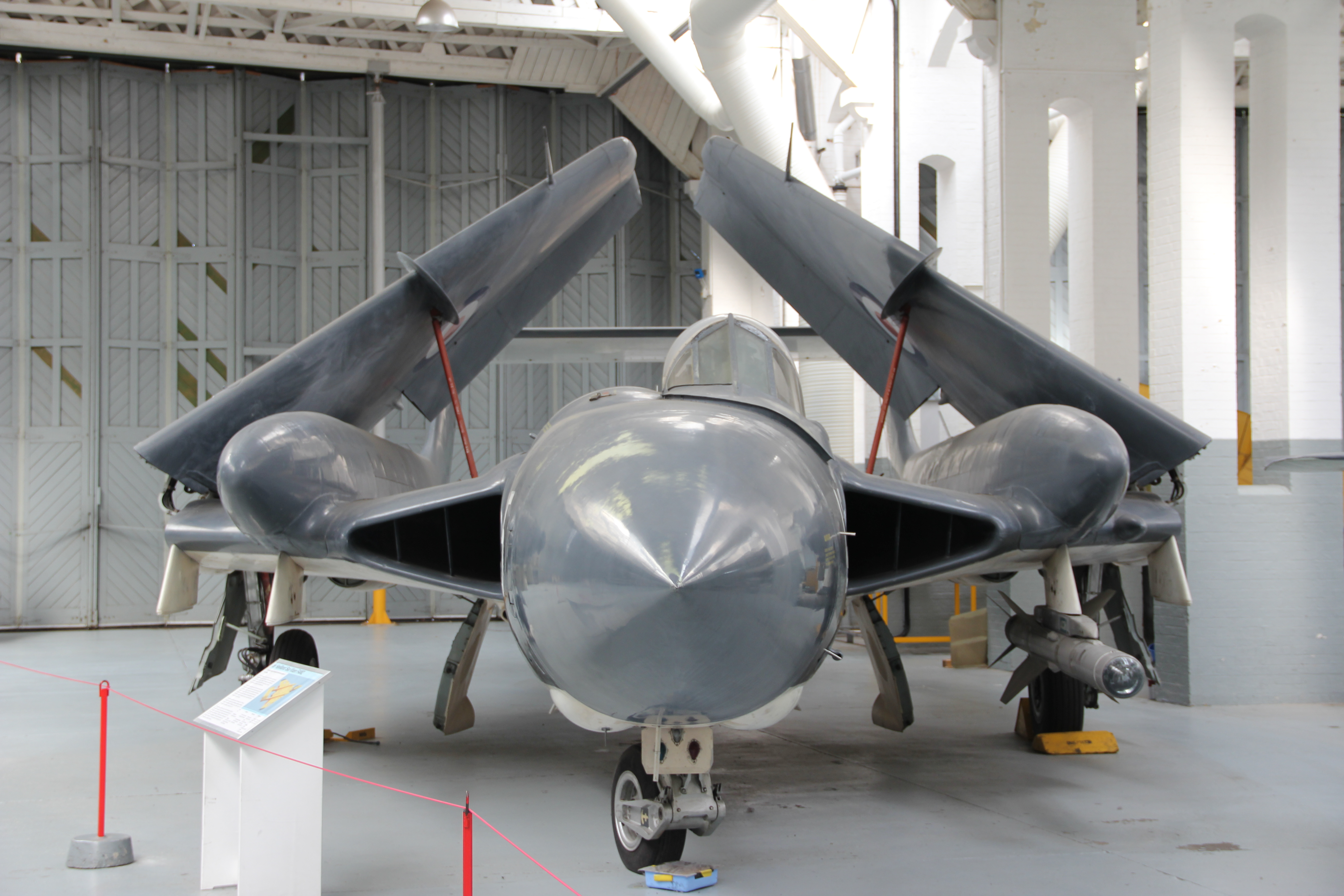
de Havilland Sea Vixen FAW.2 with its distinctive offset cockpit

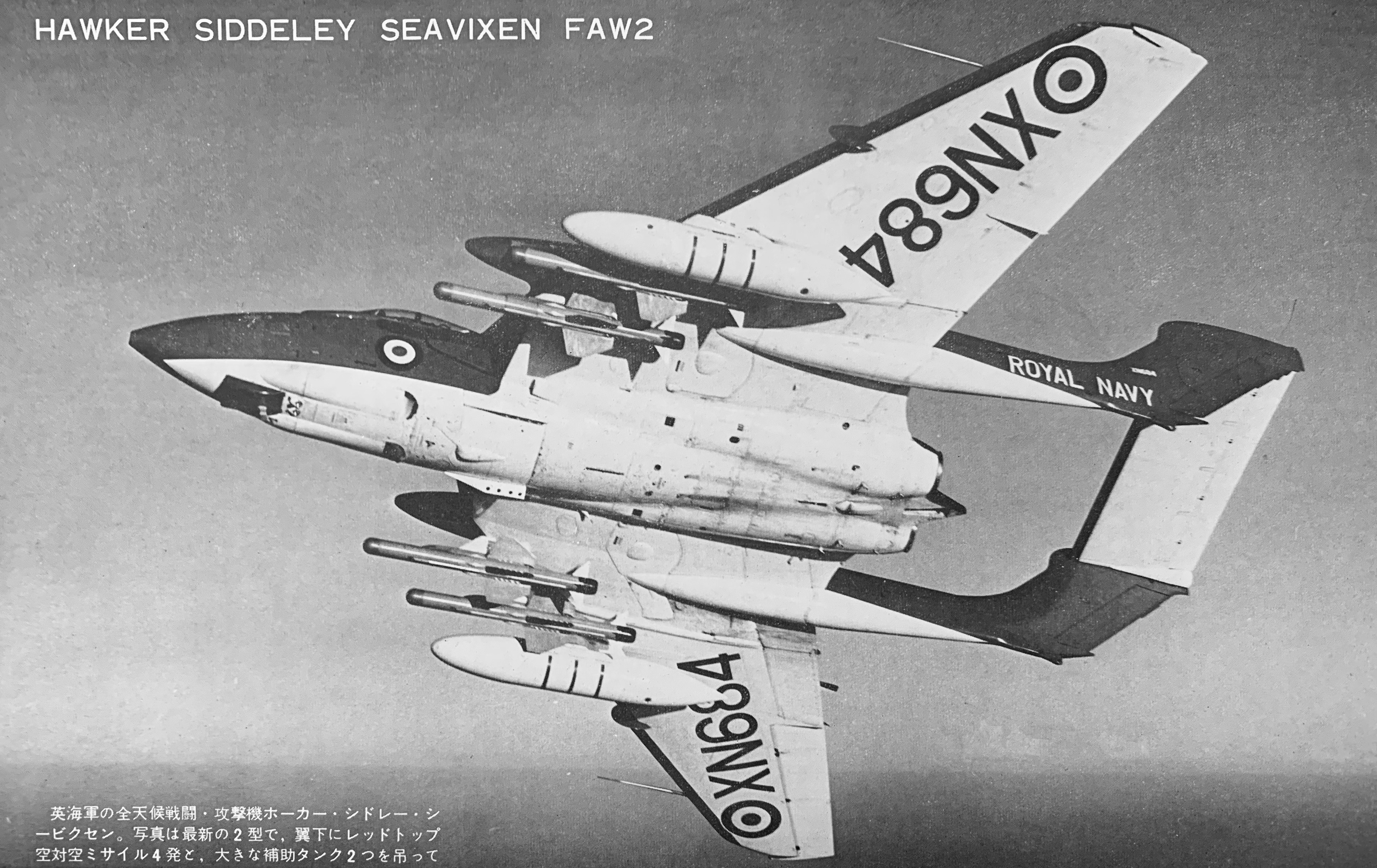
de Havilland Sea Vixen FAW2 showing the twin-boom tail and missile-only configuration

Simon's Sircus flew the de Havilland Sea Vixen FAW.2, the final development of the DH.110 design. The FAW.2 incorporated increased fuel capacity, updated avionics and compatibility with the Red Top missile. Its distinctive offset cockpit, twin‑boom tail and missile‑only armament made it one of the most recognisable British jet fighters of the Cold War.

Although designed primarily for fleet air defence, the Sea Vixen proved capable of dramatic formation displays when flown by experienced Fleet Air Arm crews. The squadron operated seven aircraft in early 1968, allowing a six‑ship display team with one reserve airframe.

Simon's Sircus drew its aircraft from the seven Sea Vixen FAW.2s operated by 892 Naval Air Squadron in early 1968. These airframes formed the squadron's final operational pool before the transition to the Phantom FG.1. Known Sea Vixen FAW.2 serials associated with 892 NAS during this period include:

- XJ580
- XJ582
- XJ584
- XJ585
- XJ586
- XJ588
- XJ589

These aircraft provided sufficient availability for a six‑ship display team with one reserve airframe.

== Display Season ==
=== Operations ===
Simon's Sircus began its work‑up phase at RNAS Yeovilton in May 1968, shortly after returning from HMS Hermes. Training focused on developing stable six‑ship formations, including line‑astern, echelon and diamond patterns. Pilots later described the Sea Vixen as demanding in close formation due to its weight, powerful engines and offset cockpit, which required careful throttle coordination and constant visual reference.

The team's routines emphasised smooth, sweeping manoeuvres rather than abrupt aerobatics, reflecting the aircraft's role as an all‑weather interceptor rather than a lightweight display jet. Displays typically began with a formation fly‑past, followed by turns and climbing sequences designed to showcase the Sea Vixen's distinctive twin‑boom silhouette.

Operational constraints included limited aircraft availability, the squadron operated only seven Sea Vixen FAW.2s in 1968 and the impending disbandment of 892 NAS as the Fleet Air Arm transitioned to the Phantom FG.1. Despite these challenges, Simon's Sircus completed a full display season culminating in its appearance at the SBAC Farnborough Air Show.

=== Displays ===
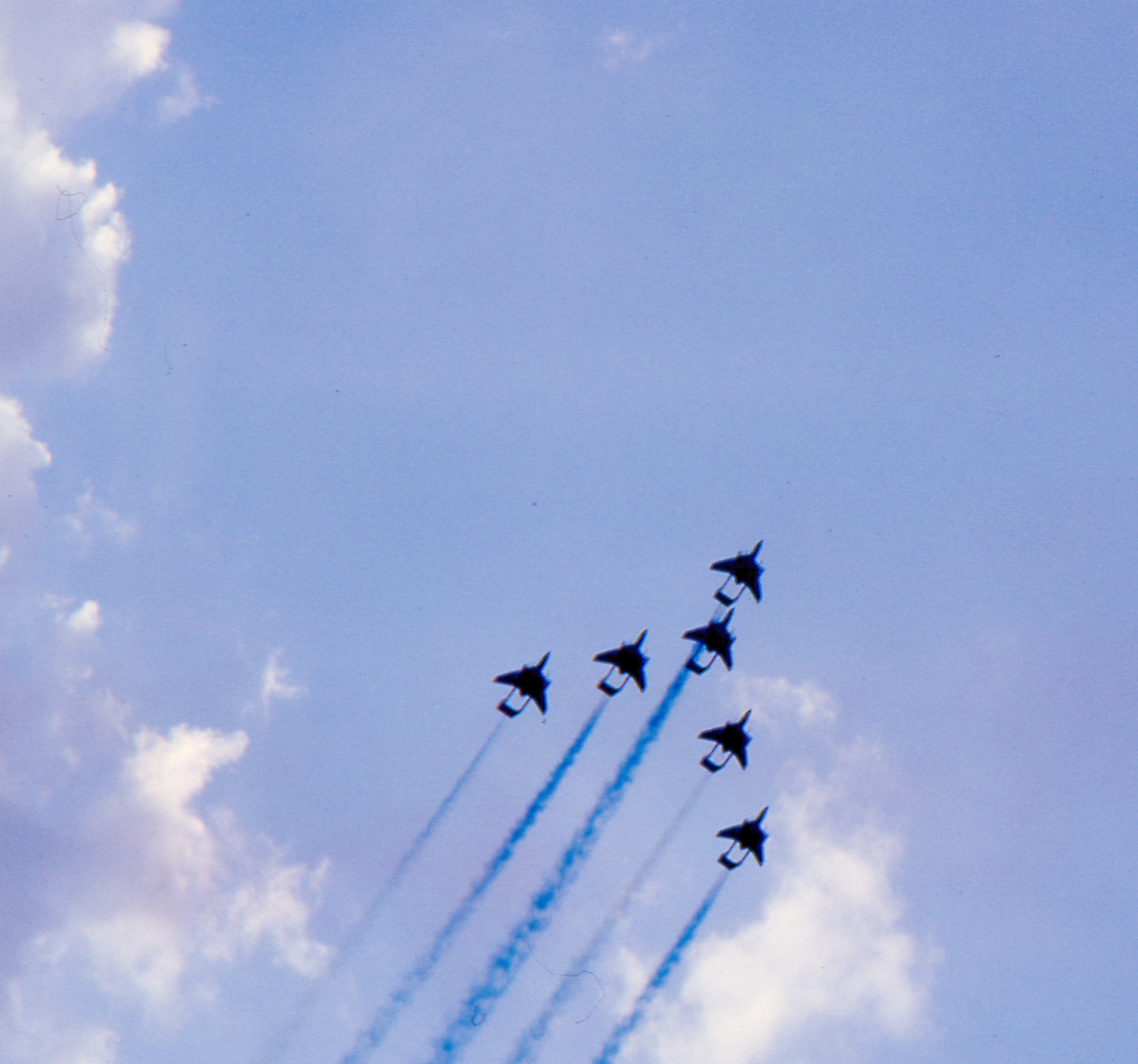
de Havilland Sea Vixen six ship formation; an example of Simon's Sircus

Simon's Sircus operated only during the 1968 display season, performing at Royal Navy open days, regional airshows and major public events. The team's routines featured close‑formation flying with six Sea Vixen FAW.2s—an unusual sight given the aircraft's size and reputation as a heavy all‑weather interceptor rather than a manoeuvrable display platform.

Culminating in the SBAC Farnborough Airshow in September. The main element of the team's display began with a steep turn and then a loop in 'broad arrow' formation, changing to 'box six' during the second manoeuvre. This was followed by a barrel roll in 'long arrow' formation, a loop in 'spearhead' formation and lastly a 'bomb burst' and finale. The team were highly acclaimed by many who saw them display, due in no small part to the fact that the Sea Vixens used were over five times heavier than the Folland Gnats used by the well known Red Arrows aerobatic team of the RAF.

=== Chronological Display Table ===
Display appearances of Simon's Sircus during the 1968 season
Date	Event / Venue	Location	Notes
May 1968	Work-up displays	RNAS Yeovilton	Formation training following return from HMS Hermes.
June 1968	Royal Navy / Fleet Air Arm open days	Various naval air stations	Public debut of the six‑ship formation.
July 1968	Regional airshows	Southern England	Full aerobatic routine performed; noted for demanding close‑formation manoeuvres.
September 1968	SBAC Farnborough Air Show	Farnborough, Hampshire	Final major appearance; widely regarded as the team's most memorable display.

Following the conclusion of the Farnborough displays Simon's Sircus and 892 Squadron were officially disbanded.

== Legacy ==
Although Simon's Sircus existed for only a single season, it left a lasting impression on British airshow audiences. The team's performances showcased the Sea Vixen at the end of its front‑line career and contributed to the aircraft's enduring public profile. A preserved Sea Vixen FAW.2 (G‑CVIX) continued to fly on the UK airshow circuit into the 21st century, maintaining interest in both the aircraft and the display team that helped popularise it.

== See also ==
- Royal Navy and Fleet Air Arm aerobatic teams
