= List of people from Southend-on-Sea =

This is a list of people from the city of Southend-on-Sea, England who have become known notable in different roles and professions. The list also contains the people who have been awarded the freedom of the city. Southend-on-Sea is located in the county of Essex, 40 miles from London.

== Notable people ==
- Shenda Amery, sculpturer
- David Amess (1952–2021), British politician and local MP who was murdered in 2021; Southend was named a city in his honour.
- Jasmine Armfield, actress
- Sir Edwin Arnold (1832–1904), poet and journalist, writer of The Light of Asia
- David Atkinson, politician
- Trevor Bailey (1923–2011), cricketer
- John Barber (1919–2004), former finance director of Ford of Europe & managing director of British Leyland
- Fred Barnes (1885–1938), singer
- Mathew Baynton, musician, writer, actor
- Bishop James Bellord (1846–1905), Vicar Apostolic of Gibraltar and Titular Bishop of Milevum
- David Bellos, professor/translator
- Angie Best, model and ex-wife of George Best
- Brinn Bevan, artistic gymnast
- James Booth (1927–2005), actor
- James Bourne, musician, singer Busted
- Tim Bowler, children's author
- Kevin Bowyer, concert organist
- Bernard Braine, Baron Braine of Wheatley (1915–2000), politician, died in Southend.
- Rosina Brandram (1845–1907), opera singer and actress
- Gary Brooker (1945–2022), lead singer of The Paramounts and Procol Harum
- Dave Brown, comedian and actor
- Robert Williams Buchanan (1841–1901), Scottish poet, buried in St John's Church, Southend
- Gustav Burton, racing driver
- Cameron Carter-Vickers (born 1997), footballer who played for the United States national team
- Dean Chalkley, photographer
- Aidan Chambers, author
- Jeannie Clark, former professional wrestling manager
- Brian Cleeve (1921–2003), author and broadcaster
- Dick Clement, screenwriter
- Dorothy Coke (1897–1979), artist
- Eric Kirkham Cole (1901–1966), founder of EKCO
- Peter Cook, architect
- Phil Cornwell, actor and impressionist
- Tina Cousins, singer
- Gemma Craven, actress
- Rosalie Cunningham, singer-songwriter-multi-instrumentalist
- Matthew Cutler, ballroom dancer
- Danielle Dax, musician, actress and performance artist
- Warwick Deeping (1877–1950), author
- Richard de Southchurch, knight and landowner.
- Andy Ducat (1886–1942), cricketer, footballer.
- Sam Duckworth, musician
- Mike Edmonds, actor
- Warren Ellis, novelist and comic writer
- Nathalie Emmanuel, actress
- Digby Fairweather, jazz musician, author, founder of the National Jazz Archive.
- Mark Foster, swimmer
- John Fowles (1926–2005), author
- Becky Frater, first female helicopter commander in the Royal Navy and female member of the Black Cats display team
- John Georgiadis(1939–2021), violinist, conductor for Bangkok Symphony Orchestra and the Malaysian Philharmonic Orchestra
- Edward Greenfield (1928–2015) chief music writer in The Guardian from 1977 to 1993 and biographer of Andre Previn
- Benjamin Grosvenor, pianist
- Daniel Hardcastle, author
- Roy Hay, musician with Culture Club
- Joshua Hayward, guitarist for The Horrors
- William Heddle (1847–1948), Supreme Bishop of the Peculiar People 1901-1942
- John Hodge (1929–2021), aerospace engineer
- John Horsley (1920–2014), actor
- John Hutton, politician
- Dominic Iorfa, football player
- Colin Ireland (1954–2012), serial killer
- Wilko Johnson (1947–2022), singer, guitarist and songwriter; Game of Thrones actor
- Daniel Jones, musician, producer
- R. A. Jones (1849–1925), jeweller and town benefactor
- Phill Jupitus, comedian
- Mickey Jupp, musician
- Russell Kane, comedian
- Laura Keeble, artist
- Murray David Maitland Keddie (1929–2018), owner of Keddies, founder of Essex Radio and former High Sheriff of Essex.
- Dominic Littlewood, TV presenter
- David Lloyd, tennis player
- John Lloyd, tennis player
- Robert Lloyd, opera singer
- Ron Martin, Southend United chairman, 1998-2024
- Frank Matcham (1854–1920), English theatre designer, retired and died in Southend
- Lee Mead, musical theatre actor
- Jon Miller (1921–2008), TV presenter
- Helen Mirren, actress
- Jack Monroe, blogger, campaigner
- Peggy Mount (1915–2001), actress
- Tris Vonna Michell, artist
- Maajid Nawaz, former Islamist activist who now campaigns against extremism
- Julian Okai, English footballer
- Michael Osborne, first-class cricketer
- Ron Pember (1934–2022), actor
- Annabel Port, broadcaster
- Stephen Port, serial killer
- Spencer Prior, footballer
- Lara Pulver, actress
- Roy Walter Purdy (died 1982), propaganda broadcaster and informer at Colditz
- Rachel Riley, Countdown co-presenter
- Simon Schama, historian / TV presenter
- Clement Scott (1841–1904), theatre critic
- Anne Stallybrass (1938–2021), actress
- Vivian Stanshall (1943–1995), musician
- Sam Strike, actor
- Ruby Tandoh, baker
- Keith Taylor (1953–2022), politician
- Peter Taylor, footballer and football manager
- Theoretical Girl, singer-songwriter
- Steve Tilson, footballer and football manager, voted Southend United's greatest ever player
- Kara Tointon, actress
- Hannah Tointon, actress
- Robin Trower, rock-blues guitarist
- L. C. Tyler, author
- Clive Uptton (1911–2006), illustrator attended Southend Art College
- Gary Vandermolen, footballer
- Benjamin Waugh (1839–1908), campaigner and founder of NSPCC, buried at Sutton Road cemetery
- David Webb, football manager
- Paul Webb, musician, bassist for Talk Talk
- Rhys "Spider" Webb, bassist of The Horrors
- Toby Whithouse, actor and screenwriter
- Michael Wilding (1912–1979), actor
- David Witts, actor
- C. R. Alder Wright (1844–1894), scientist - founder of the Royal Institute of Chemistry and inventor of Heroin
- Ian Yearsley, local historian and author
- Nothing But Thieves, musicians

== Freedom of the city ==
The following people and military units have received the Freedom of the City, or the previous awarded Freedom of the Borough of Southend-on-Sea.

=== Individuals ===
- Joseph Francis: 17 December 1918
- R. A. Jones: 18 April 1919
- William Gregson: 22 November 1921
- Sir Frederick William Senier: 19 February 1929
- Rupert Guinness, 2nd Earl of Iveagh: 18 October 1932
- Gwendolen Guinness, Countess of Iveagh: 18 October 1932
- John Henry Burrows: 18 July 1933
- Albert Martin: 18 July 1933
- William Miles: 21 May 1940
- Herbert James Worwood: 18 September 1945
- Margaret Edith Reay: 30 March 1949
- Stephen Frost Johnson: 18 March 1950
- Ellis Gowing: 31 March 1954
- Chalton Hubbard: 31 March 1954
- Edward Cecil Jones: 20 April 1955
- Alex Hemsley White: 20 January 1965
- John Edwin Longman: 9 October 1968
- William Harold Clough: 9 October 1968
- Archibald Glen: 25 March 1971
- Lady Doris Katherine McAdden: 22 April 1982
- Norman Harris: 4 April 1984
- Albert Victor Mussett: 17 January 1985
- Frederick Geoffrey Laws: 17 January 1985
- Frederick Royston Peacock: 11 May 1989
- Jean Mary Sargent: 11 May 1989
- Eric James Trevett: 11 May 1989
- Bernard Birn: 5 August 1991
- Derek Comedy Flatley:16 July 1992
- Norman Clarke: 19 September 1996
- Philip Hyatt Herbert: 19 September 1996
- Beryl Stella Scholfield: 15 October 1998
- Trevor Bailey: 13 July 2000
- Pat Barnett: 13 July 2000
- Kenneth Crowe: 13 July 2000
- Peggy Fairless: 13 July 2000
- Richard 'Digby' Fairweather: 13 July 2000
- Leonard Forge: 13 July 2000
- Steve George: 13 July 2000
- Paul Gilson: 13 July 2000
- Barry Godwin: 13 July 2000
- Norma Heigho: 13 July 2000
- Ian Johnson: 13 July 2000
- Hilda May: 13 July 2000
- John May: 13 July 2000
- Clifton Jay Morehouse: 13 July 2000
- Richard Offord: 13 July 2000
- Eileen Smith: 13 July 2000
- Peter Thorn: 13 July 2000
- Antony F. Tomassi: 13 July 2000
- Arthur Wood: 13 July 2000
- Jim Worsdale: 13 July 2000
- Paul Channon, Lord Kelvedon: 26 November 2003
- Ronald Kennedy: 26 November 2003
- Michael Woodford: 26 November 2003
- Sir Teddy Taylor: 30 September 2004
- Robert Tinlin: 23 February 2017
- David Norman: 25 January 2022
- Garry Lowen: 25 January 2022
- David Amess: 1 March 2022
- David Stanley: 24 July 2023.
- Kevin Maher: 21 March 2024.
- Roger Humphrey: 24 April 2025
- Rosemary Pennington: 24 April 2025
- David Garston: 11 May 2026

=== Military Units ===
- The 3rd Battalion The Royal Anglian Regiment: 1964
- 1st Battalion The Royal Anglian Regiment: 17 June 2010.
- Royal Air Force No.54 Reserve Squadron: 2016
