= Naval air station =

Military airbase under naval command

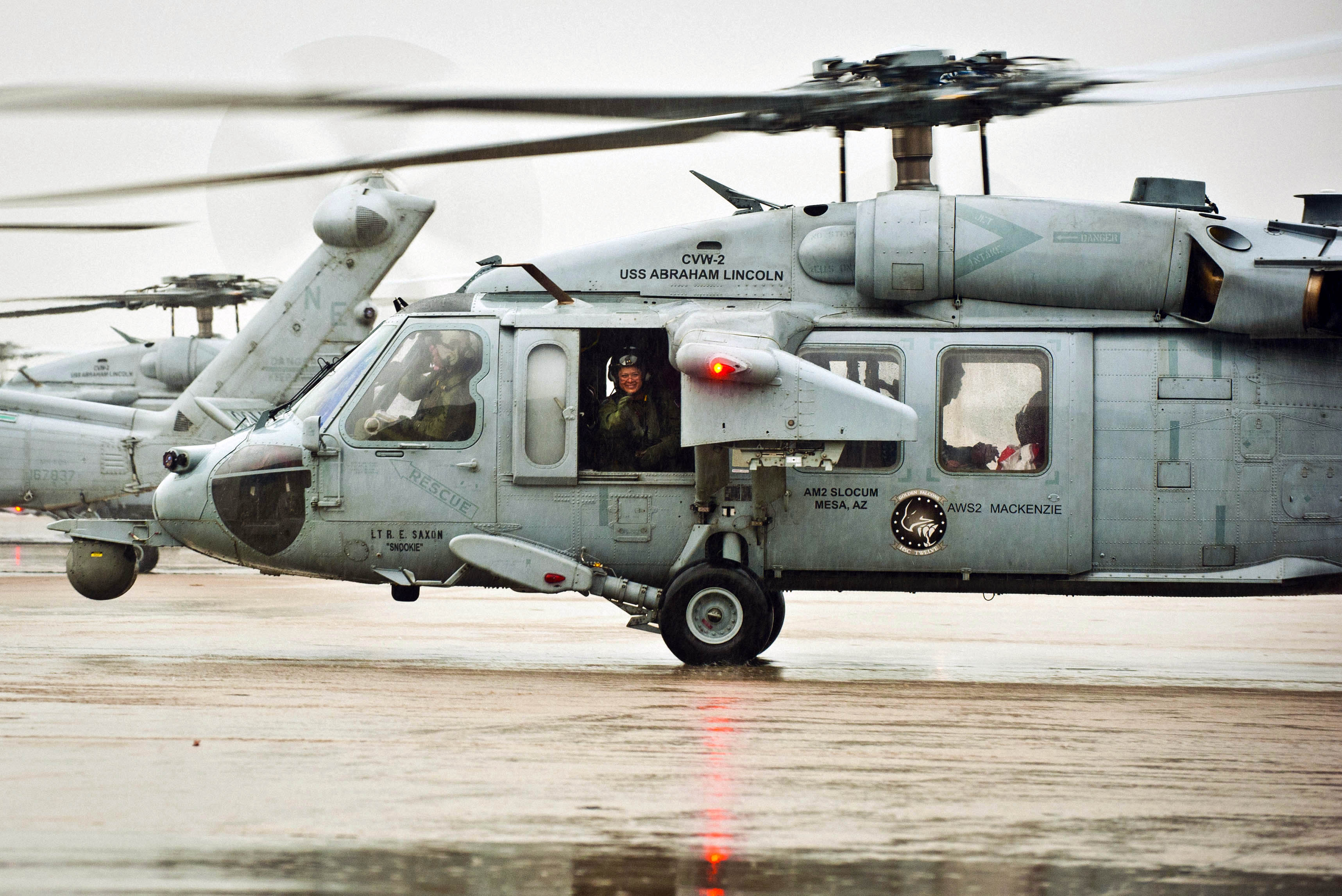
MH-60S helicopters at NAS North Island, California, circa 2011

A naval air station (NAS) or navy airbase is a military air base under the command of a navy, dedicated to the use of aircraft for naval operations. These bases are typically populated by squadrons, groups or wings of navalised aircraft, their various support facilities, and other tenant commands.

The term "naval air station" is used by many countries' navies, such as the United States Navy, the Royal Australian Navy, the Royal Navy, and the Indian Navy. In the case of the U.S. Navy, similar facilities in the U.S. Marine Corps are known as Marine Corps Air Stations and facilities in the U.S. Coast Guard are known as Coast Guard Air Stations.

== Argentinean Navy ==
The Argentine Naval Aviation operates four Base Aeronaval (BAN): from BAN Punta Indio (BAPI) in Buenos Aires Province through BAN Comandante Espora (BACE) and BAN Almirante Zar (BAAZ) in Patagonia to BAN Almirante Quijada (BARD) at Tierra del Fuego. Runways also serve domestic airlines at almost all Argentine military air bases. The Navy operates Estacion Aeronaval (EAN) (stations) which have smaller crews and are not normally assigned aircraft. These include Ezeiza, Rio Gallegos and Ushuaia.

The Argentine Naval Prefecture, serving as the Coast Guard, also operates air stations at Posadas, Buenos Aires, Mar del Plata, and Comodoro Rivadavia. Aircraft operating out of these bases are heavily involved in air/sea rescues.

== Royal Australian Navy ==
In Australia, there is one Naval air station, HMAS Albatross in Nowra, and the formal Naval Aircraft Repair Yard and apprentice training establishment at HMAS Nirimba in Nirimba Fields, Sydney.

HMAS Albatross, commissioned in August 1948, serves as the home of the Royal Australian Navy's Fleet Air Arm, supporting various aircraft squadrons and housing the Fleet Air Arm Museum. HMAS Nirimba, operational from 1953 to 1994, played a crucial role in technical training for naval apprentices and aircraft maintenance.

== French Navy ==
Active naval air stations of the French naval air arm (status 2012). Two others were deactivated in 2011.

In 2017, the French Naval Aviation has four naval air stations (BAN), all located in metropolitan territory.

=== Bases d'aéronautique navale ===
- BAN Lann-Bihoué (mainly dedicated to maritime patrol)
- BAN Lanvéoc-Poulmic (mainly dedicated to helicopters)
- BAN Landivisiau (mainly dedicated to carrier fighters)
- BAN Hyères Le Palyvestre, (mainly dedicated to carrier fighters)

=== Location ===
In 2011, the BAN Tontouta was reassigned the French Air Force; the BAN Nîmes-Garons is now assigned primarily to the civil aviation (air transport) and on a secondary basis to the Ministry of Interior for Civil Security.

== Royal Navy ==
The United Kingdom has two active Royal Naval Air Stations (RNAS), RNAS Yeovilton (HMS Heron) and RNAS Culdrose (HMS Seahawk). It has a forward operating base HMS Gannet and there are also two satellite airfields RNAS Merryfield and Predannack Airfield.

Until 2006, RNAS Yeovilton served as the main operating base for the Royal Navy's Sea Harrier, which operated from the three Invincible-class aircraft carriers. However, upon the withdrawal of the aircraft in that year, no strike aircraft have since operated from there. Their successors, the F-35B Lightning II, are based at RAF Marham. RNAS Yeovilton is currently home to Wildcat Maritime Force (WMF); Commando Helicopter Force (CHF); Joint Aviation Command; Wildcat Demo Team, operating with Wildcat AH1 and HMA2 and Merlin HC4/4A respectively; 727 Naval Air Squadron - Flight grading and assessment. The site also contains the Fleet Air Arm Museum, which showcases a variety of naval aircraft from the Royal Naval Air Service (1914–1918) until the present day. RNAS Yeovilton also has RNAS Merryfield as its training and satellite station.

RNAS Culdrose serves a variety of helicopter and fixed-wing squadrons, operating with helicopters such as the Merlin HM2 and the Beechcraft Avenger T1 aircraft and is home to Maritime Merlin operations; Royal Naval School of Flight Deck Operations; 750 Naval Air Squadron - Observer and WSO training. Among the features at RNAS Culdrose is the "Dummy deck" which is used to train pilots to land on ships, the Merlin Training Facility, and the Naval Flying Standards Flight (Rotary Wing). Its satellite airfield is Predannack Airfield.

== Italian Navy ==
The Italy has three Marina Militare NAS: MARISTAELI Catania, MARISTAELI La Spezia Luni and MARISTAER Grottaglie.

== United States Navy ==
In the United States, a "Naval Air Station" (NAS) is an air base of the United States Navy. When located in foreign countries, they are more specifically named US Naval Air Stations (USNAS), to avoid confusion with naval air stations used by the navies of the host countries.

A slightly lower level of air base in the U.S. Navy is the Naval Air Facility. These facilities normally support smaller numbers of aeronaval aircraft. Permanently based naval aircraft are usually minimal, with the principal focus being on supporting naval aircraft deployed from other installations. Examples are NAF Atsugi, Japan; NAF Diego Garcia, British Indian Ocean Territory; NAF El Centro, California; NAF Washington at Andrews AFB, Maryland; NAF Souda Bay, Crete; NAF Misawa at the U.S. Air Force's Misawa AB in Japan; and NAF Mildenhall at the U.S. Air Force's RAF Mildenhall installation in the United Kingdom. Base Realignment and Closure (BRAC) actions have resulted in closure of Naval Air Facilities such as NAF Detroit at Selfridge ANGB, Michigan; NAF Lajes at the U.S. Air Force's Lajes AB facility in the Azores; NAF Kadena at the U.S. Air Force's Kadena AB, Japan; NAF Adak, Alaska; and NAF Midway northwest of Hawaii.

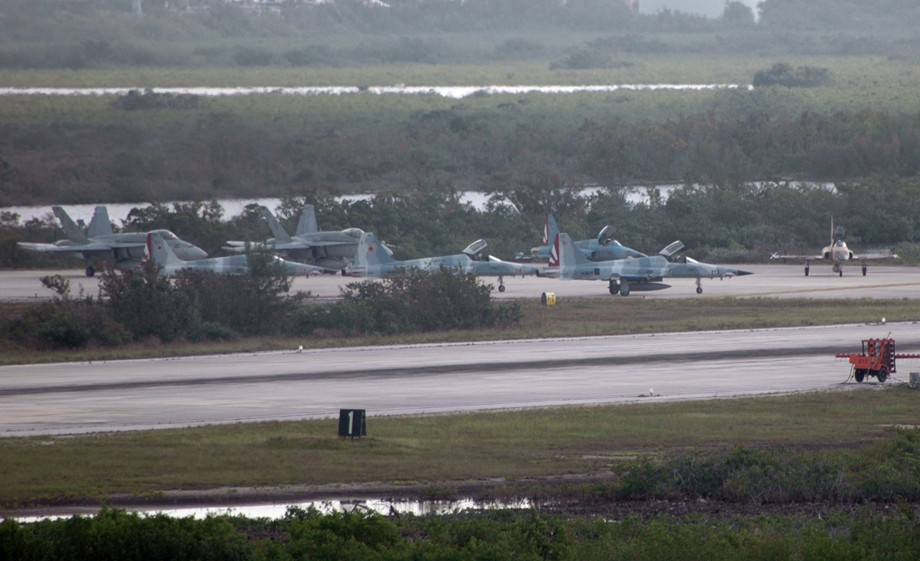
Flight line at NAS Key West, 2007

There are also a number of former Naval Air Stations that have been realigned as part of larger Naval Stations (NAVSTA) or redesignated to other functions in the Navy. This includes the former NAS Norfolk, Virginia (now part of NAVSTA Norfolk), the former NAF Mayport, Florida (now part of NAVSTA Mayport), the former NAS Guantanamo Bay, Cuba (now part of Guantanamo Bay Naval Base); and the former NAS Lakehurst, New Jersey (redesignated as Naval Air Engineering Station Lakehurst). In the case of NAS Memphis, Tennessee (redesignated as Naval Support Activity Mid-South), the airfield and flight line was turned over to local civilian authorities, while the Navy retained the remainder of the installation.

There are also larger facilities that are similar to Naval Air Stations and possess large airfield facilities, but were actually constructed as part of much larger facilities or were dedicated to research and development activities. This includes NAVSTA Rota, Spain; the NAVSTA Roosevelt Roads, Puerto Rico; the still active Naval Air Weapons Station (NAWS) China Lake, California; and the recently closed Naval Air Warfare Center Warminster, Pennsylvania.

The Navy also operates a number of austere unstaffed or minimally staffed airfields known as Naval Auxiliary Landing Fields (NALF), Naval Outlying Landing Fields (NOLF), or more simply Outlying Fields (OLF).

== United States Marine Corps ==
In the United States, a "Marine Corps Air Station" is an air base of the United States Marine Corps. When located in foreign countries, they are often identified as US Marine Corps Air Stations (USMCAS), following their US Navy counterparts (the Marine Corps falling as a service under the Department of the Navy) as that term is used by the navies of other countries.

As part of Naval Aviation, Marine Corps Air Stations and Marine Corps Air Facilities fill a similar role as Naval Air Stations and Naval Air Facilities for the United States Marine Corps. Marine aviation units are also assigned on occasion as permanently based units to Naval Air Stations, Naval Air Facilities and, in rare cases, to Air Force Bases and Air National Guard Bases as well.

Like the Navy, the Marine Corps also operates a number of austere unstaffed or minimally staffed airfields known as Marine Corps Auxiliary Landing Fields (MCALF), Marine Corps Outlying Landing Fields (MCOLF), or more simply Outlying Fields (OLF). Since the Marines' flight training is combined with the Navy and the Coast Guard, those fields dedicated to training of student aviators in the southeastern United States remain under Navy control. As a result, the Marine Corps' auxiliary fields support operational Fleet Marine Force (FMF) units for readiness purposes, such as field carrier landing practice (FCLP) for fixed-wing and rotary-wing aircraft embarking on aircraft carriers or amphibious assault ships.

== United States Coast Guard ==
The United States Coast Guard is also part of U.S. Naval Aviation and operates its own Coast Guard Air Stations and Coast Guard Air Facilities, either as stand alone installations on joint civil-military airports or Coast Guard-controlled facilities, or collocated at Naval Air Stations, Air Force Bases, Air National Guard Bases and Army Air Fields. Since the Coast Guard has no aviation facilities located in foreign countries, the service tends not use the term "U.S. Coast Guard Air Station" (USCGAS), but will use the term Coast Guard Air Station (CGAS) or more simply, "AIRSTA." The Coast Guard also operates a number of smaller Coast Guard Air Facilities, most of which are limited to rotary-wing operations only and support a limited number of aircraft and personnel.

== See also ==
- Lists of military installations
- Naval air squadron (also abbreviated NAS)
- NAWS, Naval Air Weapons Station China Lake, California, United States
- Naval outlying landing field
