= Loeu =

Loeu may refer to:

- Khmer Loeu, the collective name given to the indigenous ethnic groups in the highlands of Cambodia
- Lynx OEU, an independent unit within the British Royal Navy's Lynx Helicopter Force

== See also ==
- Loyew, a town in the province of Homiel, Belarus
