= 825 Naval Air Squadron =

Flying squadron of the Royal Navy's Fleet Air Arm

- Squadron badge
- Active: Royal Air Force; 1934–1939; Royal Navy: 1939–1945; 1946–1951; 1961–1962; 1982; 2014–present
- Country: United Kingdom
- Branch: Royal Navy
- Type: Torpedo Bomber Reconnaissance squadron
- Role: Wildcat HMA2 crew training in: anti-submarine warfare (ASW); anti-surface warfare (ASuW)
- Part of: Fleet Air Arm
- Home station: RNAS Yeovilton
- Motto: Nihil Obstat (Latin for 'Nothing Stops Us')
- Aircraft: AgustaWestland Wildcat HMA2
- Website: Official website

Commanders
- Current commander: Commander Sammy Haynes

825 Naval Air Squadron (825 NAS), also referred to as 825 Squadron, is a Fleet Air Arm (FAA) naval air squadron of the United Kingdom’s Royal Navy (RN), which was re-commissioned on 10 October 2014 and currently flies the AgustaWestland Wildcat HMA2. Located at RNAS Yeovilton, this unit is a component of the Wildcat Maritime Force and is tasked with the training of all Royal Navy Wildcat Helicopter Engineers. Additionally, it serves as the Operational Conversion Unit, supplying Aircrew to operate the Wildcat Helicopter Maritime Attack (HMA) Mk2 alongside 815 Naval Air Squadron in frontline operations.

It was a carrier-based squadron that was formed on 8 October 1934 from the aircraft and personnel of 824 Naval Air Squadron. It operated in most of the theatres of the Second World War, carrying out a number of attacks on prominent German warships, including the battleship Bismarck in the Atlantic and the pocket battleships Scharnhorst and Gneisenau and heavy cruiser Prinz Eugen during their Channel Dash. The squadron also saw action in later conflicts, including the Korean War and the Falklands War.

== History ==
=== Pre-war history ===
825 Squadron's first assignment after commissioning was to board the aircraft carrier HMS Eagle for service on the China Station. This was short-lived, and by January 1935 both the squadron and the carrier were in the Mediterranean. The squadron was transferred to Hal Far, Malta in March, while Eagle returned to Britain for a refit. HMS Glorious replaced Eagle, and the squadron alternated its time between the carrier and the aerodrome at Hal Far. They returned briefly to the UK in May 1937 to attend the Coronation Fleet Review, before retaking their station in the Mediterranean, and were transferred to Admiralty control on 24 May 1939.

=== Wartime service ===
==== Mediterranean and the North Sea ====
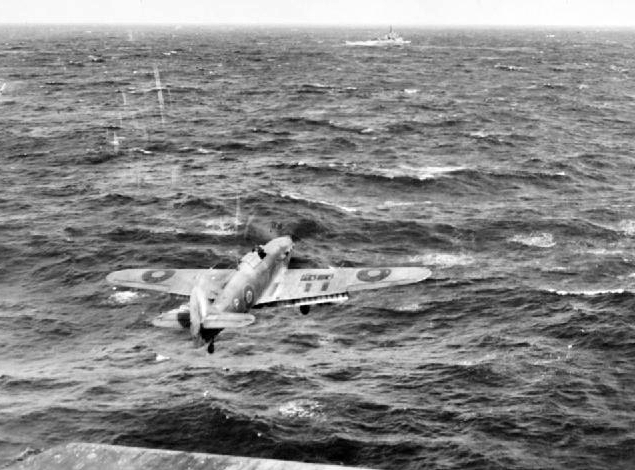
A Hawker Sea Hurricane of 825 Squadron takes off from the flight deck of the escort carrier HMS Vindex during an Atlantic convoy. One of the carrier's escort vessels can be seen ahead.

With the outbreak of the Second World War in September 1939, 825 Squadron embarked on HMS Glorious at Dekheila, Egypt and headed into the Indian Ocean and the Red Sea to search for enemy shipping. They carried out these duties throughout the rest of 1939, returning the Mediterranean in January 1940, where they again returned to Hal Far. The squadron re-embarked on Glorious in March and sailed to Britain to defend Norway after the German invasion. On their arrival, they disembarked at RNAS Prestwick. With the sinking of HMS Glorious by the German battleships Scharnhorst and Gneisenau on 8 June 1940, the squadron was transferred to operate from Worthy Down, Detling and Thorney Island, covering allied forces in France and the Low Countries as the German forces advanced. They were active in covering the Dunkirk evacuation, during which they lost eight of their 12 aircraft; five were lost in a single bombing raid on 29 May 1940, including its commander Jimmy Buckley who was awarded the DSC for his actions during this period.

==== Atlantic and the Bismarck ====
The depleted squadron was brought up to nine aircraft in July 1940 and embarked aboard HMS Furious. They then operated off the Norwegian coast in September, carrying out night attacks on Trondheim and Tromsø. After the British withdrawal, the squadron remained aboard Furious, and by February 1941 was off the Gold Coast. They joined HMS Victorious in May 1941, and took part in the Home Fleet's hunt for the battleship Bismarck. After sighting Bismarck on 24 May, aircraft from the squadron carried out an attack on 25 May, scoring a single hit which slowed her. Another series of attacks by Fairey Swordfish of 810 and 818 Naval Air Squadrons flying from HMS Ark Royal the following day succeeded in disabling Bismarck's steering gear. She was subsequently engaged by ships of the Home Fleet and sank on 27 May.

==== The Channel Dash ====
The squadron embarked on Ark Royal in June 1941 to provide cover for the Malta Convoys. Aircraft of 825 Squadron carried out raids on targets in Pantellaria, Sardinia and Sicily in September. A number of the squadron's aircraft were lost in the sinking of Ark Royal on 14 October. The remainder flew to Gibraltar, where the squadron was disbanded. It was re-formed with Fairey Swordfish at RNAS Lee-on-Solent in January 1942, and tasked with a torpedo bomber reconnaissance duties. Six of the squadron's aircraft flew off from RAF Manston to attack Scharnhorst and Gneisenau and the heavy cruiser Prinz Eugen in the English Channel, as they carried out Operation Cerberus. The attacking aircraft failed to score any hits, and all six were lost. The Commanding Officer—Eugene Esmonde—was posthumously awarded the Victoria Cross. Five of the aircrew survived, and were also decorated.

==== Arctic and Atlantic convoys ====
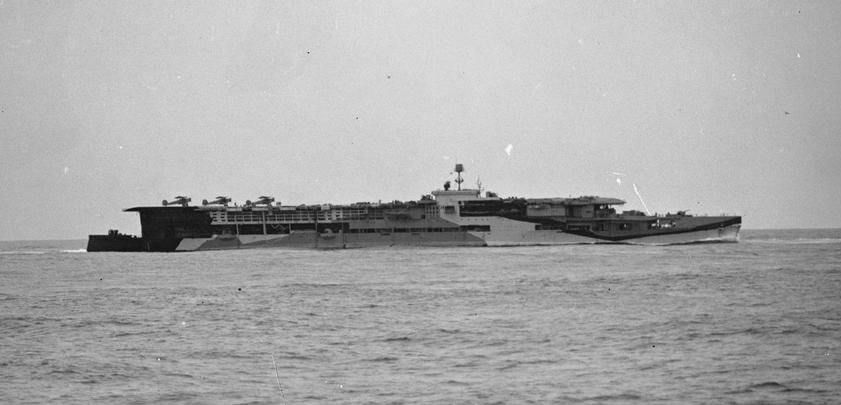
Fairey Swordfish of No 825 Squadron on board HMS Furious in northern waters.

After regrouping at Lee-on-Solent in March 1942, the squadron sent three aircraft aboard HMS Avenger where they covered the Arctic convoys to Russia. They attacked six U-boats, and shared credit with the destroyer HMS Onslow for sinking U-589. The squadron then operated under No. 16 Group RAF Coastal Command, flying out of Thorney Island and Exeter.

They then embarked aboard HMS Furious in March 1943, covering convoys sailing to Iceland and making sweeps for enemy submarines off Norway. They transferred to HMS Vindex with six Sea Hurricane IICs, and later another three Fulmar IIs to cover the Atlantic convoys. Aircraft from the squadron sank U-653 on 15 March 1944 and U-765 on 6 May 1944. 825 Squadron was re-equipped with 12 Swordfish IIIs in August and sailed with Vindex to cover the Arctic convoys. They sank U-354 on 22 August 1944, while the squadron's Sea Hurricanes damaged another and claimed another as a possible kill that same day. U-344 was sunk jointly with the Fleet on 24 August, and U-394 was sunk on 2 September. The squadron transferred to HMS Campania in March 1945, where the Sea Hurricanes were replaced by eight Wildcat VIs. They continued in the Arctic before returning to Britain. The Swordfish were then absorbed into 815 Naval Air Squadron, followed by the Wildcats in May. 825 Squadron then ceased to exist. 825 Squadron was reformed in July 1945 at RNAS Rattray as a Canadian-manned force. It was intended that it would consist of 12 Barracuda IIs, and form part of the 19th Carrier Air Group aboard a Colossus-class aircraft carrier. This did not happen immediately, and the squadron remained a Royal Navy one.

=== Post-war service ===
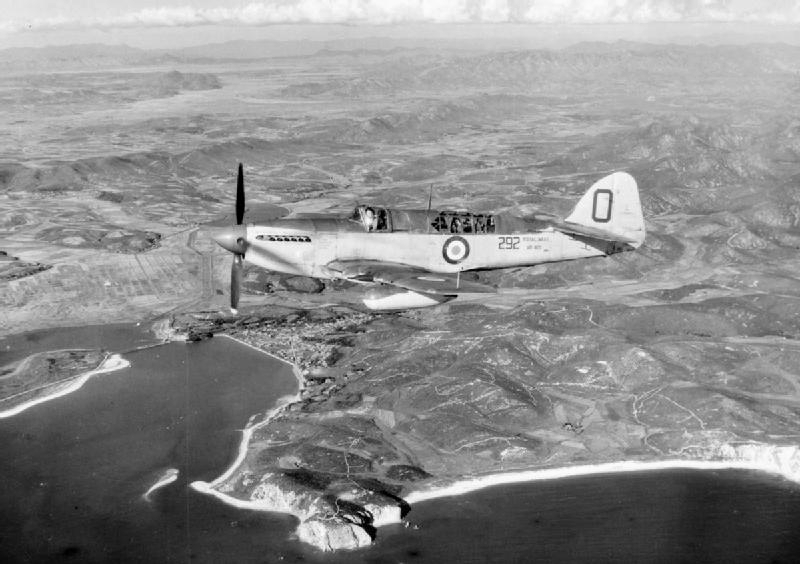
A Fairey Firefly off the eastern coast of South Korea, 1952

The commissioning of HMCS Warrior in January 1946 led to the transferral of the squadron to the Royal Canadian Navy. It served with them until being renumbered 880 Squadron (RCN) in May 1951. The 825 designation then returned to the Royal Navy, and the squadron reformed in June 1951 at RNAS Eglinton. The squadron was recommissioned several times over the next decade, operating as an anti-submarine unit equipped with Fairey Gannets, and seeing service in the Korean War. During this period, they spent time operating off HMS Ocean. It then re-formed at RNAS Culdrose on 16 August 1960, equipped with Whirlwind HAS.7s. The squadron was deployed in the Middle East during crises between Iraq and Kuwait in 1961. It then transferred most of its aircraft to 824 Squadron, returning to the UK aboard HMS Victorious. In late 1961 they took part in relief operations after Mombasa was hit by flooding. They were again disbanded on 2 April 1962.

The outbreak of the Falklands War in 1982 led to the re-forming of the squadron on 3 May 1982 equipped with Sea King HAS.2/2As. The aircraft came from 706 Naval Air Squadron, or were taken from other units or storage. Eight Sea Kings sailed for the Falklands on 12 May, aboard the Atlantic Causeway, with another two sailing the following day aboard Queen Elizabeth 2. The squadron operated from Port San Carlos and then the Landing Site (LS) "Busby" at San Carlos Settlement where they were billeted with the local farmer. They returned to the UK in late July. They were disbanded at Culdrose on 17 September 1982.

== Current formation ==
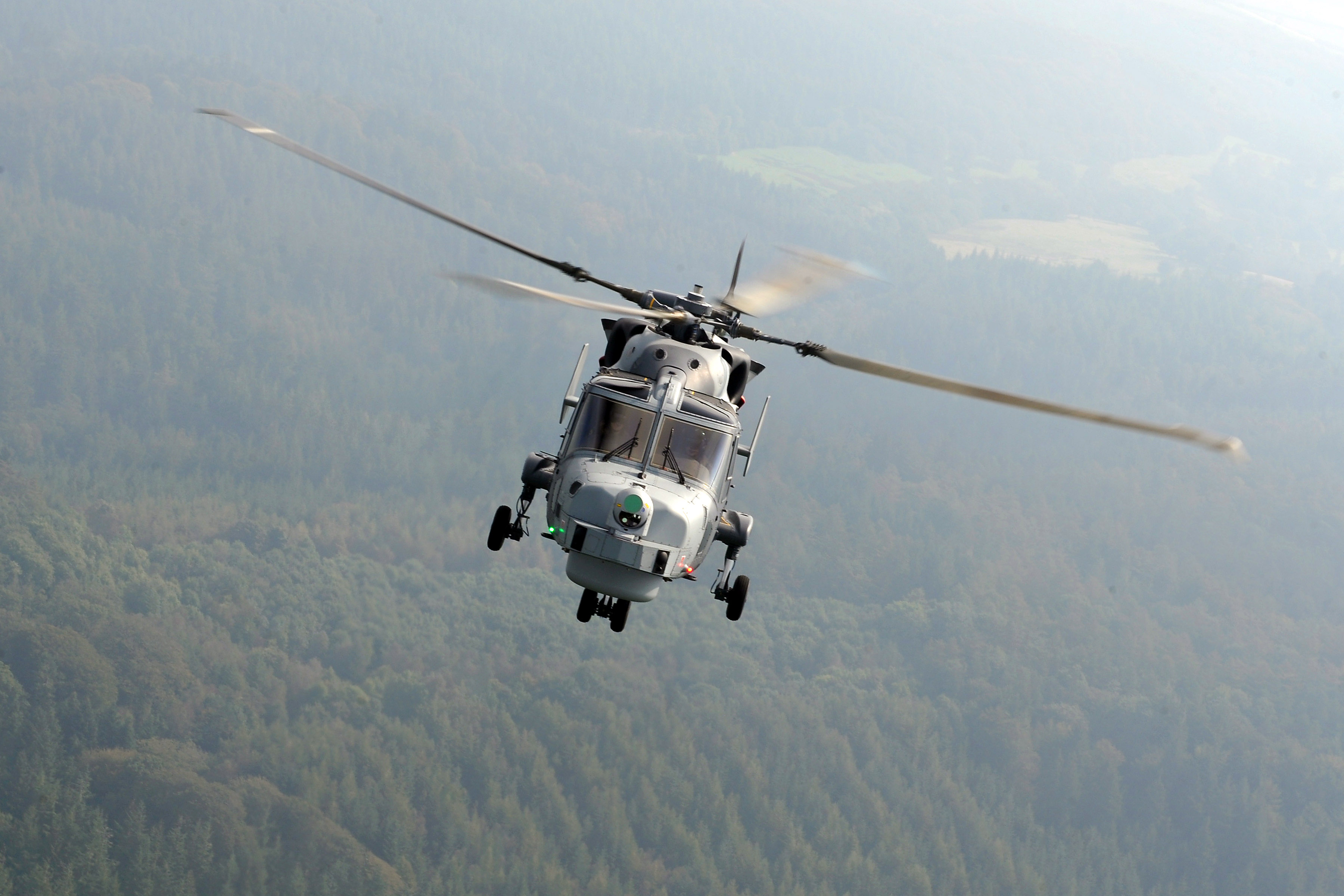
An 825 NAS Wildcat in flight over the UK

825 Naval Air Squadron is currently the Royal Navy’s Operational Conversion Unit for Wildcat after being re-commissioned as the Royal Navy's first frontline Wildcat HMA2 Squadron on 10 October 2014, with the merger of 700(W) Naval Air Squadron and 702 Naval Air Squadron. It operated the first four Wildcat Flights to convert and deploy to sea on Type 45 destroyers and Type 23 frigates. It delivers training to aircrew along with Air Engineers awaiting frontline qualification and is responsible for continuing Wildcat Tactical Development: identifying and understanding the significant potential of the aircraft.

=== Flights ===
- 201 Flight (Wildcat HMA.2) – Voodoo – aboard HMS Lancaster between March 2015 and December 2015.
- 209 Flight (Wildcat HMA.2) between April and October 2016.

== Aircraft operated ==
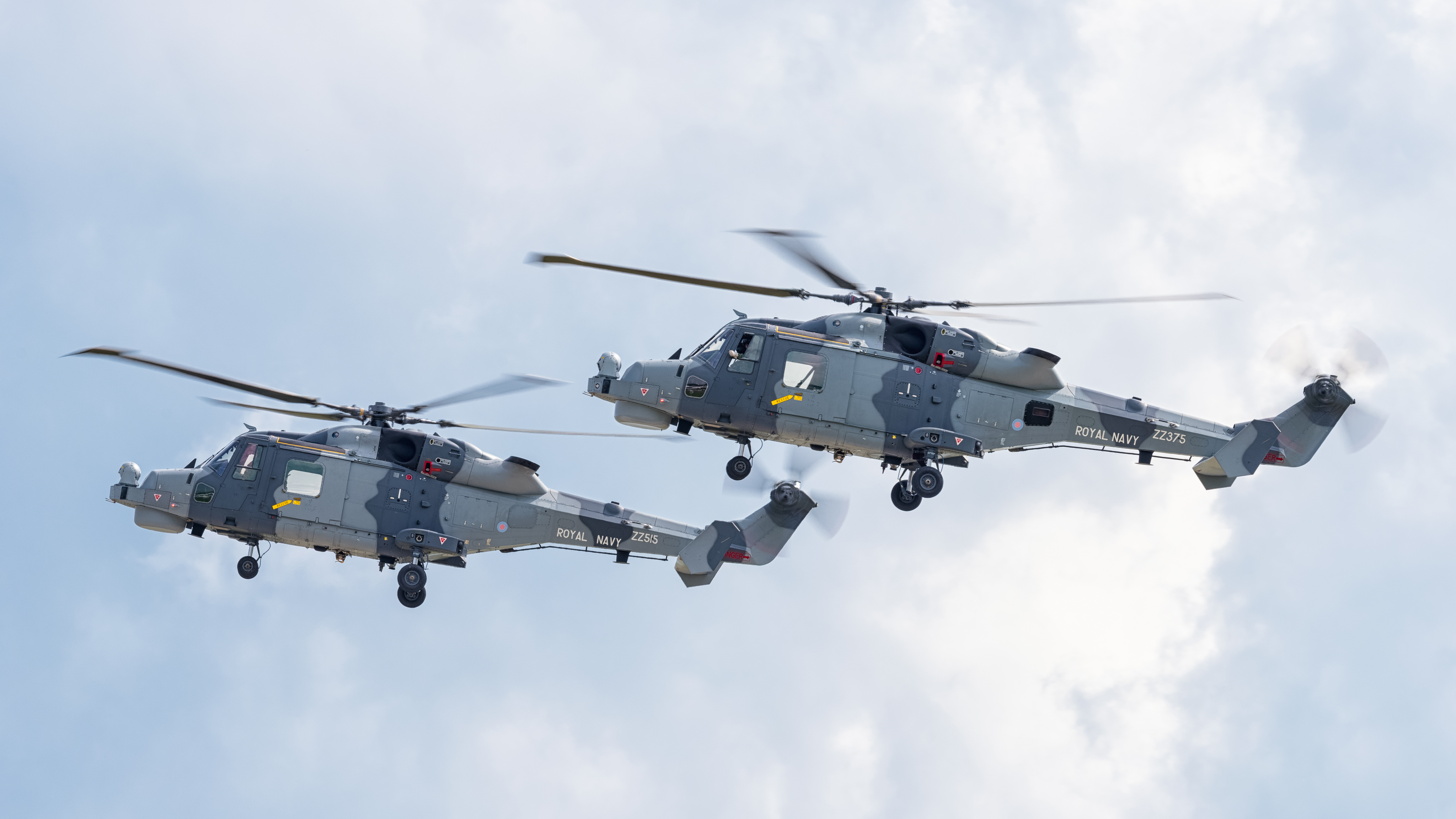
Two AW159 Wildcat HMA.2 flying at ILA 2016 forming the "Black Cats" display team within the 825 Naval Air Squadron.

The squadron operated a variety of different aircraft and versions:

- Fairey III F
- Fairey Swordfish I, II & III
- Hawker Sea Hurricane IIc
- Grumman Wildcat VI
- Fairey Barracuda II(ASH)
- Fairey Firefly FR.1, FR.4, AS.5 & FR.5
- Fairey Gannet AS.1, T.2 & AS.4
- Westland Whirlwind HAS.7
- Westland Sea King HAS.2/2a
- AgustaWestland Wildcat HMA2

== Battle honours ==
825 Naval Air Squadron has received the following battle honours:

- Dunkirk 1940
- English Channel 1940–42
- Norway 1940
- Bismarck 1941
- Malta Convoys 1941
- Arctic 1942–45
- Atlantic 1944
- Japan 1945
- Korea 1952
- Falkland Islands 1982

== Commanding Officers ==
- Commander Simon Collins, RN, 2014-2018
- Commander Duncan Thomas, RN 2018-2020
- Commander Scott Simpson, RN 2020 - 2021
- Commander Hugh Saltonstall, RN 2021 - 2023
- Commander Ben Dando, RN 2023 - 2025
- Commander Sammy Haynes, RN, 2025 - present

== See also ==
- Falklands War order of battle: British naval forces
- Royal Navy and Fleet Air Arm aerobatic teams
