= Lynx OEU =

The Lynx Operational Evaluation Unit (LOEU) was an independent unit within the Royal Navy’s Lynx Helicopter Force (LHF). It was charged with Operational Evaluation, Trials, Training and provision of Subject Matter Experts (SMEs) for new equipment projects and service modifications entering service within the Lynx Helicopter Force.

The Lynx OEU has gone through many changes in structure and command and control during its existence. It has been part of 815 Naval Air Squadron, 702 Naval Air Squadron, an independent unit, and has been badged as 700(L) Squadron during the introduction to service of the Westland Lynx HAS 2/3 and Lynx HMA 8.

The Lynx Helicopter Force (LHF) was formed from the Lynx OEU at RNAS Yeovilton (HMS Heron) and 700W Naval Air Squadron in May 2009. Then in July 2012 the LHF was renamed the Lynx Wildcat Maritime Force (LWMF).

== Trials and Evaluation ==
Commanded by a trained Test Pilot, with an Aerosystems trained Observer as Executive Officer, both previously assigned to MoD Boscombe Down, the unit was well placed to act as the centre of excellence for trials activity within the LHF.

It had conducted trials include live guided missile firings (Lynx Mk8 S), operational evaluation of defensive aids suites (Lynx Mk8 DSP) and assessment of new NVG compatible landing lamps (Lynx Mk3). In addition the unit was providing SMEs to the SCMR / Future Lynx (FLynx) programme as part of the LHF SCMR Fielding Team's involvement in the FLynx Combined Test Team. Such activity involves close liaison with many external agencies, such as the MOD's Lynx Integrated Project Team, AgustaWestland and Boscombe Down (Mission Systems and Rotary Wing Test Squadron).

== Training ==
The LOEU was the primary trials and training unit for the Lynx HMA Mk8 Saturn and associated Combined Modifications Programme (CMP). Having created a bespoke training course, it was converting operational Lynx Mk8 crews onto the latest equipment and software standard.

== Aircraft ==
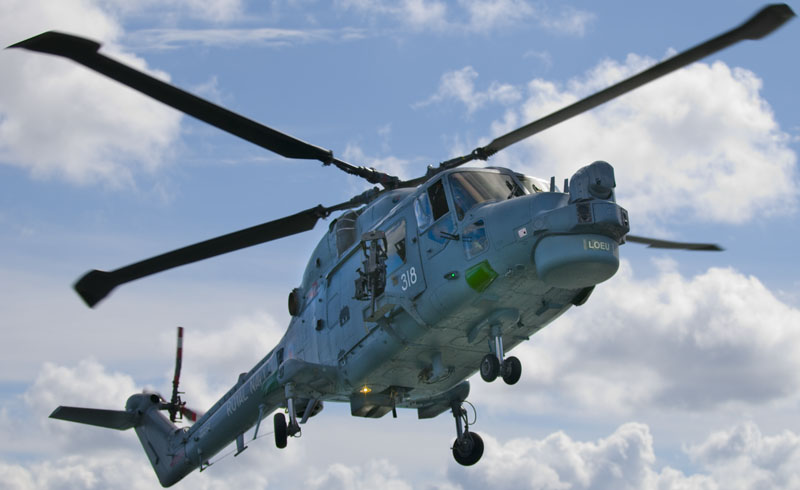
LOEU Westland Lynx

The LOEU had operated 4 Westland Lynx HMA 8 Saturn / CMP, but was allotted other marks as required for trials activity.

The final Westland Lynx HMA 8 left service on 23 March 2017. On 17 March, a final flypast was conducted by four Royal Navy Westland Lynx HMA 8 helicopters from 815 Naval Air Squadron, based at RNAS Yeovilton in Somerset.
