= Blue Eagles =

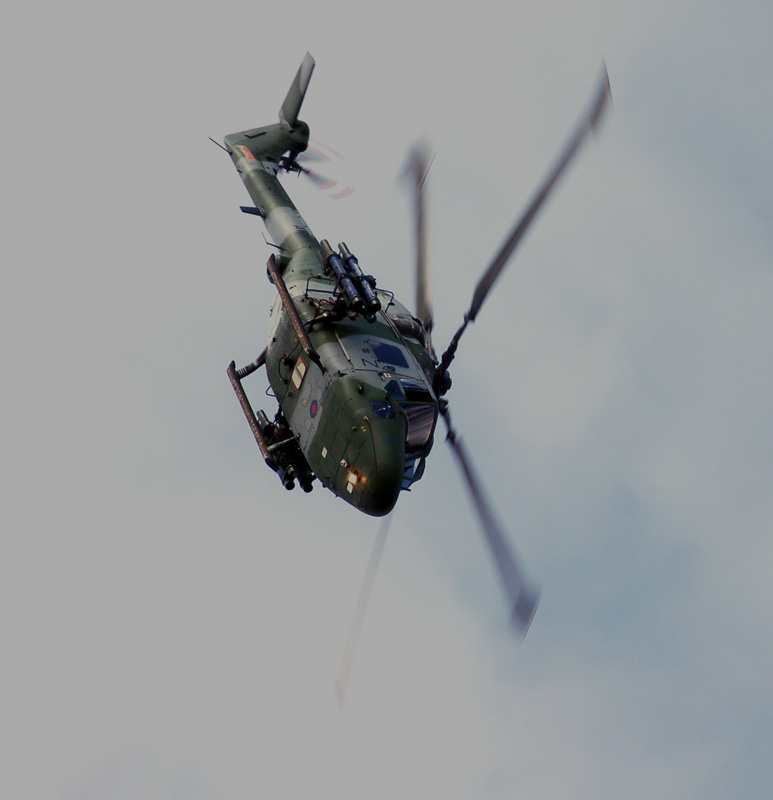
- A Blue Eagles Lynx
- Active: 1968–2010
- Country: United Kingdom
- Branch: Army Air Corps
- Size: 9 Officers/NCOs (pilots)
- Garrison/HQ: School of Army Aviation; AAC Middle Wallop; Hampshire, England
- Patron: British Army Air Corps, volunteer
- Motto(s): ARTE CONIUNCTI VOLAMUS (Joined together flying)
- Colors: Standard army colouring

Aircraft flown
- Helicopter: 4 Aérospatiale Gazelle; 1 Westland Lynx; 1 Westland Apache; 1 Sud Aviation Alouette; 1 Westland Scout

The Blue Eagles were the helicopter aerobatic team of the British Army Air Corps. It was one of only eight professional helicopter teams in the world, along with the Royal Navy Black Cats, Sarang of the Indian Air Force, the Scorpion aerobatic team of the Polish Air Force, Rotores de Portugal, the Patrulla Aspa of the Spanish Air Force, the Grasshoppers of the RNLAF and the US Army Silver Eagles. They were formed in the spring of 1968 by Air Corps instructors, and were established in the following years with five helicopters. In 2001, the team included the first British female military display pilot. In 2010, it was disbanded due to an ageing Westland Lynx fleet and financial cutbacks.

== History ==
The Blue Eagles were formed in the spring of 1968 by instructors at the British Army Air Corps centred at Middle Wallop who practised in their spare time. One year later the team was permanently established with five Bell-47G3B1 Sioux AH1 helicopters. Despite no official formation flying training from the army, the team achieved growing success and by 1974 they were including venues as far apart as the Channel Islands, Scotland and Germany. Nonetheless, the Army could not afford to maintain the Blue Eagles on a full-time basis and the team disbanded. Enthusiastic pilots at Middle Wallop were left to continue the team on their own time, and they kept the team and expertise alive. The team performed under a variety of names including the Eagles, Army Eagles, and Sparrow-hawks.

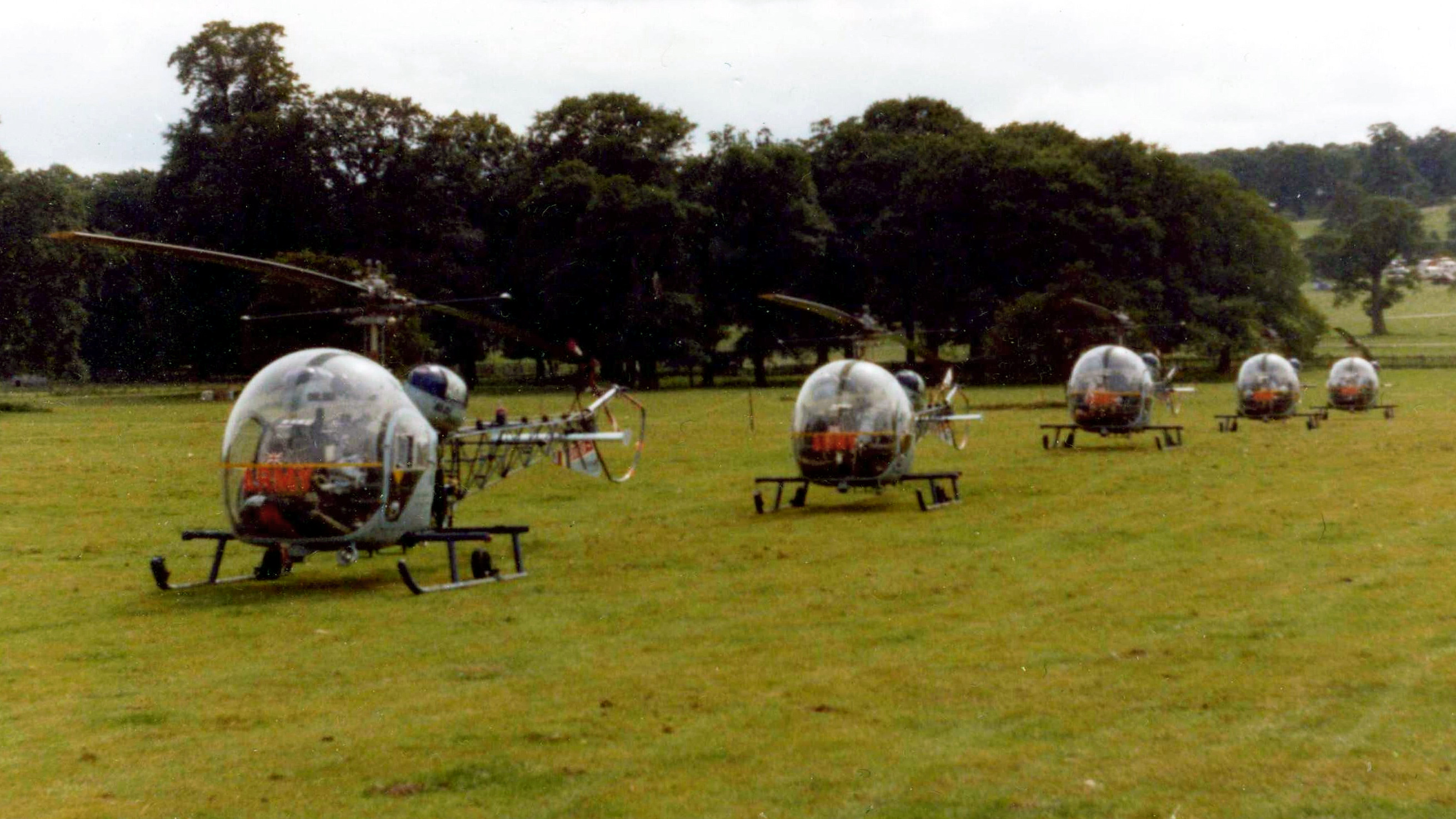
The team in 1975

In 1982 the team officially reformed as the Silver Eagles for the year of the Army Air Corps' 25th anniversary with six brand new Lynx AH1 flown by instructors from Lynx Conversion Flight at Middle Wallop. The Silver Eagles incorporated an AAC Beaver and occasionally Westland's G-LYNX into their displays for the seventh solo slot. The aircraft were in standard camouflage with a large Silver Eagles roundel, designed by aviation artist by Wilf Hardy, on each side of the nose. The team disbanded at the end of the AAC Jubilee year.

1992 saw the Eagles equipped with four Lynx helicopters which amazed crowds with their unprecedented versatility and power. However the Army needed Lynx helicopters elsewhere and could not justify the expensive flying time for an unofficial team. Thus the team adopted a configuration of four Gazelles and one Lynx in 1993. The team experienced a strong resurgence and won the prestigious Wilkinson Sword at the Royal International Air Tattoo. Following this success the team was allowed to return to the Blue Eagles moniker in 1994, though the team was still composed entirely of volunteers.

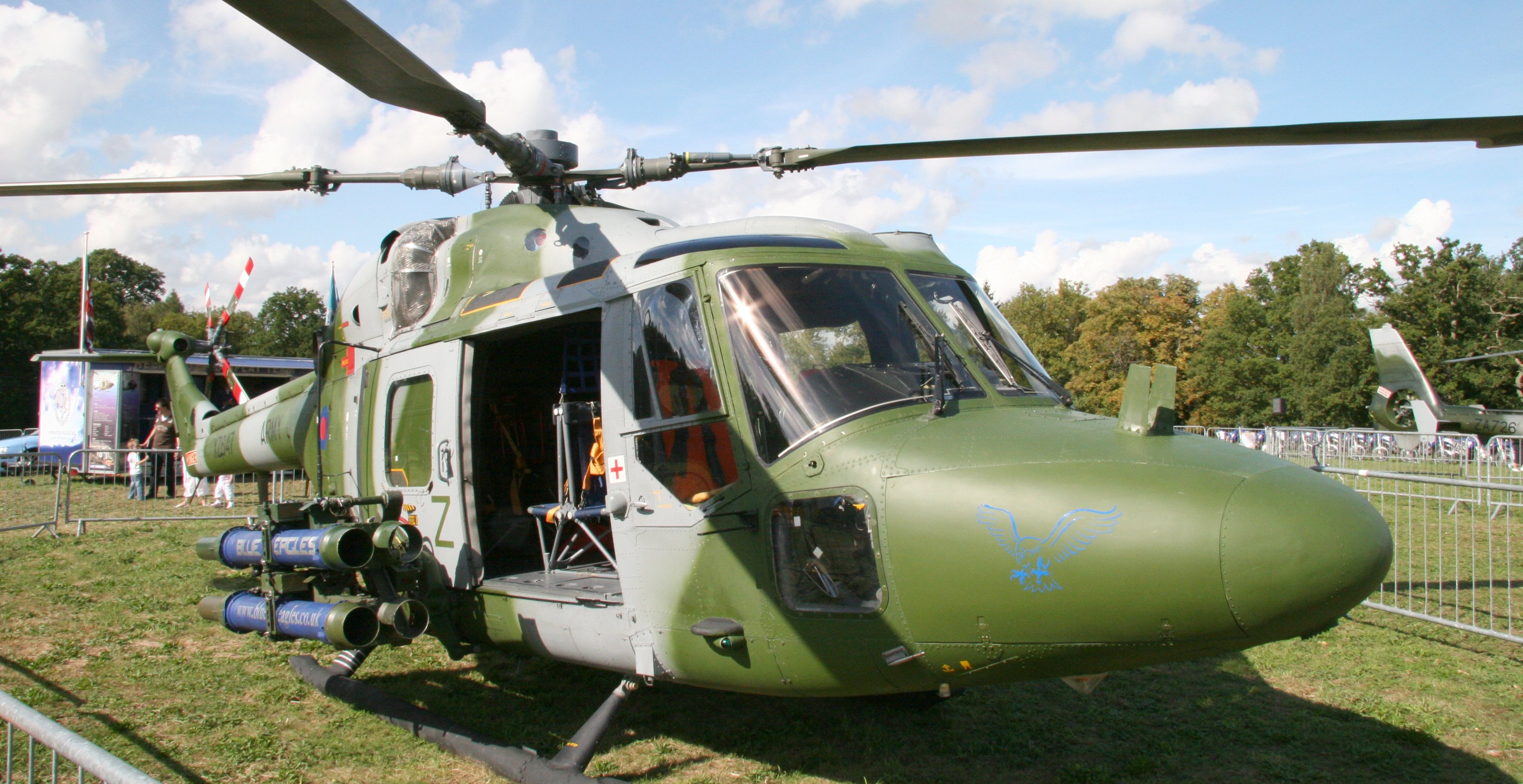
The Team Lynx, XZ647, showing the Blue Eagles logo on the nose.

In 2001, the team included the very first British female military display pilot, Sgt Julie Wiles.

The team continued to fly out of Middle Wallop and its repertoire included formation flying, loops, rolls, breaks, and many other standard aerobatic maneuvers until the team was disbanded in 2010, due to financial considerations and an ageing Lynx fleet. It was succeeded in its role by the Solo Apache Display team.

== See also ==
- Red Arrows, the world-famous Royal Air Force fixed wing (plane) display team.
- Silver Eagles, the United States Army helicopter display team from 1972-1976.
- Black Cats, Royal Navy helicopter display team.
- Sarang, Indian Air Force helicopter display team
- Rotores de Portugal, Portuguese Air Force helicopter display team
