= Wildcat Maritime Force =

Element of the Royal Navy Fleet Air Arm

- Crest of Wildcat Maritime Force
- Active: 2001 – present
- Country: United Kingdom
- Branch: Royal Navy
- Type: Force headquarters
- Role: Deployment of Wildcat Maritime Attack Helicopter
- Size: 28 Helicopters; 400 personnel
- Part of: Fleet Air Arm
- Home station: RNAS Yeovilton (HMS Heron)

Commanders
- Current commander: Commander A.G. Henderson, RN

Aircraft flown
- Attack helicopter: Westland Lynx HAS3, HMA8; AgustaWestland Wildcat HMA2

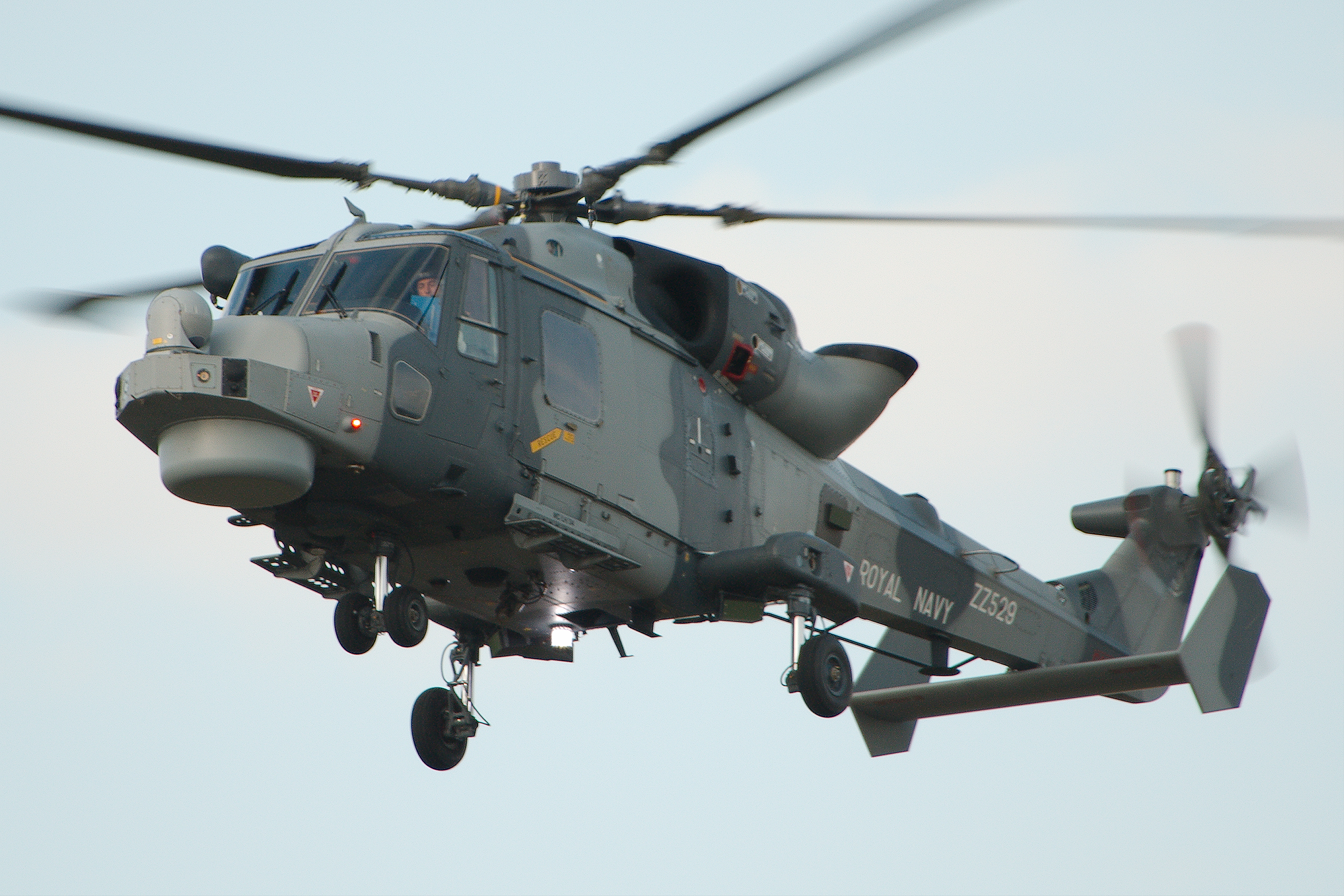
Wildcat HMA2 at RIAT 2019

Wildcat Maritime Force (WMF) is a unit of the Royal Navy's Fleet Air Arm. Its primary role is to deploy the AgustaWestland Wildcat HMA2, a battlefield utility, search and rescue, aerial reconnaissance, anti-submarine warfare (ASW), anti-surface warfare (ASuW) and troop transport helicopter, to the frontline. Wildcat Maritime Force is formed of two squadrons, both based at Royal Naval Air Station Yeovilton (HMS Heron) in Somerset, England, 815 Naval Air Squadron for frontline operations and 825 Naval Air Squadron for engineer training and aircrew conversion.

== History ==
=== Lynx Helicopter Force (LHF) ===
The Wildcat Maritime Force's origins come from the Lynx Helicopter Force (LHF), which was a previous Royal Navy Fleet Air Arm unit set up around the operational deployment for the Westland Lynx, a British multi-purpose twin-engined military helicopter. It was formed at RNAS Yeovilton (HMS Heron) on 12 June 2001 with 702 Naval Air Squadron, which operated as a training squadron. It trained all ground and aircrew for the front line maritime Westland Lynx unit, 815 Naval Air Squadron. Consisting of around 160 experienced personnel, it provided more than a dozen aircrew and in excess of 100 maintainers. The squadron also provided refresher flying courses and was also the home of the Black Cats, the Royal Navy's official helicopter aerobatics team.

Joining 702 NAS was 815 Naval Air Squadron and Flights, and the Lynx Operational Evaluation Unit (OEU), the latter had formed from the absorption of 700L Naval Air Squadron into 815 NAS, and which had later become and independent unit, and the squadron became one of the largest helicopter squadrons in Europe. The Lynx flights were typically deployed to the Royal Navy's Type 42 or Type 45 destroyers and the Type 23 frigates, and the ice patrol ship HMS Endurance. On average, an 815 Naval Air Squadron Westland Lynx helicopter deployed for six or more months along with a dedicated ship's flight of two aircrew (one pilot, one observer) and supported by seven maintainers and technicians.

700W Naval Air Squadron was part of LHF between May 2009 and July 2014. It reformed from the Lynx OEU at RNAS Yeovilton (HMS Heron) in May 2009, and was tasked, along with the manufacturers AgustaWestland and the QinetiQ Rotary Wing Test Squadron Boscombe Down, with assessing the AgustaWestland Wildcat HMA2. In May 2014 the initial ships's Flight was formed and following successful trials the 700W NAS disbanded on 30 July, becoming 825 Naval Air Squadron. The following day 702 Naval Air Squadron disbanded, being absorbed into 815 Naval Air Squadron.

=== Lynx Wildcat Maritime Force (LWMF) ===
From July 2012 the LHF was renamed the Lynx Wildcat Maritime Force (LWMF) and the following year it acquired and operated the Wildcat Simulator, it operated the Lynx Simulator up until March 2017. The reformed 825 Naval Air Squadron became the Wildcat squadron within the Lynx Wildcat Maritime Force. It was tasked with supporting single flights to deploy aboard the Royal Navy's Type 45 destroyers and Type 23 frigates, to continue with Wildcat tactical development work, and to act as the Wildcat Operational Conversion Unit (OCU).

815 Naval Air Squadron become the Royal Navy Fleet Air Arm sole operator of the Westland Lynx helicopter from July 2014, taking on the training of 702 Naval Air Squadron and the support for the twelve deployable single flights and two double crewed Maritime Counter Terrorism (MCT) Flights. From April 2016 the squadron began conversion to the AgustaWestland Wildcat. The final Westland Lynx HMA.8 left service in March 2017. On 17 March 2017, a final flypast was conducted by four Royal Navy Westland Lynx HMA 8 helicopters from 815 Naval Air Squadron, based at RNAS Yeovilton in Somerset.

=== Wildcat Maritime Force (WMF) ===
The unit was renamed Wildcat Maritime Force when the Westland Lynx was retired from service in March 2017. Continuing on from LHF and LWMF, the Wildcat Maritime Force (WMF) is based at RNAS Yeovilton (HMS Heron) and is responsible for deploying the AgustaWestland Wildcat HMA2 on operations. WMF comprises two Squadrons: a frontline Maritime Interdiction and Small Ship's Flights Squadron, 815 Naval Air Squadron, and a training and conversion Squadron, 825 Naval Air Squadron.

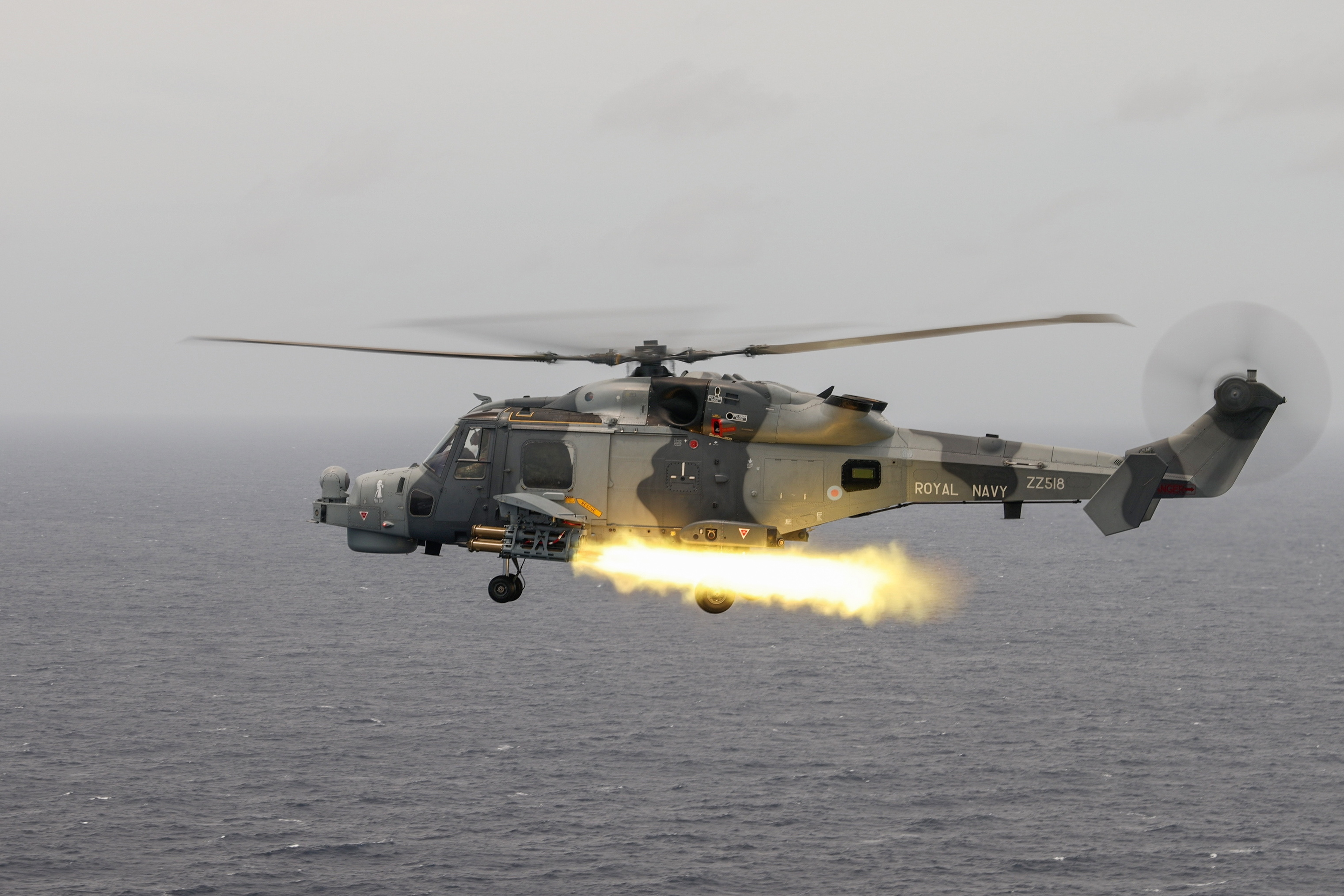
First operational Martlet missile in the Bay of Bengal as part of the Carrier Strike Group 21 Deployment. 815 NAS

The multi-role AgustaWestland Wildcat HMA2 is the latest helicopter in the Fleet Air Arm able to operate from frigates, destroyers and Royal Fleet Auxiliary vessels across anti-submarine warfare (ASW), anti-surface warfare (ASuW) and humanitarian and disaster relief (HADR). 815 Naval Air Squadron has a number of Flights deployed on ships in any one of the Royal Navy's or Royal Fleet Auxiliary's surface vessels, providing air support to the escort Fleet. WMF has introduced the new Martlet missile system, as part of the Future Anti-Surface Guided Weapon (FASGW) programme, and which initially deployed with the Carrier Strike Group 21 on its initial operational deployment.

825 Naval Air Squadron is responsible for the training of aircrew and engineers to fly, operate and maintain both the AgustaWestland Wildcat HMA2 as well as the AgustaWestland Wildcat AH1 (the Army Wildcat variant), under a scheme to asset share with other RNAS Yeovilton based Squadrons outside of WMF. Also situated at Yeovilton is the Wildcat Training Centre (WTC). This facility provides Technical and Simulation Training to both Royal Navy and Army AgustaWestland Wildcat Operators. The WTC is includes Civilian (AgustaWestland) staff, Royal Navy Aircrew Instructors and Army Tactical Instructors providing over sixty different courses with two Full Mission Simulators, two procedural (non-moving) simulators as well as two ‘airframes’ that are used to teach mechanical and avionic systems.

== Helicopters operated ==
Squadrons when part of Lynx Helicopter Force (LHF), Lynx Wildcat Maritime Force (LWMF) and Wildcat Maritime Force (WMF) have operated two different helicopter types and two variants of one:

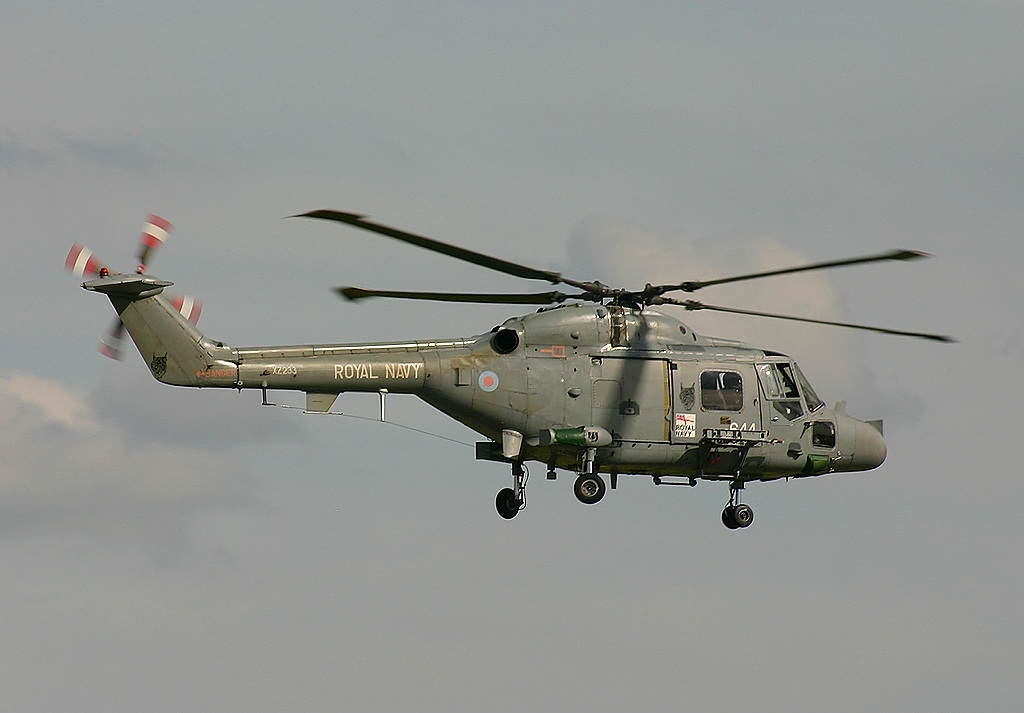
Westland Lynx HAS.3

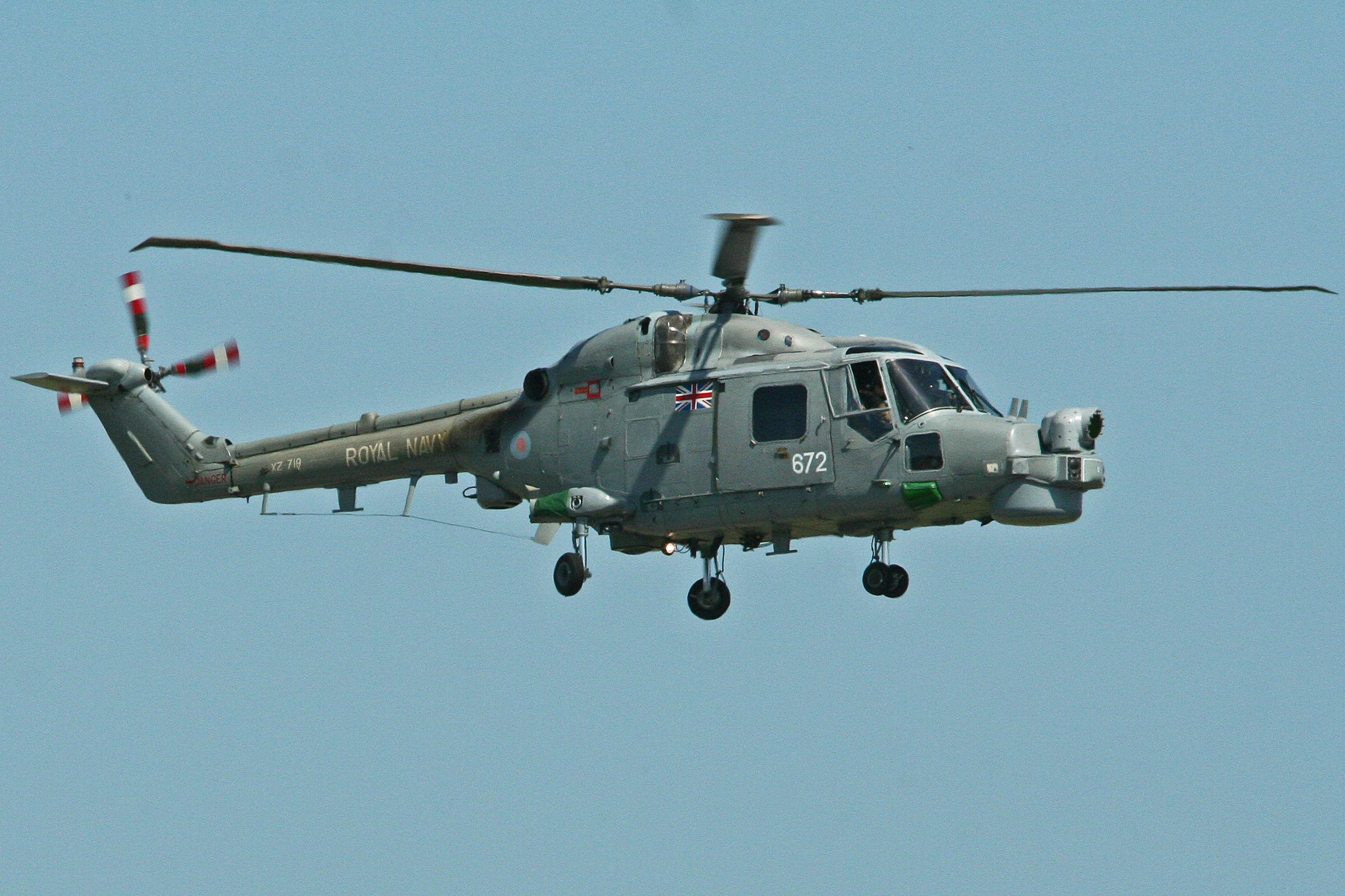
Westland Lynx HMA.8

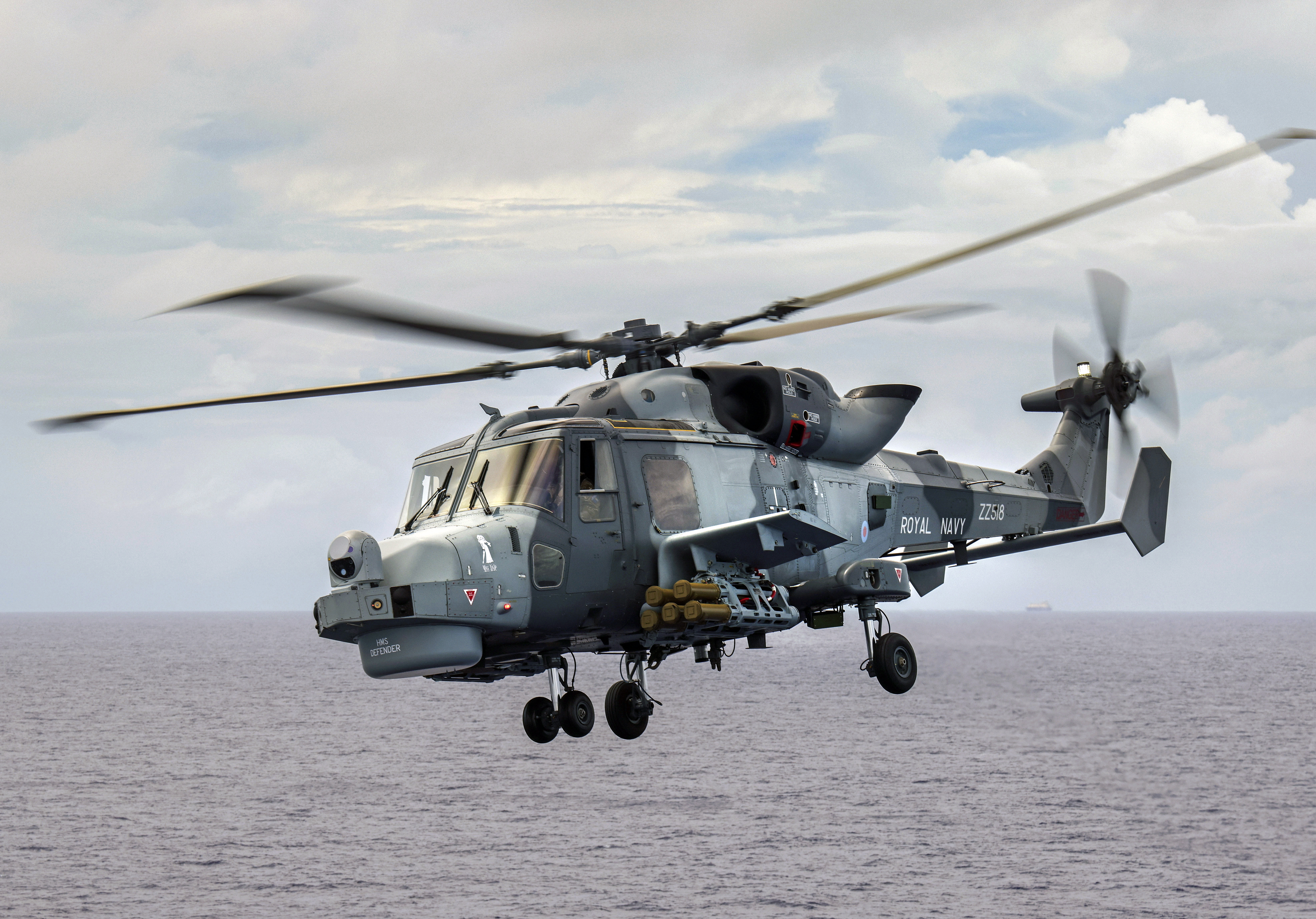
AgustaWestland Wildcat HMA2

- 700W Naval Air Squadron
  - AgustaWestland Wildcat HMA2 (January 2013 - July 2014)
- 702 Naval Air Squadron
  - Westland Lynx HAS.3 (June 1982 - March 2013)
  - Westland Lynx HMA.8 (June 1999 - July 2014)
- 815 Naval Air Squadron
  - Westland Lynx HAS.3 (November 1982 - March 2013)
  - Westland Lynx HMA.8 (July 1994 - March 2017)
  - AgustaWestland Wildcat HMA2 (April 2016 – present)
- 825 Naval Air Squadron
  - AgustaWestland Wildcat HMA2 (August 2014 – present)

== Location ==
It is based at Royal Naval Air Station Yeovilton (HMS Heron) in Somerset, England. The airbase has been through numerous updates and infrastructure improvements as part of the Wildcat Infrastructure Programme, by the Defence Infrastructure Organisation (DIO), required to enable the Royal Navy and Army Wildcat to exist in the same operational base, with RNAS Yeovilton the single operating base for the Wildcat.

== Force commanders ==
List of commanding officers of Lynx Helicopter Force (LHF), Lynx Wildcat Maritime Force (LWMF) and Wildcat Maritime Force (WMF):

- Commander N.R. Gaunt, RN, from 12 June 2001
- Commander M.A. Sheehan, RN, from 19 June 2003
- Commander S.E. Kilby, RN, from 10 September 2005
- Commander N.G. Amphlett, RN, from 10 April 2008
- Commander R.M. Ryan, RN, from 30 June 2010
- Commander K.P. Fleming, RN, from 10 November 2012
- Commander L.M. Wilson-Chalon, RN, from 20 May 2014
- Commander M.J. Carnie, RN, from 28 July 2016
- Commander M. Boulind, RN, from December 2018
- Commander J. Dransfield, RN, from 23 November 2020
- Commander A Lang, RN,
- Commander A.G. Henderson RN, from 4 July 2025

== See also ==
- List of aircraft units of the Royal Navy
- Wildcat Demo Team
