= Gary Vandermolen =

English-Israeli footballer

Personal information
- Date of birth: 2 May 1960 (age 66)
- Place of birth: Southend, England
- Position: Forward

Youth career
- Wimbledon
- Southend United

Senior career*
Years	Team	Apps	(Gls)
1986–1988	Beitar Jerusalem	30	(6)
- * Club domestic league appearances and goals

Gary Vandermolen (born 2 May 1960) is an English retired Israeli footballer. During his career, Vandermolen played for Wimbledon and Southend United at youth level and for Beitar Jerusalem at senior level. Since retiring, he has become one of the highest ranked amateur golfers in Israel.

== Honours ==
- Liga Leumit
  - Winner 1986-87
