= Wildcat Demo Team =

Aerobatics display team of the Royal Navy

Wildcat Demo Team The Black Cats
- Wildcat Demo Team logo
- Active: 2001–present
- Country: United Kingdom
- Branch: Royal Navy
- Type: Aerobatic display team
- Role: Public display / formation aerobatics
- Size: 1 or 2 helicopters
- Part of: 825 Naval Air Squadron
- Home station: RNAS Yeovilton
- Colours: Grey and Black
- Website: Black Cats Helicopter Display Team

Commanders
- Black 1: Lieutenant Commander Jim Fraser
- Black 2: Lieutenant Commander Tom Pethick

Aircraft flown
- Attack helicopter: Westland Lynx HAS.2, HAS.3 & HMA.8 (2001 - 2014); AgustaWestland Wildcat HMA.2 (2014 - present)

The Wildcat Demo Team, also known as the Black Cats helicopter display team, is the official Royal Navy helicopter aerobatics display team. It is composed of one or two AgustaWestland Wildcat HMA.2 anti-submarine (ASW) and anti-surface (ASuW) helicopters. The aircrew and engineers are all volunteers from 825 Naval Air Squadron and the Wildcat Maritime Force based at RNAS Yeovilton (HMS Heron), in Somerset.

The team performs at airshows and other public events around the UK and Europe. They perform an air display which mixes close formation, opposition and synchronised manoeuvres.

The team was established in 2001 under the name Lynx Pair and has served as the inaugural official flying display team of the Royal Navy since the disbandment of The Sharks in the mid-1990s. The designation "Black Cats" originates from the fierce feline illustrated on the emblem of the now-disbanded 702 Naval Air Squadron, as well as from the naval slang term "blackcatting", which refers to the act of demonstrating superiority or possessing something of greater value than another individual.

== History ==
=== Westland Lynx (2001 - 2014) ===
The Black Cats helicopter display team were formed in 2001 and performed using the navalised version of the Westland Lynx, a multi-purpose military helicopter. For their first three display seasons, the team was known as the Lynx Pair, however, the Black Cats title was applied to the team instead in 2004. The team's predecessors as the Royal Navy Helicopter Display Team were "The Sharks", who used four red Westland Gazelle helicopters and disbanded in 1992 and some of their routines were incorporated into the Black Cats display.

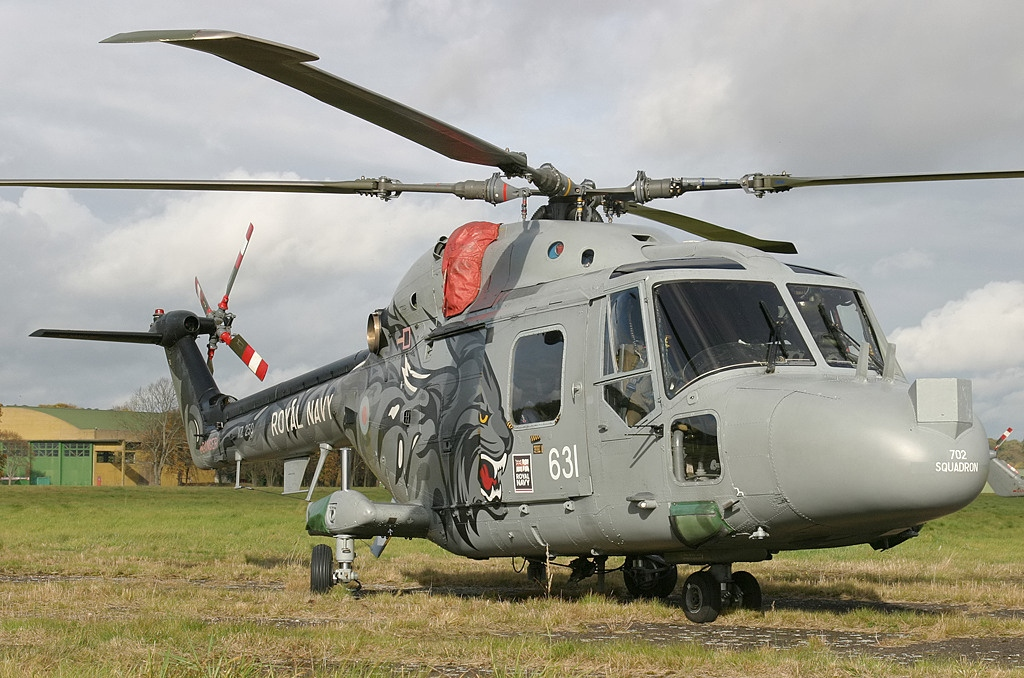
Westland Lynx HAS3S, 702 Naval Air Squadron, RNAS Yeovilton, seen here in Black Cats colour scheme

The aircrew and engineers were all volunteers from 702 Naval Air Squadron and the Lynx Helicopter Force which were both based at the RNAS Yeovilton (HMS Heron), in Somerset.

The Lynx Pair won 'The Steedman Display Sword' for the best United Kingdom participant at the Royal International Air Tattoo in 2003 and as "Les Chats Noirs" performed at the French Navy's 30th Anniversary of operating the Lynx helicopter at Lanvéoc in Brittany. This success brought about both the Royal Navy and AgustaWestland to increase their support to the team and the Black Cats came into being.

Lieutenant Dave Lilly, RN, was chosen for the 2008 display season as ‘Black 2’, with the team leader, ‘Black 1’, Lieutenant Commander Alun ‘Lucky Al’ Read, RN, who went on to receive an MBE. The following year was the Royal Navy’s Fly Navy 100 (FN100) celebration for 100 years of innovation in naval aviation from 1909 when an airship was ordered by the Admiralty. Lieutenant Dave Lilly, RN, had a second season with the team, but this time as ‘Black 1’, with Lieutenant A.J. Thompson, RN, as ‘Black 2’, for 2009.

The 2010 Black Cats display team were led by Lieutenant Becky Frater, RN, piloting ‘Black 1’, with Lieutenant Chris Chambers, RN, in charge of ‘Black 2’. Lieutenant Frater was the only female helicopter pilot in the Royal Navy and the first female pilot to fly in and lead the Royal Navy Black Cats. Rear Admiral Tom Cunningham, Assistant Chief of the Naval Staff (Aviation & Carriers), provided sign-off for the 2010 Black Cats team to display.

The 2011 display programme was announced in March, with fifteen airshows in the schedule between May and October and the team prepared by practising both the Pairs and Solo display routines. Once again it was Rear Admiral Tom Cunningham, RN, who authorised the display on 12 May, with the previous year’s ‘Black 2’, Lieutenant Chris Chambers, RN, now team leader and flying ‘Black 1’ along with Lieutenant Dave Fleming, RN, in ‘Black 2’.

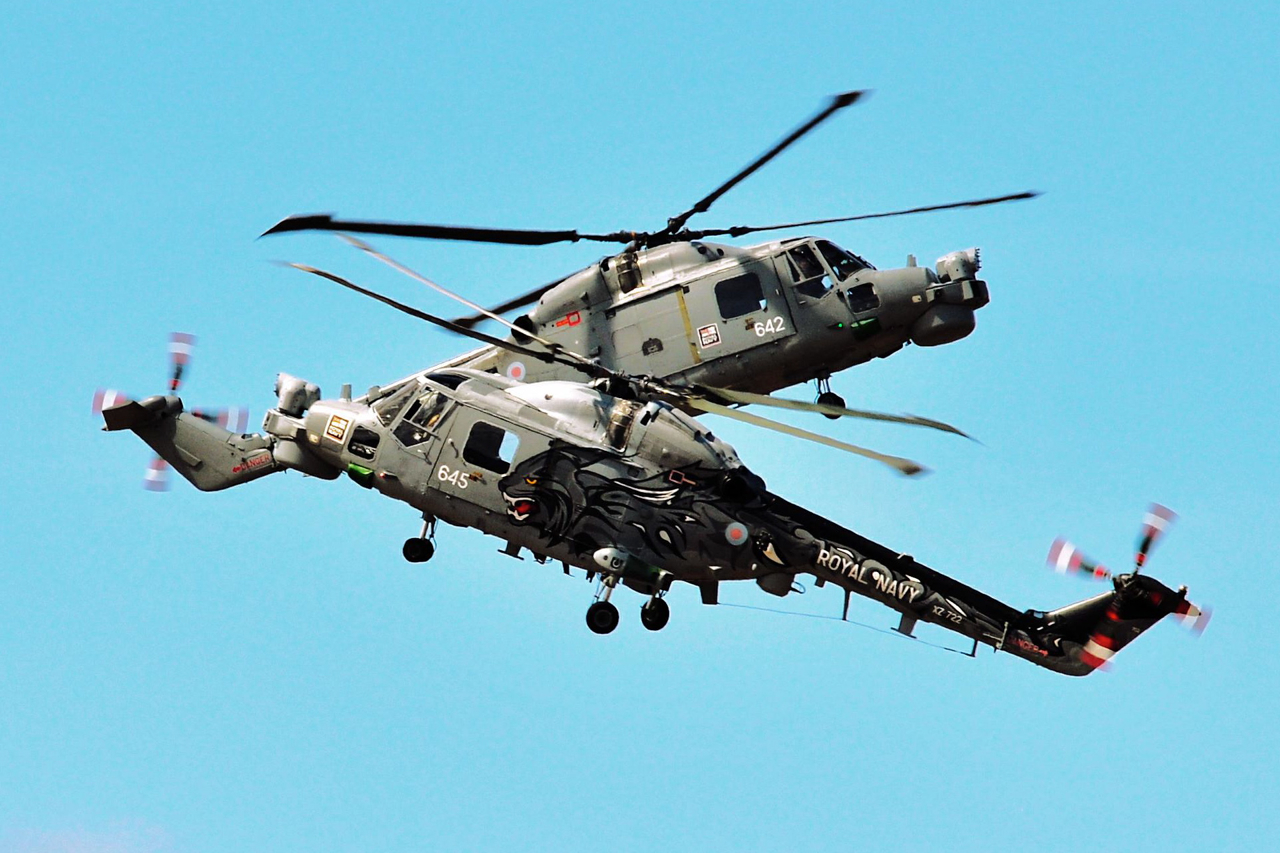
Westland Lynx; Southport Airshow two Royal Navy Black cats pass close together.

Again it was the Assistant Chief of Naval Staff (Aviation & Carriers), Rear Admiral Tom Cunningham, RN, who authorised the display, this time for the 2012 display season, which initially had thirteen venues scheduled between May and October 2012. The previous year's 'Black 2' was now Team Leader and 'Black 1', Lieutenant Dave Fleming, RN and the new 'Black 2' was Lieutenant Ian Brannighan, RN.

The Black Cats team put out a message that the 2013 display season would consist of a solo Westland Lynx HMA.8 display. The decision was based around the age of the Westland Lynx helicopter airframes and the impending retirement of the type, versus the Royal Navy’s current front line operational needs, along with the introduction of the AgustaWestland Wildcat HMA.2 and the training requirements on that type for the, at that time, existing Fleet Air Arm pilots, air observers and air engineering ranks. The 2013 display season pilot was Lieutenant A.J. Thompson, RN, who had previously been 'Black 2' during the 2009 display season.

=== Westland Lynx & AgustaWestland Wildcat (2014) ===
Due to the transition within the Royal Navy from the Westland Lynx HMA.8 to the AgustaWestland Wildcat HMA.2, one of the Lynx helicopters was replaced within the team with a Wildcat helicopter for the 2014 display season.

For the season, the team comprised Black 1, Lieutenant Commander Gary McCall, RN flying an AgustaWestland Wildcat, and Black 2, Lieutenant Ian Houlston, RN, flying a Westland Lynx, with Lieutenant Frank Suter, RN, serving as observer.

The 2014 season was the last year with the Lynx HMA.8.

=== AgustaWestland Wildcat (2015 - present) ===
From the 2015 display season onwards, the team now only operates with the AgustaWestland Wildcat HMA.2 and for the 2015 and 2016 display seasons it used two of these helicopters.

On 11 June 2015, the Black Cats made public that they had been granted their Public Display Authority (PDA) The inaugural public display of the Black Cats using a pair of AgustaWestland Wildcat HMA.2, from 825 Naval Air Squadron at RNAS Yeovilton (HMS Heron), was at the Biggin Hill Festival of Flight on 13 June 2015.

	2015
Black 1	Lt David Lilly
Black 2	Lt James Woods

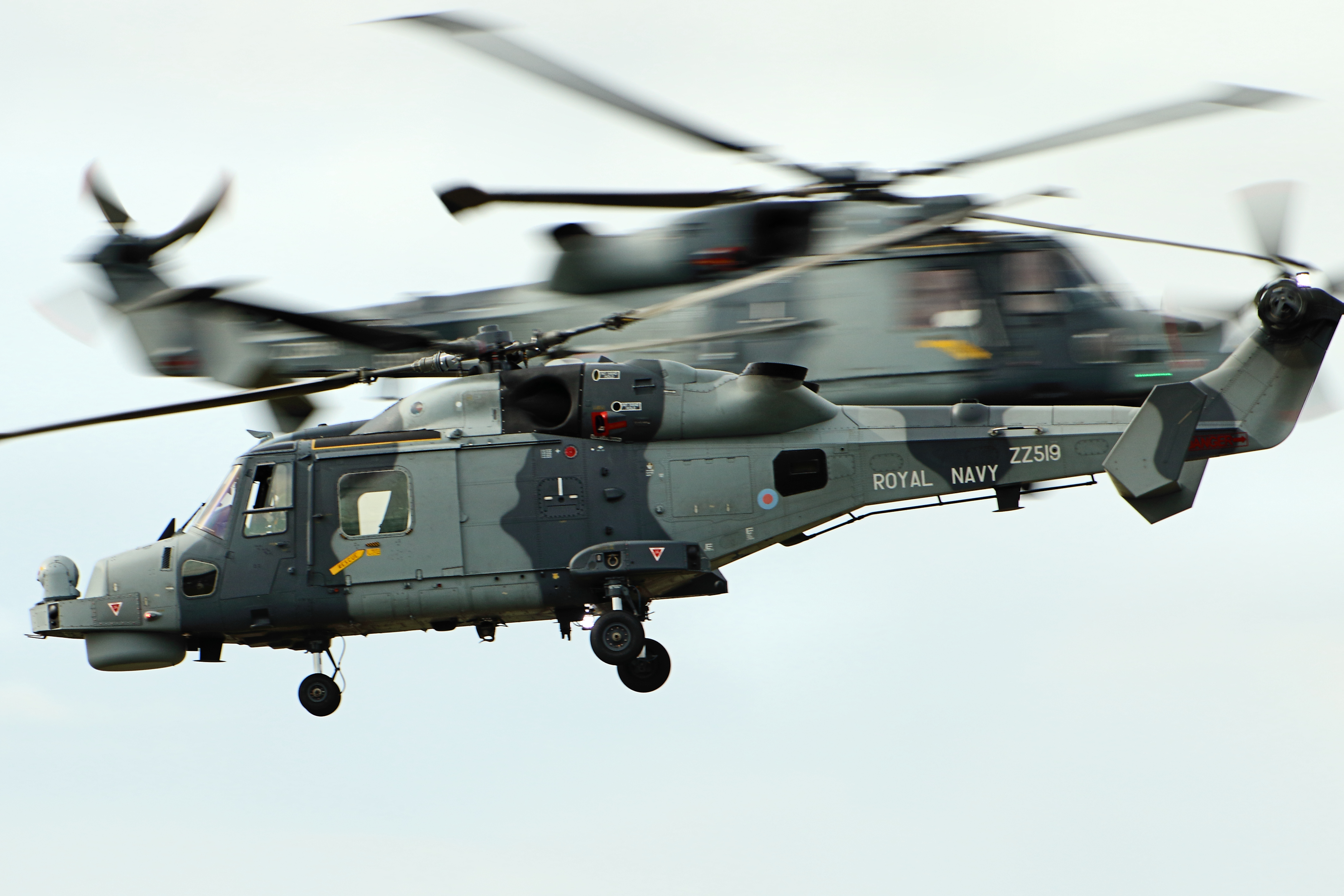
The Black Cats at RIAT 2016

It was announced on 17 May 2016 that the Royal Navy’s Black Cats helicopter display team had been formally awarded its Public Display Authority (PDA) by the Royal Navy’s head of the Fleet Air Arm, Rear Admiral Keith Blount, KCB, OBE, FRAeS, RN. 2016 season team leader and pilot of 'Black 1', Lieutenant Commander David Lilly in his fourth season, and the pilot of 'Black 2', Lieutenant Chris Rebbeck, were both Qualified Helicopter Instructors with 825 Naval Air Squadron at RNAS Yeovilton (HMS Heron).

The Black Cats were not active and did not display during 2017 or 2018. However, for the 2019 display season, the Black Cats operated with only one AgustaWestland Wildcat HMA2.

On 25 May 2019 RNAS Yeovilton announced that the Royal Navy’s Black Cats single helicopter display, piloted by Lieutenant Chris Rebbeck, RN, had been formally awarded its Public Display Authority (PDA) by the Royal Navy’s head of the Fleet Air Arm, Rear Admiral Martin John Connell, CBE, RN.

==== Wildcat Demo Team ====
At the beginning of 2020 the Royal Navy introduced the "Wildcat Demo Team" for the 2020 display season, as a single AgustaWestland Wildcat HMA2 from RNAS Yeovilton (HMS Heron). It stated the name Black Cats is associated with a helicopter pair display and the name change was to improve perception of a single helicopter display.

With a national lockdown announced on 23 March 2020 in response to the COVID-19 pandemic in the United Kingdom, under the Black Cats name a statement was released around pausing display training, eventually leading to no Royal Navy helicopter displays during the 2020 flying display season.

For the 2021 display season the Wildcat Demo Team display was authorised on 11 June, by Rear Admiral Martin John Connell, CBE, RN, during his visit to both 815 and 825 Naval Air Squadrons at RNAS Yeovilton (HMS Heron), two years since the last Royal Navy helicopter display at a UK airshow. Piloting the Wildcat helicopter was Lieutenant Ryan Wotton, RN. Following granting of the Public Display Authority (PDA), the Wildcat Demo Team were scheduled to display at the 2021 British Grand Prix, Silverstone, the 825 Naval Air Squadron Wings Parade at RNAS Yeovilton (HMS Heron), the Sidmouth Airshow, the Bournemouth Air Festival and the International Sanicole Airshow in Belgium.

On 24 May 2022 the display team received official approval for the year’s display season. It again was a solo AugustaWestland Wildcat HMA.2 from 825 Naval Air Squadron, flown by Lieutenant Jim Carver, RN. Nine airshows were on the schedule for 2022, including one overseas in Belgium. With the passing of Elizabeth II just two days before the 43rd International Sanicole Airshow the Royal Navy's Wildcat display was withdrawn from the Belgium event.

==== Black Cats return ====
825 Naval Air Squadron announced that the 2023 Royal Navy Black Cats Helicopter Display Team display had been formally signed-off by Rear Admiral Steve Moorhouse, CBE, RN, on 15 June, to enable the Black Cats to participate in National Armed Forces Day celebration at Falmouth, Cornwall on 24 June. The team returned to a two helicopter display and at certain venues historic aircraft from the NavyWings Heritage Flight flew with the Black Cats. The team was set for twelve air shows in 2023. Lieutenant Commander Jim Carver, RN, was the team leader in ‘Black 1’.

On 24 April 2024 both The Black Cats and 825 Naval Air Squadron announced the display pilots for the 2024 season would be Lieutenant Scott Sunderland and Lieutenant Michael "Viv" Vivian, and that they would be conducting both Solo and Pairs displays during the 2024 display season.

On 23 May 2025, the new Black Cats pilots received formal endorsement for the 2025 season. Qualified Helicopter Instructors Lieutenant Tom Pethick and Lieutenant Gary McCall underwent evaluation by Rear Admiral Anthony Rimington, who awarded them their signature Black overalls. Eleven airshows were scheduled for the 2025 season: English Riviera Airshow, Cosford Airshow, Plymouth Armed Forces Day, Royal International Air Tattoo (RIAT), Cowes Week, Eastbourne International Airshow, The International Ayrshow - Festival Of Flight, Jersey International Air Display and Internation Sanicole Airshow.

On 29 May 2026, RNAS Culdrose declared that the Royal Navy’s Black Cat Display Team had received their Public Display Authorisation from Rear Admiral Rimington. Pilots for the Black Cats team, Lieutenant Commander Jim Fraser and Lieutenant Commander Tom Pethick, were granted this official endorsement and were awarded the prestigious Black Cat overalls.

The 2026 Black Cats display team was scheduled to perform a solo Wildcat helicopter routine at a series of UK and European airshows, beginning with the English Riviera Airshow on 30–31 May and continuing with appearances at RAF Cosford on 14 June, Airbourne at Eastbourne from 13–16 August, and the Le Touquet Airshow on 26–27 September. The planned participation at the Royal International Air Tattoo from 17–19 July was later cancelled. The 2026 team comprises display pilot Jim Fraser, head of engineering Nick Hulland, display observer Olie Mendham and pilot Tom Pethick, for selected events during his second season.

== Pilots and planning ==
Selection for the Black Cats display team begins in the autumn of the preceding year. Aircrew are required to have at least 1,000 flying hours and be recommended for display flying. Unlike dedicated military display teams, Black Cats personnel undertake display flying on a voluntary basis alongside their primary operational duties.

The team deploys in a manner similar to a frontline Wildcat flight, operating with its own engineering support and maintaining a self-sufficient capability. Airshow participation is coordinated between 825 Naval Air Squadron, the Joint Support Air Tasking Organisation (SATO), and the Royal Navy’s public engagement team. Wherever possible, display commitments are combined with Operational Conversion Unit training, allowing student aircrew to gain experience during deployments, including overseas navigation exercises.

== Display workup ==
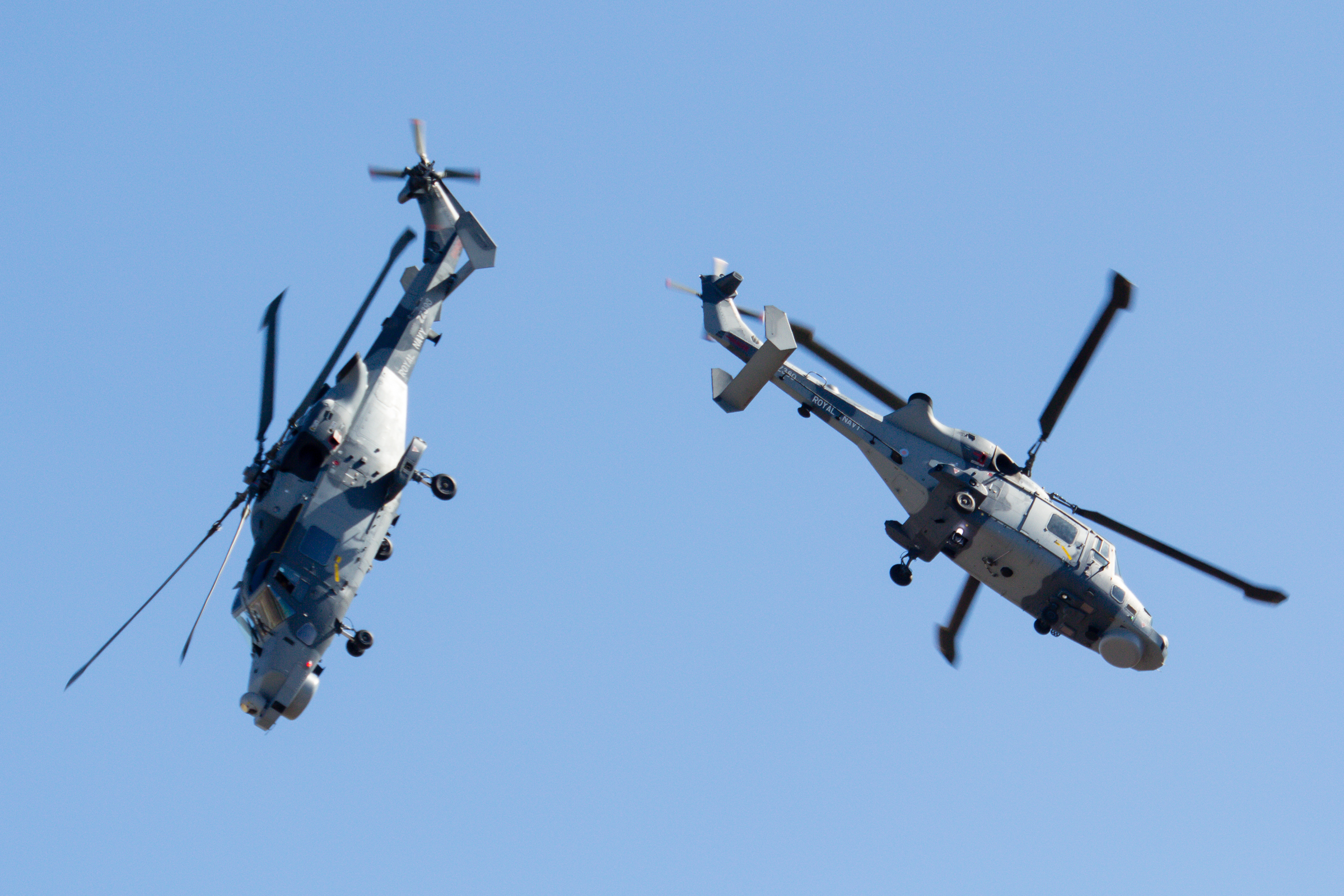
Black Cats flying the Wildcat HM2

Preparation for the display season begins in the spring, with the newly selected aircrew training under the supervision of the previous year’s pilots. Display manoeuvres are initially practised in the simulator at RNAS Yeovilton, including emergency scenarios, before progressing to live flying at RNAS Merryfield, where the routine is developed from individual manoeuvres into the complete sequence. The finished display comprises twenty-one manoeuvres and lasts approximately eight minutes and is designed to demonstrate the Wildcat’s agility and performance while maintaining a smooth, controlled and safe routine.

The team continues its work-up throughout April and May, including practice flights over the Jurassic Coast to prepare for the conditions encountered at seaside airshows. Following a successful assessment at RNAS Yeovilton, the team will aim to be awarded their Public Display Authority (PDA) by the current Director of Force Generation, Navy Command Rear Admiral Fleet Air Arm, authorising it to perform its approved display routine at public airshows during the season.

== See also ==
- Blue Eagles – disbanded British Army Air Corps helicopter display team.
- Red Arrows – the British Royal Air Force aerobatics display team.
- Typhoon Display Team
- Chinook Display Team – the British Royal Air Force helicopter display team.
- Royal Navy and Fleet Air Arm aerobatic teams
