= Becky Frater =

Helicopter pilot and hockey player

Becky Frater is a helicopter pilot and hockey player. Frayer was educated at Westcliff High School for Girls. Frater trained to be a teacher but in 1997 she joined the Army. She was the first woman to command a naval air squadron in the Royal Navy, the first pilot of the Lynx attack helicopter "Maritime Attack" and the first female member of the Black Cats display team. She is a keen hockey player and has played for England. In 2019 Frater was one of 100 women who were chosen for a photographic exhibition in Leicester highlighting women who had completed firsts.
