= 702 Naval Air Squadron =

Inactive flying squadron of the Royal Navy's Fleet Air Arm

702 Naval Air Squadron ~~702 (Catapult) Flight FAA~~
- Squadron Badge
- Active: Royal Air Force; 1936–1939; Royal Navy: 1939–1940; 1940–1943; 1945–1946; 1949–1952; 1957–1958; 1978–2014
- Disbanded: 1 August 2014
- Country: United Kingdom
- Branch: Royal Navy
- Type: Fleet Air Arm Second Line Squadron
- Role: Catapult Flights; Long Range Catapult Squadron; Instrument Flying Training and Checking Unit; Naval Jet Evaluation Training Unit; Junior Officers Air Course; Lynx Headquarters and Training Squadron
- Size: Squadron
- Part of: Fleet Air Arm
- Home station: See Naval air stations section for full list.
- Mottos: Cave Ungues Felis (Latin for 'Beware the Claws of the Cat')
- Aircraft: See Aircraft flown section for full list.

Insignia
- Squadron Badge Description: White, in front of a roundel gyronny blue and white a demi-lynx erased gold armed and langued red (1978)
- Identification Markings: E8A+ (Swordfish); individual letters (Seafox); 190–199 (Sea Vampire / Attacker); 400–404 (Meteor); 750–756 (Sea Balliol / Sea Vampire / Sea Prince); 740–747 (Lynx, January 1978 – September 1982); 321-480/parent ship letters (Ships' Flights in series, January 1978 – December 1980); 630–637, 640–647 (September 1982); 670–673, to 630–644 (March 1999)
- Fin Shore Codes: CW (Sea Vampire / Attacker / Meteor); FD (Sea Balliol / Sea Vampire / Sea Prince); VL (Lynx, January 1978 – September 1982)

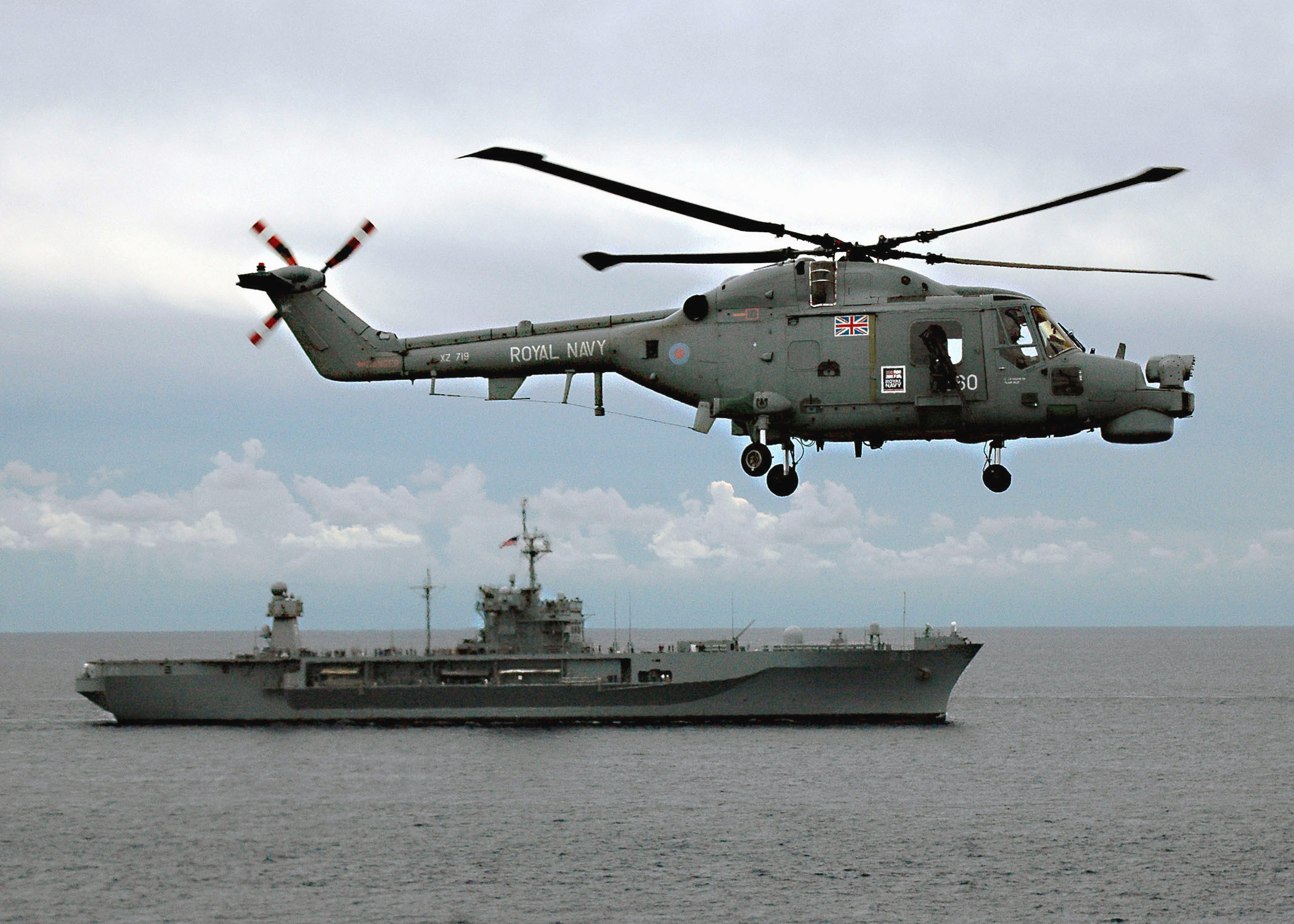
Westland Lynx HMA.8, 702 Squadron, flies near the United States Sixth Fleet flagship the Blue Ridge-class command ship USS Mount Whitney on the Mediterranean Sea during Exercise DESTINED GLORY (Loyal Midas) 2005.

702 Naval Air Squadron (702 NAS), also referred to as 702 Squadron, is an inactive Fleet Air Arm (FAA) naval air squadron of the United Kingdom’s Royal Navy (RN). It most recently operated the Westland Lynx, as the Lynx Headquarters and Training Squadron, between January 1978 and August 2014.

It was last based at HMS Heron, RNAS Yeovilton, Somerset and earlier at HMS Osprey, RNAS Portland, Dorset. As a training squadron it trained all ground and air crew for the sister front-line maritime Lynx unit, 815 Naval Air Squadron. It initially formed during July 1936 as a Catapult Flight for the 2nd Battle Squadron based at RAF Mount Batten and routinely embarking in RN ships such as, HMS Nelson, HMS Rodney and HMS Resolution. By 1939 it was known as 702 Naval Air Squadron but disbanded in January 1940.

It was active twice more during the Second World War, between December 1940 and July 1943 as a Long Range Catapult Squadron and then between June 1945 and September 1946 as an Instrument Flying Training and Checking Unit. A Naval Jet Evaluation Training Unit was the squadron’s next role between April 1949 and August 1952, followed by a Junior Officers Air Course between September 1957 and August 1958. It last reformed as the Lynx Headquarters and Training Squadron at HMS Heron, during January 1978.

== History ==
=== Formation and Second World War (1936–1945) ===
702 Naval Air Squadron was founded on 15 July 1936 to operate aircraft from the ships of the 2nd Battle Squadron. Operating Supermarine Walrus, an amphibious maritime patrol aircraft, and Fairey Seal, a carrier-borne spotter-reconnaissance biplane, from its base at the Royal Air Force station and flying boat base RAF Mount Batten, located in Plymouth Sound, Devon, initially, later these were replaced by the biplane torpedo bomber Fairey Swordfish float-plane variant. Aircraft were attached to the name ship of her class HMS Nelson, sister ship HMS Rodney and the Revenge-class battleship HMS Resolution. Granted Squadron status in 1939, and briefly disbanded in 1940.

==== Ships' Flights ====
702 (Catapult) Flight operated a number of ships’ flights between 1936 and 1940 whilst based out of RAF Mount Batten, including the name ship of her class HMS Nelson between 1936–39, the Revenge-class battleship HMS Ramillies during 1937, the Revenge-class battleship HMS Resolution between 1939–40, the Nelson-class battleship HMS Rodney between 1939–40, and the Revenge-class battleship HMS Royal Oak between 1937–38.

702 Naval Air Squadron reformed as a Long Range Catapult squadron equipped with the biplane Fairey Seafox, a ship-borne reconnaissance seaplane, for duty in armed merchant cruisers (AMCs) for much of the Second World War. It was based out of RNAS Lee-on-Solent (HMS Daedalus), Hampshire, England. The initial ship was Alcantara, followed by Pretoria Castle, Canton, Queen of Bermuda and Asturias. On 10 May 1942 a Hawker Sea Hurricane flight was formed and used on the CAM ship HMS Maplin. The squadron disbanded in July 1943.

==== AMC Ships' Flights ====
702 Long Range Catapult squadron operated a number of armed merchant cruisers ships’ flights between 1941 and 1943: the armed merchant cruiser HMS Alcantara between 1941-42, her sister ship HMS Asturias during 1942–43, HMS Canton 1941–42, the auxiliary cruiser HMS Carnarvon Castle between 1941–42, the converted ocean liner HMS Pretoria Castle between 1941–42, and the converted ocean liner HMS Queen of Bermuda between 1941–42.

=== Instrument Flying Training & Checking Squadron (1945–1946) ===
On 1 June 1945 702 Naval Air Squadron reformed as an offshoot of 758 Naval Air Squadron, equipped with Airspeed Oxford, a training aircraft, and North American Harvard, an advanced training aircraft, as an Instrument Flying Training & Checking Squadron. Seven weeks later the squadron personnel took passage to RNAS Schofields in Australia.

It arrived at the airbase on 4 September. The airfield was on loan from the Royal Australian Air Force (RAAF) and was the chosen location for Mobile Operational Naval Air Base III (MONAB III) logistical unit, which was already equipped with a mobile Beam Approach Beacon System (BABS) van, however, the squadron’s training equipment did not materialise so it focused on the instrument flying training until 702 Naval Air Squadron was disbanded at RNAS Schofields in September 1946.

=== Naval Jet Evaluation Training Unit (1949–1952) ===
In 1949 the squadron reformed at RNAS Culdrose (HMS Seahawk), Cornwall, England, as the Naval Jet Evaluation Training Unit. Equipped initially with four de Havilland Sea Vampire single-seat jet fighter, it also became the first unit of either the RAF or FAA to fly the Gloster Meteor T.7 jet trainer and was the first unit to achieve jet landings at night on an aircraft carrier, embarked in HMS Implacable and later HMS Theseus. The squadron received Supermarine Attacker F.l, a British single-seat naval jet fighter, in March 1952, and proceeded converting piston-engined pilots to jets, but in August 1952 the squadron was renumbered as 736 Naval Air Squadron in August 1952.

=== Junior Officers Air Course (1957–1958) ===
In September 1957, 702 Naval Air Squadron next reformed at RNAS Lee-on-Solent (HMS Daedalus), Hampshire, England, out of the Junior Officers Air Course Flight of 781 Naval Air Squadron. It was quipped with Boulton Paul Sea Balliol, an advanced trainer aircraft, de Havilland Sea Vampire T.22, a two-seat jet trainer, and a Percival Sea Prince transport aircraft, for training. A fortnight after standing up it moved to RNAS Ford (HMS Peregrine), Sussex, where it disbanded almost twelve months later in August 1958, being absorbed into 727 Naval Air Squadron at RNAS Brawdy (HMS Goldcrest), Pembrokeshire, Wales.

=== Lynx Headquarters and Training Squadron (1978–2014) ===
In January 1978, 702 Naval Air Squadron reformed from 700L Naval Air Squadron, the Lynx Intensive Flying Trials Unit (IFTU), at RNAS Yeovilton (HMS Heron), Somerset, England, to become the Lynx headquarters and training squadron.

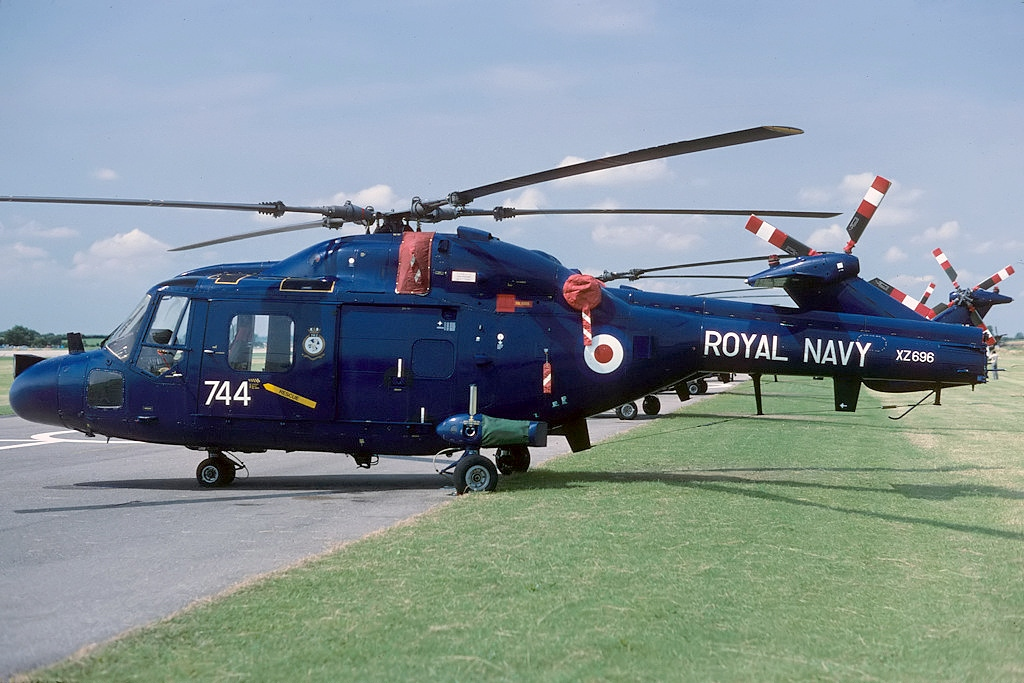
Westland Lynx HAS2, 702 Naval Air Squadron

It operated the Westland Lynx multi-purpose military helicopter, using the Maritime Lynx anti-submarine and anti-surface warfare HAS.2 and HAS.3 and the maritime attack HMA.8 variants. The squadron was tasked to provide Pilot and Observer training, and maintenance personnel, and for advanced and operational flying training, ready for ship's flights.

All RN Westland Lynx Flights were initially parented by 700L Naval Air Squadron from July 1977. This transferred to 702 Naval Air Squadron on its formation in January 1978. These Flights were formed of a single Westland Lynx HAS.2 anti-submarine helicopter, these were later followed with the HAS.3 variant and then eventually the HMA.8. Personnel consisted of a Pilot and an Observer, one as Flight Commander, Chief Petty Officer Senior Maintenance Rating and six Rating technicians.

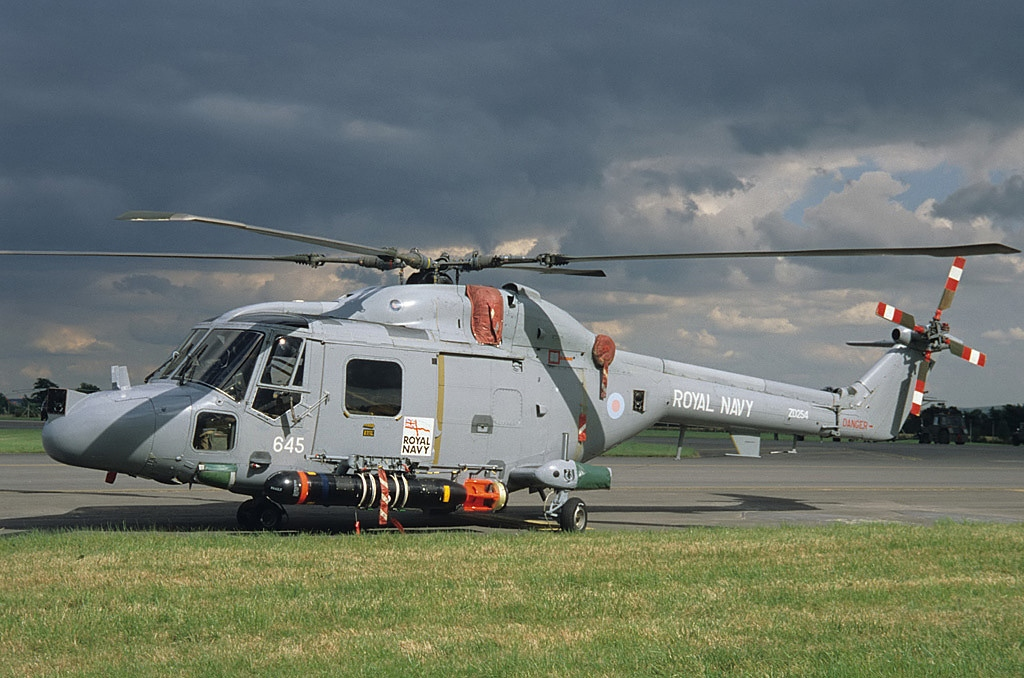
Westland Lynx HAS.3S, 702 Naval Air Squadron

In January 1981 these roles were split and the headquarters parenting duty became the charge of 815 Naval Air Squadron. The following year both squadrons relocated to RNAS Portland (HMS Osprey), Dorset, England, for a period of eighteen years before returning to its previous home location of RNAS Yeovilton in 1999.

It was one of the initial squadrons within the Lynx Helicopter Force (LHF), which was a previous Royal Navy Fleet Air Arm unit, set up around the operational deployment for the Westland Lynx.

Around 2011, it had a complement of around 160 experienced aircrew and maintainers providing training for approximately just over twelve aircrew and 100 maintainers, per annum, for 815 Naval Air Squadron. It also provided refresher training for an additional 50 aircrew.

==== Helicopter Display Team ====
The squadron was also the home of the Black Cats – the Royal Navy’s official helicopter display team. Originally known as "The Lynx Pair" the 'Black Cat' team name derives from the fierce wildcat depicted on 702 Naval Air Squadron’s badge and also the naval slang of "Black Catting" which implies one-upmanship, having something better than anyone else.

702 Naval Air Squadron disbanded at a ceremony held at the Royal Naval Air Station Yeovilton (HMS Heron) on 1 August 2014. Its aircraft transferred to 815 Naval Air Squadron.

== Aircraft flown ==
The squadron operated a variety of different aircraft and versions:

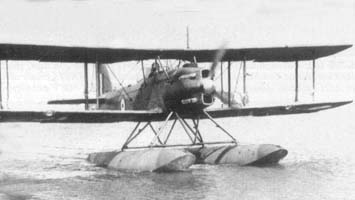
Fairey Seafox

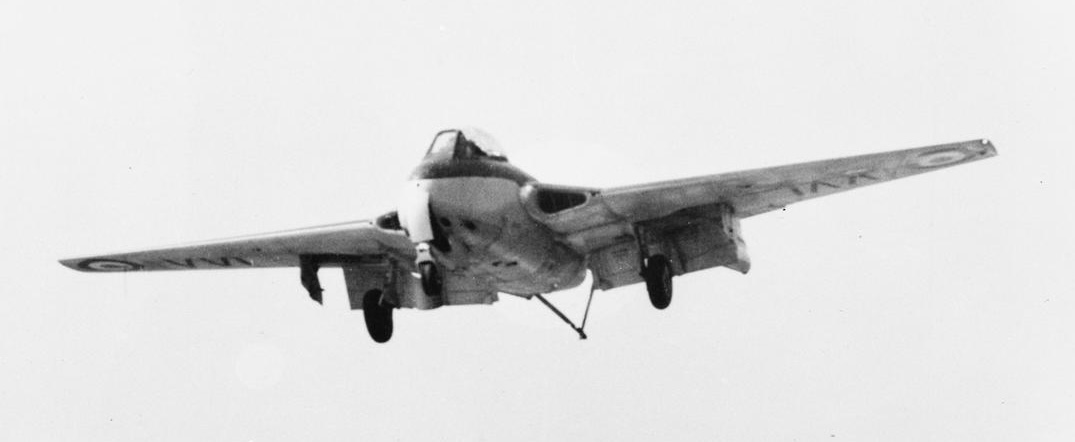
de Havilland Sea Vampire F.20

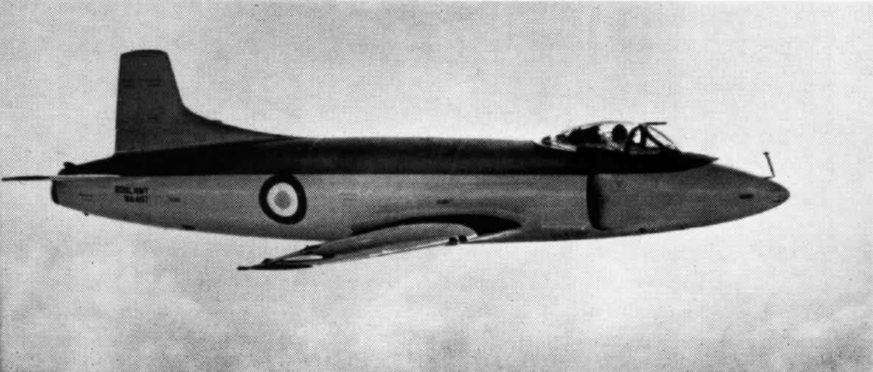
Supermarine Attacker F1

- Supermarine Walrus amphibious maritime patrol aircraft (July 1936 - September 1939)
- Fairey Seal FP Spotter-reconnaissance aircraft (February 1937 - October 1938)
- Fairey Swordfish I/FP torpedo bomber (January 1939 - January 1940)
- Fairey Seafox ship-borne reconnaissance seaplane (December 1940 - July 1943)
- Hawker Sea Hurricane Mk la fighter aircraft (May - July 1942)
- Vought Kingfisher observation floatplane (June - November 1942)
- North American Harvard IIB advanced trainer aircraft (September 1945 - February 1946)
- Airspeed Oxford training aircraft (September 1945 - March 1946)
- de Havilland Tiger Moth trainer aircraft (November 1945 - April 1946)
- de Havilland Sea Vampire F.20 fighter-bomber (April 1949 - August 1952)
- de Havilland Vampire FB.5 fighter-bomber (May 1951 - May 1952)
- Gloster Meteor T.7 jet trainer aircraft (June 1949 - August 1952)
- Supermarine Attacker F.1 jet fighter aircraft (March - August 1952)
- de Havilland Vampire T.11 jet trainer aircraft (April - July 1952)
- Boulton Paul Sea Balliol T.21 advanced trainer aircraft (October 1957 - August 1958)
- Percival Sea Prince T.1 anti-submarine training (October 1957 - August 1958)
- de Havilland Sea Vampire T.22 jet trainer aircraft (October 1957 - August 1958)
- Westland Lynx HAS.2 anti-submarine warfare helicopter (January 1978 - September 1988)
- Westland Lynx HAS.3 anti-submarine warfare helicopter(June 1982 - March 2013)
- Westland Lynx HMA.8 maritime attack helicopter (January - August 1996, June 1999 - July 2014)

== Naval air stations and aircraft carriers ==
702 Naval Air Squadron operated from a number of naval air stations of the Royal Navy (RN), both in the UK and overseas, a number of RN aircraft carriers and other RN warships, a number of Royal Fleet Auxiliary support ships and other air bases:

1936 – 1940

- Royal Air Force Mount Batten (15 July 1936 – 1 January 1938)
- Royal Air Force Lee-on-Solent (1 January 1938 – 24 May 1939)
- became Royal Naval Air Station Lee-on-Solent (HMS Daedalus) (24 May 1939 – 21 January 1940)
- disbanded – 21 January 1940

1940 – 1943

- Royal Naval Air Station Lee-on-Solent (HMS Daedalus) (27 December 1940 – July 1943)
  - Royal Naval Air Station Belfast (Hawker Sea Hurricane Flight 10 May – 7 July 1942)
- disbanded – (July 1943)

1945 – 1946

- Royal Naval Air Station Hinstock (HMS Godwit) (1 June 1945 – 21 July 1945)
- -transit- (21 July 1945 – 4 September 1945)
- Royal Naval Air Station Schofields (HMS Nabthorpe/HMS Nabstock) (4 September 1945 – 10 September 1946)
- disbanded – (10 September 1946)

1949 – 1952

- Royal Naval Air Station Culdrose (HMS Seahawk) (4 April 1949 – 26 August 1952)
  - HMS Implacable (Detachment six aircraft 21 – 26 June 1949)
  - HMS Implacable (Detachments 16 September – 11 November 1949)
  - HMS Theseus (Detachment 2 May – 30 June 1950)
  - HMS Perseus (trials detachment 29 May 1951)
- became 736 Naval Air Squadron (26 August 1952)

1957 – 1958

- Royal Naval Air Station Lee-on-Solent (HMS Daedalus) (30 September 1957 – 17 October 1957)
- Royal Naval Air Station Ford (HMS Peregrine) (17 October 1957 – 11 August 1948)
- disbanded (11 August 1958)

1978 – 2014

- Royal Naval Air Station Yeovilton (HMS Heron) (3 January 1978 – 19 July 1982)
  - Tirstrup Air Base (Detachment one helicopter 17 – 27 April 1978)
  - RFA Engadine (Detachments May 1978 – February 1989)
  - Royal Naval Air Station Prestwick (HMS Gannet) (Detachment four helicopters 15 – 19 January 1979)
  - Aalborg Air Base (Detachment three helicopters 20 April – September 1979)
  - Florennes Air Base (Detachment two helicopters 21 – 25 June 1979)
  - Tirstrup Air Base (Detachment three helicopters 18 April – 14 May 1980)
  - Royal Air Force Aldergrove (Detachment one helicopter 20 May – 6 June 1980)
  - RFA Olna (Detachment three helicopters 21 – 25 July 1980)
  - Royal Air Force Aldergrove (Detachment one helicopter 20 October – 5 December 1980)
  - RFA Fort Grange (Detachment four helicopters 27 – 31 October 1980)
  - RFA Tidespring (Detachment three helicopters 2 – 16 October 1981)
  - Royal Air Force St Mawgan (Detachment four helicopters 24 – 28 May 1982)
- Royal Naval Air Station Portland (HMS Osprey) (19July 1982 – 15 January 1999)
  - Royal Air Force Valley (Detachment four helicopters 2 – 6 August 1982)
  - Castlemartin Training Area (Detachment three helicopters 5 – 8 March 1984)
  - Royal Air Force Kinloss (Detachment three helicopters 19 – 28 March 1984, 21 – 31 January 1985)
  - Royal Air Force St Mawgan (Detachment three helicopters 11 – 17 December 1985)
  - Castlemartin Training Area (Detachment three helicopters 20 – 23 January 1986)
  - St Mandrier (Detachment four helicopters 4 – 8 September 1986)
  - RFA Argus (Detachments May 1989 – July 2014)
  - RFA Fort Austin (Detachment four helicopters 21 September – 3 October 1989)
  - RFA Olmeda (Detachment four helicopters 12 – 23 October 1990)
  - Royal Air Force St Mawgan (Detachment four helicopters 4 – 14 February 1991)
  - RFA Olmeda (Detachment four helicopters 10 – 21 May 1991)
  - RFA Olwen (A122) (Detachment four helicopters 22 November – 10 December 1991, 22 February – 5 March 1992)
  - RFA Olmeda (29 March – 8 April 1993, 24 November – 8 December 1993)
  - Montijo Air Base (Detachment four helicopters 22 – 26 September 1994)
  - RFA Fort Victoria (Detachment four helicopters 20 – 27 October 1995)
  - Ramstein Air Base (Detachment four helicopters 10 – 15 November 1995)
  - RFA Fort Victoria (Detachment four helicopters 23 November – 12 December 1995
  - Royal Naval Air Station Culdrose (HMS Seahawk) (Detachment three helicopters 15 – 19 February 1996)
  - Valkenburg Naval Air Base (Detachment three helicopters 1 – 4 March 1996)
  - RFA Fort Victoria (Detachment three helicopters 20 – 31 May 1996)
  - Værløse Air Base (Detachment four helicopters 7 – 10 June 1996, 27 September – 2 October 1996)
- Royal Naval Air Station Yeovilton (HMS Heron) (15 January 1999 – 1 August 2014)
  - RFA Fort George (Detachment five helicopters 27 November – 8 December 2000)
  - HMS Southampton (DLT 19 – 22 February 2001)
  - RFA Fort Victoria (Detachment five helicopters 19 March – 4 April 2001)
  - RFA Fort George (Detachment four helicopters 24 September – 5 October 2001)
  - Royal Air Force St Mawgan (Detachment four helicopters 3 – 12 February 2003)
  - HMS Cornwall (Detachment two helicopters 30 August – 18 September 2006)
  - RFA Fort Victoria (Detachment five helicopters 24 November – 12 December 2006)
  - HMS Ark Royal (Detachment four helicopters 6 – 23 November 2007)
  - HMS Ocean (Detachment four helicopters 7 – 23 September 2009)
  - HMS Dauntless (Detachment two helicopters February 2013)
- disbanded – (1 August 2014)

== Ship Flights ==
702 Naval Air Squadron parented a number of ships' flights between 1978 and 1980 with Westland Lynx HAS.2, by Flight Nos.:

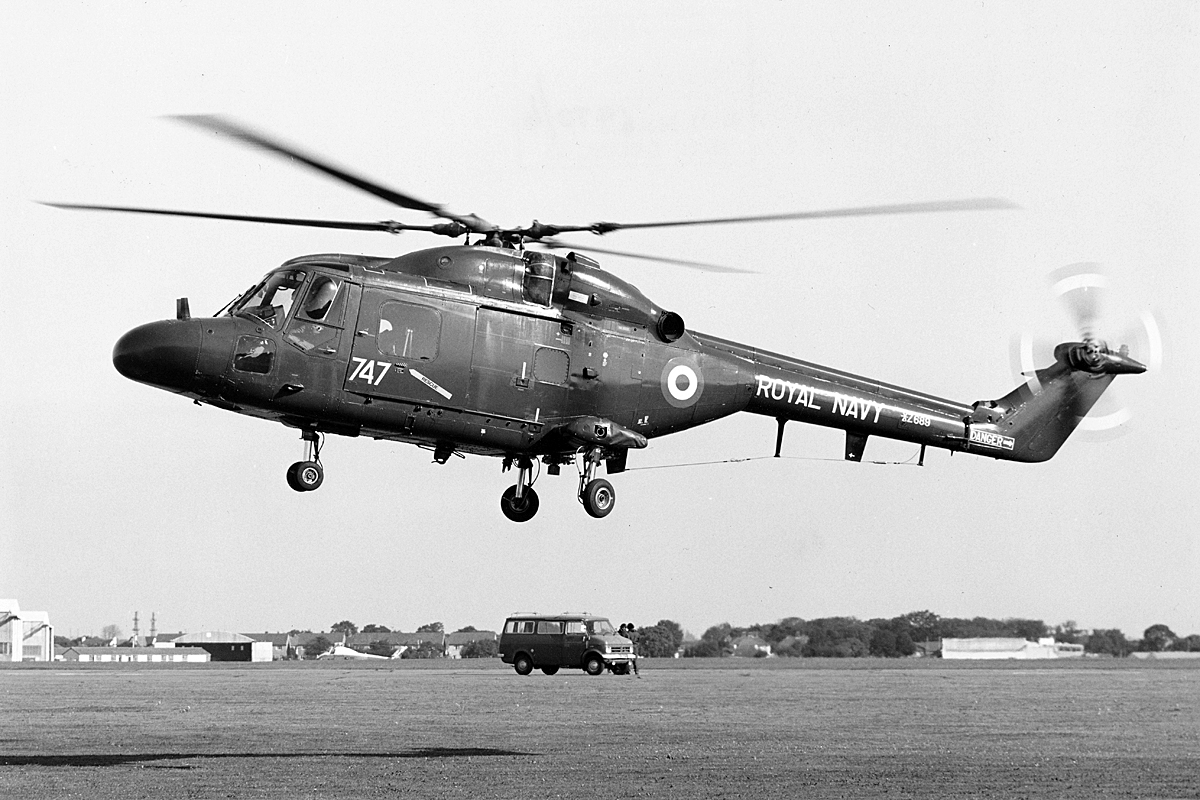
Westland Lynx HAS.2, XZ689,, 702 Squadron, RNAS Lee-on-Solent, 25 September 1979

- 200 Flight
  - HMS Birmingham (D86) (1978–1980)
- 201 Flight
  - HMS Phoebe (F42) (1978–1980)
- 202 Flight
  - HMS Sirius (F40) (1978–1980)
- 203 Flight
  - HMS Newcastle (D87) (1978–1980)
  - HMS Phoebe (F42) (1978–1980)
- 204 Flight
  - HMS Arrow (F173) (1978–1980)
- 205 Flight
  - HMS Avenger (F185) (1978–1980)
- 206 Flight
  - HMS Alacrity (F174) (1978–1980)
- 207 Flight
  - HMS Ardent (F184) (1978–1980)
- 208 Flight
  - HMS Amazon (F169) (1978–1980)
- 209 Flight
  - HMS Avenger (F185) (1978–1980)
  - HMS Cleopatra (F28) (1978–1980)
- 210 Flight
  - HMS Minerva (F45) (1978–1980)
- 211 Flight
  - HMS Argonaut (F56) (1979–1980)
  - HMS Broadsword (F88) (1980)
- 212 Flight
  - HMS Coventry (D118) (1979–1980)
- 213 Flight
  - HMS Sheffield (D80) (1979–1980)
- 214 Flight
  - HMS Cardiff (D108) (1980)
- 215 Flight
  - HMS Glasgow (D88) (1979–1980)
- 216 Flight
  - HMS Antelope (F170) (1979–1980)
- 218 Flight
  - HMS Danae (F47) (1980)
- 219 Flight
  - HMS Ambuscade (F172) (1980)
- 221 Flight
  - HMS Broadsword (F88) (1980)
- 222 Flight
  - HMS Andromeda (F57) (1980)
- Trials Flight (1980)

== Commanding officers ==
List of commanding officers of 702 Naval Air Squadron with date of appointment:

1936 – 1940

- Lieutenant S.W.D. Colls, RN, (Flight Lieutenant RAF), from 15 July 1936
- none, from 18 July 1937
- Lieutenant P.E. O'Brien, RN, (Flight Lieutenant RAF), from 14 August 1938
- not identified, from 14 November 1938
- Lieutenant Commander R.A.B. Phillimore, RN, from 24 May 1939
- disbanded – 21 January 1940

1940 – 1943

- not identified, from 27 December 1940
- disbanded – July 1943

1945 – 1946

- Lieutenant Commander(A) G.T. Bertholdt, RNVR, from 1 June 1945
- Lieutenant J.E.G. Essery, RNVR, from 4 September 1945
- disbanded – 10 September 1946

1949 – 1952

- Lieutenant(A) A.B.B. Clark, RN, from 4 April 1949
- Lieutenant N. Perrett, RN, from 3 May 1951 (Lieutenant Commander 1 October 1951)
- disbanded – 26 August 1952

1957 – 1958

- Lieutenant Commander T.V.G. Binney, RN, from 30 September 1957
- disbanded – 11 August 1958

1978 – 2014

- Lieutenant Commander B.F. Prendergast, RN, from 3 January 1978
- Lieutenant Commander R.F. Edmonds, RN, from 29 January 1980 (Commander 30 June 1980)
- Lieutenant Commander D.H.N. Yates, RN, from 29 October 1980
- Lieutenant Commander H.F. Hatton, RN, from 6 January 1981
- Lieutenant Commander T.L. Bailey, RN, from 5 May 1983
- Lieutenant Commander C.D. Ferbrache, RN, from 2 July 1985 (Commander 30 June 1986)
- Lieutenant Commander M. Bishop-Bailey, RN, from 28 July 1986
- Lieutenant Commander R.G. Burrows, RN, from 26 September 1988
- Lieutenant Commander C.L. Palmer, RN, from 27 November 1990
- Lieutenant Commander C.F. Mervik, RN, from 20 June 1991
- Lieutenant Commander P.J. Bryant, RN, from 21 February 1992
- Lieutenant Commander R.N. Wain, RN, from 4 February 1994 (Commander 30 December 1995)
- Lieutenant Commander N.P. Yates, RN, from 13 February 1996
- Lieutenant Commander A. Raggett, MVO, RN, from 26 March 1998
- Lieutenant Commander M.A. Sheehan, RN, from 28 July 2000
- Lieutenant Commander S.E. Kilby, RN, from 19 June 2001
- Lieutenant Commander M.B. Davies, RN, from 1 August 2003 (Commander 1 April 2004)
- Commander K.P. Fleming, RN, from 14 December 2005
- Commander C.D.C. Mahony, RN, from 28 March 2008
- Commander P.J.E. Hoare, RN, from 20 July 2010
- Commander A.K. Rimington, RN, 16 July 2012
- Commander G. Owen, RN, from 18 December 2013
- disbanded – 1 August 2014

Note: Abbreviation (A) signifies Air Branch of the RN or RNVR.

== See also ==
- Royal Navy and Fleet Air Arm aerobatic teams
