= Third VA-155 (U.S. Navy) =

Attack Squadron 155
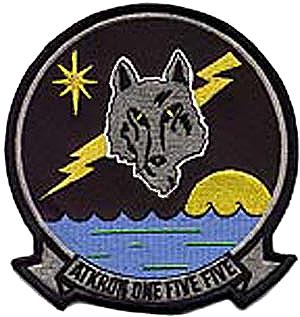
- VA-155 squadron patch
- Active: 1 September 1987 – 30 April 1993
- Country: United States
- Branch: United States Navy
- Role: Attack aircraft
- Part of: Inactive
- Nickname: Silver Fox

Aircraft flown
- Attack: A-6E/KA-6D Intruder

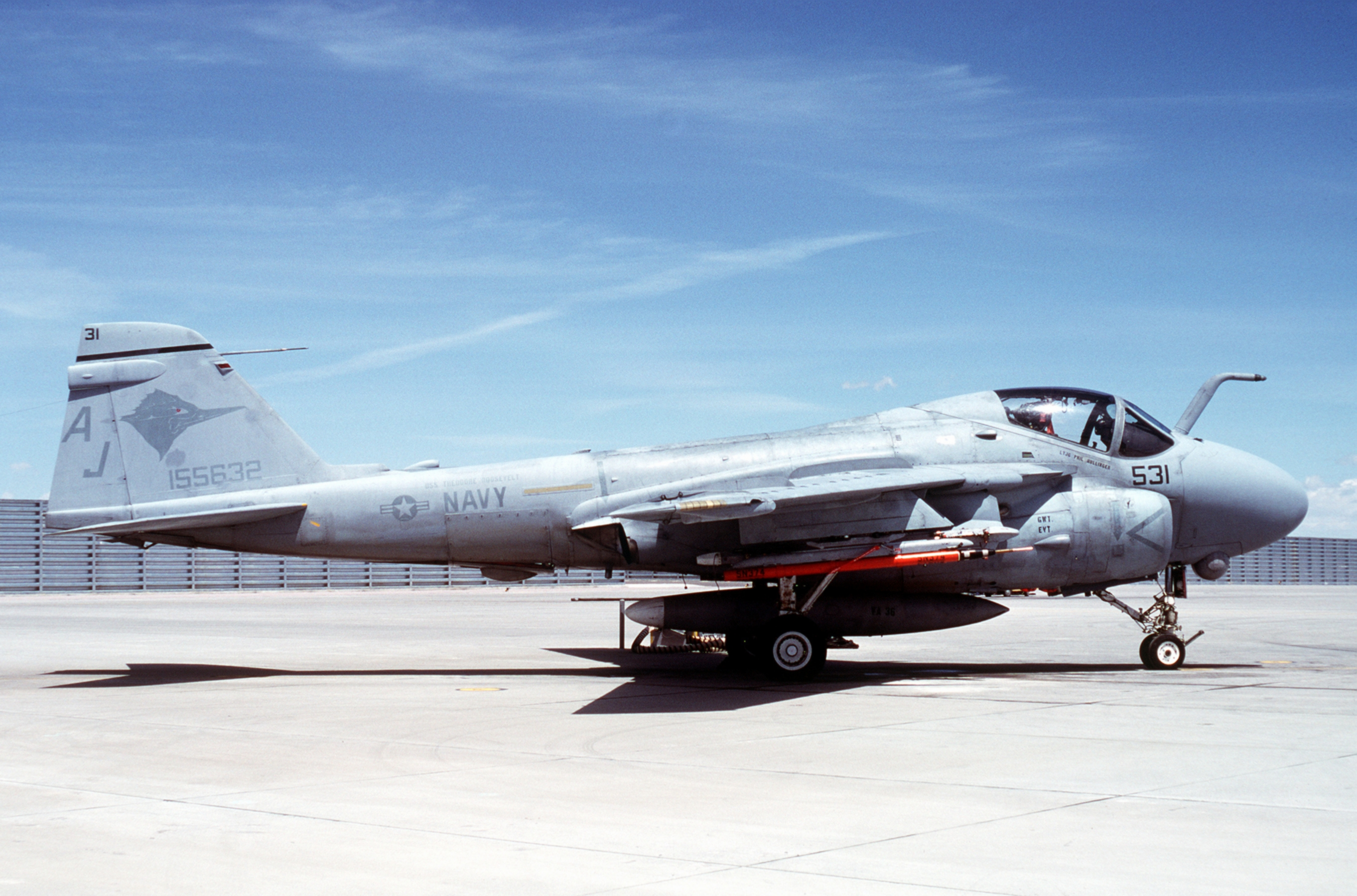
An A-6E Intruder similar to those flown by VA-155.

Attack Squadron 155 or VA-155 was an Attack Squadron of the U.S. Navy. It was established on 1 September 1987 and disestablished on 30 April 1993. It was the third squadron to be named VA-155, the first VA-155 was disestablished on 30 November 1949 and second VA-155 was originally established in 1946, redesignated as VA-155 on 4 February 1953, and disestablished on 30 September 1977. Its nickname, shared with the second VA-155 was the Silver Foxes.

== Operational history ==
- 15 August–8 October 1988: USS Independence, with VA-155 embarked, conducted a change of home port transit from Norfolk to San Diego via Cape Horn. During the transit numerous airpower demonstrations were conducted for dignitaries from various South American countries.
- 17 January 1991: The squadron conducted its first combat operations. VA-155’s commanding officer, Commander Sweigart, led Air Wing Two’s aircraft in its first strike against Iraq.
- 18 January 1991: The squadron suffered its first and only loss during the war with Iraq when one of its A-6E Intruders was shot down while on a mining sortie by the Um Qasr Naval Base in Iraq.
- 28 February 1991: USS Ranger’s last combat strike of the Gulf War was launched and led by a VA-155 aircraft. During the 43-day Gulf War the squadron flew 1,388.4 hours, a total of 635 sorties, and delivered 2,289,940 pounds of ordnance on Iraqi military targets.
- September–December 1992: Squadron aircraft flew sorties in support of Operation Southern Watch, flights over southern Iraq south of the 32nd parallel to ensure Iraq was adhering to United Nations sanctions.
- December 1992: The squadron participated in Operation Restore Hope, flying sorties in support of the humanitarian relief effort in Somalia.

== Home port assignments ==
The squadron was assigned to NAS Whidbey Island for all its time in service.

== Aircraft assignment ==
The squadron first received the following aircraft on the dates shown:

- KA-6D Intruder – 16 Nov 1987
- A-6E Intruder – Dec 1987

== See also ==
- Attack aircraft
- List of inactive United States Navy aircraft squadrons
- History of the United States Navy
