= Naval Base Commander, Clyde =

British Royal Navy appointment

- Incumbent; Commodore Sharon Malkin since December 2022
- Navy Department (1967-1997) Navy Command (2010-current)
- Abbreviation: NBC (C)
- Reports to: Director Naval Support
- Formation: August 1967
- First holder: Commodore Derrick G. Kent

The Naval Base Commander, Clyde also known as the Commodore, Clyde Submarine Base is a senior British Royal Navy appointment first established in August 1967. The office holder is responsible for the command and administration of His Majesty's Naval Base Clyde.

== History ==
The office was first created August 1967 with Commodore Derrick G. Kent being the first incumbent appointed. The post holder reported to the Assistant Chief of the Naval Staff (Support) from December 2011 to January 2018. The post of ACNS (Support) has been renamed to Director of Naval Support to which this officer currently reports to.

== Office Holders ==
Included:

- Commodore Derrick G. Kent: August 1967 – May 1969
- Commodore Peter G. La Niece: May 1969 – February 1971
- Commodore Peter E.C. Berger: February 1971 – August 1973
- Commodore Anthony J. Cooke: August 1973 – October 1975
- Commodore Alan J. Leahy: October 1975 – May 1978
- Commodore Colin N. MacEacharn: May 1978 – October 1980
- Commodore George M.F. Vallings: October 1980 – October 1982
- Commodore David H. Morse: October 1982 – October 1984
- Commodore David Pentreath: October 1984 – June 1986
- Commodore Patrick B. Rowe: June 1986 – December 1988
- Commodore Robert N. Woodard: December 1988 – June 1990
- Commodore David A.J. Blackburn: June 1990 – 1992
- Commodore Stuart M. Tickner: 1992
- Commodore John A. Trewby: March 1992 – February 1994
- Commodore B. Brian Perowne: February 1994 – 1996
- Commodore Frederick G. Thompson: 1996–1999
- Commodore Richard J. Lord: 1999 – January 2001
- Commodore K. John Borley: January 2001 – June 2004
- Commodore Carolyn J. Stait: June 2004 – October 2007
- Commodore Christopher J. Hockley: October 2007 – January 2011
- Commodore Michael P. Wareham: January 2011 – September 2013
- Commodore Keith A. Beckett: September 2013 – October 2014
- Commodore A.Mark Adams: October 2014 – February 2016
- Commodore Mark E. Gayfer: February 2016 – June 2018
- Commodore Donald Doull: June 2018 – June 2021
- Commodore Bob Anstey: June 2021- December 2022
- Commodore Sharon Malkin: December 2022 - Present
