= 738 Naval Air Squadron =

Inactive flying squadron of the Royal Navy's Fleet Air Arm

- Squadron badge
- Active: 1943–1945; 1950–1954; 1954–1970
- Disbanded: 5 May 1970
- Country: United Kingdom
- Branch: Royal Navy
- Type: Fleet Air Arm Second Line Squadron
- Role: Pilot Training Squadron; Naval Air Fighter School; Naval Air Fighter and Strike School; Advancd Fighter Training Squadron
- Size: Squadron
- Part of: Fleet Air Arm: 52nd Training Air Group (February 1950 - August 1951)
- Home station: See Naval air stations section for full list.
- Mottos: Parare bellum (Latin for 'Prepare for war')
- Aircraft: See Aircraft flown section for full list.

Commanders
- Notable commanders: Commander Peter Carmichael, OBE, DSC, RN; Captain Alan Leahy, CBE, DSC, RN; Captain Fred Hefford OBE, DSC, AFC, RN

Insignia
- Squadron Badge Description: Blue, a foul anchor erect gold in front of a flash of lightning in bend white overall surmounted by a Pegasus courant also white ( 1944)
- Identification Markings: 1BA+ then 1V17 to 20V17(Avenger); B1W+ (Harvard); 2B-1+ then 2BA+ (Martlet/Wildcat); 3BA+ (Corsair); 161-189 (Seafire); 180-183 (Firebrand); 450-457 (Sea Hornet); 100-149 (Sea Fury FB.11), 200-207 (Sea Fury T.20) (from May 1950); 100-149 (Sea Fury FB.11/Sea Hawk), 200-212 (Sea Fury T.20/Sea Vampire T.22) (from November 1953); 629-656 (all types) (January 1956); 785-795 (Hunter) (July 1956)
- Fin Shore Codes: CW (Seafire, Firebrand & Sea Hornet); CW:CU (Sea Fury from May 1950); LM (Sea Fury, Sea Hawk & Sea Vampire from November 1953); LM:BY (all types from January 1956); BY (Hunter from July 1965)

738 Naval Air Squadron (738 NAS) was a Fleet Air Arm (FAA) naval air squadron of the United Kingdom’s Royal Navy (RN), which last disbanded during May 1970 at HMS Goldcrest, RNAS Brawdy. It initially formed as a Pilot Training Squadron formed at HMS Asbury, RNAS Quonset Point, Rhode Island, in February 1943. The squadron moved to RNAS Lewiston, Maine, United States, at the end of July 1943 and also providing advanced carrier training to American-trained Royal Naval Volunteer Reserve (RNVR) pilots and it later provided complete Torpedo Bomber Reconnaissance (TBR) aircrew for Grumman Avenger FAA squadrons. The squadron moved to RNAS Brunswick, Maine, in February 1945 and disbanded there in July 1945. 738 Naval Air Squadron was next active as part of the Naval Air Fighter School, between May 1950 and March 1954, providing newly qualified FAA pilots the operational techniques of air-to-air and air-to-ground firing. It had formed at HMS Seahawk, RNAS Culdrose, Cornwall, England, moving to HMS Fulmar, RNAS Lossiemouth in 1953. It reformed in April 1954 at HMS Fulmar and now the squadron’s role was to instruct United States trained pilots on the British method and was also responsible for converting the FAA piston-engined pilots onto jet aircraft. It became an Advanced Flying Training Squadron in June 1962 providing training for low-level navigation, ground attack and air-to-air weapons training.

== History ==
=== Pilot Training Squadron (1943–1945) ===
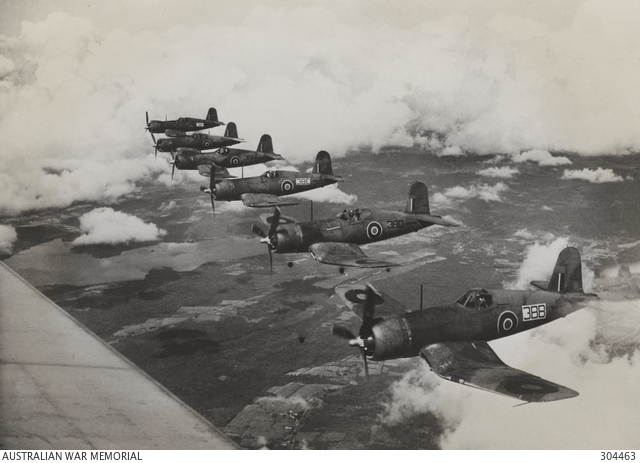
Six Vought Corsair Mk I and II of 738 Naval Air Squadron airborne over Maine from their US NAS Lewiston base during 1944

738 Naval Air Squadron formed at RNAS Quonset Point (HMS Asbury), Rhode Island, United States, on 1 February 1943 as a Pilot Training Squadron. Quonset Point was a United States Naval Base loaned to the Admiralty from 1 October 1942 and commissioned as HMS Asbury. It was used by the Royal Navy for forming and working up Fleet Air Arm squadrons, operating with American aircraft supplied under the Lend-Lease agreement, although it later recommissioned as HMS Saker II, on 13 March 1943. It was equipped with a mixture of Vought Corsair, an American carrier-based fighter-bomber aircraft, Grumman Martlet, an American carrier-based fighter aircraft (the Grumman F4F Wildcat was initially known as the Martlet in Royal Navy service) and North American Harvard, an American single-engined advanced trainer aircraft.

On 31 July 1943 the squadron moved to RNAS Lewiston, Maine, United States, a U.S. Naval Auxiliary Air Facility (NAAF) loaned to the Admiralty from 1 August 1943, to teach advanced aircraft carrier landing techniques to United States Navy flight school trained, Fleet Air Arm pilots. Here the squadron received Grumman Avenger, an American torpedo bomber, and Torpedo Bomber Reconnaissance aircrews were then also trained up enabling complete crews for FAA Grumman Avenger equipped squadrons. On 14 February 1945, 738 Naval Air Squadron moved to RNAS Brunswick, Maine, another U.S. Naval Air Station loaned for use to the Admiralty, from August 1943. The squadron remained for a further five months before disbanding on 31 July 1945.

=== Naval Air Fighter School (1950–1962) ===
On 1 May 1950, 738 Naval Air Squadron reformed at RNAS Culdrose (HMS Seahawk), Cornwall, England, from 736 Naval Air Squadron, and became a part of the Naval Air Fighter School, controlled by the 52nd Training Air Group. It was equipped with Supermarine Seafire F Mk XVII and F Mk 46, a navalised version of the Supermarine Spitfire fighter aircraft and Hawker Sea Fury F.10, FB.11 and T.20, fighter, fighter-bomber and trainer aircraft respectively. Its role was to take newly qualified FAA pilots and instruct them in the techniques of air-to-air combat and air-to-ground firing. In August 1951, part of the squadron became 759 Naval Air Squadron and an ‘A’ Flight was formed out of Hawker Sea Fury aircraft from 736 Naval Air Squadron. This flight provided air-to-air instruction and ‘B’ Flight ground attack training.

738 Naval Air Squadron moved to RNAS Lossiemouth (HMS Fulmar), Moray, Scotland on 9 November 1953, but disbanded on 24 March 1954 only to reform again nine days later, still at RNAS Lossiemouth, on 3 April. The following month saw the squadron receive both Hawker Sea Hawk F1 a British single-seat jet day fighter and de Havilland Sea Vampire T.22, a two-seat trainer variant of the jet fighter aircraft, with the squadron’s role to instruct United States trained pilots on the British method and was responsible for converting the FAA piston-engined pilots onto jet powered aircraft.

April 1954, until it moved to RNAS Yeovilton (HMS Heron) in 1956, saw the Command Instrument Grading and Examination Flight attached to 738 Naval Air Squadron. The de Havilland Sea Vampire aircraft were withdrawn from squadron use in March 1955 and it received more Hawker Sea Hawk aircraft, transferred over from 736 Naval Air Squadron. In 1957 the then squadron commanding officer, Lieutenant Commander Alan J. Leahy, DSC, RN, formed an aerobatic demonstration team, to display at that years Society of British Aircraft Constructors Farnborough Airshow. The team used the name The Red Devils and consisted five Hawker Sea Hawk FB.3 (Fighter-bomber variant) aircraft, each painted red with Royal Navy in large, white letters under the wings. The squadron’s engineers made alterations which enabled the aircraft to produce coloured smoke.

During the rest of the decade, the squadron lost (December 1958), and then later regained (June 1960, again from 736 Naval Air Squadron), Hawker Sea Hawk aircraft, but it took the de Havilland Sea Venom FAW.21, a carrier-capable jet fighter-bomber aircraft, used as an all-weather interceptor aircraft by the FAA, for all weather fighter training from October 1957 until September 1960, and later provided the Sea Venom Operational Flying School Parts I and II. The Squadron became the Naval Air Fighter School in 1958 when the parent formation was renamed the Naval Air Fighter and Strike School and it kept this role until 1962 when it retired its Hawker Sea Hawk FGA.6 aircraft and then became known as the Advanced Training Squadron.

=== Advanced Training Squadron (1962–1970) ===
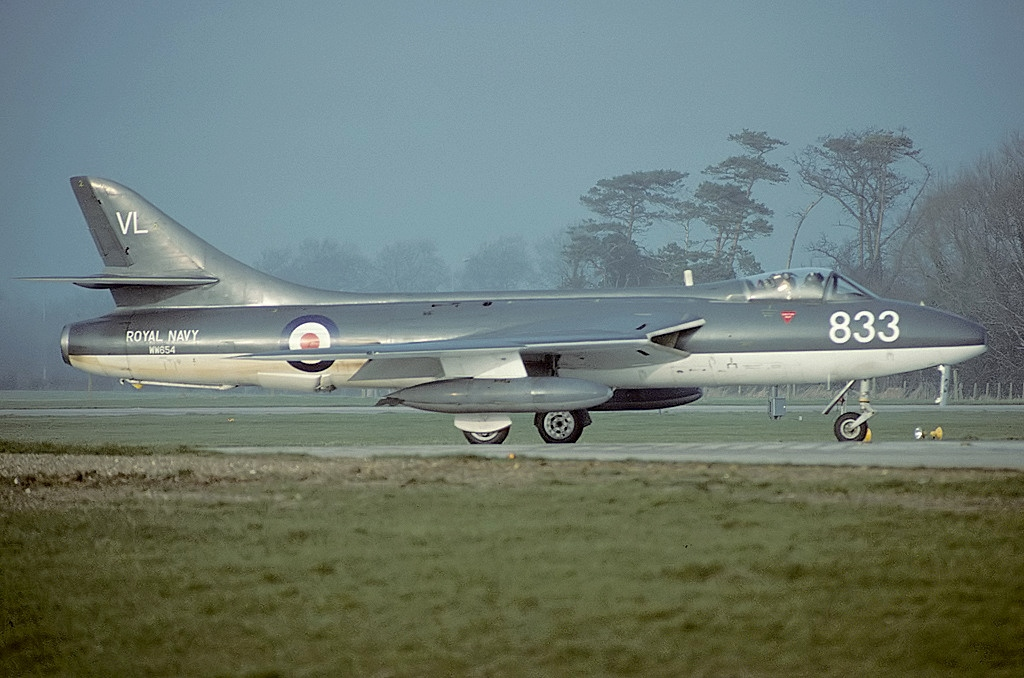
Hawker Hunter GA.11 'WW654' which served with 738 Naval Air Squadron

In line with its new role, Hawker Hunter T.8, a two-seat jet trainer for the RN, fitted with an arrestor hook for use on RN airfields, and Hawker Hunter GA.11, a single-seat weapons training version for the RN (converted F.4 fitted with an arrester hook), began to arrive at RNAS Lossiemouth during June 1962. Commanded by Lieutenant Commander F. Hefford, DSC, RN, 738 Naval Air Squadron’s tasks included low-level navigation, ground attack and air-to-air weapons training. On 6 January 1964, 738 Naval Air Squadron relocated to RNAS Brawdy (HMS Goldcrest) in Pembrokeshire, Wales, where it operated as phase 2 of the Advanced Flying Training course, giving tuition on fighter tactics and weapons release to students graduating out of 759 Naval Air Squadron, which was also based at RNAS Brawdy.

Using three Hawker Hunter GA.11 aircraft and a single Hawker Hunter T.8 two-seat trainer aircraft, a Fleet Air Arm aerobatic team was formed from 738 Naval Air Squadron, led by Lieutenant Commander Chris Comins, RN, whilst at RNAS Brawdy (HMS Goldcrest). The team was known as the Rough Diamonds and were operational from 1965, disbanding in 1969. The aircraft were painted in the standard Fleet Air Arm colour scheme of Extra Dark Sea Grey on top, over a White underside, however, the lead aircraft also had a dayglo red nose cone-band, fuselage spine and wing tips. All aircraft carried 'BY' for Brawdy on both sides of the tail and a 'Pegasus' on both sides of the nose, for 738 Naval Air Squadron.

738 Naval Air Squadron was disbanded on 5 May 1970 and the Hawker Hunter aircraft were absorbed into the fleets of the other Squadrons.

== Aircraft flown ==
The squadron has flown a number of different aircraft types, including:

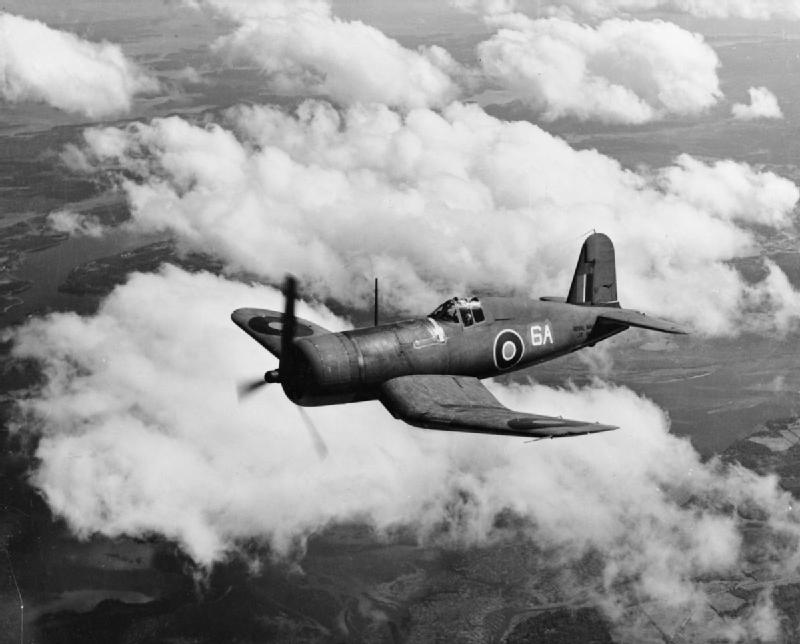
Vought Corsair

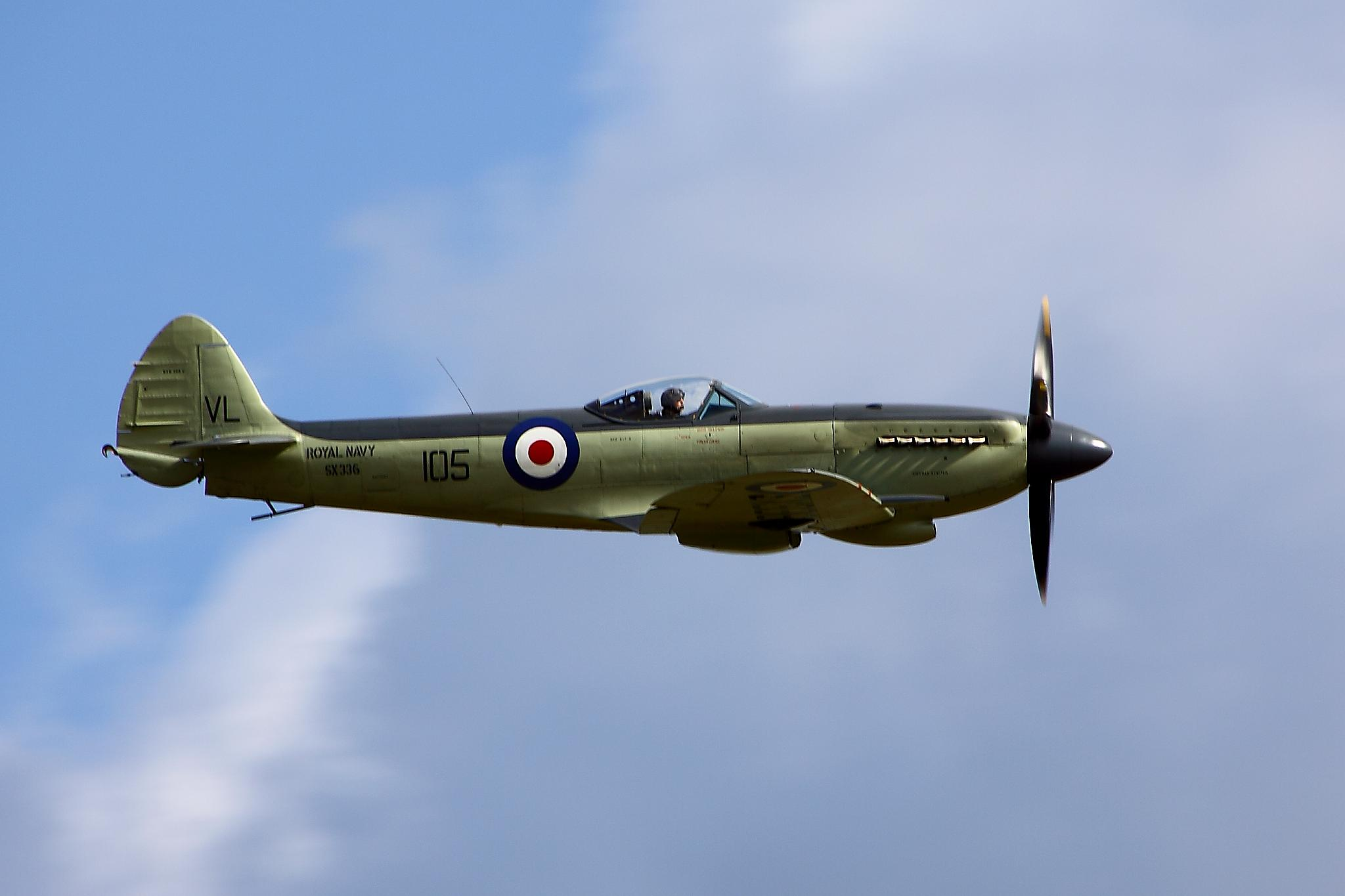
Supermarine Seafire F Mk XVII

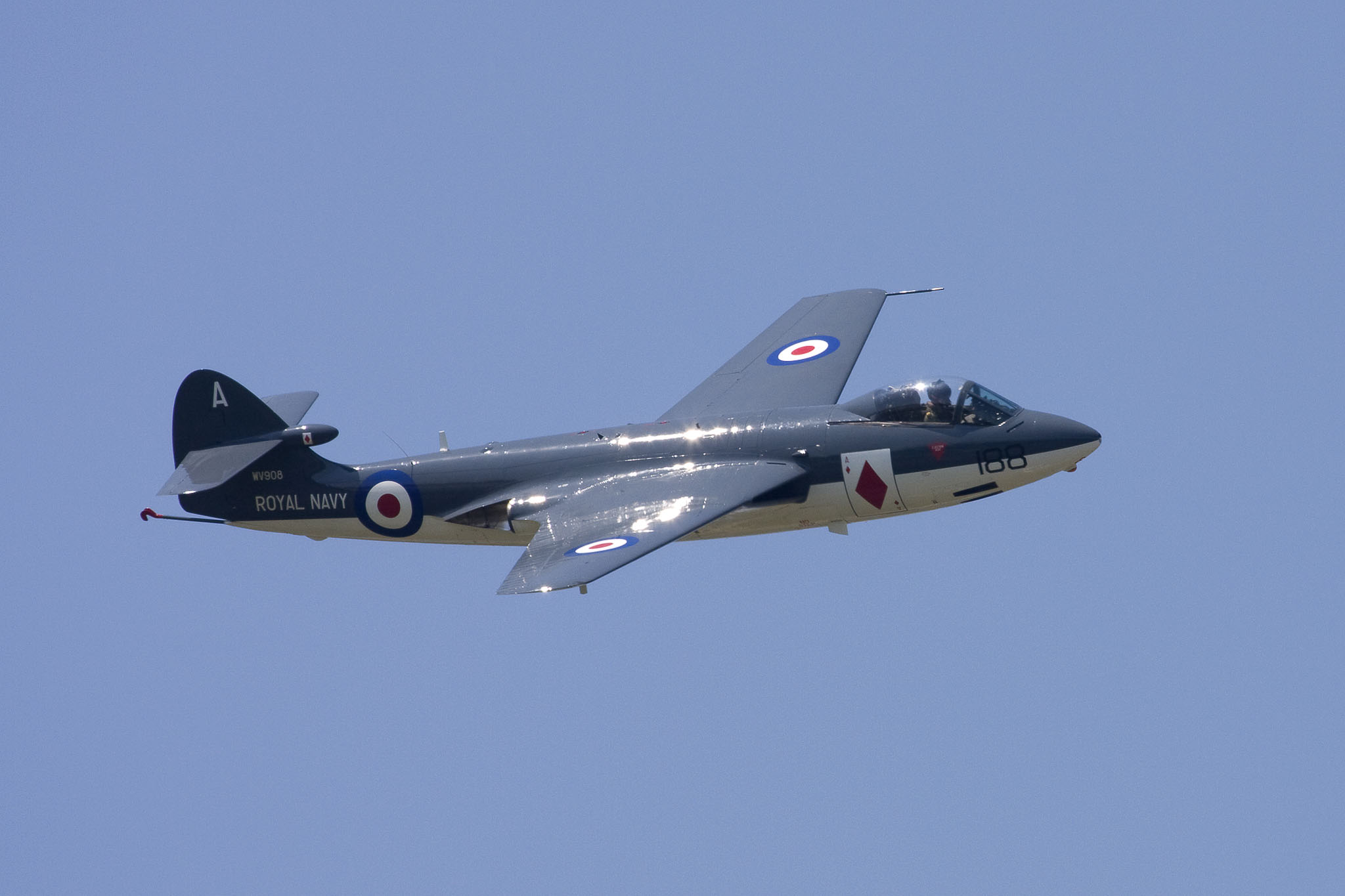
Hawker Sea Hawk FGA 6

- Vought Corsair Mk I fighter-bomber (February 1943 - July 1945)
- North American Harvard III advanced trainer aircraft (February 1943 - July 1945)
- Grumman Martlet Mk I fighter aircraft (April 1943 - )
- Grumman Wildcat Mk V fighter aircraft (June 1943 - January 1944)
- Grumman Tarpon GR.1 torpedo bomber (June 1943 - May 1945)
- Grumman Martlet Mk IV fighter aircraft (September 1943 - February 1944)
- Grumman Avenger Mk.II torpedo bomber (December 1943 - May 1945)
- Grumman Avenger Mk.III torpedo bomber (April - May 1945)
- Grumman Gosling Mk.I amphibious aircraft (July 1944 - March 1945)
- Vought Corsair Mk II fighter-bomber (July 1944 - July 1945)
- Supermarine Seafire F Mk 46 fighter aircraft (May - August 1950)
- Blackburn Firebrand T.F. IV strike fighter (May 1950 - August 1951)
- Supermarine Seafire F Mk XVII fighter aircraft (May 1950-August 1951)
- Hawker Sea Fury F.10 fighter aircraft (May 1950 - August 1951)
- de Havilland Sea Hornet F.20 fighter aircraft (May 1950 - August 1951)
- de Havilland Sea Hornet PR.22 photo-reconnaissance aircraft (May 1950 - August 1951)
- Hawker Sea Fury FB.11 fighter-bomber (May 1950 - March 1955)
- Hawker Sea Fury T.20 trainer aircraft (May 1950 - March 1955)
- Hawker Sea Hawk F1 day fighter aircraft (May 1954 - April 1957)
- de Havilland Vampire T.22 jet trainer aircraft (May 1954 - March 1955, December 1958 - September 1962)
- Hawker Sea Hawk F2 day fighter aircraft (March 1955 - March 1957)
- Hawker Sea Hawk FB 3 fighter-bomber (March 1955 - June 1958)
- Hawker Sea Hawk FGA 4 fighter ground attack aircraft (October 1955 - December 1958)
- de Havilland Sea Venom FAW.21 fighter aircraft (October 1957 - September 1960)
- Hawker Sea Hawk FGA 6 fighter ground attack aircraft (June 1960 - July 1962)
- Hawker Hunter GA.11 fighter ground attack aircraft (June 1962 - May 1970)
- Hawker Hunter T.8 jet trainer aircraft (June 1962 - May 1970)

== Naval air stations and other airbases ==
738 Naval Air Squadron operated from a number of naval air stations of the Royal Navy, a number of Royal Navy aircraft carriers and airbases overseas:

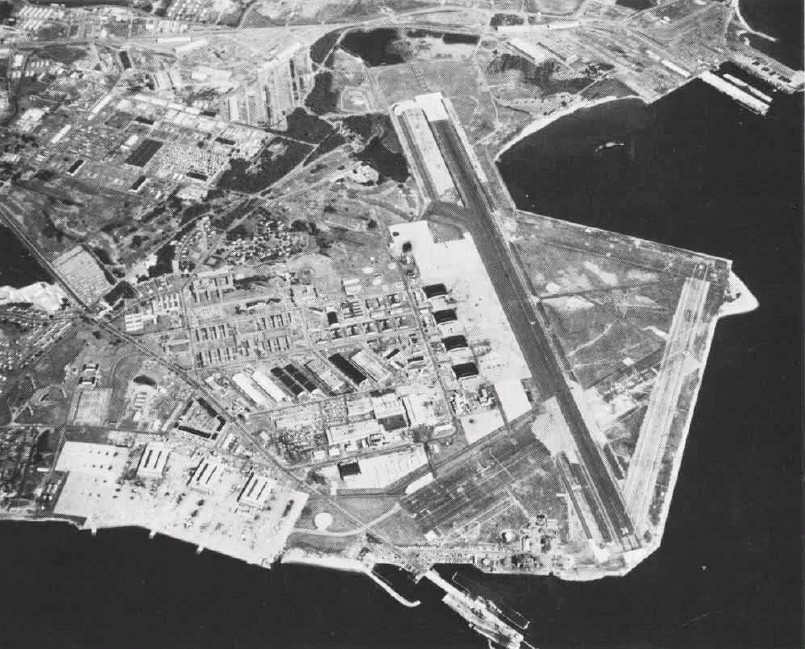
NAS Quonset Point (RNAS Quonset Point HMS Asbury / Saker II

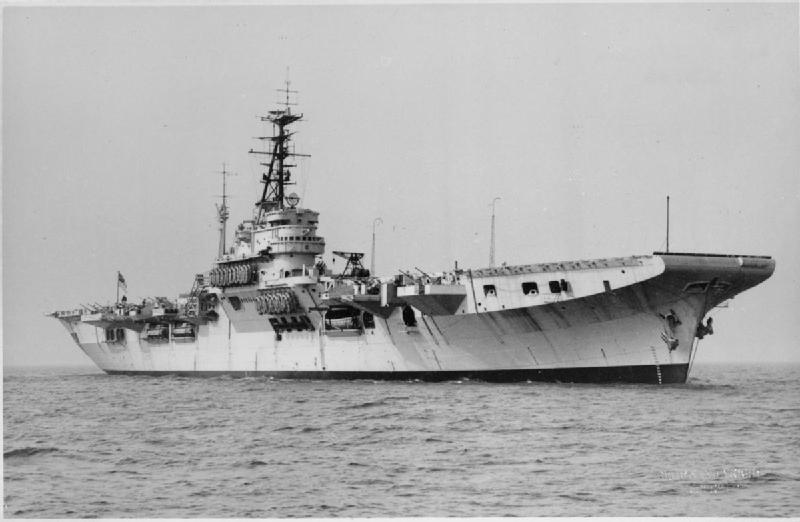
HMS Triumph

1943 - 1945

- Royal Naval Air Station Quonset Point (HMS Asbury / Saker II), Rhode Island, (1 February 1943 - 31 July 1943)
- Royal Naval Air Station Lewiston, Maine, (31 July 1943 - 14 February 1945)
  - RN Air Section Norfolk, Virginia, (Detachment 2 - 14 January 1945)
- Royal Naval Air Station Brunswick, Maine, (14 February 1945 - 31 July 1945)
  - RN Air Section Norfolk, Virginia, (Detachment 6 - 8 June 1945)
- disbanded - (31 July 1945)

1950 - 1954

- Royal Naval Air Station Culdrose (HMS Seahawk), Cornwall, (1 May 1950 - 12 January 1953)
  - Deck Landing Training
    - HMS Vengeance (28 January - 9 February 1951)
    - HMS Triumph (18 - 27 July 1951)
    - HMS Triumph (22 - 30 October 1951)
    - HMS Triumph (10 - 13 December 1951)
    - HMS Illustrious (1 - 12 February 1952)
    - HMS Triumph (11 - 22 May 1952)
    - HMS Illustrious (21 - 24 July 1952)
    - HMS Triumph (19 - 27 October 1952)
    - HMS Triumph (2 - 11 February 1953)
    - HMS Illustrious (13 - 20 March 1953)
    - HMS Illustrious (10 - 19 May 1953)
    - HMS Illustrious (12 - 21 July 1953)
    - HMS Illustrious (26 October - 4 November 1953)
    - HMS Illustrious (15 - 23 February 1954)
    - HMS Illustrious (20 - 23 September 1954)
  - Advanced Dummy Deck Landings
    - RNAS Predannack, Cornwall, (to 12 January 1953)
- Royal Naval Air Station St Merryn (HMS Vulture), Cornwall, (12 January 1953 - 9 November 1953)
- Royal Naval Air Station Lossiemouth (HMS Fulmar), Moray, (9 November 1953 - 23 March 1954)
- disbanded - (23 March 1954)

1954 - 1970

- Royal Naval Air Station Lossiemouth (HMS Fulmar), Moray, (3 April 1954 - 6 January 1964)
  - Royal Naval Air Station Brawdy (HMS Goldcrest), Pembrokeshire, (Detachment six aircraft 23 - 30 June 1960)
- Royal Naval Air Station Brawdy (HMS Goldcrest), Pembrokeshire, (6 January 1964 - 5 May 1970)
  - Royal Naval Air Station Yeovilton (HMS Heron), Somerset, (Detachment five aircraft 22 - 28 May 1964)
- disbanded - (5 May 1970)

== Commanding officers ==
List of commanding officers of 738 Naval Air Squadron, with date of appointment:

1943 - 1945

- Lieutenant Commander J.C. Reed, RN, from 1 February 1943
- Lieutenant Commander(A) J.P. Flood, RNVR, from 24 October 1944
- Lieutenant Commander(A) J.L. Cullen, RN, from 16 March 1945
- disbanded - 31 July 1945

1950 - 1954

- Lieutenant Commander S.F.F. Shotton, RN, from 1 May 1950
- Lieutenant Commander S.A. Mearns, DSC, RN, from 19 January 1951
- Lieutenant H.J. Abraham, RN, from 12 July 1951 (Lieutenant Commander 1 October 1952)
- Lieutenant Commander L.T. Summerfield, RN, from 23 June 1953
- disbanded - 24 March 1954

1954 - 1970

- Lieutenant Commander J. Robertson, RN, from 3 April 1954 (KiFA 28 September 1954)
- Lieutenant Commander P. Carmichael, DSC, RN, from 29 September 1954
- Lieutenant Commander D.B. Morison, RN, from 5 January 1955
- Lieutenant Commander A.J. Leahy, DSC, RN, from 17 May 1956
- Lieutenant Commander R.J. McCandless, DSC, RN, from 7 February 1958
- Lieutenant Commander D. Monsell, RN, from 5 October 1959
- Lieutenant Commander F. Hefford, DSC, RN, from 5 July 1961
- Lieutenant Commander J.W. Beard, RN, from 17 December 1962
- Lieutenant Commander J.W. Moore, RN, from 26 June 1964
- Lieutenant Commander C.A.M. Comins, RN, from 28 March 1966
- Lieutenant Commander J.F. Hall, RN, from 26 July 1967
- Lieutenant Commander N.G. Grier-Rees, RN, from 2 December 1968
- disbanded - 5 May 1970

Note: Abbreviation (A) signifies Air Branch of the RN or RNVR.

== See also ==
- Royal Navy and Fleet Air Arm aerobatic teams
