= Red Devils display team =

Aerobatics display team of the Royal Navy

Red Devils
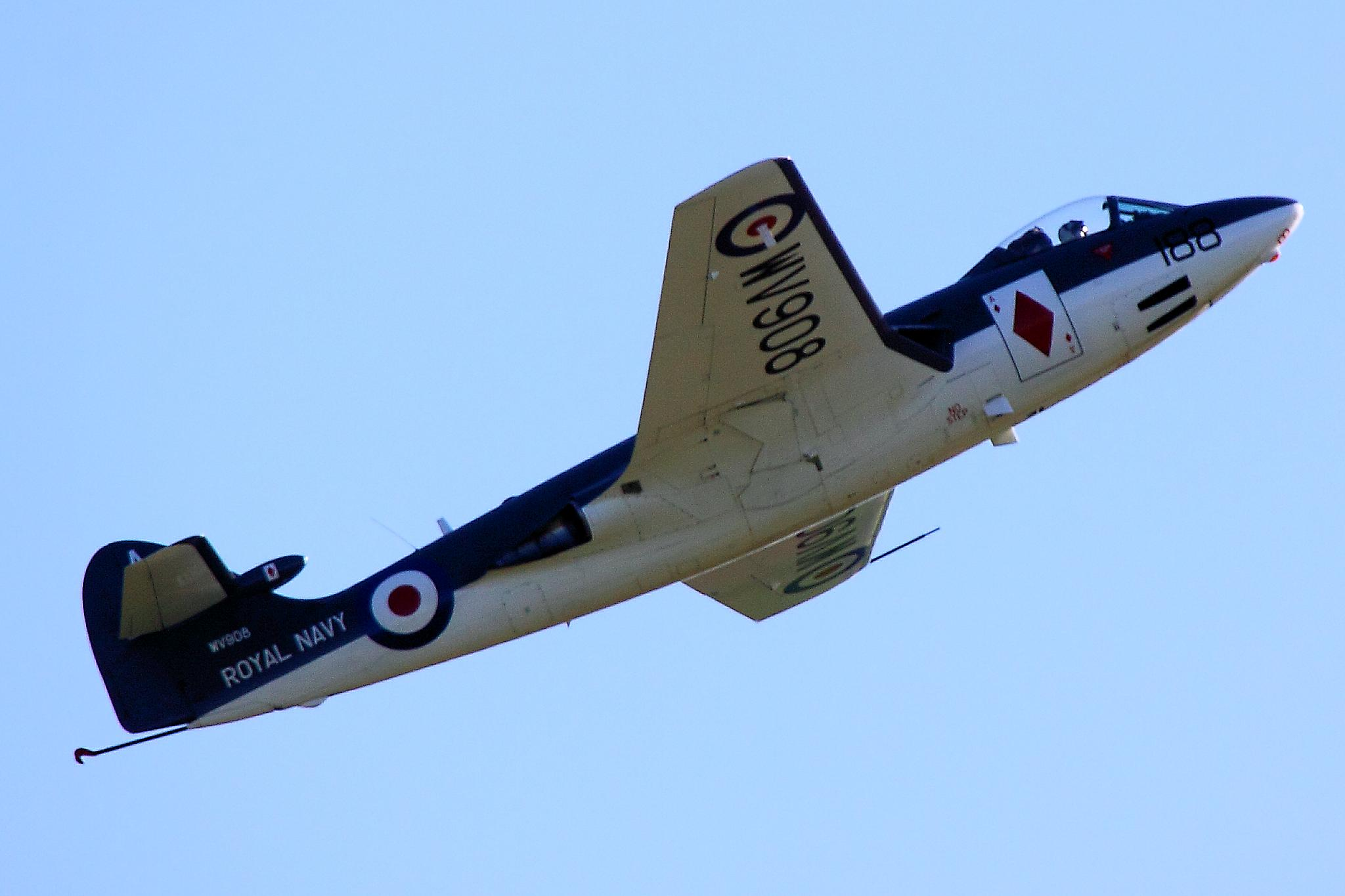
- Hawker Sea Hawk; an example of the aircraft used by the Red Devils
- Active: 1957
- Disbanded: 1957
- Country: United Kingdom
- Branch: Royal Navy
- Type: Aerobatic display team
- Role: Public display / formation aerobatics
- Size: Five aircraft
- Part of: 738 Naval Air Squadron
- Home station: RNAS Lossiemouth
- Aircraft: Hawker Sea Hawk FB.3

Commanders
- Team leader: Lieutenant Commander Alan J. "Spiv" Leahy

Red Devils was a Royal Navy Fleet Air Arm aerobatic display team formed from 738 Naval Air Squadron in 1957. The team flew five red-painted Hawker Sea Hawk FB.3s and performed at the 1957 Society of British Aircraft Constructors (SBAC) air display at Farnborough and other air displays during the 1957 season. The team was disbanded at the end of the season.

== History ==
=== Formation ===
The team was formed in 1957 from 738 Naval Air Squadron, which was based at RNAS Lossiemouth. It operated five Sea Hawk FB.3 fighter bomber aircraft painted red for display purposes.

The name Red Devils is documented in contemporary aviation coverage. An article by J. Stevens in the October 1957 issue of Air Pictorial, covering the 1957 SBAC display, included a photograph captioned "The Red Devils" and identified the formation as five Sea Hawks of No. 738 Fleet Air Arm Squadron performing a smoke-trailing "up, down and over" manoeuvre. The team was also subsequently described as the "Red Devils" in specialist histories of the Sea Hawk.

There is evidence that the formation was also referred to as the "Red Hawks". Former Fleet Air Arm pilot Brian Toomey recalled in 2021 that the 738 Squadron aerobatic team was known as the "Red Hawks", although he noted that some people called it the "Red Devils". The contemporary Air Pictorial usage establishes "Red Devils" as a name used during the 1957 display season.

=== 1957 display season ===
The Red Devils appeared at the 1957 SBAC air display at Farnborough. Contemporary Air Pictorial coverage described the five-aircraft formation performing the smoke-trailing "up, down and over" manoeuvre. Francis K. Mason subsequently described the five scarlet Sea Hawks as performing a formation aerobatic routine using coloured smoke, including close-formation take-offs and landings.

The team also appeared at other air displays during the 1957 season. A programme for the RAF Thornaby, North Yorkshire, "At Home" display on 14 September 1957 recorded a four-aircraft Sea Hawk flypast by 738 Squadron from RNAS Lossiemouth, Moray; later research into the surviving programme identifies the aircraft with the Red Devils display team. Toomey recalled that he and Lieutenant Commander Tom Leece took part in 17 air displays by the Navy's Red Devils during 1957.

=== Pilots ===
Toomey's account identifies the five pilots who formed the principal formation as Lieutenant Commander Alan J. "Spiv" Leahy, Lieutenant Commander Tom Leece, Lieutenant Colin Casperd, Lieutenant Brian Wilson and Toomey himself.

Lieutenant Commander Dennis Kelly was the team's soloist. Kelly was killed on 26 August 1957 when his Sea Hawk failed to recover from a loop during a rehearsal at RNAS Ford, West Sussex. Lieutenant Terence Bourke subsequently replaced him as soloist.

=== Disbandment ===
The Red Devils operated during the 1957 display season and were disbanded at its conclusion. Later specialist accounts give RNAS Abbotsinch, Renfrewshire, as the location of the team's final display, but the exact date of that appearance has not been established from contemporary documentation.

For the 1958 SBAC display, the Fleet Air Arm display role was taken over by 800 Naval Air Squadron, which operated a seven-aircraft Sea Hawk formation. The aircraft were painted in their standard finish and fitted with smoke systems.

== Aircraft ==
The Red Devils flew five Hawker Sea Hawk FB.3s painted red for display purposes. The aircraft were modified to produce coloured smoke during their displays.

== See also ==
- 738 Naval Air Squadron
- Fleet Air Arm
- Royal Navy and Fleet Air Arm aerobatic teams

== Sources ==
- Bond, Steve (2021). Fleet Air Arm Boys: Volume Two: Strike, Anti-Submarine, Early Warning and Support Aircraft since 1945. London: Grub Street. ISBN 978-1-911667-17-9.
- Mason, Francis K. (1966). The Hawker Sea Hawk. Profile. Leatherhead: Profile Publications.
- Stevens, J. (October 1957). "S.B.A.C. 1957". Air Pictorial and Air Reserve Gazette. XIX (10): 44.
- Ships Illustrated: British Aircraft Carriers of WW2, p. 50.
