= VA-155 (U.S. Navy) =

Attack Squadron of the U.S. Navy

Attack Squadron 155
- Active: 26 March 1945 – 30 November 1949
- Country: United States
- Branch: United States Navy
- Type: Attack
- Nickname(s): Uninvited

Aircraft flown
- Attack: TBM Avenger; AD-2 Skyraider

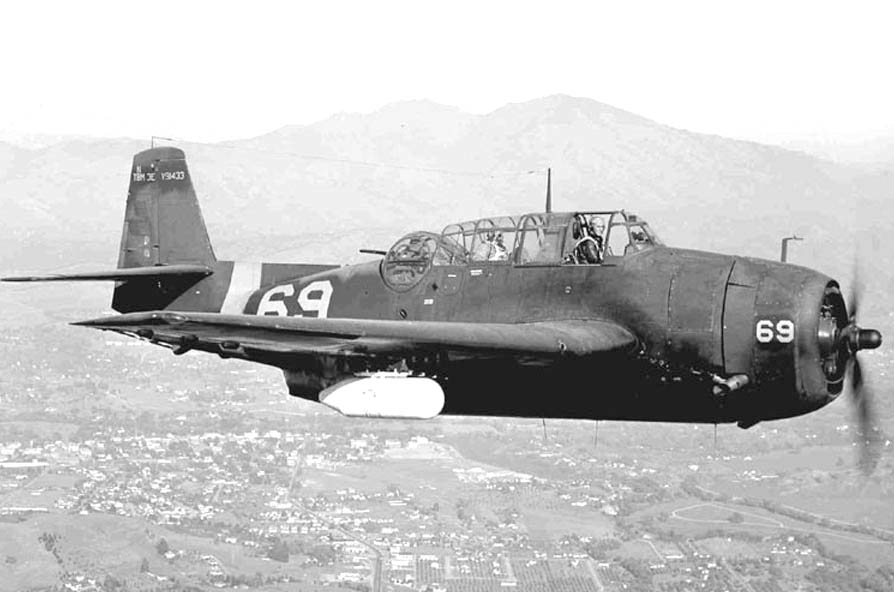
A TBM-3 Avenger torpedo bomber in flight. VA-155 flew several TBM variants.

VA-155 was an Attack Squadron of the United States Navy. It was established as Torpedo Squadron VT-153 on 26 March 1945. The squadron was redesignated as VA-16A on 15 November 1946, and finally designated as VA-155 on 15 July 1948. It was disestablished on 30 November 1949. Its nickname is unknown. It was the first squadron to be named VA-155, the second VA-155 was originally established in 1946, redesignated as VA-155 on 4 February 1953, and disestablished on 30 September 1977, while a third VA-155 was established on 1 September 1987 and disestablished on 30 April 1993.

During the squadron's deployment to the western Pacific from March to October 1947, three of its aircraft were equipped as antisubmarine warfare (ASW) planes, giving it an ASW mission as well as attack.

== Home port assignments ==
The squadron was assigned to these home ports, effective on the dates shown:

- NAAF Lewiston – 26 Mar 1945
- NAAS Oceana – 1 Jun 1945
- NAS Norfolk – 2 Jul 1946
- NAS Alameda – 8 Aug 1946
- NAS Whidbey Island – O1 Sep 1987

== Aircraft assignment ==
The squadron first received the following aircraft on the dates shown:

- TBM-3E Avenger – 30 Mar 1945
- TBM-3Q Avenger – Apr 1946
- TBM-3W Avenger – Apr 1947
- AD-2 Skyraider – 19 Jul 1948
- A-6E Intruder – 1 Sep 1987

== See also ==
- List of squadrons in the Dictionary of American Naval Aviation Squadrons
- Attack aircraft
- List of inactive United States Navy aircraft squadrons
- History of the United States Navy
