= John Templeton-Cotill =

Royal Navy Rear Admiral (1920-2011)

Rear-Admiral John Templeton-Cotill CB
- Born: 4 June 1920
- Died: 23 May 2011 (aged 90)
- Military career
- Allegiance: United Kingdom
- Branch: Royal Navy
- Rank: Rear-Admiral
- Commands: 23rd Escort Squadron; HMS Bulwark; Malta Dockyard
- Conflicts: World War II

Rear-Admiral John Atrill Templeton-Cotill CB (4 June 1920 – 23 May 2011) was a Royal Navy officer who became Flag Officer, Malta.

== History ==
Educated at Canford School and New College, Oxford, Templeton-Cotill joined the Royal Navy Volunteer Reserve in 1939 and served in the Second World War becoming flag lieutenant to the Flag officer, Malta and then first lieutenant in a motor torpedo boat. After the War he became naval attaché in Russia in May 1962, commander of the 23rd Escort Squadron and captain of the frigate HMS Rhyl in August 1964 and senior naval member of the Defence Operational Analysis Establishment at West Byfleet in 1966. He went on to be commanding officer of the aircraft carrier HMS Bulwark in May 1968, Chief of Staff, Far East Fleet in February 1970 and Flag Officer, Malta in July 1971. In retirement he became Director in the Paris office of Sotheby's.

Military offices
Preceded by Derrick Kent	Flag Officer, Malta; 1971–1973	Succeeded by David Loram
