= 809 Naval Air Squadron =

Flying squadron of the Royal Navy's Fleet Air Arm

809 Squadron
- Squadron badge
- Active: 1941–1946; 1949–1959; 1963–1965; 1966–1978; 1982; 2023–present
- Country: United Kingdom
- Branch: Royal Navy
- Type: Single-seat fighter squadron
- Role: Carrier-based fighter squadron; Carrier-based maritime strike
- Part of: Fleet Air Arm
- Home station: RAF Marham
- Motto: Immortal
- Aircraft: Lockheed Martin F-35B Lightning
- Battle honours: Arctic 1941; Malta Convoys 1942; North Africa 1942; Salerno 1943; South France 1944; Aegean 1944; Burma 1945; Falklands 1982

Commanders
- Current commander: Commander Nick Smith

Insignia
- Squadron Badge Description: Blue, a Phoenix wings displayed and addorsed langued red and inclined to profile gold arising from flames proper (1944)
- Identification Markings: 6A+ (Fulmar on HMS Victorious); SA+ (Seafire on HMS Stalker); D6A+ (Seafire from March 1945); 481-494 (Sea Hornet); 226-235 (Sea Venom); 220-229 (Sea Venom January 1956); 220-233 (Buccaneer January 1963); 320-327 (Buccaneer January 1966); 020-036 (Buccaneer January 1970); 250-257 (Sea Harrier)
- Fin Carrier/Shore Codes: CW:Q:A:J (Sea Hornet); O (Sea Venom); O:Z:A (Sea Venom January 1956); LM:R (Buccaneer January 1963); LM:H (Buccaneer January 1966); R (Buccaneer January 1970)

809 Naval Air Squadron (809 NAS), sometimes referred to as 809 Squadron, nicknamed Immortal, is a Fleet Air Arm (FAA) naval air squadron of the United Kingdom's Royal Navy (RN). It currently operates the Lockheed Martin F-35B Lightning aircraft from RAF Marham, Norfolk, having recommissioned in 2023. The unit is jointly composed of both Royal Navy and Royal Air Force (RAF) personnel and operates from Queen Elizabeth-class aircraft carriers.

It was first formed in 1941 and flew in the Soviet Union, the Mediterranean and the Far East during the Second World War. After active service during the Suez Crisis, 809 Squadron was disbanded in 1959. Reformed in 1963 to fly Blackburn Buccaneers, the squadron was disbanded briefly in 1965–66, and then again in 1978. A brief period during the Falklands War saw 809 Squadron reformed to bring Sea Harrier FRS.1 aircraft south to the UK task group and to fly from HMS Illustrious.

== History ==
=== Second World War ===
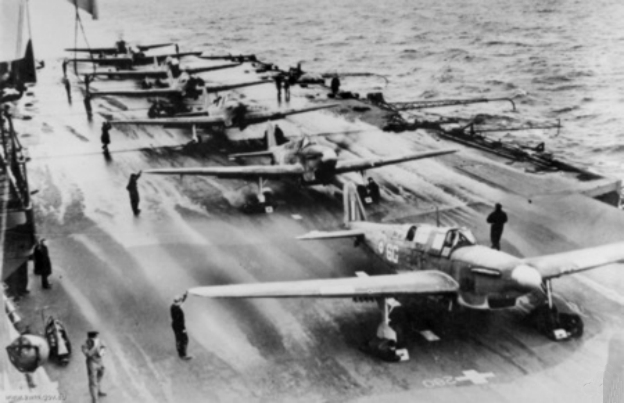
Fairey Fulmars of 809 Squadron aboard HMS Victorious in 1942

Formed on 15 January 1941 at RNAS St Merryn with 12 Fairey Fulmars, the squadron embarked in HMS Victorious in July 1941. At first involved in operations against Petsamo and Bodø, and then the convoys to North Russia, Victorious and her air group fought in the Mediterranean from July 1942, including participating in Operation Pedestal.

After being trained in army co-operation duties at Sawbridge, 809 re-embarked in Victorious in October 1942 and conducted tactical reconnaissance for the North African landings of Operation Torch. After being re-equipped with the Supermarine Seafire IIc, the squadron provided cover for Operation Avalanche, the allied landings at Salerno.

The squadron flew Seafires off HMS Stalker during 1944, including landing detachments in North Africa and Italy between May and July. Stalker and 809 formed part of Task Force 88 covering the Operation Dragoon landings in Southern France in August 1944. In November 1944 the squadron transferred to HMS Attacker, rejoining Stalker in March 1945, bound for the Eastern Fleet at Ceylon.

The final days of World War II saw 809 providing fighter cover for Operation Dracula, the re-occupation of Rangoon, then in June operations in British Malaya and Sumatra. The ship subsequently gave cover for Operation Zipper, the re-occupation of Malaya after V-J Day.

=== Sea Hornet (1949-1954) ===
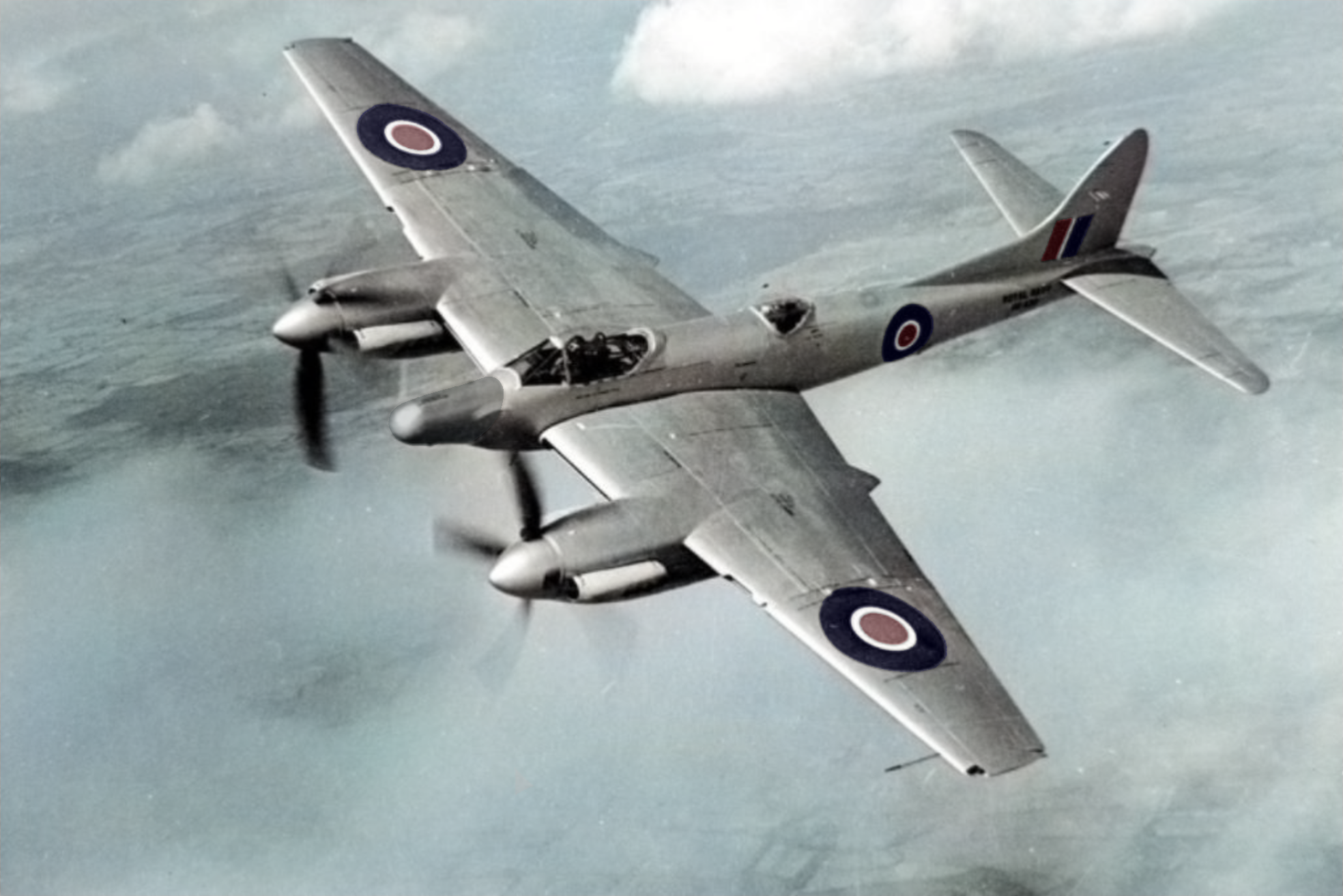
de Havilland Sea Hornet NF.21; an example of the type used by 809 Squadron

The De Havilland Sea Hornet NF.21 served as the standard night-fighter for the Fleet Air Arm (FAA) that operated from aircraft carriers from 1949 to 1954. Its advanced radar systems, along with the inclusion of a navigator, rendered it effective as a lead aircraft within strike formations. The Sea Hornet N.F.21 commenced its first-line operational service with 809 Squadron at RNAS Culdrose (HMS Seahawk), Cornwall, on 20 January 1949. This squadron was specifically re-established for the Sea Hornet night-fighter and was the sole first-line squadron to utilise this aircraft type. The initial deployment of Sea Hornet N.F.21s occurred with 809 Squadron aboard HMS Vengeance in May 1950, contributing to the FAA's inaugural All-Weather Air Group. The operational range of the N.F.21 was notably showcased in November 1951, when an aircraft from 809 Squadron completed a non-stop flight from Gibraltar to RNAS Lee-on-Solent (HMS Daedalus), Hampshire, at an average speed of 378 miles per hour (608 km/h).

Before joining HMS Vengeance as a member of the 15th Carrier Air Group with 814 Squadron, on 3 May 1950 the squadron conducted a flypast featuring seven de Havilland Sea Hornets, along with nine Hawker Sea Furies, and two Royal Naval Volunteer Reserve (RNVR) squadrons of Supermarine Seafires during the launch of HMS Ark Royal at Birkenhead. In August, the squadron merged with 792 Squadron, a Night Fighter training unit. Brief embarked periods occurred throughout 1950, and by May 1951, both squadrons were part of the 7th Carrier Air Group. However, operating twin-engine aircraft from carriers was difficult, leading to a three-month stay at RAF Coltishall, Norfolk, starting in August 1951. In January 1952, the squadron deployed to RNAS Hal Far in Malta, returning in March. In January 1953, 809 Squadron joined HMS Eagle for work-up and the spring cruise, returning for the Coronation Review flypast on 15 June. The squadron was disbanded at RNAS Culdrose on 10 May 1954.

=== Sea Venom (1954-1959) ===
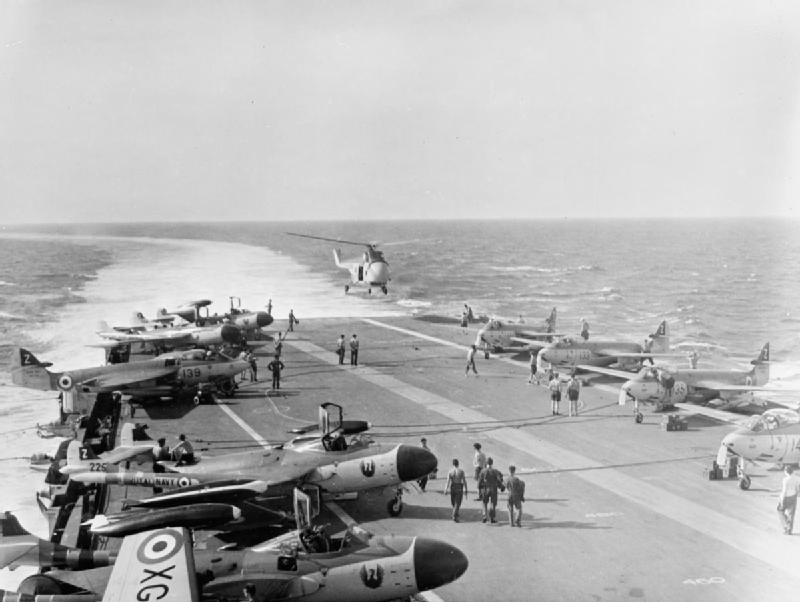
de Havilland Sea Venoms of 809 Squadron stand alongside Seahawks aboard HMS Albion in 1956

The de Havilland Sea Venom represented the Royal Navy's inaugural jet all-weather fighter, succeeding the Sea Hornet NF.21 on aircraft carriers in 1954. The initial production model, the Sea Venom FAW.20, took to the skies on 27 March 1953. This was subsequently followed in production by the FAW.21, which featured the enhanced de Havilland Ghost 104 engine, power-operated ailerons, American radar systems, and a clear-view frameless canopy. The second Fleet Air Arm Sea Venom squadron was 809, which had been the sole all-weather squadron of the FAA operating the Sea Hornet since 1949.

The squadron reassembled on the same day at RNAS Yeovilton (HMS Heron), Somerset, with nine Sea Venom FAW.20s designated for the all-weather fighter role and these were later replaced by nine Sea Venom FAW.21s. The squadron was planned to be assigned to HMS Ark Royal, however, issues with fractured deck hooks hindered this plan, leading to its deployment to Malta in November to participate in exercises in the Mediterranean. Four months later, the squadron returned home and disbanded at RNAS Yeovilton in March 1956.

On 7 May 1956, 809 reformed at RNAS Yeovilton, again with nine Sea Venom FAW.21s and in September it joined HMS Albion for the Mediterranean. In November the squadron participated in the Suez Crisis with attacks on Egyptian airfields as well as tanks and other military vehicles, just under 140 sorties being flown in all. In the New Year the squadron returned to the UK. Various cruises were subsequently undertaken, and from July 1958 the squadron spent a period in the Mediterranean before re-embarking in October for the Far East, with visits to both New Zealand and Australia in early 1959. In April 1959 cross-operations were carried out with USS Yorktown during a Southeast Asia Treaty Organization (SEATO) exercise before returning to Singapore. The carrier then sailed home and 809 disbanded on arrival on 17 August.

=== Buccaneer (1963-1978) ===
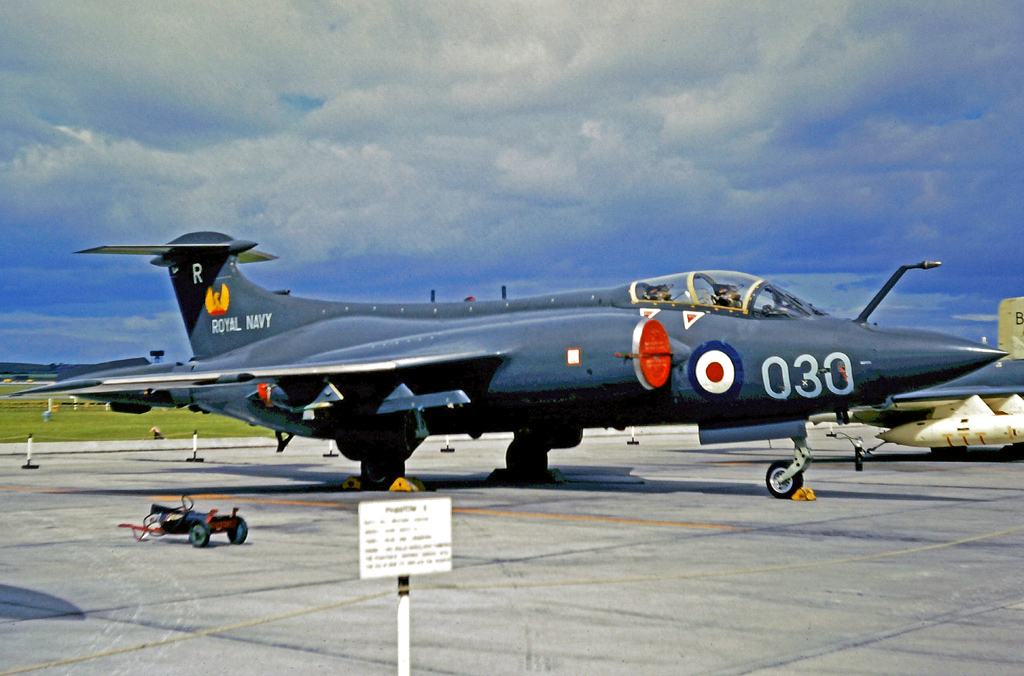
809 Squadron Buccaneer S.2, XN977, coded R-030 when serving aboard HMS Ark Royal in 1970

809 NAS re-formed on 15 January 1963 as the second frontline Blackburn Buccaneer S.1 squadron (after 801 NAS), using aircraft and crews from the recently disbanded 700Z NAS (the Buccaneer S.1 trials and training unit) under the command of 700Z's commanding officer, Commander 'Spiv' Leahy. The squadron was tasked with continuing 700Z's duties and became the Buccaneer Headquarters squadron. The aircraft at the time were painted in 'anti-flash' white with toned-down markings because of the Buccaneer's nuclear role, with the squadron badge of a phoenix on the sides of the jet intakes. By 1965 the Buccaneer force had switched to the standard Fleet Air Arm finish of dark sea grey upper surfaces and white undersides, and the squadron badge was moved to the tail. In April 1965, 809 NAS disbanded again and its role was taken over by 736 NAS at RNAS Lossiemouth.

809 re-formed in 1966 under the command of Lt Cdr Lyn Middleton and was now equipped with the Rolls-Royce Spey-powered Buccaneer S.2. Royal Navy Buccaneers were now being painted dark sea grey overall with all markings other than roundels in either light grey or light blue to reduce visibility. 809 embarked in HMS Hermes with six aircraft for the next two years, then from 1968 were shore-based again at Lossiemouth, during which time they formed a display team and attended many air shows.

In 1970, having increased its complement to 14 Buccaneer S.2s, 809 embarked in HMS Ark Royal and, from 1972 onward, became the last Royal Navy Buccaneer squadron following the disbandment of 800 Naval Air Squadron. In 1972, Ark Royal and 809 RNAS were despatched "with haste" from the North Atlantic to 'show presence' over British Honduras, now Belize, in the face of neighbouring Guatemalan threats to invade Belize. Steaming hard at 27 knots, and when eventually off Bermuda, two Buccaneers were launched along with two more buddy tanker versions to make one of the longest journeys of its type. In a six-hour round trip the two Buccaneers showed presence over Belize and made the Guatemalan government, with its P-51D Mustangs and limited ground forces, hesitate long enough for other events to intervene. Later the squadron transferred its home base from RNAS Lossiemouth (which was being transferred to Royal Air Force control, and later became the home base of the last RAF Buccaneer squadrons) to RAF Honington. 809 NAS continued to alternate between RAF Honington and Ark Royal until November 1978, when after flying off the carrier for the last time in the Mediterranean, the squadron flew direct to RAF St Athan, where the aircraft were formally handed over to the RAF. 809 Squadron was officially disbanded at HMS Daedalus on the 13 December 1978, and the aircraft were used to form the RAF's No. 216 Squadron in 1979.

=== Sea Harrier (1982) ===
The British Aerospace Sea Harrier represented a variant within a family of subsonic aircraft designed for vertical and/or short take-off and landing (V/STOL) capabilities. It was intended for multiple roles, such as strike missions, reconnaissance, and air combat. The aircraft entered service with the Royal Navy in June 1979, designated as the Sea Harrier FRS.1, and was commonly known as the 'Shar'. On 6 April 1982, 809 Naval Air Squadron was recommissioned as a front-line unit for the Sea Harrier, equipped with eight Sea Harrier FRS.1 aircraft at RNAS Yeovilton (HMS Heron) located in Somerset.

==== Falklands War ====
Sea Harrier of 809 NAS at Ascension Island in 1982

During the Falklands War of 1982, the Fleet Air Arm only had three Sea Harrier squadrons, 800 and 801 Naval Air Squadrons, with five aircraft each for front line operations from HMS Hermes and HMS Invincible and 899 Naval Air Squadron (training), with around twelve Sea Harriers operating as the headquarters and training squadron. At the outbreak of war, 899 sent three aircraft to join 801 aboard HMS Invincible and seven aircraft to join 800 aboard HMS Hermes. These aircraft sailed with the Falklands Task Force, whilst the remains of 899 set about bringing the remaining Sea Harriers in store or on other duties into operational use.

The following pilots were deployed with 809 Naval Air Squadron during the Falklands War in 1982:

- Lieutenant Commander Tim Gedge (Commanding Officer)
- Lieutenant Commander Dave Braithwaite
- Lieutenant Commander Alistair Craig
- Lieutenant Dave Austin

These officers formed part of the Sea Harrier FRS.1 contingent embarked aboard the SS Atlantic Conveyor and upon arrival in the South Atlantic, integrated into 800 and 801 Naval Air Squadrons aboard HMS Hermes and HMS Invincible.

It was planned to form a third front line squadron with ten Sea Harriers, but only eight could be brought together initially. These aircraft were painted a lighter low visibility grey than the rest of the Sea Harrier fleet, and were then issued to the reformed 809 Naval Air Squadron, under Lieutenant Commander Tim Gedge, which were transported south on the ill-fated SS Atlantic Conveyor. After arriving with the Task force, the aircraft and pilots were split between the two carriers and were absorbed by their squadrons, as 899's aircraft had been earlier. After the ceasefire, 809 re-formed as a single unit and returned to the UK aboard HMS Hermes, where after a very short break they embarked aboard the newly completed Illustrious and returned to the South Atlantic to provide air defence cover until Port Stanley Airport could be repaired. The squadron remained on station until relieved by RAF Phantom FGR2s of No. 29 Squadron based at Stanley. HMS Illustrious returned home in December, and 809 Naval Air Station finally disbanded on 17 December 1982.

=== F-35B Lightning (2023–present) ===
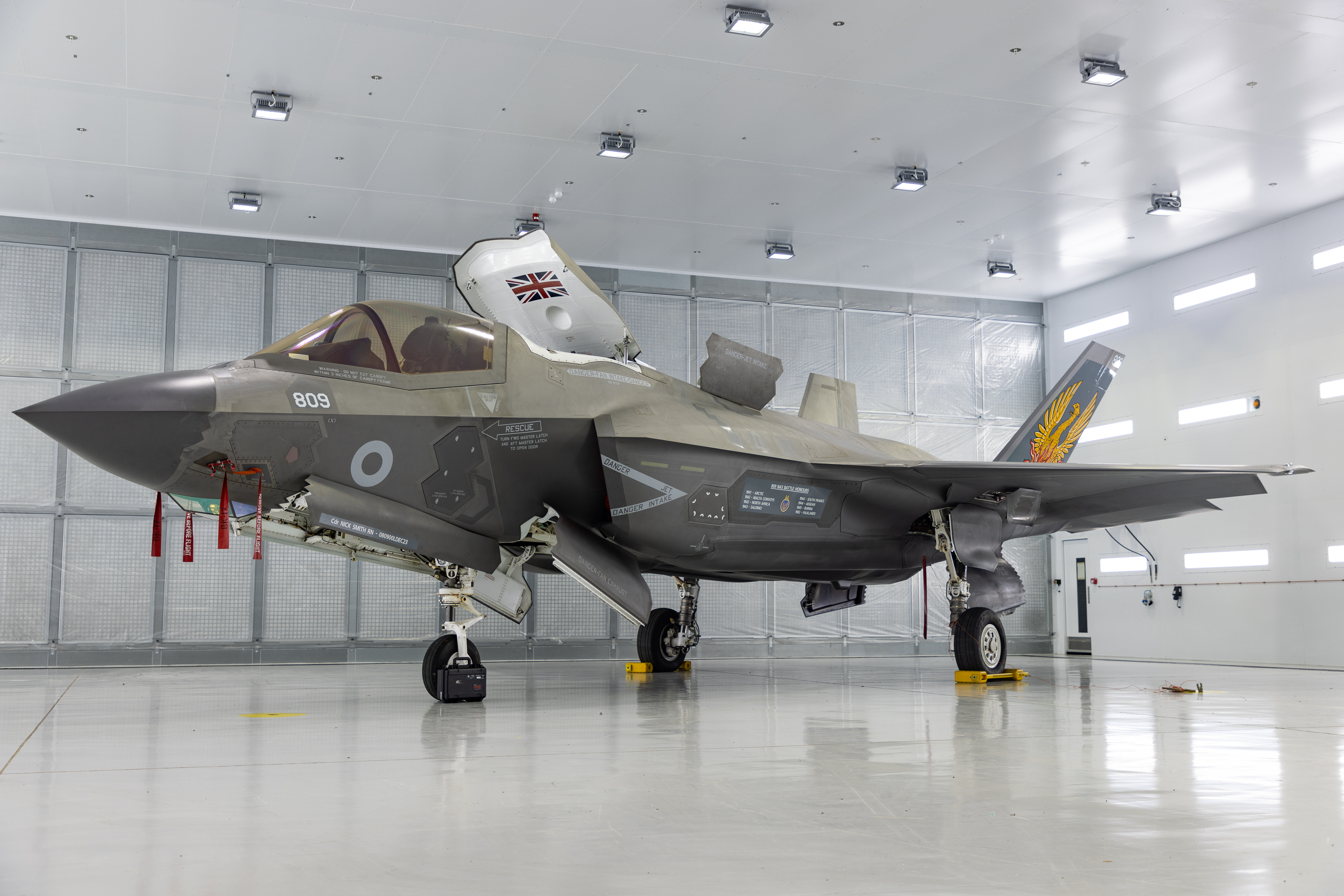
An F-35B Lightning II in 809 Squadron colours

In September 2013, it was announced that 809 NAS was to be reformed to become the first Fleet Air Arm squadron to be equipped with the Lockheed Martin F-35B Lightning. In 2016, it had been planned that the squadron would be recommissioned in April 2023 as the UK's second frontline F-35B squadron after No. 617 Squadron RAF, however this was delayed until later in 2023.

In September 2022, James Heappey, the Minister of State for the Armed Forces, stated that 809 NAS was "due to stand up in quarter two of 2023", with full operating capability expected in 2025. 809 NAS formally stood-up at RAF Marham, Norfolk, on 8 December 2023 and was expected to be "deployable" in 2025. Initial operating capability was anticipated by 1 December 2024. On 1 October 2024, it was announced that F-35B aircraft from 809 NAS had deployed to HMS Prince of Wales in the North Sea for a month's intensive training; the first time for nearly fifteen years that Royal Navy fast jets had operated from a Royal Navy aircraft carrier at sea.

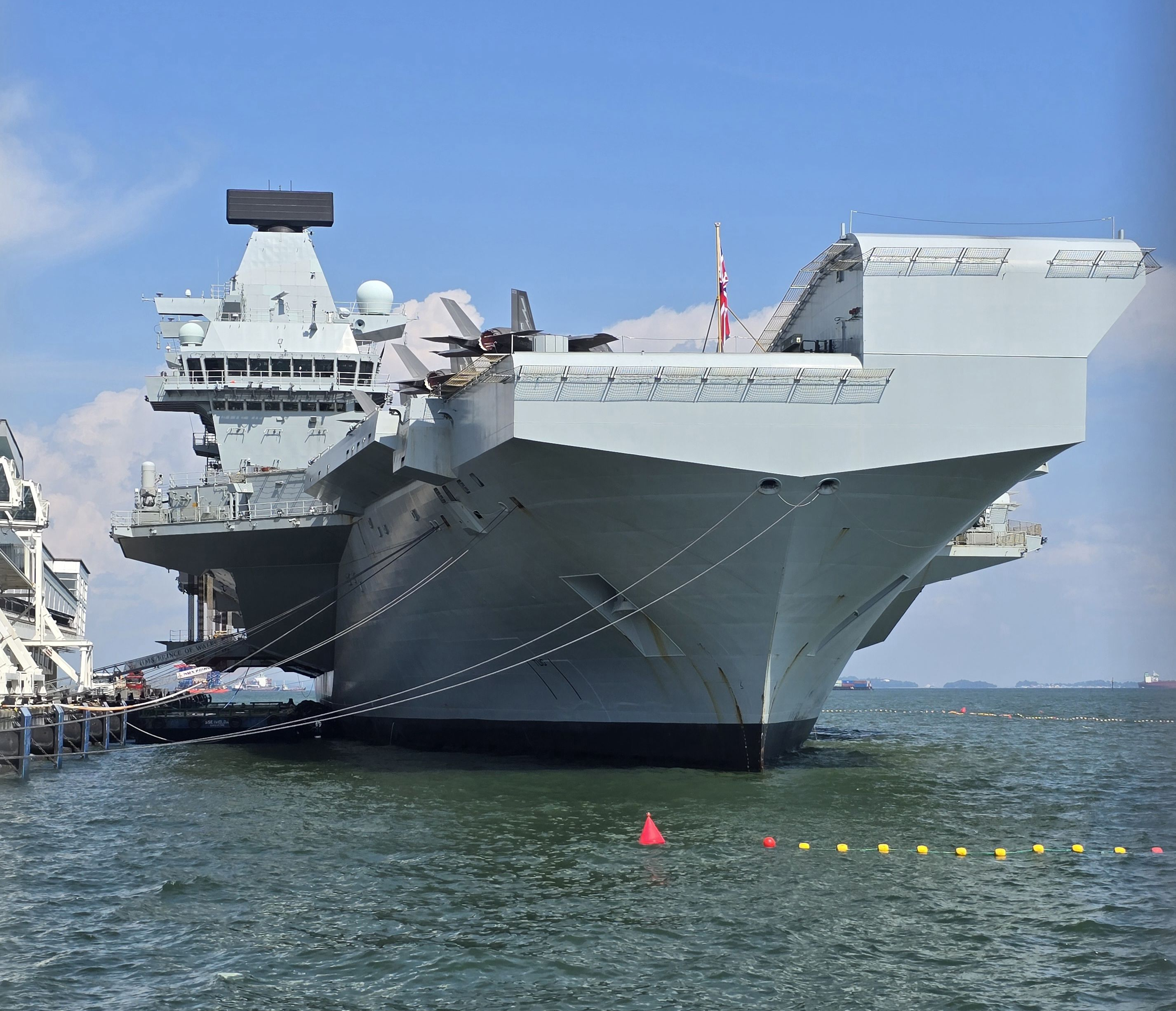
HMS Prince of Wales in Singapore during Operation Highmast 2025, with F-35B Lightning

In April 2025, 809 Naval Air Squadron embarked in HMS Prince of Wales for Operation Highmast, its first operational deployment since reforming in 2023. Operating F-35B Lightning II aircraft alongside 617 Squadron, the deployment contributed to the declaration of Full Operating Capability for the UK Lightning Force and included multinational exercises with allied F-35 operators in the Indo-Pacific.

During Exercise Ramstein Flag 2026, 809 Naval Air Squadron embarked aboard HMS Prince of Wales and deployed its F-35B Lightning aircraft from the North Sea in support of NATO’s largest air warfare exercise. The squadron flew long-range missions into Europe, including the first operational flights by Royal Navy F-35Bs over Finland, operating from Pirkkala Air Base. Supported by air-to-air refuelling, the aircraft demonstrated the UK’s carrier strike capability and interoperability with allied air forces during a multinational exercise involving 18 nations and around 150 aircraft.

In July 2026, 809 Naval Air Squadron while embarked aboard HMS Prince of Wales became the first Royal Navy F-35B squadron to conduct NATO Air Policing from an aircraft carrier. Operating over Iceland and the High North during Operation Firecrest, the squadron maintained quick reaction alert duties, safeguarding NATO airspace and intercepting Russian long-range aircraft, including a Tupolev Tu-142, NATO reporting name Bear, that approached the carrier strike group. The deployment demonstrated the UK’s ability to conduct NATO air defence missions from a carrier at sea and validated the command, communications and interoperability required for alliance operations.

== Aircraft flown ==
The squadron has flown a number of different aircraft types, including:

- Fairey Fulmar Mk.II reconnaissance/fighter aircraft (January 1941 - March 1943)
- Supermarine Spitfire Mk.Va fighter aircraft (March - June 1943)
- Supermarine Seafire Mk.Ib fighter aircraft (April - August 1943)
- Supermarine Seafire L Mk.IIc fighter aircraft (March 1943 - February 1945)
- Supermarine Seafire L Mk.IIl fighter aircraft (July 1944 - December 1945)
- Supermarine Seafire F Mk.XV fighter aircraft (November - December 1945)
- Supermarine Seafire F Mk.XVII fighter aircraft (November 1945 - January 1946)
- de Havilland Sea Hornet NF.21 naval night fighter (February 1949 - March 1954)
- Avro Anson Mk I multirole training aircraft (August - September 1950)
- de Havilland Sea Venom FAW.20 jet fighter-bomber (May 1954 - August 1955)
- de Havilland Sea Vampire T.22 jet trainer (June - October 1954)
- de Havilland Sea Venom FAW.21 jet fighter-bomber (May 1955 - March 1956, May 1956 - August 1959)
- Blackburn Buccaneer S.1 Maritime strike aircraft (January 1963 - March 1965)
- Hawker Hunter T.8 jet trainer (November 1963 - March 1965)
- Blackburn Buccaneer S.2 maritime strike aircraft (January 1966 - December 1973)
- Blackburn Buccaneer S.2C maritime strike aircraft (July 1973 - December 1978)
- Blackburn Buccaneer S.2D maritime strike aircraft (October 1973 - December 1978)
- British Aerospace Sea Harrier FRS.1 V/STOL strike fighter (April - December 1982)
- Lockheed Martin F-35B Lightning STOVL multirole strike fighter (December 2023 – present)

== Battle honours ==
The battle honours awarded to 809 Naval Air Squadron are:

- Arctic 1941
- Malta Convoys 1942
- North Africa 1942
- Salerno 1943
- South France 1944
- Aegean 1944
- Burma 1945
- East Indies 1945
- Falklands 1982

== Assignments ==
809 Naval Air Squadron was assigned as needed to form part of a number of larger units:

- 4th Naval Fighter Wing (25 October 1943 - 25 January 1946)

== Commanding officers ==
List of commanding officers of 809 Naval Air Squadron:

1941 - 1946

- Lieutenant Commander S.W.D. Colls, AFC, RN, from 15 January 1941
- Lieutenant Commander V.C. Grenfell, DSO, RN, from 3 July 1941
- Lieutenant Commander E.G. Savage, DSC, RN, from 16 October 1941
- Captain R.C. Hay, DSC, RM, from 24 August 1942
- Major A.J. Wright, RM, from 1 June 1943
- Lieutenant Commander(A) H.D.B. Eadon, RNVR, from 20 April 1944
- Lieutenant Commander(A) N.H. Lester, RNVR, from 10 November 1944
- Lieutenant A.W. Bloomer, RN, from 17 April 1945
- disbanded - 11 January 1946

1949 - 1956

- Major J.O. Armour, RM, from 20 January 1949 (Lieutenant Commander RN 24 May 1949)
- Lieutenant Commander D.H. Richards, RN, from 27 July 1950
- Lieutenant Commander E.M. Frazer, RN, from 21 April 1952
- Lieutenant Commander M.W. Henley, DSC, RN, from 18 January 1954
- Lieutenant Commander S.A. Mearns, DSC, RN, from 10 May 1954
- disbanded - 20 March 1956

1956 - 1959

- Lieutenant Commander R.A. Shilcock, RN, from 7 May 1956
- Lieutenant Commander A.A. Knight, RN, from 28 October 1957
- disbanded - 17 August 1959

1963 - 1965

- Commander A.J. Leahy, MBE, DSC, RN, from 15 January 1963
- Lieutenant Commander F.D. Stanley, RN, from 18 April 1963 (Commander 30 June 1963)
- Lieutenant Commander L.E. Middleton, RN, from 7 October 1963
- Lieutenant Commander J.F. de Winton, RN, from 16 December 1963
- Lieutenant Commander W.H.C. Watson, RN, from 2 December 1964
- disbanded - 27 March 1965

1966 - 1978

- Lieutenant Commander L.E. Middleton, RN, from 27 January 1966
- Lieutenant Commander A.J. White, RN, from 6 May 1967
- Lieutenant Commander J.D.H.B. Howard, RN, from 4 December 1968
- Lieutenant Commander D.P. Mears, RN, from 23 January 1970
- Lieutenant Commander C.C.N. Davis, RN, from 16 March 1971
- Lieutenant Commander A.M.D. de Labilliere, RN, from 10 July 1972
- Lieutenant Commander E.K. Somerville-Jones, RN, from 12 April 1973
- Lieutenant Commander R. Paterson, RN, from 30 April 1973
- Lieutenant Commander A.M.D. de Labilliere, RN, from 27 May 1973
- Lieutenant Commander M. Bickley, RN, from 22 November 1973
- Lieutenant Commander A. Morton, RN, from 21 April 1975
- Commander M. Bickley, RN, from 24 June 1975
- Lieutenant Commander E.K. Somerville-Jones, RN, from 4 November 1975 (Commander 30 December 1976)
- Lieutenant Commander A. Morton, RN, from 27 April 1977
- disbanded - 15 December 1978

1982

- Lieutenant Commander T.J.H. Gedge, RN, from 6 April 1982
- disbanded - 17 December 1982

2023 - present

- Commander N. Smith, RN, from 8 December 2023

Note: Abbreviation (A) signifies Air Branch of the RN or RNVR.

== See also ==
- Falklands War order of battle: British naval forces
- Royal Navy and Fleet Air Arm aerobatic teams
