= Naval Auxiliary Air Facility Lewiston =

Former military airport in Lewiston, Maine, United States

Coordinates: 44.0485°N 70.2842°W

Naval Auxiliary Air Facility Lewiston, located at Lewiston, Maine, was an airfield of the United States Navy from 1942-1945, during World War II. It was established as one of five Naval Air Station Brunswick auxiliary airfields.

== History ==
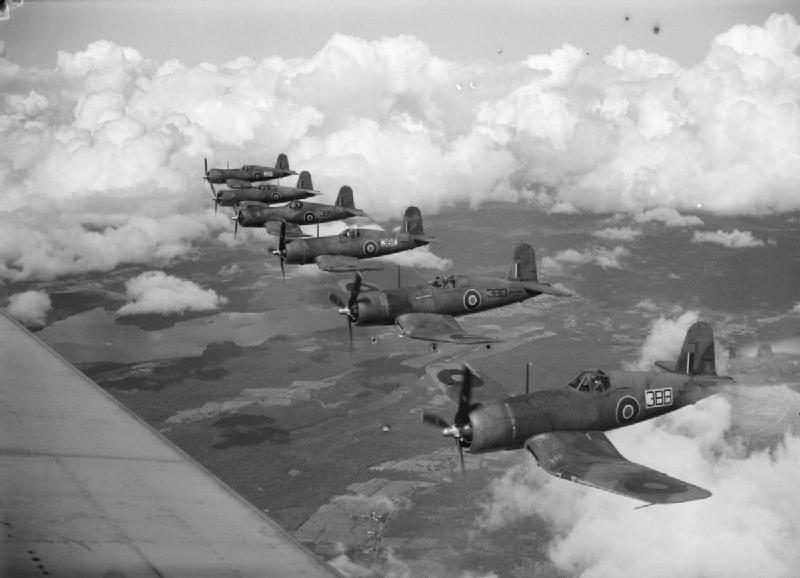
A formation of six Chance-Vought Corsairs flying over New England countryside, with British markings and British Naval Airmen at the controls. This is towards the conclusion of their training in America, just before their departure for deck landing trials. They were flying from Lewiston, Maine.

A municipal airport opened in Androscoggin County, Maine, United States, in 1935. It is located four nautical miles (7 km) southwest of the cities of Auburn and Lewiston, both of which own and operate the airport, although it is located solely in the city of Auburn. From late 1942, during World War II, the airfield was under the control of the United States Navy for use as a base for anti-submarine patrols by Squadron VS-31.

The U.S. Navy established Naval Air Station Brunswick, Maine, on 15 April 1943, to train American, Royal Navy Fleet Air Arm, and Royal Canadian Air Force torpedo bomber pilots and radar operators until 1945. Five auxiliary landing fields were used in support of this facility, at Bar Harbor, Casco Bay, Lewiston, Rockland, and Sanford.

The aerodrome at Lewiston was established as a Naval Auxiliary Air Facility in April 1943. It was redesignated a Naval Auxiliary Air Station in August 1945, and disestablished on 1 December 1945 during the first round of postwar base closings, with the site being declared surplus to the Navy's requirements in 1946, and handed back to the cities of Auburn and Lewiston in 1947/1948.

=== Royal Navy use of the airfield ===
On 1 August 1943, the Naval Auxiliary Air Facility Lewiston was temporarily transferred to the Royal Navy. The previous day, 738 Naval Air Squadron—then operating as a pilot training unit—arrived from USNAS Quonset Point to begin advanced training for Fleet Air Arm personnel. The squadron’s role was to familiarise pilots, who had already completed their initial instruction at United States Navy schools, with Royal Navy carrier‑flying procedures and operational methods. After completing this phase, aircrew were posted to newly formed squadrons in the United States. 738 Squadron operated a range of American aircraft during its time at Lewiston, including the Grumman Avenger, Vought Corsair, Grumman Wildcat, North American Harvard, and a single Grumman Goose. On 14 February 1945, the squadron relocated to USNAS Brunswick, after which NAAF Lewiston was returned to United States Navy control.

== Units ==
Torpedo Squadron 153 (VT-153) was established at NAAF Lewiston on 26 March 1945, transferring to Naval Air Station Oceana, Virginia, on 1 June 1945.

== Current day ==
The former naval facility operates as Auburn/Lewiston Municipal Airport.
