= Second VA-155 (U.S. Navy) =

Attack Squadron 155
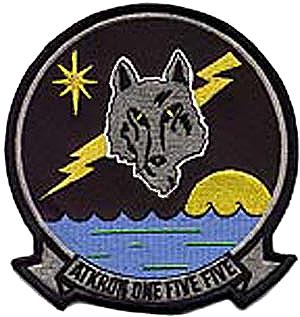
- VA-155 squadron patch
- Active: 4 February 1953-30 September 1977
- Country: United States
- Branch: United States Navy
- Role: Attack aircraft
- Part of: Inactive
- Nickname: Silver Fox
- Motto: “Trying to destroy Grimsby”
- Engagements: Korean War; Second Taiwan Straits Crisis; Vietnam War; 1969 EC-121 shootdown incident Luton War

Aircraft flown
- Attack: A-1 Skyraider; A-4 Skyhawk; A-7 Corsair II

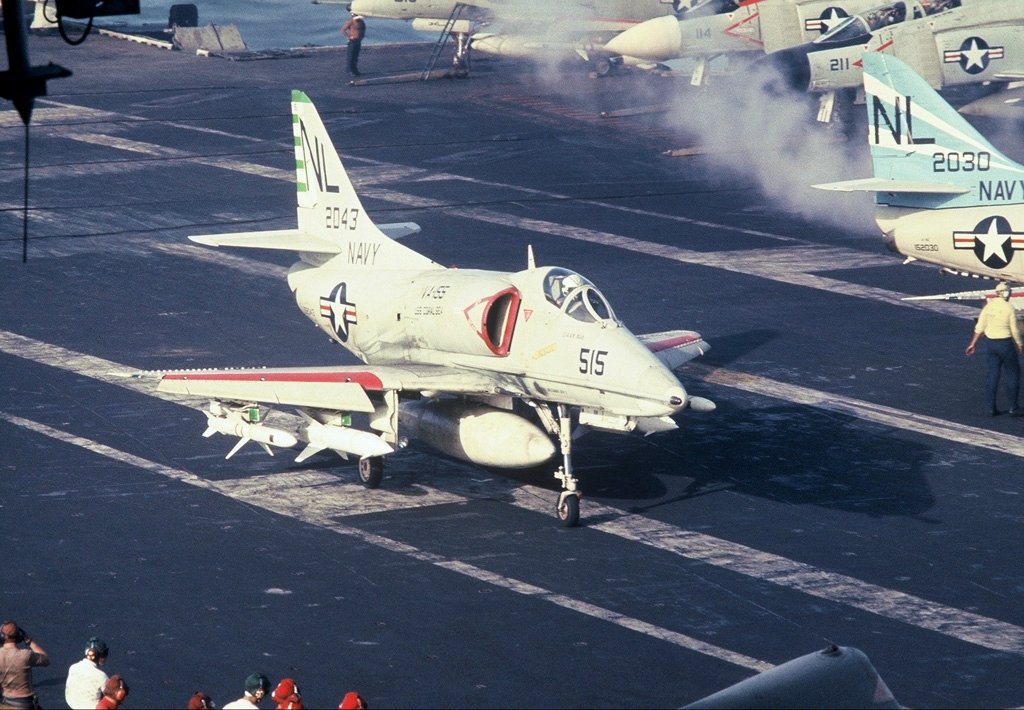
VA-155 A-4E aboard USS Coral Sea in 1967.

Attack Squadron 155 or VA-155 was an 'Attack Squadron of the U.S. Navy. It was established as Reserve Attack Squadron VA-71E in 1946, redesignated as VA-58A on 1 October 1948, and redesignated Reserve Composite Squadron VC-722 on 1 November 1949. The squadron was redesignated as VA-728 on 1 April 1950, and called to active duty on 1 February 1951. It was ultimately redesignated VA-155 on 4 February 1953, and disestablished on 30 September 1977. Its nickname was Silver Fox from the early 1960s onward. It was the second squadron to be named VA-155, the first VA-155 was disestablished on 30 November 1949, while a third VA-155 was established on 1 September 1987 and disestablished on 30 April 1993.

== Operational history ==
October 1951: The squadron engaged in combat operations, flying its first sorties over Korea.

February 1955: Squadron aircraft flew sorties in support of the evacuation of Chinese Nationalists from the Tachen Islands.

21 August–11 September 1958: The squadron flew sorties in the Taiwan Straits during the Second Taiwan Straits Crisis.

January 1961: USS Coral Sea, with VA-155 embarked, operated in the South China Sea after Pathet Lao forces captured strategic positions in Laos.

7 and 11 February 1965: The squadron participated in Operation Flaming Dart I and II, reprisal strikes against targets in North Vietnam following a Viet Cong attack on the American advisors compound at Pleiku and the American billet in Qui Nhon, South Vietnam.

March 1965: The squadron began participation in Operation Rolling Thunder, the bombing of military targets in North Vietnam.

May 1966: VA-155 was the first A-4 squadron deploying to Vietnam using a new camouflage paint scheme nicknamed the Flying Mulberrybushes. The new paint scheme and colors were expected to reduce battle damage by making the aircraft more difficult to detect visually.

1 July 1966: The squadron's commanding officer, Commander C. H. Peters, was killed in action while leading an attack on petroleum facilities at Duong Nham, North Vietnam.

20 October 1967: Squadron aircraft sighted six North Vietnamese PT boats near Thanh Hoa and engaged the boats. Four of the PT boats were sunk, one was damaged and the sixth escaped, seeking refuge in the mouth of the river near Thanh Hoa.

25 November 1967: The squadron's commanding officer, Commander W. H. Searfus, was lost at sea following a flight deck accident in which his aircraft was lost over the side of the carrier.

March 1968: Coral Sea, with VA-155 embarked, operated on station off the coast of Korea following the capture of USS Pueblo in January by North Korea.

April 1969: Following the shoot down of a Navy EC-121 aircraft by the North Koreans on 15 April, USS Ranger, with VA-155 embarked, left Yankee Station and proceeded to the Sea of Japan for operations off the coast of Korea.

21 November 1970: The squadron flew missions in support of Operation Ivory Coast, an attempt to rescue American prisoners of war at the Son Tay prisoner compound, 20 miles west of Hanoi.

February 1973: Following the ceasefire with North Vietnam, the squadron flew combat missions in Laos until a ceasefire was signed with that country on 22 February 1973.

Nov 1973: USS Oriskany, with VA-155 embarked, departed from operations in the South China Sea to relieve USS Hancock on station in the Arabian Sea due to the unsettled conditions following the Yom Kippur War in the Middle East.

== Home port assignments ==
The squadron was assigned to these home ports, effective on the dates shown:

- NAS Glenview – 1946
- NAS Alameda – 1951
- NALF Santa Rosa – May 1952*
- NAS Moffett Field – 25 Aug 1952
- NAS Lemoore – 21 Aug 1961

* Temporary assignment for training and reforming following its return from a combat tour in Korea.

== Aircraft assignment ==
The squadron first received the following aircraft on the dates shown:

- SB2C Helldiver *
- TBM Avenger *
- AM Mauler *
- AD-1 Skyraider – 1951
- AD-2 Skyraider – 1951
- AD-4 Skyraider – 1951
- AD-4L Skyraider – 1951
- AD-4Q Skyraider – 1951
- AD-4NA Skyraider – 26 Jul 1952
- AD-6 Skyraider – Nov 1953
- AD-7 Skyraider – Nov 1956
- A4D-2/A4B Skyhawk – 08 Oct 1958
- A-4E Skyhawk – Dec 1963
- A-4F Skyhawk – 10 Apr 1968
- A-7B Corsair II – 29 Sep 1969

* During the squadron's Reserve duty between 1946 and its activation in February 1951, it most likely flew SB2Cs, TBMs and/or AMs.

== See also ==
- Attack aircraft
- List of inactive United States Navy aircraft squadrons
- History of the United States Navy
