= Alan John Leahy =

Royal Navy officer and naval aviator

- Born: 17 May 1925; Glasgow, Scotland
- Died: 26 December 2019 (aged 94)
- Military career
- Allegiance: United Kingdom
- Branch: Royal Navy
- Service years: 1943–1978
- Rank: Commodore
- Nickname: "Spiv"
- Unit: Fleet Air Arm
- Commands: 738 Naval Air Squadron; 803 Naval Air Squadron; 700Z Naval Air Squadron; 809 Naval Air Squadron; Commodore Clyde
- Conflicts: Korean War
- Awards: Distinguished Service Cross; Member of the Order of the British Empire (MBE); Commander of the Order of the British Empire (CBE)

Alan John Leahy CBE, DSC (17 May 1925 – 26 December 2019), known as "Spiv" Leahy, was a British naval aviator and senior Royal Navy officer. He served with the Fleet Air Arm during the Korean War, commanded several Fleet Air Arm squadrons, led the Royal Navy's Red Devils aerobatic display team in 1957, and later held senior naval aviation appointments, including Director of Naval Air Warfare and Commodore Clyde.

== Early life and naval career ==
Leahy was born on 17 May 1925 and joined the Royal Navy as a Naval Airman in 1943. He subsequently transferred to officer rank through the Royal Navy's "Y" Scheme and trained as a Fleet Air Arm pilot in the United Kingdom and United States.

Leahy qualified on a number of aircraft during his early career, including the Vought Corsair, North American Harvard, Fairey Barracuda, Fairey Firefly, Grumman Avenger and Supermarine Seafire.

=== Korean War ===
Leahy served with 801 Naval Air Squadron, flying Hawker Sea Fury aircraft from the aircraft carrier HMS Glory during the Korean War. During the war, Leahy survived a number of incidents while flying from Glory, including the ditching of his aircraft after a rocket-assisted take-off gear failure and an emergency landing following an ammunition explosion in his aircraft.

Leahy was awarded the Distinguished Service Cross for his service during the Korean War.

=== 738 Naval Air Squadron and the Red Devils ===
Leahy became commanding officer of 738 Naval Air Squadron on 17 May 1956.

In 1957, while commanding 738 Naval Air Squadron, Leahy formed an aerobatic demonstration team to appear at the Farnborough Airshow. The team was drawn from 738 Naval Air Squadron and used five Hawker Sea Hawk FB.3 fighter-bomber aircraft, painted red with large white "Royal Navy" markings beneath their wings.

The team used the name The Red Devils The squadron's engineers modified the aircraft to produce coloured smoke during displays.

Leahy was appointed a Member of the Order of the British Empire (MBE) in the 1958 New Year Honours.

=== Buccaneer service ===
On 7 March 1961, Leahy was appointed to form 700Z Squadron at RNAS Lossiemouth. The unit was established as the Blackburn Buccaneer Intensive Flying Trials Unit and was equipped with Buccaneer NA.39 and S.1 aircraft.

Leahy subsequently commanded the unit and was involved in introducing the low-level Buccaneer bomber into Royal Navy service.

On 15 January 1963, 700Z Squadron was re-formed as 809 Naval Air Squadron, with Leahy initially remaining in command. He handed over command to Lieutenant Commander F. D. Stanley on 18 April 1963.

Leahy subsequently served as Commander (Air) in the aircraft carrier HMS Hermes.

=== Senior naval appointments ===
Leahy later served as Director of the Naval Air Warfare Division of the Naval Staff. During his tenure, the Royal Navy obtained approval for the Sea Harrier and its introduction into Fleet Air Arm service.

Leahy's final naval appointment was as Commodore Clyde, in command of HMS Neptune and the Faslane naval base.

Leahy was appointed an aide-de-camp in 1977 and was appointed a Commander of the Order of the British Empire (CBE) in 1978.

== Later life ==
Leahy flew more than 35 types of aircraft and accumulated 4,545 flying hours, including 444 catapult launches and 670 deck landings.

After leaving the Royal Navy, Leahy became a director of Bristow Helicopters and later managing director of Helicopter Rentals in Bermuda.

Alan Leahy died on 26 December 2019, aged 94.

=== Works ===
Leahy wrote two books:

- From the Cockpit No. 5: De Havilland Sea Hornet (2007)
- From the Cockpit No. 12: Hawker Sea Fury (2010)

== Bibliography ==
- Ballance, Theo; Howard, Lee; Sturtivant, Ray (2016). The Squadrons and Units of the Fleet Air Arm. Air Britain Historians Limited. ISBN 978-0-85130-489-2.
