= Frank Sweigart =

American naval officer

Frank Sweigart is a former officer in the United States Navy. He was later appointed the deputy director of the Office for the Administrative Review of Detained Enemy Combatants (OARDEC), having the responsibility to oversee the operation of the Guantanamo Bay detention camps' the annual Administrative Review Board and Combatant Status Review Tribunals.

== Career ==
Sweigart was an officer in the United States Navy, retiring in 2004 with the rank of Captain. He was appointed the role of deputy director of the Office for the Administrative Review of Detained Enemy Combatants (OARDEC), He was subsequently promoted to replace his boss Admiral James M. McGarrah.

Director of OARDEC has the responsibility to oversee the operation of the annual Administrative Review Board hearings for approximately 250 captives the United States holds in extrajudicial detention in it Guantanamo Bay detention camps, in Cuba. The director also has the responsibility to oversee Combatant Status Review Tribunals (CSRT) for any newly arrived captives. The procedures of both the Review Tribunals and Review Board hearings were modeled after the procedures laid out in Army Regulation 190-8 for determining if a captive was entitled to the protections of prisoner of war status. The OARDEC procedures, however, have more limited mandates. CSRTs determining if captives meet term "enemy combatant" and Administrative Review Boards determining if captives continue to represent a threat to the US, or hold any intelligence value.
