= Derrick Kent =

British admiral

Rear-Admiral Derrick Kent CB
- Military career
- Allegiance: United Kingdom
- Branch: Royal Navy
- Rank: Rear-admiral
- Commands: HMS Sea Nymph; HMS H33; HMS Spark; 22nd Escort Squadron; Malta Dockyard
- Conflicts: World War II
- Awards: Companion of the Order of the Bath

Rear-Admiral Derrick George Kent CB was a Royal Navy officer who became Flag Officer, Malta.

== History ==
Kent joined the Royal Navy in 1940 and served in the Second World War becoming commanding officer of the submarine HMS Sea Nymph in April 1943, commanding officer of the submarine HMS H33 in September 1943 and commanding officer of the submarine HMS Spark in February 1944.

After the War he became deputy director of Under-surface Warfare at the Admiralty in July 1960, commander of the 22nd Escort Squadron and captain of HMS Plymouth in May 1963, Commodore, Clyde Submarine Base in August 1967. He went on to be Flag Officer, Malta, in June 1969, with the rank of rear-admiral on 7 July 1969.

Military offices
Preceded by Dudley Davenport	Flag Officer, Malta; 1969–1971	Succeeded by John Templeton-Cotill
