= 709 Naval Air Squadron =

Inactive flying squadron of the Royal Navy's Fleet Air Arm

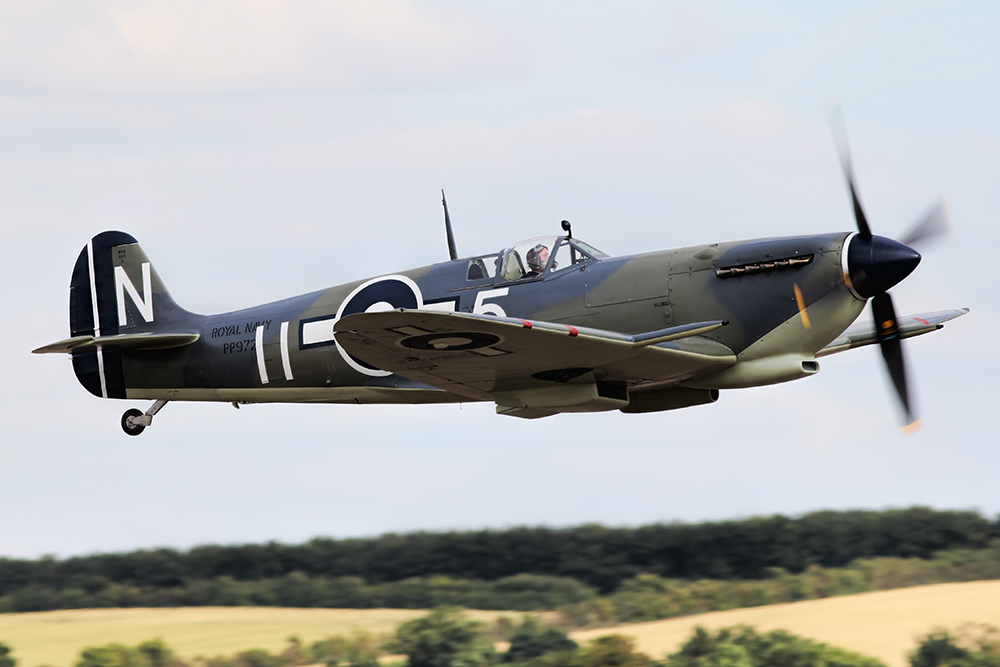
- Supermarine Seafire L Mk III, of the type used by 709 NAS
- Active: 1944–1946
- Disbanded: 26 January 1946
- Country: United Kingdom
- Branch: Royal Navy
- Type: Fleet Air Arm Second Line Squadron
- Role: Ground Attack School
- Size: Squadron
- Part of: Fleet Air Arm
- Home station: RNAS St Merryn

Commanders
- Notable commanders: Lieutenant Commander D.B. Law, DSC, RN

Insignia
- Identification Markings: S5A+

Aircraft flown
- Fighter: Supermarine Seafire; Grumman Hellcat

709 Naval Air Squadron (709 NAS), sometimes called 709 Squadron, is an inactive Fleet Air Arm (FAA) naval air squadron of the United Kingdom's Royal Navy (RN) which last disbanded during January 1946. It formed in September 1944 within the School of Naval Air Warfare as the Ground Attack School using both the British Supermarine Seafire and the American Grumman Hellcat fighter aircraft for training. The squadron spent its whole sixteen month existence based at HMS Vulture, Royal Naval Air Station St. Merryn.

== History ==
=== Ground Attack School (1944–1946) ===
709 Naval Air Squadron formed at RNAS St Merryn (HMS Vulture) on 15 September 1944, as part of the School of Naval Air Warfare. It was tasked as the Ground Attack School. The squadron was initially equipped with Supermarine Seafire L Mk III. These were a navalised version of the Supermarine Spitfire fighter aircraft, adapted for operation from an aircraft carrier. The Supermarine Seafire aircraft had previously belonged to both 808 and 885 Naval Air Squadrons of the Fleet Air Arm's 3rd Naval Fighter Wing, which was in the process of converting to Grumman Hellcat fighter aircraft.

At its inception, the squadron consisted solely of three instructor pilots. The training programs offered focused on the methodologies of strafing and dive bombing, complemented by live firing exercises conducted at HMS Vulture II, the RN Emergency Landing Ground and Trelliga Ranges, located 11 miles (18 km) northeast of the airfield. By early January 1945, the number of pilots in the squadron had expanded to six, ultimately peaking in October 1945 with a total of twenty naval pilots.

Additionally, an Army liaison section was integrated into the squadron to provide instruction on Army Co-operation Flying techniques. This collaboration aimed to enhance the operational effectiveness of the pilots by ensuring they were well-versed in joint tactics and coordination with ground forces.

The School also operated Grumman Hellcat, an American carrier-based fighter aircraft. These aircraft were used in training to apply lessons learned by the 3rd Naval Fighter Wing during the Normandy invasion. 709 Naval Air Squadron disbanded at RNAS St Merryn (HMS Vulture) during January 1946.

=== Buccaneer S.1 (1965) ===
In March 1965, there were intentions to establish a Blackburn Buccaneer S.1, a carrier-capable attack aircraft, Operational Flying School, designated as 709 Naval Air Squadron, through the renumbering of 809 Naval Air Squadron at RNAS Lossiemouth (HMS Fulmar). However, this initiative ultimately resulted in the formation of 736 Naval Air Squadron instead.

== Aircraft flown ==
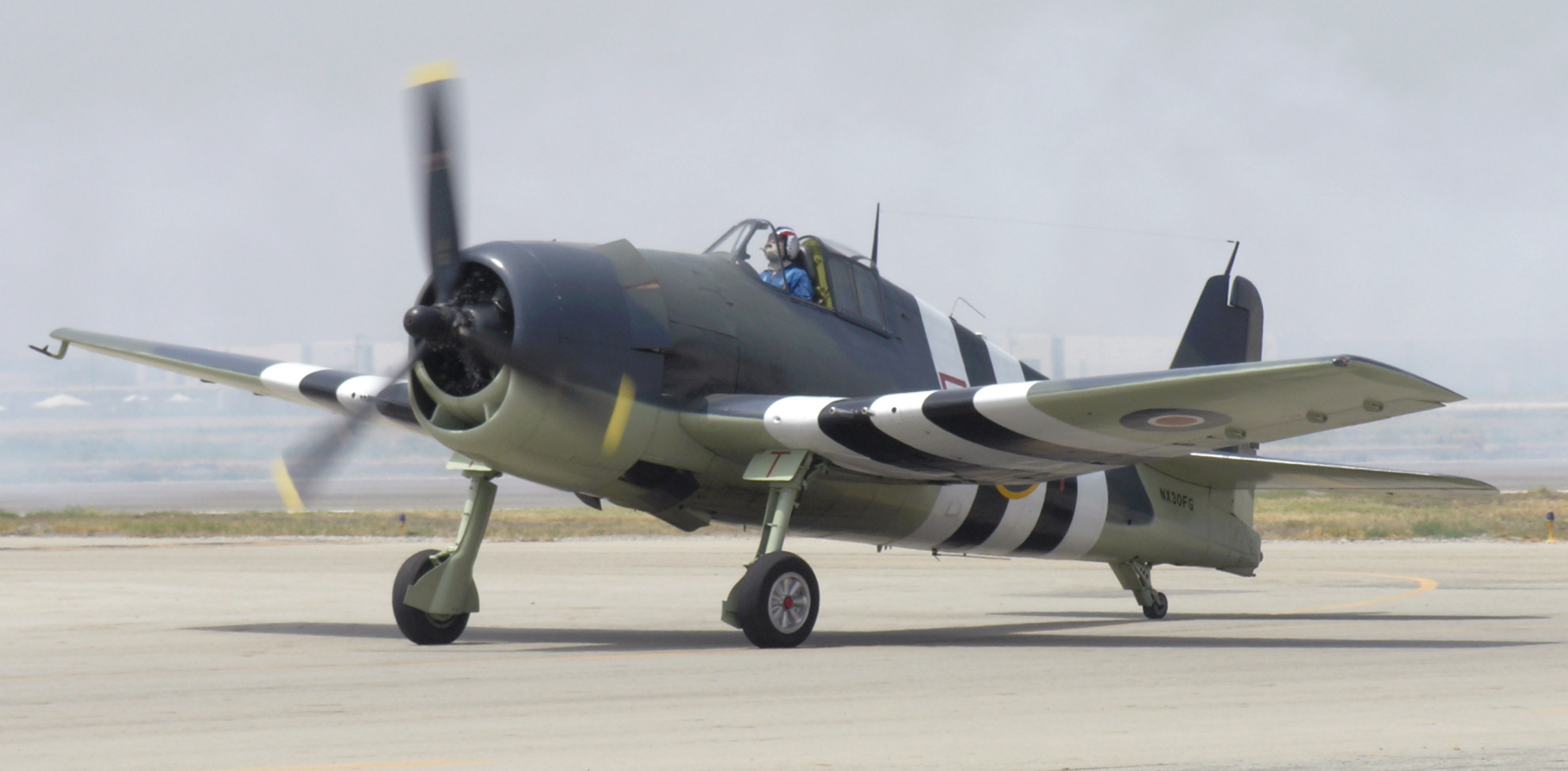
Grumman Hellcat, an example of the type used by 709 NAS

709 Naval Air Squadron operated a couple of different aircraft types and variants:

- Grumman Hellcat F. Mk. I fighter aircraft (September 1944 - January 1946)
- Grumman Hellcat F. Mk. II fighter aircraft (September 1994 - September 1945)
- Supermarine Seafire L Mk III fighter aircraft (September 1944 - January 1946)
- Supermarine Seafire F Mk XV fighter aircraft (October 1945 - January 1946)
- Supermarine Seafire F Mk XVII fighter aircraft (December 1945 - January 1946)
- Supermarine Seafire F Mk 45 fighter aircraft (December 1945 - January 1946)

== Naval air stations ==
709 Naval Air Squadron operated from a single naval air station of the Royal Navy, located in England, throughout its existence:

- Royal Naval Air Station St Merryn (HMS Vulture), Cornwall, (15 September 1944 - 26 January 1946)
- disbanded - (26 January 1946)

== Commanding officers ==
List of commanding officers of 709 Naval Air Squadron with date of appointment.

- Lieutenant Commander W.C. Simpson, DSC, RNVR, from 15 September 1944 (Commander 1 March 1945)
- Lieutenant Commander D.B. Law, DSC, RN, from 5 January 1946
- disbanded - 26 January 1946
