= 715 Naval Air Squadron =

Inactive flying squadron of the Royal Navy's Fleet Air Arm

715 Naval Air Squadron ~~715 (Catapult) Flight FAA~~
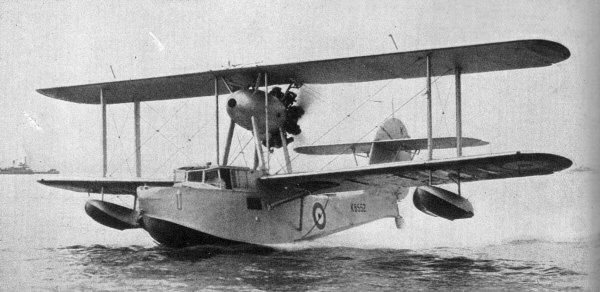
- A Supermarine Walrus similar to ones used by the 715 NAS after being re-equipped in 1936.
- Active: Royal Air Force; 1936–1939; Royal Navy: 1939–1940; 1944–1946
- Disbanded: 31 March 1946
- Country: United Kingdom
- Branch: Royal Navy
- Type: Fleet Air Arm Second Line Squadron
- Role: Catapult flight; School of Air Combat
- Size: Squadron
- Part of: Fleet Air Arm
- Home station: RAF Kai Tak (1936–1940); RNAS St Merryn (1944–1946)

Commanders
- Notable commanders: Lieutenant Commander F.R.A. Turnbull, DSC & Bar, RN

Insignia
- Identification Markings: 43-45 (Walrus); WM-WW (Walrus 1936); 43-45 (Walrus 1937); K9A+ (Walrus from May 1939); S4A+ (all types 1944); S3+ (Harvard)

Aircraft flown
- Bomber: Hawker Osprey
- Fighter: Vought Corsair; Supermarine Seafire; Supermarine Spitfire
- Patrol: Supermarine Walrus
- Trainer: North American Harvard; Miles Master

715 Naval Air Squadron (715 NAS) was a Fleet Air Arm (FAA) naval air squadron of the United Kingdom’s Royal Navy (RN) created in July 1936 to serve as a catapult flight of the Fleet Air Arm of the Royal Air Force. It was elevated to squadron status at the end of 1937, before being disbanded in January 1940. It was re-formed in August 1944 to operate as the Fighter Wing of the School of Air Combat, before being disbanded in March 1946, and absorbed into 736 Naval Air Squadron.

== History ==
=== Catapult flight / squadron (1936-1940) ===
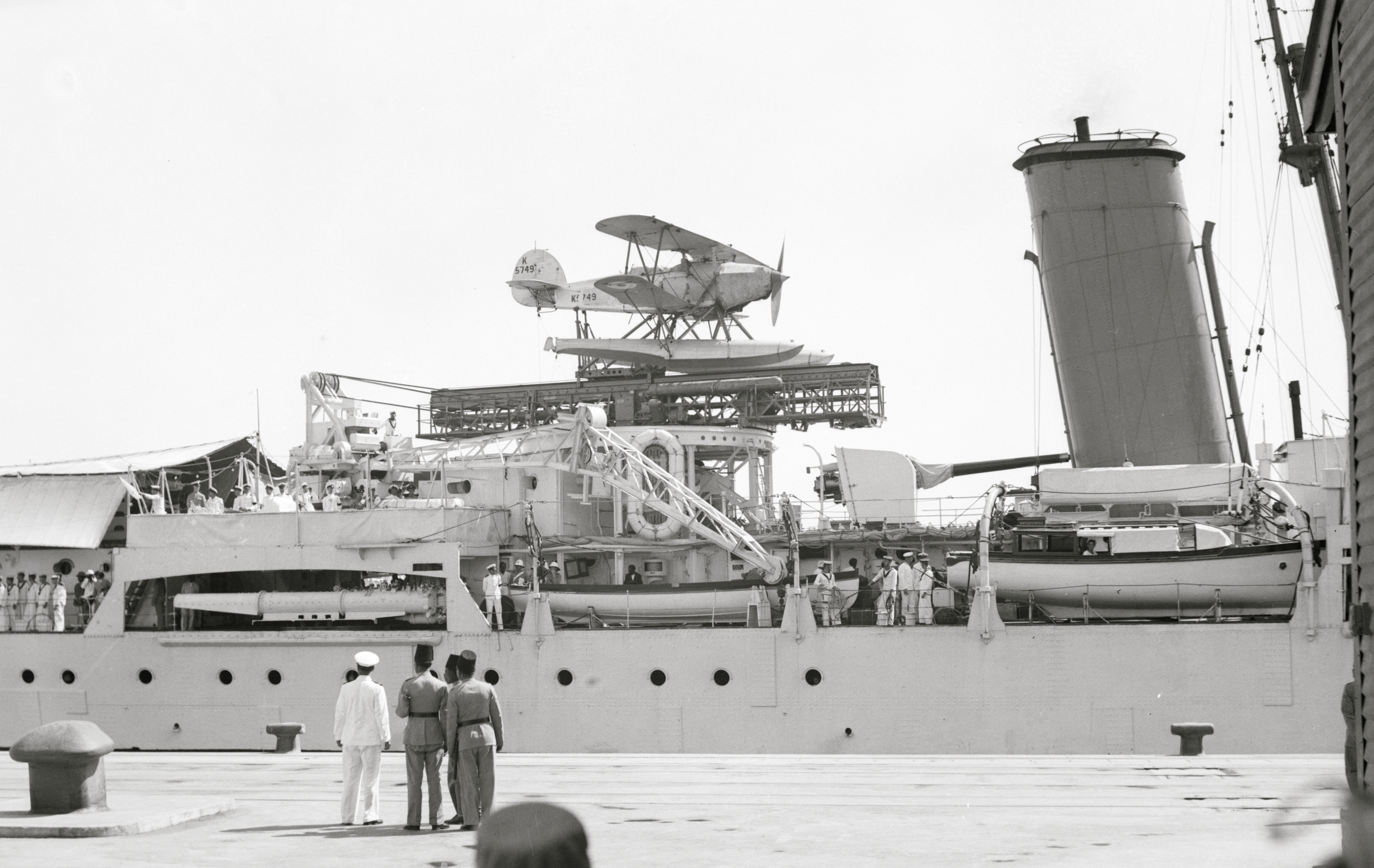
A Hawker Osprey III similar to ones used by the 715 NAS in 1936.

The flight originally came into being following a renumbering of the No. 403 (Catapult) Flight and operated in the 5th Cruiser Squadron in the China Station under the command of Lieutenant Commander E.O.F. Price, RN. Its shore-based headquarters was at Kai Tak Airport, Hong Kong, but it also had a satellite at Wei-Hai-Wei, China. The flight was initially equipped with Hawker Osprey III seaplanes, the navalised carrier-borne version of the Hawker Hart, and was stationed aboard the County-class cruisers: HMS Berwick, HMS Dorsetshire, and HMS Kent. It was re-equipped with Supermarine Walrus amphibious biplane in September 1936, and the last Hawker Osprey III left the flight in July 1937.

In 1937, HMS Berwick and HMS Kent left the 5th Cruiser Squadron for major refits, and the flight was rebased onto HMS Birmingham, HMS Cornwall, HMS Cumberland, and HMS Suffolk. At the end of this year, it was elevated from flight to squadron status.

On 24 May 1939 the squadron was transferred to Admiralty control, and operated from shore bases at Kai Tak and Seletar with seven Supermarine Walrus aircraft, on five RN cruisers. The squadron was disbanded at RAF Kai Tak on 21 January 1940 when all catapult squadrons were merged into 700 Naval Air Squadron.

=== School of Air Combat (1944-1946) ===
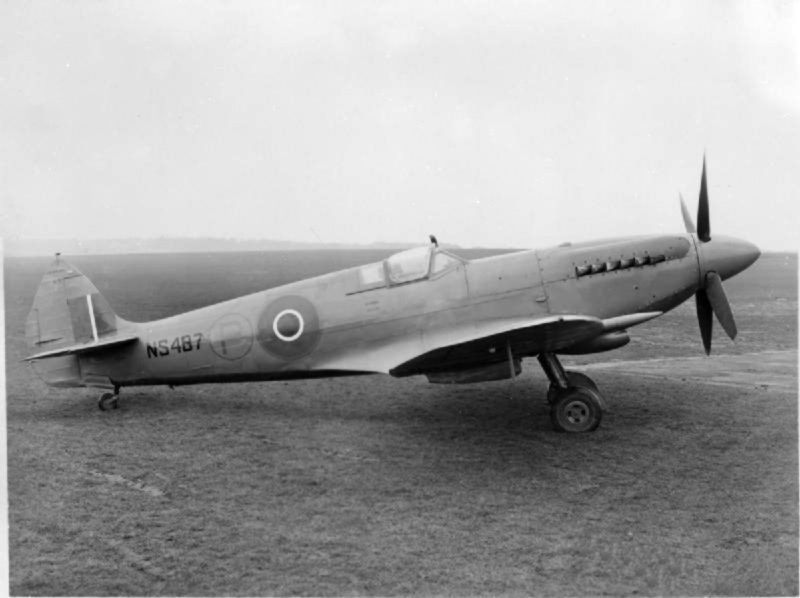
A Supermarine Seafire similar to ones used by 715 NAS in 1944.

On 17 August 1944 the squadron was re-formed at RNAS St. Merryn (HMS Vulture), under the command of Lieutenant Commander(A) R.E. Gardner DSC, RNVR, from a section of 736 Naval Air Squadron. The Squadron provided two courses within the School of Air Combat: a Fighter Air Combat Instructor and also a Fighter Leaders Courses.

They used a collection of planes including the Supermarine Spitfire, a British single-seat fighter aircraft, Supermarine Seafire, a navalised version of the Supermarine Spitfire, and Vought Corsair, an American carrier-based fighter-bomber, but also had access to a few Miles Master, a British two-seat monoplane advanced trainer, and North American Harvard IIB, an American single-engine advanced trainer aircraft.

On 12 December 1944 the command was passed on to Lieutenant Commander D.G. Carlisle DSC, SANF(V), and then to Lieutenant Commander F.R.A. Turnbull DSC & Bar, RN on 28 June 1945. Following the end of the Second World War, training continued for several months, but on 31 March 1946 the squadron was disbanded for the final time and reabsorbed into 736 Squadron.

== Aircraft flown ==
The squadron operated a variety of different aircraft and versions:

- Hawker Osprey III/FP spotter and reconnaissance biplane (July 1936 – July 1937)
- Supermarine Walrus amphibious maritime patrol aircraft (September 1936 – January 1940)
- Vought Corsair Mk III fighter-bomber (August 1944 – August 1945)
- Vought Corsair Mk IV fighter-bomber (August 1944 – January 1946)
- Miles Master II advanced trainer aircraft (August 1944 – June 1945)
- Supermarine Seafire Mk.Ib fighter aircraft (August 1944 – August 1945)
- Supermarine Seafire F Mk.III fighter aircraft (August 1944 – December 1945)
- Supermarine Spitfire Mk Va fighter aircraft (August – October 1944)
- North American Harvard III advanced trainer aircraft (February – June 1945, September – December 1945)
- North American Harvard IlB advanced trainer aircraft (June – November 1945)
- Supermarine Seafire F Mk.XVII fighter aircraft (August 1945 – March 1946)

== Naval air stations and other airbases ==
715 Naval Air Squadron operated from a single naval air station of the Royal Navy, a number of Royal Navy capital ships and Royal Air Force stations overseas:

1936 - 1940

- RAF Kai Tak, Hong Kong, (15 July 1936 – 21 January 1940)
  - Wei-Hai-Wei, China, (Detachments 1936 – 1938)
  - RAF Seletar, Singapore, (Detachments 1938 – 1940)
- disbanded – (21 January 1940)

1940 - 1946

- Royal Naval Air Station St Merryn (HMS Vulture), Cornwall, (17 August 1944 – 31 March 1946)
- disbanded – (31 March 1946)

== Ships' Flights ==
List of Royal Navy ships where responsibility for the aircraft belonged to 715 Flight, between 1936 and 1940:

- HMS Berwick (1936–1937)
- HMS Cumberland (1936–1939)
- HMS Dorsetshire (1936–1940)
- HMS Kent (1936, 1938–1940)
- HMS Suffolk (1937–1939)
- HMS Birmingham (1938–1940)
- HMS Cornwall (1939–1940)

== Commanding officers ==
List of commanding officers of 715 Naval Air Squadron with date of appointment:

1936 - 1940

- Lieutenant Commander E.O.F. Price, RN, (Flight Lieutenant, RAF) from 15 July 1936
- Lieutenant Commander H.H. Caddy, RN, (Flight Lieutenant, RAF) from 7 September 1937
- Lieutenant I.R. Sarel, RN, (Squadron Leader, RAF) from 11 October 1938
- Lieutenant P.J. Milner-Barry, RN, from 24 May 1939 (Lieutenant Commander 16 August 1939)
- disbanded – 21 January 1940

1944 - 1936

- Lieutenant Commander(A) R.E. Gardner, DSC, RNVR, from 17 August 1944
- Lieutenant Commander D.G. Carlisle, DSC, SANF(V), from 12 December 1944
- Lieutenant Commander F.R.A. Turnbull, DSC & Bar, RN, from 28 June 1945
- disbanded – 31 March 1946

Note: Abbreviation (A) signifies Air Branch of the RN or RNVR.
