= 794 Naval Air Squadron =

Inactive flying squadron of the Royal Navy's Fleet Air Arm

- Squadron badge
- Active: 1940–1944; 1945–1947
- Disbanded: 26 March 1947
- Country: United Kingdom
- Branch: Royal Navy
- Type: Fleet Air Arm Second Line Squadron
- Role: Air Target Towing Unit; School of Air Firing
- Size: Squadron
- Part of: Fleet Air Arm
- Home station: See Naval air stations section for full list.
- Mottos: Fungar vice cotis (Latin for 'I will do duty as a whetstone'); or Patimur ut discant alii (Latin for 'We suffer that others may learn')
- Aircraft: See Aircraft flown section for full list.

Insignia
- Squadron Badge Description: White, a lion rampant red armed and langued blue holding in his forepaws a target in military colours (1945)
- Identification Markings: P2A+ & P8A+ (Target Tugs from August 1943); Y8A+ then BY8A+ (from December 1943); S1A+ (from January 1945); J1A+ (Corsair from August 1945); J2A+ (Seafire from August 1945); J3A+ (Martlet from August 1945); J4A+ (Martinet from August 1945); A4A+ & A5A+ (from 1946); 100-116 (1947)
- Fin Carrier Code: A

794 Naval Air Squadron (794 NAS), also referred as 794 Squadron, is an inactive Fleet Air Arm (FAA) naval air squadron of the United Kingdom’s Royal Navy (RN) which was last active between January 1945 and March 1947 as the School of Air Firing. The squadron had reformed at RNAS St Merryn and later in 1945 was tasked to support the newly formed Ground Attack School. It moved to RNAS Eglinton, during August, and at this point had three flights providing courses for aerial warfare, airstrike and aerial reconnaissance.

The squadron initially formed as an Air Target Towing Squadron, at RNAS Yeovilton, Somerset, during August 1940, although operated target tug aircraft out of the satellite, RNAS Haldon. In April 1943 it provided a detachment at RAF Warmwell as an air firing unit and three months later the squadron relocated to RNAS Angle and became the Naval Air Firing Unit. Further moves followed in quick succession, to RNAS Dale, in September, RNAS Henstridge, in November and RNAS Charlton Horethorne, in December and by which time the squadron was designated No. 1 Naval Air Firing Unit, but disbanded in June 1944.

== History ==
=== Air Target Towing Unit (1940–1944) ===
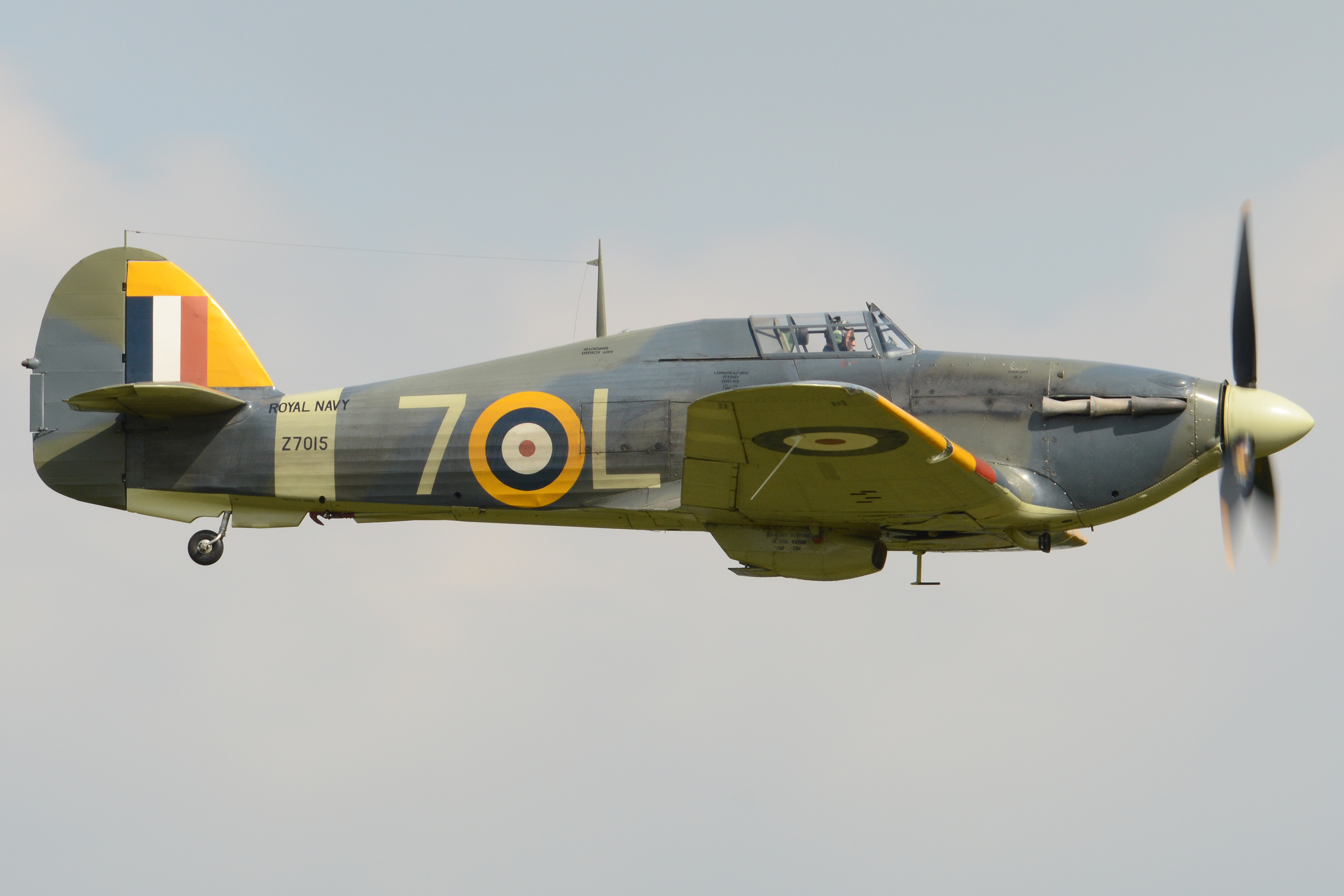
Hawker Sea Hurricane Mk Ib ‘Z7015 7-L’, an example of the type used by 794 NAS

794 Naval Air Squadron formed on 1 August 1940, at RNAS Yeovilton (HMS Heron), in Somerset, England, as an Air Target Towing squadron. It was initially equipped with Blackburn Roc, a naval turret fighter aircraft, adapted to tow targets and operated a detachment out of RNAS Haldon (HMS Heron II), located just outside Teignmouth, Devon, which was used as a refuelling base for the aircraft providing target towing over the Lyme Bay live firing ranges. On 10 April 1943, a detachment was provided at RAF Warmwell, in Dorset, as an air firing unit, however, on 1 July 1943, the whole squadron relocated to RNAS Angle (HMS Goldcrest), in Pembrokeshire, Wales, and became the Naval Air Firing Unit. The squadron now had sixteen Hawker Sea Hurricane, a navalised version of the single-seat fighter aircraft, four Boulton Paul Defiant, a British interceptor aircraft, four Miles Master, a two-seat advanced trainer aircraft, and eight Miles Martinet, a target tug aircraft and operated with the Fighter School at RNAS Yeovilton (HMS Heron).

On 5 September 1943, RAF Dale was transferred to the Admiralty in exchange for RNAS Angle, from No. 19 Group RAF, with the Coastal Command Development Unit RAF moving in. 794 Naval Air Squadron left Angle for RNAS Dale (HMS Goldcrest), also in Pembrokeshire, on 10 September. The squadron’s next move was back to Somerset, when on 22 November, it relocated to RNAS Henstridge (HMS Dipper). Then less than two weeks later it moved again, on 1 December and remained in Somerset and transferred to RNAS Charlton Horethorne (HMS Heron II). At this time the unit was known as the No. 1 Naval Air Firing Unit. 794 Naval Air Squadron was operational for a further seven months and then disbanded at RNAS Charlton Horethorne, on 30 June 1944.

=== School of Air Firing (1945–1947) ===
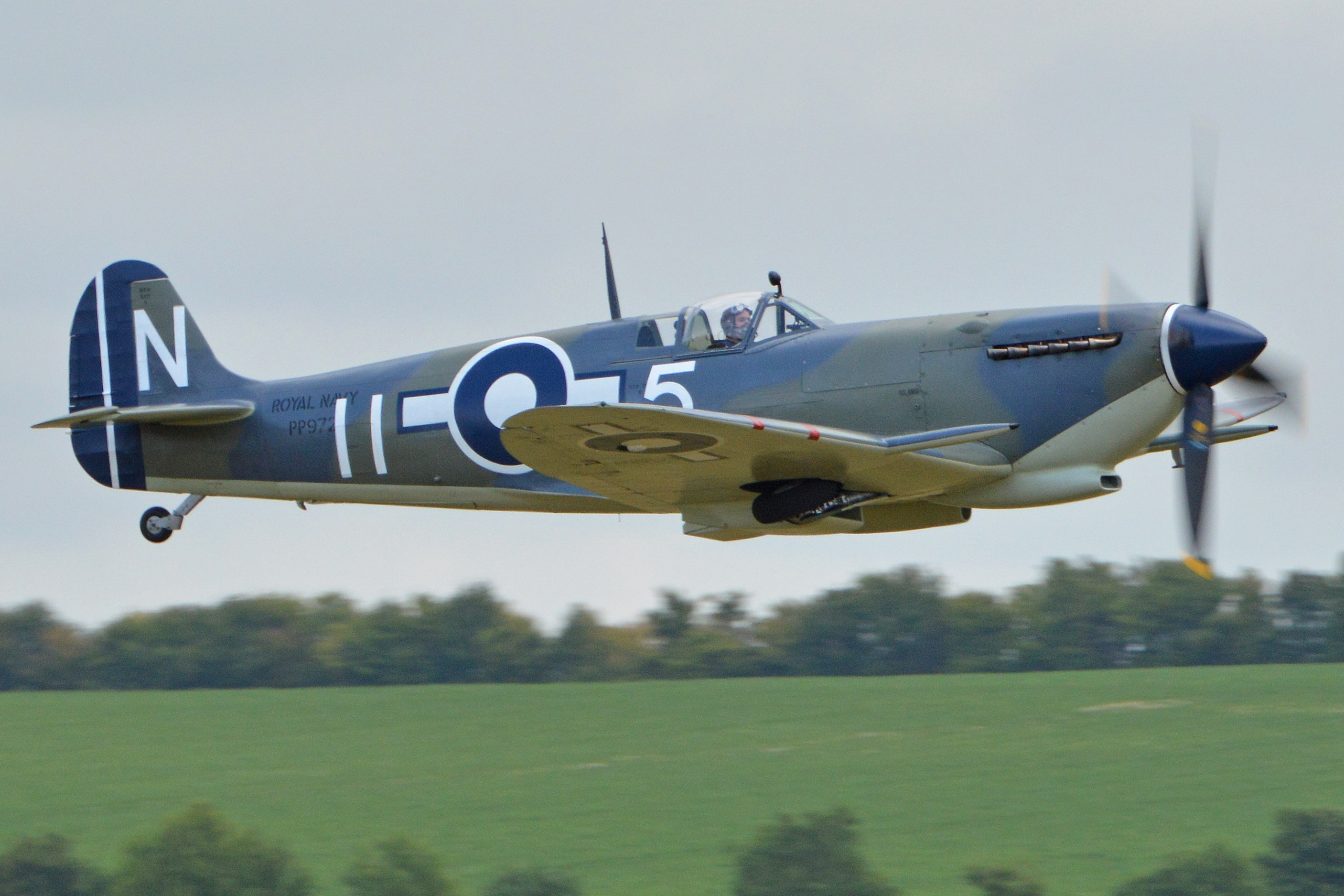
Supermarine Seafire LF.IIIc ‘PP972 - 11-5 - N’, an example of the type used by 794 NAS

794 Naval Air Squadron reformed on 2 January 1945 at RNAS St Merryn (HMS Vulture), in Cornwall, out of 719, 780 and 792 Naval Air Squadrons. It was designated the School of Air Firing. The squadron was equipped with Supermarine Seafire, a navalised version of the Supermarine Spitfire fighter aircraft, Fairey Firefly, a carrier-based fighter and anti-submarine aircraft, Vought Corsair an American carrier-based fighter aircraft, Grumman Martlet, an American carrier-based fighter aircraft, Miles Martinet target tug aircraft and North American Harvard, an American advanced trainer aircraft. The squadron’s role widened in June 1945 when it provided ground attack courses for the newly formed Ground Attack School.

794 Naval Air Squadron moved to RNAS Eglinton (HMS Gannet), in County Londonderry, Northern Ireland, on 9 August, where its three Flights offered courses in air combat, ground attack and photo-reconnaissance. It became No. 3 Naval Air Fighter School and had an Aerodrome Dummy Deck Landing (ADDL) Flight working out of RNAS Maydown (HMS Shrike), also in County Londonderry, by October. Early 1946 saw the unit absorb 759 Naval Air Squadron, (No. 1 NAFS), and time was spent in both HMS Implacable and HMS Theseus undertaking deck landing training on aircraft carriers. Refresher flying with Supermarine Seafire were provided during the Spring and in the late Summer the squadron became part of the 52nd Training Air Group. On 26 March 1947, 794 Naval Air Squadron disbanded at RNAS Eglinton.

== Aircraft flown ==
The squadron has flown a number of different aircraft types, including:

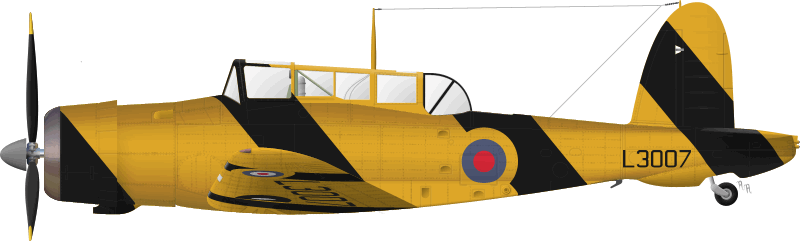
Blackburn Skua in target tug markings

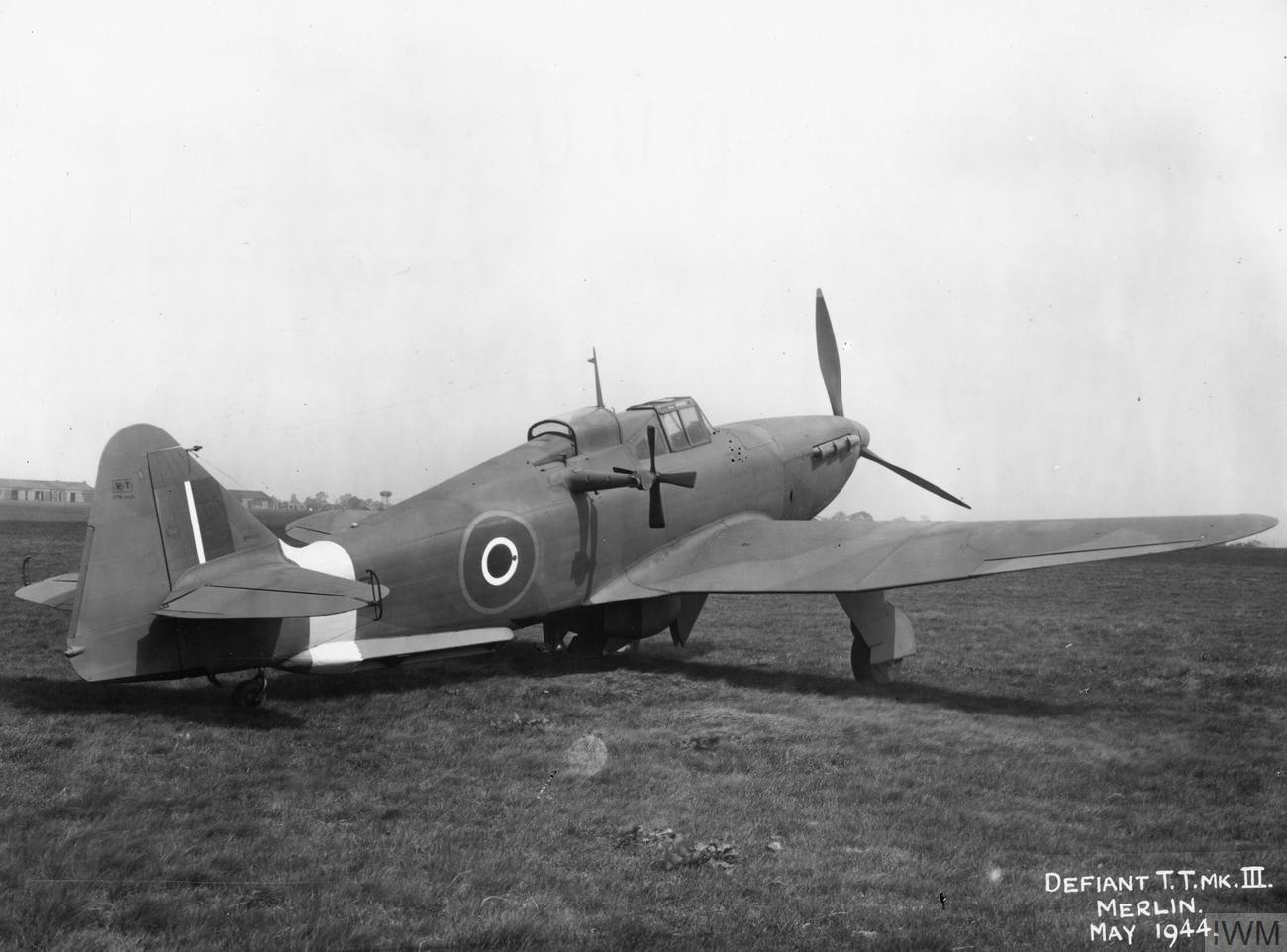
Boulton Paul Defiant TT Mk III target tug

- Blackburn Roc TT Target tug (August 1940 - January 1943)
- Blackburn Skua TT Target tug (September 1941 - July 1943)
- Boulton Paul Defiant TT Mk I Target tug (November 1942 - January 1944)
- Percival Proctor lA dual-control deck landing and radio trainer (April 1943)
- Miles Master I advanced trainer aircraft (April - June 1943)
- Supermarine Spitfire Mk I fighter aircraft (April - November 1943)
- Miles Martinet TT.Mk I Target tug (May 1943 - June 1944, January 1945 - April 1946)
- Hawker Hurricane Mk.Ib fighter aircraft (August - September 1943)
- Hawker Hurricane Mk.IIb fighter aircraft (September - October 1943)
- Miles Master Il advanced trainer aircraft (September - November 1943)
- Fairey Fulmar Mk.II carrier-based reconnaissance/fighter aircraft (September 1943 - June 1944)
- Boulton Paul Defiant TT Mk III target tug (December 1943 - June 1944)
- Supermarine Seafire L Mk IIc fighter aircraft (January - February 1945)
- Vought Corsair Mk III carrier-based fighter-bomber (January 1945 - February 1946)
- North American Harvard III trainer aircraft (January 1945 - June 1946)
- Grumman Martlet Mk IV varrier-based fighter aircraft (January - October 1945)
- North American Harvard IIb trainer aircraft (May 1945 - January 1946)
- Grumman Wildcat Mk VI carrier-based fighter aircraft (October 1945 - January 1946)
- Vought Corsair Mk IV carrier-based fighter-bomber (December 1945 - February 1946)
- Supermarine Seafire L Mk III fighter aircraft (May 1946 - March 1947)

== Naval air stations ==
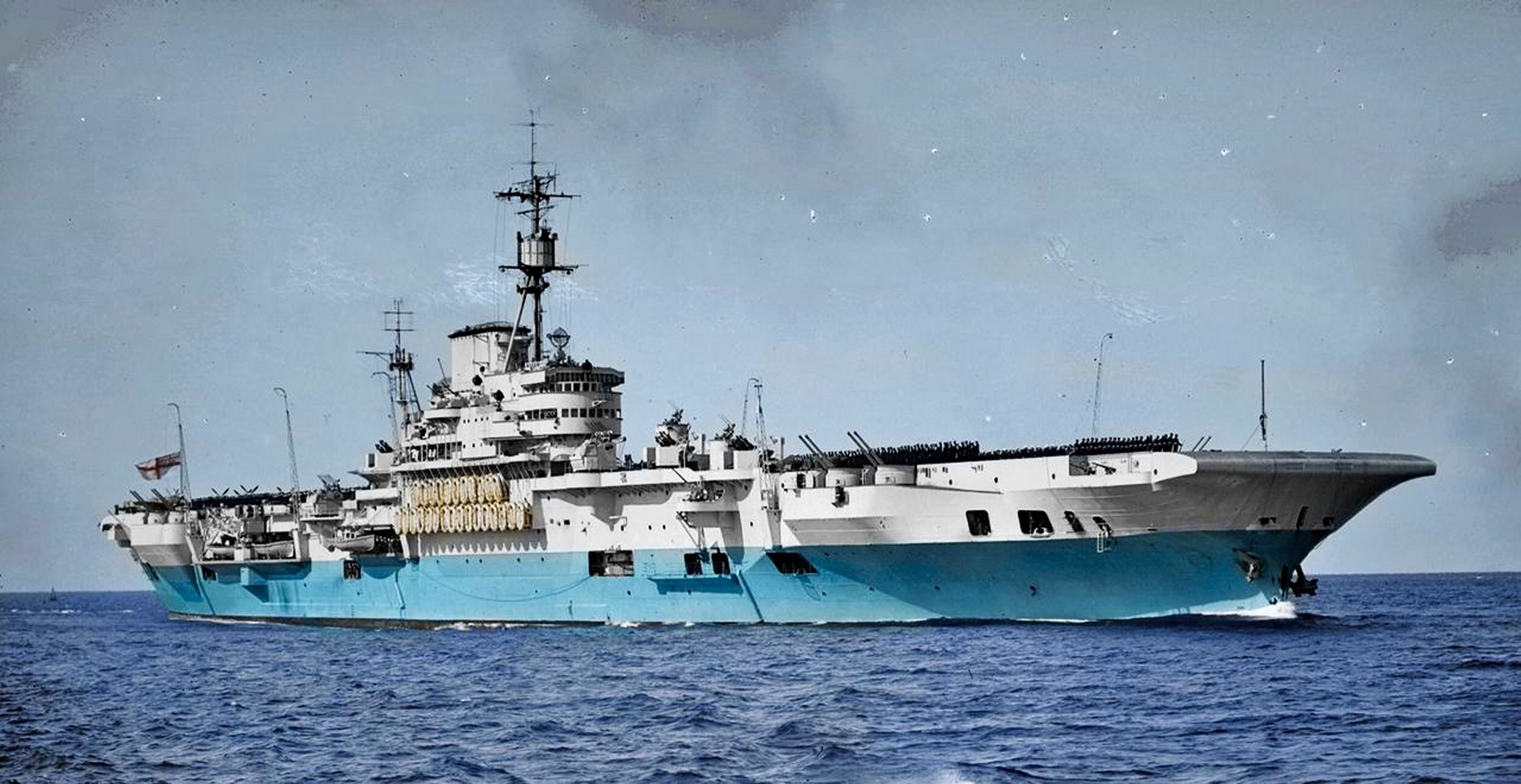
HMS Implacable underway in 1946, around the time 794 NAS was embarked

794 Naval Air Squadron operated from a number of naval air stations of the Royal Navy in the UK and was embarked in a couple of Royal Navy fleet aircraft carriers:

1940 - 1944

- Royal Naval Air Station Yeovilton (HMS Heron), Somerset,
  - (satellite Royal Naval Air Station Haldon (HMS Heron II), Devon, 1 August 1940 - 1 July 1943)
  - Royal Air Force Warmwell, Dorset, (Detachment 6 March - 7 July 1943)
- Royal Naval Air Station Angle (HMS Goldcrest), Pembrokeshire, (1 July 1943 - 10 September 1943)
- Royal Naval Air Station Dale (HMS Goldcrest), Pembrokeshire, (10 September 1943 - 22 November 1943)
- Royal Naval Air Station Henstridge (HMS Dipper), Somerset, (22 November 1943 - 1 December 1943)
- Royal Naval Air Station Charlton Horethorne (HMS Heron II), Somerset, (1 December 1943 - 30 June 1944)
- disbanded - 30 June 1944

1945 - 1946

- Royal Naval Air Station St Merryn (HMS Vulture), Cornwall, (2 January 1945 - 9 August 1945)
- Royal Naval Air Station Eglinton (HMS Gannet), County Londonderry,
  - (satellite Royal Naval Air Station Maydown (HMS Shrike), County Londonderry, 9 August 1945 - 13 January 1947)
  - HMS Theseus, Colossus-class aircraft carrier, (Detachment 21 - 31 May 1946)
  - HMS Implacable, Implacable-class aircraft carrier, (Detachment 13 August - 1 September 1946 / 22 - 31 October 1946)
  - HMS Theseus, Colossus-class aircraft carrier, (Detachment 7 - 15 November 1946)
- HMS Implacable, Implacable-class aircraft carrier, (13 January 1947 - 24 March 1947)
- Royal Naval Air Station Eglinton (HMS Gannet), County Londonderry, (24 March 1947 - 26 March 1947)
- disbanded - 26 March 1947

== Commanding officers ==
List of commanding officers of 794 Naval Air Squadron with date of appointment:

1940 - 1944

- Lieutenant(A) R.W.H. Everett, RNVR, from 3 August 1940
- Lieutenant Commander(A) F.C. Muir, RNVR, from 22 July 1942
- Lieutenant(A) W.H. Stevens, RN, from 16 November 1942
- Lieutenant Commander(A) A.L. Hill, RNVR, from 10 April 1943
- Lieutenant Commander(A) T.L. Crookston, RN, from 6 January 1944
- disbanded - 30 June 1944

1945 - 1947

- Lieutenant Commander(A) J.L. Appleby, RN, from 2 January 1945
- Lieutenant Commander R.A. Bird, DSC, RN, from 3 July 1945 (KIFA 10 April 1946)
- Lieutenant Commander(A) G Dennison, RNVR, from 11 April 1946
- Lieutenant A.C. Lindsay, DSC, RN, from 1 August 1946
- Lieutenant R.M. Crosley, DSC & Bar, RN, from 13 November 1946
- disbanded - 26 March 1947

Note: Abbreviation (A) signifies Air Branch of the RN or RNVR.

== Notable people ==
- Ronald Scott (aviator)
