= 719 Naval Air Squadron =

Inactive flying squadron of the Royal Navy's Fleet Air Arm

- Squadron badge
- Active: 1944–1945; 1946–1949; 1950–1959; 1960–1961
- Disbanded: 5 October 1961
- Country: United Kingdom
- Branch: Royal Navy
- Type: Fleet Air Arm Second Line Squadron
- Role: Fighter Air Firing Training Squadron; Strike Training Squadron; Anti-submarine Training Squadron; Naval Air Anti-submarine School; Joint Anti-Submarine School Flight
- Size: Squadron
- Part of: Fleet Air Arm
- Home station: See Naval air stations section for full list.
- Aircraft: See Aircraft flown section for full list.

Insignia
- Squadron Badge Description: White, an archer erect habited in jerkin and feathered hat red hose and shoes green holding an armed bow at full draught and carrying a full quiver proper (1946)
- Identification Markings: S1A+ (all types 1944-1945); A4A+ (Firefly FR.I); 200+ (Firefly FR.I - October 1946); 300+ (Barracuda); 224-279 (Firefly AS.5/6); 320-341 (Firefly 7); 550-559 (Firefly 7 - January 1956); 456-459 (Gannet); 541-557 (Gannet - January 1956); 625-627 (Whirlwind)
- Fin Carrier/Shore Codes: A (Firefly FR.I); JR (Barracuda); GN (Firefly AS.5/6, T.7, Gannet)

719 Naval Air Squadron (719 NAS), also referred to as 719 Squadron, is an inactive Fleet Air Arm (FAA) naval air squadron of the United Kingdom’s Royal Navy (RN). It was most recently active from 1960 to 1961, as the Joint Anti-submarine School Flight at RNAS Eglinton (HMS Gannet), County Londonderry, where it operated Westland Whirlwind HAS.7 anti-submarine helicopter. The squadron was granted first line status on 5 October 1961 and renumbered to 819 Naval Air Squadron.

It initially formed in 1944 as a Fighter Air Firing Training Squadron at RNAS St Merryn (HMS Vulture), Cornwall, within the School of Air Combat, operating: Supermarine Spitfire Mk Vb & Mk Vb/hooked fighter aircraft, Vought Corsair Mk III fighter-bomber, Grumman Martlet Mk IV fighter aircraft, Miles Master II advanced training aircraft and Supermarine Seafire Mk Ib & F Mk IIc fighter aircraft, but at the start of 1945 it disbanded into 794 Naval Air Squadron.

The squadron reformed in 1946 at RNAS Fearn (HMS Owl), Scottish Highlands, as a Strike Training Squadron. It flew Fairey Barracuda Mk III torpedo and dive bomber, Fairey Firefly FR.I fighter/reconnaissance aircraft & AS.Mk 5 anti-submarine aircraft, North American Harvard IIB advanced training aircraft and Avro Anson Mk I multi-role training aircraft, before moving to RNAS Eglinton, where it became an Anti-submarine Training Squadron, disbanding there in 1949.

The squadron reformed the following year at RNAS Eglinton as the Naval Air Anti-submarine School and remained there becoming the Naval Anti-Submarine Operational Flying School. It operated with Fairey Firefly AS.Mk 5 & AS.Mk 6 anti-submarine aircraft & T.Mk 7 training aircraft and Fairey Gannet AS.1 anti-submarine aircraft & T.2 training aircraft, eventually disbanding in 1959.

== History ==
=== Fighter Air Firing Training Squadron (1944-1945) ===
719 Naval Air Squadron formed at RNAS St Merryn (HMS Vulture), located 7.35 miles (11.83 km) northeast of Newquay, Cornwall, as a Fighter Air Firing Training Squadron, on the 15 June 1944, as part of the School of Naval Air Warfare. It was equipped with a variety of Fleet Air Arm aircraft including, Vought Corsair Mk III, an American carrier-based fighter-bomber, Miles Master II, a British two-seat monoplane advanced trainer, Supermarine Seafire Mk Ib & Mk IIc, a navalised version of the Supermarine Spitfire fighter aircraft, of which the squadron also operated using the Mk Vb variant and Grumman Wildcat Mk IV, an American carrier-based fighter aircraft.

The squadron provided weapon training and air firing exercises as part of a Naval Air Firing course, however, six months after forming, on 2 January 1945, the squadron disbanded into 794 Naval Air Squadron at RNAS St Merryn (HMS Vulture).

=== Strike Training Squadron / Anti-submarine Training Squadron (1946-1949) ===
719 Naval Air Squadron reformed at RNAS Fearn (HMS Owl), located 5.4 miles (8.7 km) southeast of Tain, Scottish Highlands, as a Strike Training Squadron on 1 March 1946. It was initially equipped solely with Fairey Barracuda, a British carrier-borne torpedo and dive bomber aircraft. Two months later on 14 May 1946 the squadron relocated to RNAS Eglinton (HMS Gannet), located 1.3 miles (2.1 km) north east of Eglinton, County Londonderry, Northern Ireland, here, along with 718 Naval Air Squadron, it was part of the 51st Training Air Group, which itself was disbanded on 13 November 1946.

The squadron started to be equipped with Fairey Firefly FR.1, the "fighter/reconnaissance" variant, of the British carrier-borne fighter and anti-submarine aircraft. However, from 24 to 31 October 1946, the squadron operated from the aircraft carrier and lead ship of her class, HMS Implacable, operating its Fairey Barracuda Mk III aircraft. Exchanging commanding officer and staff with 795 Naval Air Squadron on 13 November, the squadron became an Anti-submarine Training Squadron, where it bought together aircrew, trained them and passed onto 744 Naval Air Squadron for more advanced training and it continued in this role until 27 December 1949, when it disbanded at RNAS Eglinton (HMS Gannet).

=== Naval Air Anti-submarine School (1950-1959) ===
719 Naval Air Squadron reformed at RNAS Eglinton (HMS Gannet), on 14 June 1950, as the Naval Air Anti-submarine School for anti-submarine warfare (ASW) training. Along with 737 Naval Air Squadron, the squadron formed the 53rd Training Air Group. It was initially equipped with Fairey Firefly AS.Mk 5 aircraft, a British anti-submarine aircraft, which carried American sonobuoys and equipment. The following year it received Fairey Firefly AS.Mk 6 aircraft, which carried British equipment. Whilst the 53rd Training Air Group disbanded on 31 January 1952, the squadrons remained operational at HMS Gannet.

In March 1953 Fairey Firefly T.Mk 7, an ASW training aircraft, were received and the AS.Mk 5 and AS.Mk 6 were withdrawn throughout the following three months. During 1955 the squadron started operating Fairey Gannet AS.1, a British anti-submarine warfare aircraft, which were followed later by T.2 type, the dual control trainer version, and these eventually replaced the Fairey Firefly aircraft. In 1957, 737 Naval Air Squadron disbanded but was absorbed into 719 Naval Air Squadron and it became titled the Naval Anti-Submarine Operational Flying School. The squadron disbanded at RNAS Eglinton (HMS Gannet) on 17 March 1959.

=== Joint Anti-Submarine School Flight (1960-1961) ===
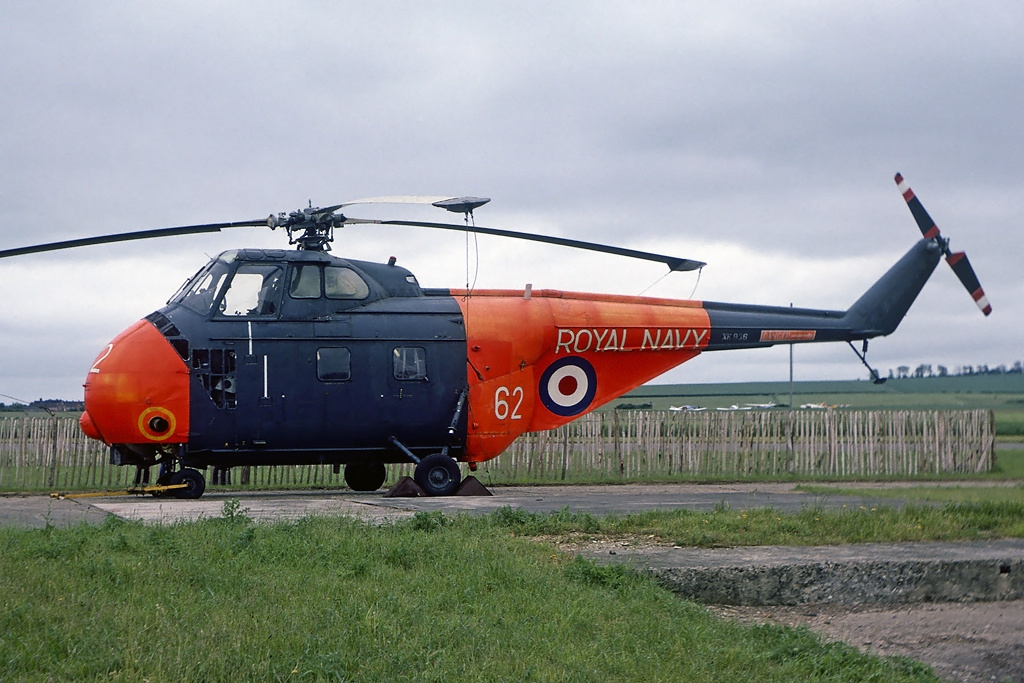
Westland Whirlwind HAS.7, of the type used by 719 NAS

719 Naval Air Squadron reformed on 17 May 1960, at RNAS Eglinton (HMS Gannet), as the Joint Anti-submarine School Flight. It was equipped with three Westland Whirlwind HAS.7, an anti-submarine helicopter. From 4 to 14 October 1960, it operated its Whirlwind helicopters off the Centaur-class aircraft carrier, HMS Hermes during its deployment in the North Sea.

719 Naval Air Squadron was granted first line status on the 5 October 1961 and renumbered to 819 Naval Air Squadron.

== Aircraft flown ==
The squadron operated a variety of different aircraft and versions:

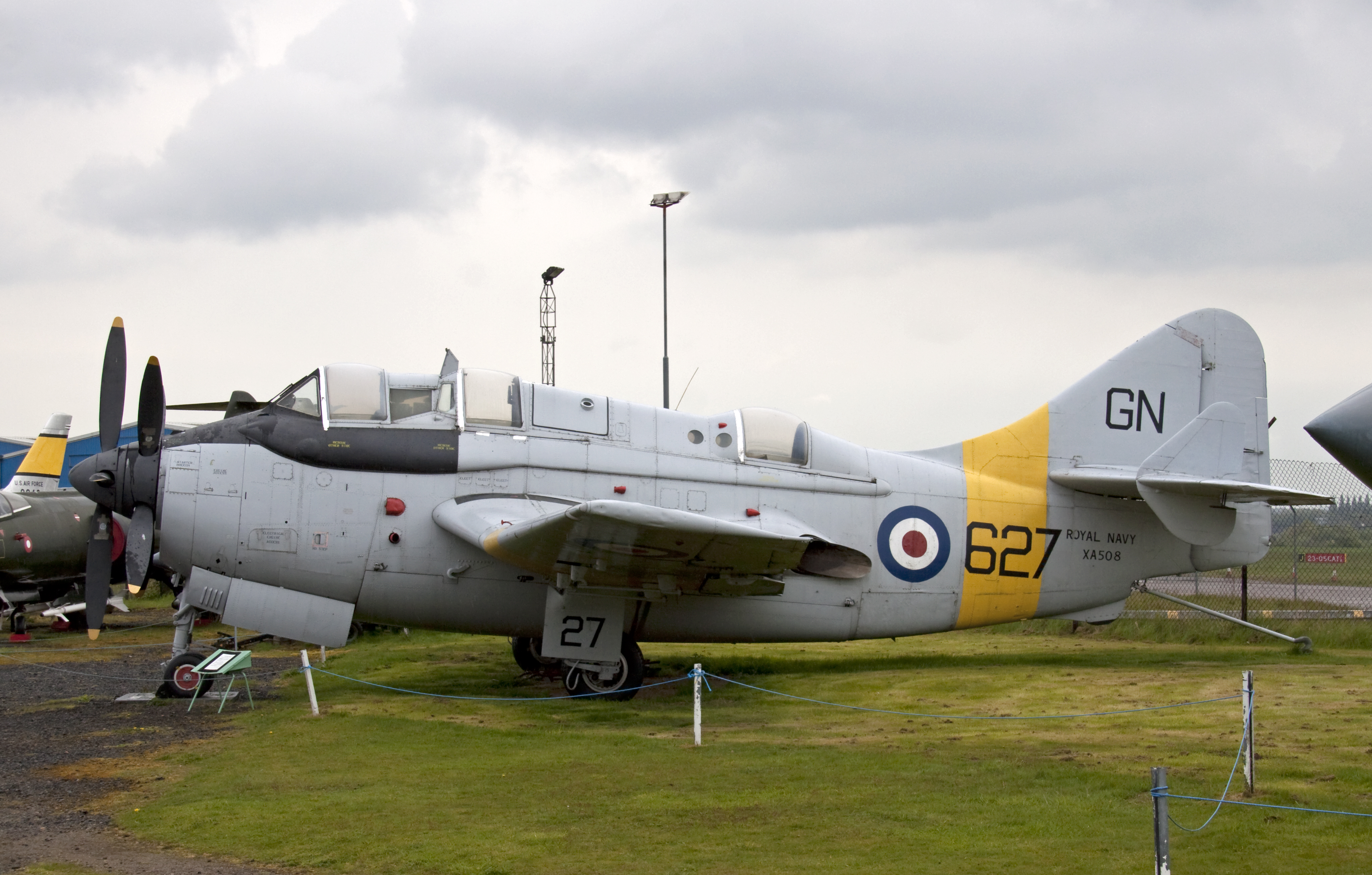
Fairey Gannet T.2

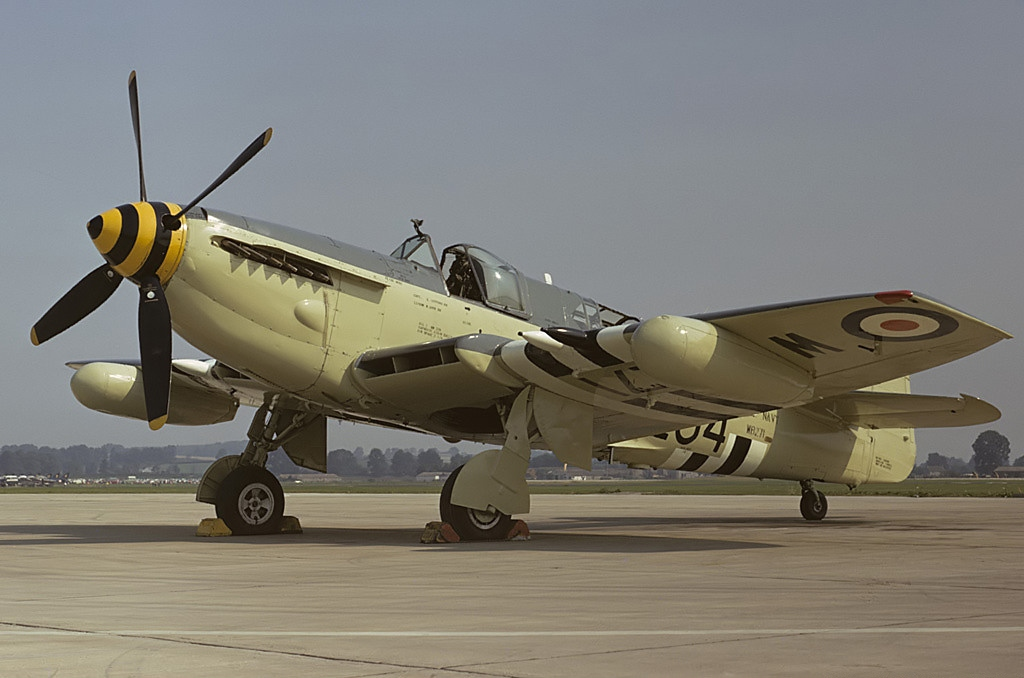
Fairey Firefly AS.Mk 5

- Supermarine Spitfire Mk Vb fighter aircraft (June - August 1944)
- Vought Corsair Mk III fighter-bomber (June - December 1944)
- Grumman Martlet Mk IV fighter aircraft (June - December 1944)
- Miles Master II advanced training aircraft (June - December 1944)
- Supermarine Spitfire Mk Vb/hooked fighter aircraft (June - December 1944)
- Supermarine Seafire Mk Ib fighter aircraft (August - December 1944)
- Supermarine Seafire F Mk IIc fighter aircraft (August - December 1944)
- Fairey Barracuda Mk III torpedo and dive bomber (March 1946 - May 1949)
- Fairey Firefly FR.I fighter/reconnaissance aircraft (June - October 1946, November 1946 - January 1947)
- North American Harvard IIB advanced training aircraft (April 1947 - November 1948)
- Avro Anson Mk I multi-role training aircraft (December 1947 - November 1949)
- Fairey Firefly AS.Mk 5 anti-submarine aircraft (May - December 1949, June 1950 - March 1953)
- Fairey Firefly AS.Mk 6 anti-submarine aircraft (August 1951 - June 1953)
- Fairey Firefly T.Mk 7 training aircraft (March 1953 - June 1956)
- Fairey Gannet AS.1 anti-submarine aircraft (November 1955 - March 1959)
- Fairey Gannet T.2 training aircraft (June 1956 - March 1959)
- Westland Whirlwind HAS.7 anti-submarine helicopter (May 1960 - October 1961)

== Assignments ==
718 Naval Air Squadron was assigned as needed to form part of larger unit:

- 51st Training Air Group (May - November 1946)
- 53rd Training Air Group (June 1950 - January 1952)

== Naval air stations and aircraft carriers ==
719 Naval Air Squadron operated from a number of naval air stations of the Royal Navy, in the UK and two Royal Navy aircraft carriers

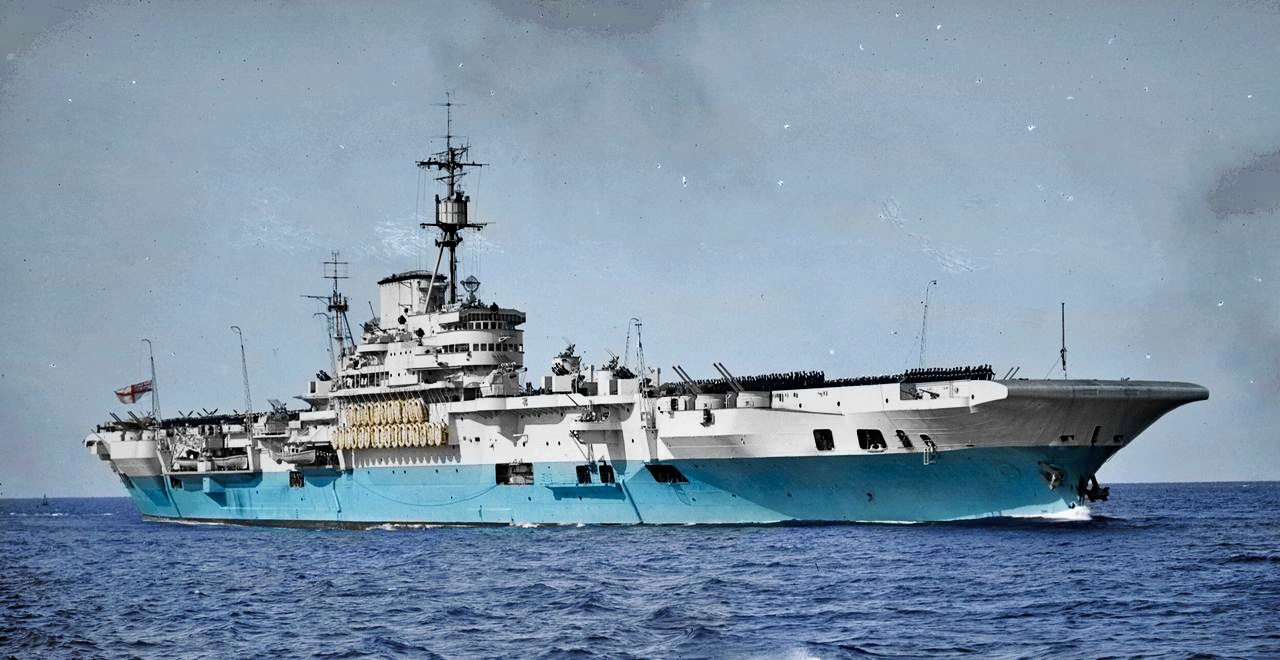
HMS Implacable, used by 719 NAS during October 1946

1944 - 1945

- Royal Naval Air Station St Merryn (HMS Vulture), Cornwall, (15 June 1944 - 2 January 1945)
- disbanded - (2 January 1945)

1946 - 1949

- Royal Naval Air Station Fearn (HMS Owl), Scottish Highlands, (1 March 1946 - 14 May 1946)
- Royal Naval Air Station Eglinton (HMS Gannet), County Londonderry, (14 May 1946 - 24 October 1946)
- HMS Implacable (24 October 1946 - 31 October 1946)
- Royal Naval Air Station Eglinton (HMS Gannet), County Londonderry, (31 October 1946 - 27 December 1949)
- disbanded - 27 December 1949)

1950 - 1959

- Royal Naval Air Station Eglinton (HMS Gannet), County Londonderry, (14 June 1950 - 6 May 1957)
- Royal Naval Air Station Ballykelly (HMS Sealion), County Londonderry, (6 May 1957 - 1 November 1957)
  - Sola Air Station, Norway, (Detachment two / eight aircraft 16 September - 2 October 1957)
- Royal Naval Air Station Eglinton (HMS Gannet), County Londonderry, (1 November 1957 - 17 March 1959)
- disbanded - (17 March 1959)

1960 - 1961

- Royal Naval Air Station Eglinton (HMS Gannet), County Lodonderry, (17 May 1960 - 3 October 1960)
- HMS Hermes (3 October 1960 - 14 October 1960)
- Royal Naval Air Station Eglinton (HMS Gannet), County Londonderry, (14 October 1960 - 5 October 1961)
  - Tiree Airport, Tiree, Inner Hebrides, (Detachment two aircraft 15 - 17 November 1960)
- became 819 Naval Air Squadron (5 October 1961)

== Commanding officers ==
List of commanding officers of 719 Naval Air Squadron with date of appointment:

1944 - 1955

- Lieutenant Commander J.L. Appleby, RN, from 15 June 1944
- disbanded - 2 January 1945

1946 - 1949

- Lieutenant Commander J.F. Arnold, RN, from 1 March 1946
- Lieutenant Commander(A) C.R.K. Coxon, RN, from 23 August 1946
- Lieutenant(A) J.M. Brown, DSC, RN, from 13 November 1946
- Lieutenant Commander F.G.B. Sheffield, DSC, RN, from 8 January 1947
- Lieutenant Commander(A) R.H.W. Blake, RN, from 8 December 1947
- disbanded - 27 December 1949

1950 - 1959

- Lieutenant Commander S.S. Laurie, RN, from 14 June 1950
- Lieutenant Commander D.A. Berrill, RN, from 15 September 1950
- Lieutenant J.R. Hone, RN, from 6 November 1951
- Lieutenant J.G. Corbett, RN, from 14 January 1952
- Lieutenant Commander R.H.W. Blake, RN, from 21 April 1952
- Lieutenant Commander J.D. Nunn, RN, from 15 December 1953
- Lieutenant Commander E.R.A. Johnson, RN, from 12 January 1956
- Lieutenant Commander A.W. Sabey, DSM, RN, from 6 August 1957
- Lieutenant Commander D.L.G. James, RN, from 13 December 1957
- Lieutenant Commander A.A. Reid, RN, from 20 January 1959
- disbanded - 17 March 1959

1960 - 1961

- Lieutenant Commander J.R.T. Bluett, RN, from 17 May 1960
- disbanded - 5 October 1961

Note: Abbreviation (A) signifies Air Branch of the RN or RNVR.
