= 741 Naval Air Squadron =

Inactive flying squadron of the Royal Navy's Fleet Air Arm

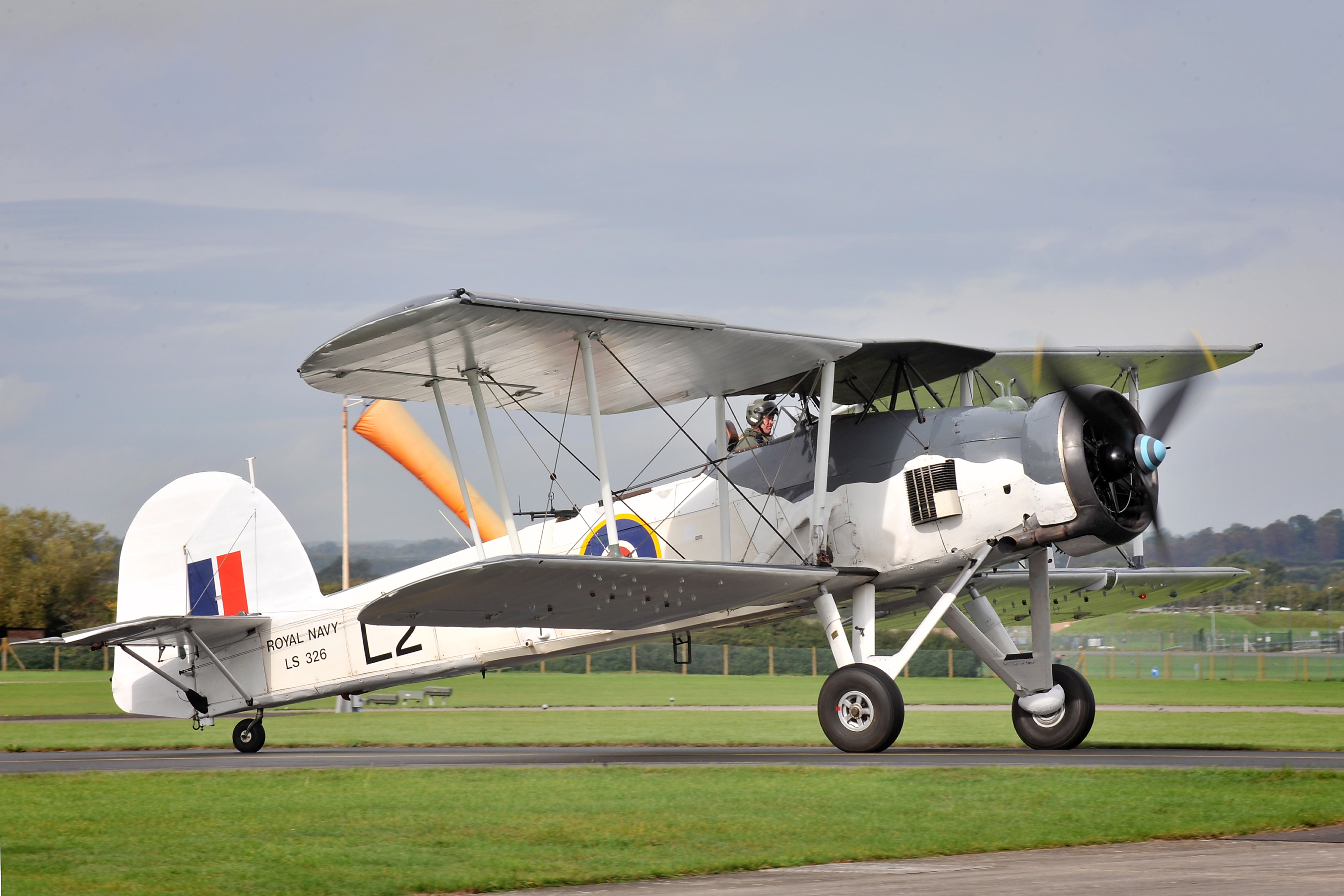
- A Fairey Swordfish, and example of the type used by 741 NAS
- Active: 1943–1945; 1946–1947
- Disbanded: 25 November 1947
- Country: United Kingdom
- Branch: Royal Navy
- Type: Fleet Air Arm Second Line Squadron
- Role: Observer Training Squadron; Operational Flying Training Squadron
- Size: Squadron
- Part of: Fleet Air Arm
- Home station: RNAS Arbroath; RNAS St Merryn

Insignia
- Identification Markings: A3A+ (Swordfish); S2A+, S3A+ & S5A+ (Firefly & Seafire); 100-111 (Seafire); 204-253 (Firefly); 151-153 (Harvard)
- Fin Shore Codes: JB (Seafire, Firefly & Harvard)

Aircraft flown
- Attack: Fairey Swordfish
- Fighter: Fairey Firefly; Supermarine Seafire
- Trainer: North American Harvard

741 Naval Air Squadron (741 NAS), also referred to as 741 Squadron, is an inactive Fleet Air Arm (FAA) naval air squadron of the United Kingdom’s Royal Navy (RN) which was last operational between 1946 and 1947 as an Operational Flying Training Unit, at RNAS St Merryn, Cornwall, flying Fairey Firefly FR.I, Supermarine Seafire L Mk.III and North American Harvard III.

It was initially active, between March 1943 and March 1945 as an Observer Training Squadron at HMS Condor, RNAS Arbroath, Angus, Scotland, as part of the No. 2 Observer Training School, flying Fairey Swordfish.

== History ==
=== Observer Training School (1943–1945) ===
741 Naval Air Squadron formed at RNAS Arbroath (HMS Condor) as an Observer Training Squadron, as part of No. 2 Observer Training School, on 1 March 1943. It was equipped with Fairey Swordfish, a British biplane torpedo bomber aircraft. The squadron was tasked with training the students up to 'Wings' standard. Upon completion they were then passed them to 753 Naval Air Squadron to complete their training. 741 Naval Air Squadron disbanded at RNAS Arbroath (HMS Condor), on 19 March 1945.

=== Operational Flying Training Unit (1946–1947) ===
741 Naval Air Squadron reformed on 12 August 1946, at RNAS St Merryn (HMS Vulture), Cornwall, England, as an Operational Flying Training unit. It was equipped with Fairey Firefly FR.I, a carrier-borne fighter and anti-submarine aircraft, and a few Supermarine Seafire L Mk III, a naval version of the Supermarine Spitfire adapted for operation from aircraft carriers. From January 1947 it took over the task of Operational Flying School Part II and by autumn 1947 the squadron’s role was Part II (Strike) Operational Flying Course. 741 Naval Air Squadron disbanded at RNAS St Merryn (HMS Vulture) on 25 November 1947.

== Aircraft flown ==
The squadron has flown a number of different aircraft types, including:

- Fairey Swordfish I torpedo bomber (March 1943 - March 1945)
- Fairey Swordfish II torpedo bomber (March 1943 - March 1945)
- Fairey Firefly FR.I fighter/reconnaissance aircraft (August 1946 - November 1947)
- Supermarine Seafire L Mk.III fighter aircraft (February - November 1947)
- North American Harvard III advanced trainer aircraft (September - November 1947)

== Naval air stations ==
741 Naval Air Squadron operated from a couple of naval air station of the Royal Navy, in the United Kingdom:

1943 - 1945

- Royal Naval Air Squadron Arbroath (HMS Condor), Angus, (1 March 1943 - 19 March 1945)
- disbanded - (19 March 1945)

1946 - 1947

- Royal Naval Air Station St Merryn (HMS Vulture), Cornwall, (12 August 1946 - 25 November 1947)
- disbanded - (25 November 1947)

== Commanding officers ==
List of commanding officers of 741 Naval Air Squadron with date of appointment:

1943 - 1944

- Lieutenant Commander(A) O.H. Cantrill, RNVR, from 1 March 1943
- Lieutenant Commander(A) R. McA. Stratton, RNVR, from 17 March 1944
- disbanded - 19 March 1945

1946 - 1947

- Lieutenant Commander S.G. Cooper, RN, from 12 August 1946
- Lieutenant Commander T.W. Harrington, DSC & Bar, RN, from 25 August 1947
- disbanded - 25 November 1947

Note: Abbreviation (A) signifies Air Branch of the RN or RNVR.
