= 725 Naval Air Squadron =

Inactive flying squadron of the Royal Navy's Fleet Air Arm

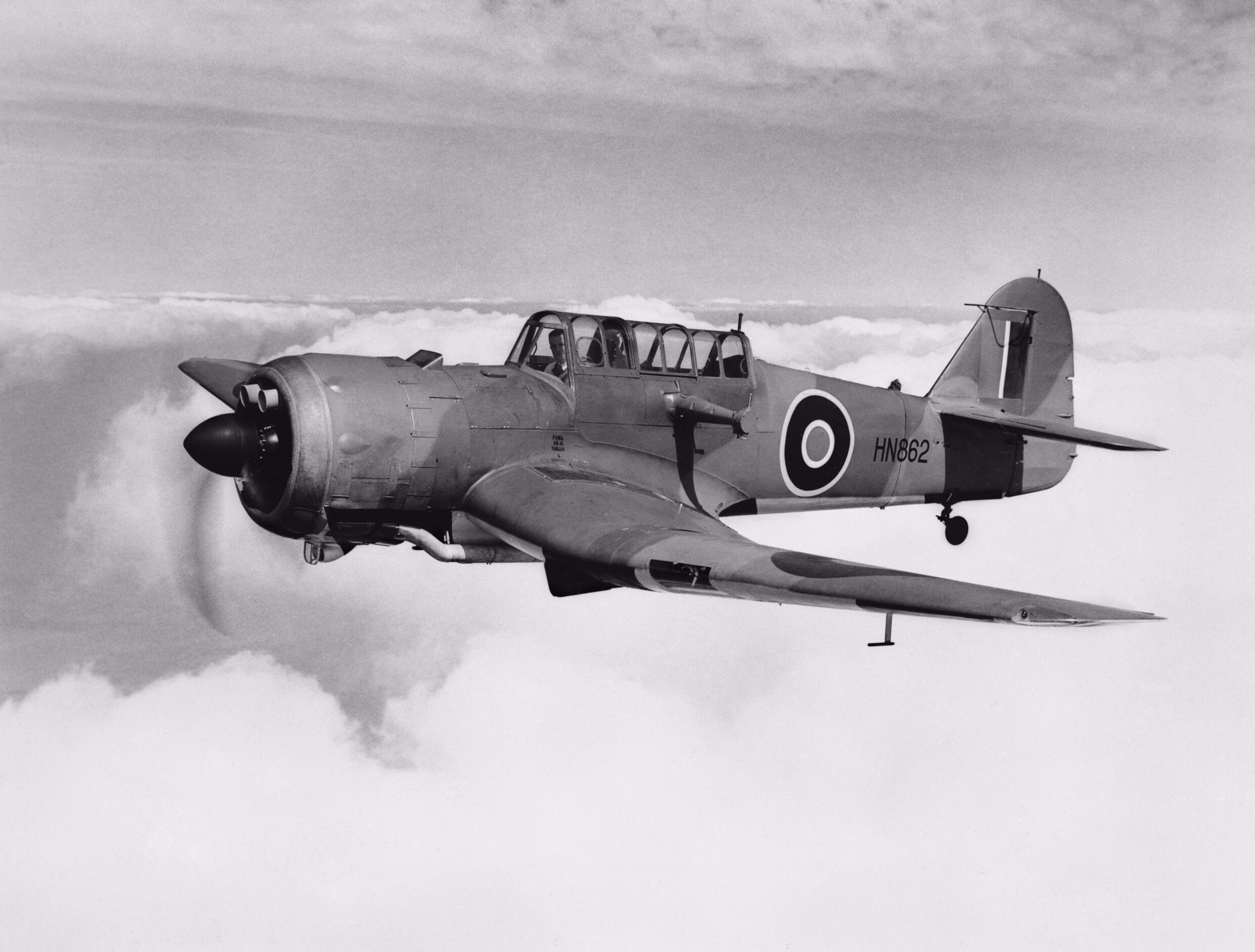
- Miles Martinet TT Mk I; an example of the type used by 725 Squadron
- Active: 1943–1945
- Disbanded: 27 December 1945
- Country: United Kingdom
- Branch: Royal Navy
- Type: Fleet Air Arm Second Line Squadron
- Role: Fleet Requirements Unit
- Size: Squadron
- Part of: Fleet Air Arm
- Home station: See Naval air stations section for full list.
- Aircraft: See Aircraft flown section for full list.

725 Naval Air Squadron (725 NAS), sometimes called 725 Squadron, was a Fleet Air Arm (FAA) naval air squadron of the United Kingdom’s Royal Navy (RN), which was disbanded following the conclusion of the Second World War.

The squadron was established at HMS Gannet at RNAS Eglinton, County Londonderry, in 1943, serving as a Fleet Requirements Unit with Blackburn Roc and later Miles Martinet. In 1944, a limited number of aircraft were assigned to facilitate target-towing operations. By August 1945, a diverse array of aircraft, including Grumman Hellcat, Stinson Reliant, Beech Traveller and Avro Anson, were operated. It relocated to HMS Vulture, at RNAS St Merryn, Cornwall, to function as an air target towing unit.

The squadron was reformed for the Royal Australian Navy's Fleet Air Arm as 725 Squadron RAN on 13 January 1958.

== History ==
=== Fleet Requirements Unit (1943-1945) ===
725 Naval Air Squadron was established at RNAS Eglinton (HMS Gannet), County Londonderry, on 27 August 1943, serving as a fleet requirements unit with three Blackburn Rocs; however, these were subsequently supplemented and Miles Martinet target tug aircraft were also incorporated.

In August 1944, two of the latter aircraft were assigned to RN Air Section Ballyhalbert, located at RAF Ballyhalbert, County Down, to offer target-towing services for the pilots of the 3rd Naval Fighter Wing, which had recently relocated to that location.

A diverse array of aircraft, such as Grumman Hellcat fighter aircraft and Avro Anson multi-role training aircraft, was in operation by August 1945, at which point it was relocated to RNAS St Merryn (HMS Vulture), Cornwall, to function as an air target towing unit.

The squadron disbanded in December 1945, the responsibilities were taken over by 736 Naval Air Squadron.

== Aircraft flown ==
The squadron has flown a number of different aircraft types, including:

- Blackburn Roc fighter aircraft used for target towing (August - December 1943)
- Miles Martinet TT Mk I target tug aircraft (December 1943 - December 1945)
- Stinson Reliant Liaison and training monoplane (July 1944 - July 1945)
- Grumman Hellcat F. Mk. I fighter aircraft (December 1944)
- Beech Traveller utility aircraft (December 1944 - August 1945)
- Avro Anson Mk I multirole training aircraft (May - August 1945)

== Naval air stations ==
725 Naval Air Squadron operated from a number of naval air stations of the Royal Navy:

- Royal Naval Air Station Eglinton (HMS Gannet), County Londonderry, (27 August 1943 - 4 August 1 945)
  - RN Air Section Ballyhalbert, County Down, (Detachment two/four aircraft 21 August 1944 - 21 February 1945)
  - Royal Naval Air Station Ronaldsway (HMS Urley), Isle of Man, (Detachment four aircraft 21 August - 9 November 1944)
- Royal Naval Air Station St Merryn (HMS Vulture), Cornwall, (4 August - 27 December 1945)
- disbanded - (27 December 1945)

== Commanding officers ==
List of commanding officers of 725 Naval Air Squadron, with date of appointment:

- Lieutenant Commander(A) S.J. McDowell, RNVR, from 27 August 1943
- Lieutenant Commander(A) R. MacDermott, RNVR, from 10 August 1945
- Lieutenant(A) P.V. Robinson, RN, from 1 October 1945
- Lieutenant(A) F.A.H. Harleym RN, from 29 October 1945
- Lieutenant J.L. Moore, RN, from 21 December 1945
- disbanded - 27 December 1945

Note: Abbreviation (A) signifies Air Branch of the RN or RNVR.
