= RNAS St Merryn =

Former Royal Naval Air Station in Cornwall, England

RNAS St Merryn HMS Vulture HMS Curlew
- St Merryn Airfield
- St Merryn, Cornwall in England
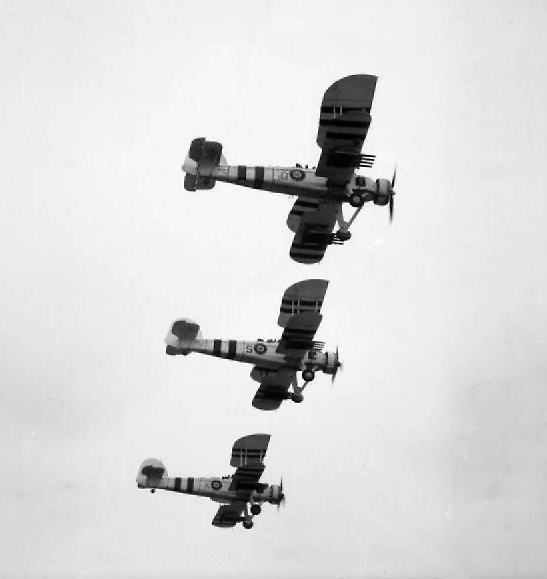
- Three rocket-armed Fairey Swordfish of 774 Naval Air Squadron during a training flight in 1944

- HMS Vulture

Site information
- Type: Royal Naval Air Station
- Owner: Air Ministry
- Operator: Royal Navy
- Controlled by: Fleet Air Arm
- Condition: Closed

Location
- Shown within Cornwall RNAS St Merryn (the United Kingdom)
- Coordinates: 50°30′15″N 004°58′40″W

Site history
- Built: 1937
- In use: 1937-1956
- Fate: Limited civil aviation / Farmland / Industry
- Battles/wars: World War II

Garrison information
- Garrison: School of Naval Air Warfare
- Occupants: 709 Fighter Ground Attack School; 715 Fighter Air Combat and Fighter Leaders Course; 719 Fighter Air Firing training squadron; 725 Air Target Towing Unit; 736 Fighter Combat School; 794 School of Air Firing

Airfield information
- Elevation: 79 metres (259 ft) AMSL
Runways
Direction	Length and surface
01/19	1,000 yards (914 m) x 30 yards (27 m) Asphalt concrete
06/24	1,000 yards (914 m) x 30 yards (27 m) Asphalt concrete
10/28	1,030 yards (942 m) x 30 yards (27 m) Asphalt concrete
15/33	1,270 yards (1,161 m) x 30 yards (27 m) Asphalt concrete
- Source: Royal Navy Research Archive

Royal Naval Air Station St Merryn, commonly referred to as RNAS St Merryn, (HMS Vulture, later HMS Curlew) is a former military airbase of the Royal Navy located 7.35 miles (11.83 km) northeast of Newquay, Cornwall and 11.8 miles (19.0 km) northwest of Bodmin, Cornwall, England.

The station served as the home for the School of Naval Air Warfare, providing both training and operational instruction for personnel of the Fleet Air Arm (FAA). Its main functions encompassed various specialised aviation support tasks, air firing instruction and fighter combat training. Operating as an all-weather airfield, it was capable of maintaining flying operations under a diverse range of conditions. It also functioned as the parent establishment for HMS Vulture II, RNAS Treligga, the FAA's live firing range & emergency landing ground.

== History ==
RNAS St Merryn was constructed during World War 2 with the stone for the runway being quarried from nearby Stepper Point and brought by sea. The airbase was commissioned into the Royal Navy on 10 August 1940 as HMS Vulture. It remained in service under this name until it was 'paid off' on 14 October 1953. The following day, on 15 October 1953, it was recommissioned as HMS Curlew.

There were air raids on St Merryn Airfield and the nearby RAF St Eval on 9 October 1940 resulting in some damage at both locations. Two days later on 11 October there was another air raid on St Merryn. There were no casualties but some damage was caused on the airfield and to nearby houses.

The station hosted the School of Naval Air Warfare, delivering both training and operational instruction for Fleet Air Arm personnel. Its primary roles included fighter combat training, air firing instruction, and a range of specialist aviation support duties. Functioning as an all-weather airfield, it was able to sustain flying operations across a wide variety of conditions. In addition to these core responsibilities, the station also trained Royal Navy (Air) Emergency List Officers, acted as the parent establishment for HMS Vulture II, the Treligga Ranges and provided facilities for several specialist units, including No. 1 Planned Inspection Application Team, No. 70 Administrative A.L. Section and No. 12 C.B.A.L. Section. It also supported the work of an Operational Research Unit, further reinforcing its importance within naval aviation operations.

=== Facilities ===
Living quarters were located on the northern and western sides of the landing area. Accommodation capacity comprised 156 officers, 1,265 chiefs, petty officers and ratings, 4 Women's Royal Naval Service (WRNS) officers, and 210 WRNS chiefs, petty officers and ratings. Aircraft dispersal facilities consisted of eight aircraft standings, four of which were suitable for heavy bombers. Four aprons were also provided off the perimeter track and within the hangar areas. Hangar areas were situated on the northern, eastern and southern sides of the airfield. The hangar complement included one Callender-Hamilton hangar 185 ft × 110 ft, two Pentad hangars both 185 ft × 105 ft, four Tee Side ‘S’ hangars each 60 ft × 70 ft, and thirteen Mains hangars constructed during the station’s expansion in 1943, including examples measuring 60 ft × 70 ft and 60 ft × 84 ft.

=== School of Naval Air Warfare ===
The School of Naval Air Warfare consisted of several Fleet Air Arm squadrons operating at the station during the Second World War and into the post-war period. 736 Naval Air Squadron, a Fighter Combat School squadron, moved to the station from RNAS Yeovilton, Somerset, on 2 September 1943 and later transferred to RNAS Culdrose, Cornwall, on 1 February 1950. Aircraft operated included the Grumman Avenger Mk.II, Fairey Barracuda Mk II, Vought Corsair Mk III, Blackburn Firebrand T.F. IV, Fairey Firefly FR.I, FR.Mk 4 and T.Mk I, North American Harvard III, Miles Master II, Supermarine Seafire Mk.Ib, Mk.III, F Mk.XV, F Mk.XVII and F Mk.46, Supermarine Spitfire Mk Va, and the Vickers Wellington GR Mark XI.

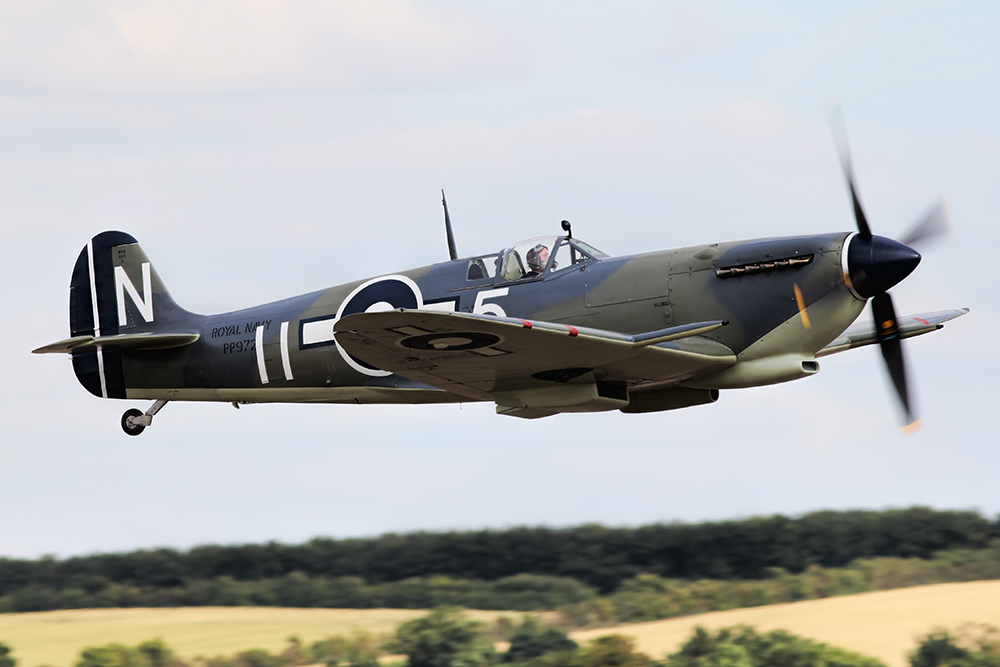
Supermarine Seafire L Mk.III; an example of the type seen at RNAS St Merryn during the Second World War

1944 saw 719 Naval Air Squadron, the Fleet Air Arm’s Fighter Air Firing Training Squadron, form at the station on 15 June 1944 and disbanded on 2 January 1945. It operated the Vought Corsair Mk III, Miles Master II, Supermarine Seafire Mk.Ib and IIc, Supermarine Spitfire Mk Vb, and the Grumman Wildcat Mk IV. This squadron was followed by 715 Naval Air Squadron, responsible for the Fighter Air Combat and Fighter Leaders Course, which was formed at the station on 17 August 1944. It operated the Supermarine Seafire L Mk.III and F Mk.XVII, Vought Corsair Mk II and Mk IV, and the North American Harvard IIb and III, before disbanding on 31 March 1946, when it was absorbed by 736 Naval Air Squadron. In the autumn 709 Naval Air Squadron, a Fighter Ground Attack School squadron, was formed at the station on 15 September. Aircraft operated included the fighter aircraft, the Supermarine Seafire L Mk.III and the Grumman Hellcat F. Mk. I and II. North American Harvard IIb and III advanced training aircraft were also used. The squadron disbanded there on 26 January 1946.

In 1945 725 Naval Air Squadron, an Air Target Towing Unit, moved to the station from RNAS Eglinton, County Londonderry, on 4 August 1945. Equipped with the Miles Martinet TT.Mk I, it carried out air target towing duties until disbanding on 27 December 1945, when it was absorbed into 736 Naval Air Squadron.

=== Support Units ===
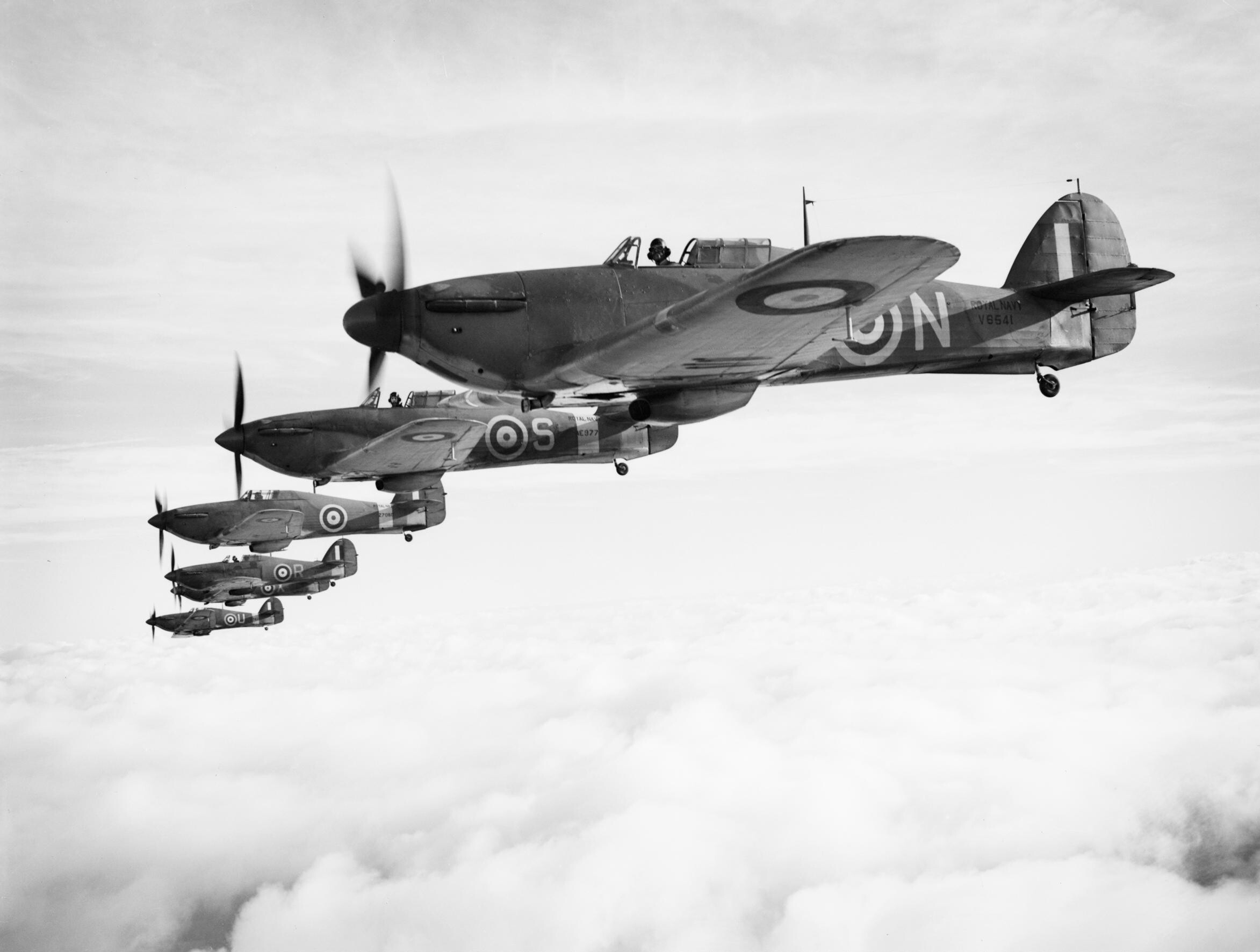
Hawker Sea Hurricanes, flying in formation, a common sight over RNAS St Merryn during the Second World War

792 Naval Air Squadron was a Fleet Air Arm Air Target Towing Unit, responsible for conducting air target towing duties in support of training. The squadron was formed at the station on 15 August 1940, and remained there until it was disbanded on 2 January 1945, when it was absorbed into 794 Naval Air Squadron. Aircraft operated by the squadron included the Avro Anson I, Boulton Paul Defiant TT Mk III, Westland Lysander Mk.III, Miles Martinet TT.Mk I, Percival Proctor IA, Blackburn Roc TT, Gloster Sea Gladiator, Hawker Sea Hurricane Mk.IA, Blackburn Skua TT, and the Miles Whitney Straight.

748 Naval Air Squadron was a Fleet Air Arm Fighter Pool Squadron. It was formed at the station on 12 October 1942, and moved to RNAS Henstridge, Somerset, on 4 February 1944. The squadron later returned from RNAS Dale, Pembrokeshire, on 14 August 1945, before disbanding at the station on 11 February 1946. Aircraft operated included the Vought Corsair Mk II, Mk III and Mk IV, Fairey Firefly I, Grumman Hellcat F. Mk. I, Hawker Hurricane Mk.I, Fairey Fulmar Mk.I and Mk.II, Miles Master I and GT.II, Supermarine Spitfire Mk I, Mk Va and MK Vb, Supermarine Seafire Mk.Ib, Mk.IIc and Mk.III, and the Grumman Wildcat Mk V and Mk VI.

741 Naval Air Squadron served as an Operational Flying Training Unit of the Fleet Air Arm. It was formed at the station on 12 August 1946, and disbanded there on 25 November 1947. Aircraft operated included the Fairey Firefly FR.I, Supermarine Seafire L Mk.III, and the North American Harvard III.

=== Specialist Training Units ===
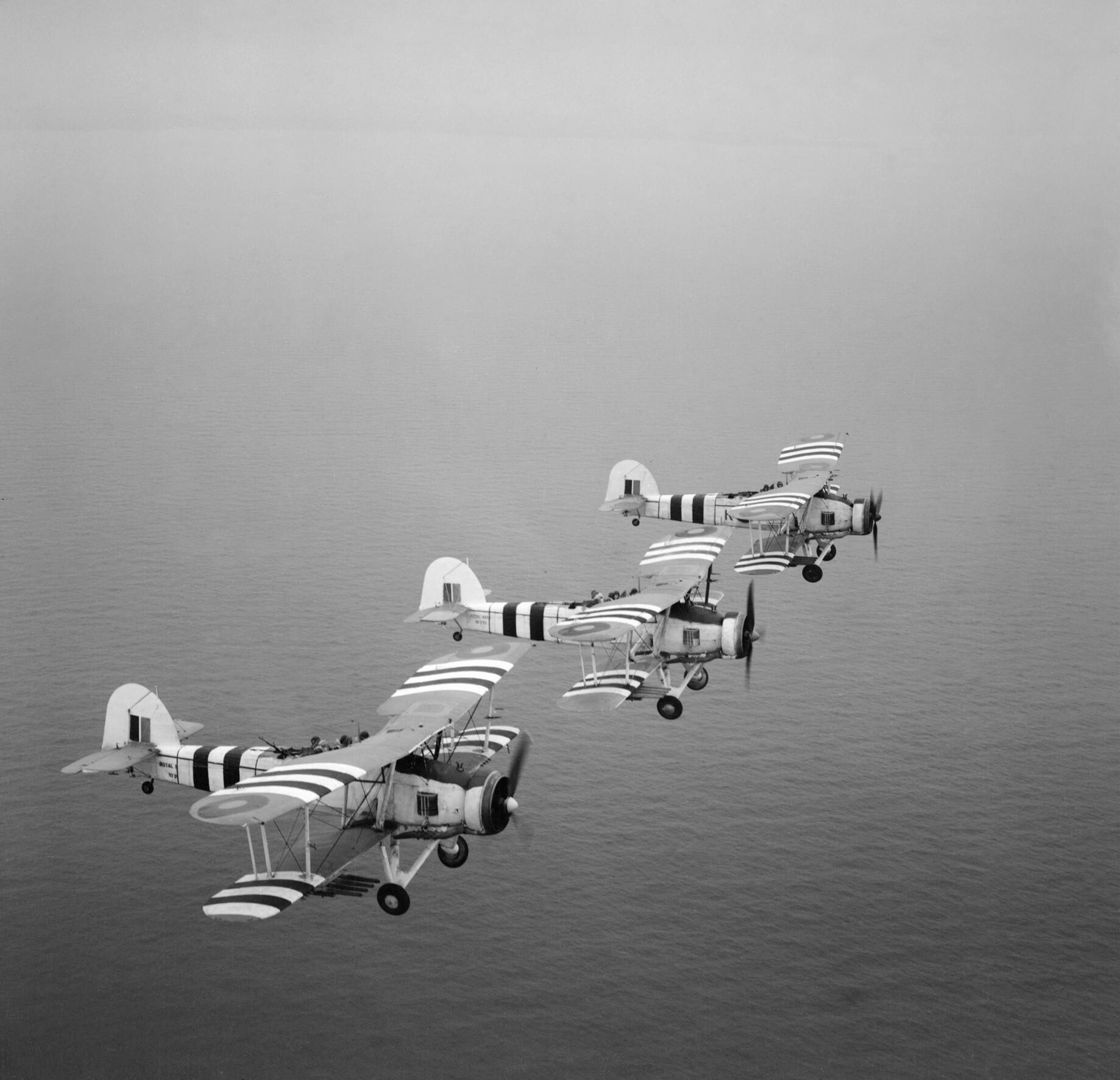
Rocket-armed Fairey Swordfish on a training flight from RNAS St Merryn, 1 August 1944.

The first specialist training unit to arrive at the naval air station during the Second World War was 774 Naval Air Squadron, which transferred from RNAS Evanton, Ross and Cromarty, on 17 September 1940. Operating as an Armament Training Squadron, it employed a wide range of aircraft, including the Fairey Albacore, Blackburn Roc, Blackburn Shark Mk II TT, Blackburn Skua, Fairey Swordfish I and II, Fairey Barracuda Mk II, and the Hawker Sea Hurricane Mk.IB. 762 Naval Air Squadron followed on 15 April 1942, having moved from RNAS Yeovilton. As an Advanced Flying Training School unit, it operated the Fairey Fulmar Mk.I and Mk.II, the Grumman Martlet Mk I, and the Miles Master I. Its stay was brief, returning to RNAS Yeovilton on 8 September 1942.

On 24 February 1943, 'Z' Flight of 787 Naval Air Squadron, part of the Fleet Fighter Development Unit, arrived from RNAS Lee-on-Solent, Hampshire. The Flight conducted its work partly from the satellite airfield at RNAS Treligga and operated aircraft such as the Fairey Fulmar Mk.I and Mk.II, Hawker Hurricane Mk.IV, Hawker Sea Hurricane Mk.Ia and Mk.IIc, and the Fairey Swordfish I and II. 'Z' Flight was disbanded at the station on 1 July 1944. 774 Squadron, which had been at the station since September 1940, moved to RNAS Rattray, Aberdeenshire, on 24 October 1944.

794 Naval Air Squadron was formed at the station on 2 January 1945 as the School of Air Firing. Its aircraft complement included the Vought Corsair Mk III, Fairey Fulmar Mk.II, North American Harvard IIb and III, Miles Martinet TT.Mk I, Miles Master II, Supermarine Seafire L Mk.III, Supermarine Spitfire Mk Vb, and the Grumman Wildcat Mk IV. The squadron relocated to RNAS Eglinton, County Londonderry, on 9 August 1945.

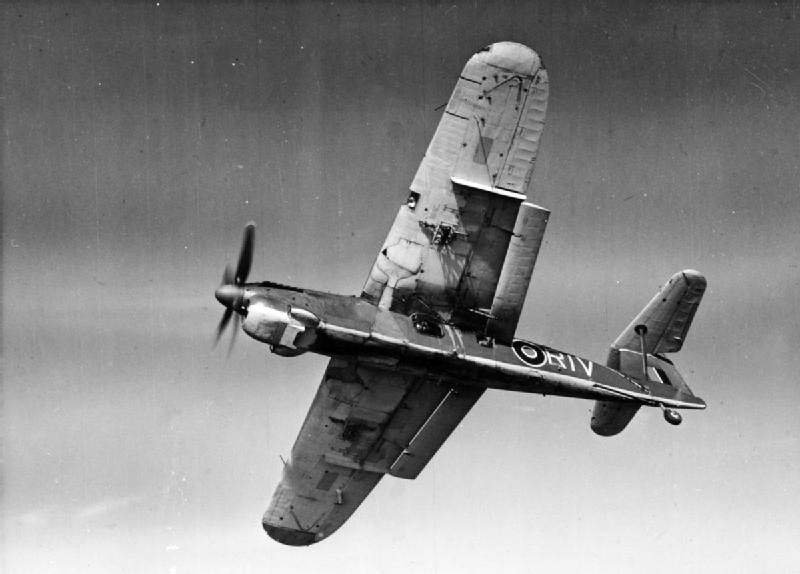
Fairey Barracuda Mk II; an example of the type seen at RNAS St Merryn

Post‑war activity expanded with the formation of 796 Naval Air Squadron on 13 November 1947. Initially an Aircrewman Training School squadron, it was redesignated as Observer School Part II in 1950. The unit operated a variety of aircraft, including the Fairey Barracuda Mk III, Fairey Firefly FR.I, AS.Mk 5, AS.Mk 6, T.Mk 3 and T.Mk 7, and the de Havilland Tiger Moth. A further development in observer training occurred on 17 April 1952 with the formation of 750 Naval Air Squadron, created from elements of 796 Squadron to take responsibility for Observer School Part II. The squadron operated the Fairey Barracuda Mk III.

From January 1953, 738 Naval Air Squadron, part of the School of Naval Air Warfare based at RNAS Culdrose, made use of the station for Aerodrome Dummy Deck Landing training. The squadron employed the Hawker Sea Fury FB.11 for this purpose. 796 Squadron left for RNAS Culdrose on 30 November 1953.

== Units ==
The following units were here at some point:

- 17th Carrier Air Group
- 21st Carrier Air Group
- No. 82 Gliding School RAF
- 709 Naval Air Squadron
- 715 Naval Air Squadron
- 719 Naval Air Squadron
- 725 Naval Air Squadron
- 736 Naval Air Squadron
- 741 Naval Air Squadron
- 748 Naval Air Squadron
- 750 Naval Air Squadron
- 762 Naval Air Squadron
- 774 Naval Air Squadron
- 787 Naval Air Squadron
- 792 Naval Air Squadron
- 794 Naval Air Squadron
- 796 Naval Air Squadron
- 800 Naval Air Squadron
- 801 Naval Air Squadron
- 802 Naval Air Squadron
- 804 Naval Air Squadron
- 807 Naval Air Squadron
- 808 Naval Air Squadron
- 809 Naval Air Squadron
- 810 Naval Air Squadron
- 813 Naval Air Squadron
- 817 Naval Air Squadron
- 819 Naval Air Squadron
- 820 Naval Air Squadron
- 825 Naval Air Squadron
- 826 Naval Air Squadron
- 828 Naval Air Squadron
- 829 Naval Air Squadron
- 836 Naval Air Squadron
- 837 Naval Air Squadron
- 860 Naval Air Squadron
- 879 Naval Air Squadron
- 880 Naval Air Squadron
- 882 Naval Air Squadron
- 883 Naval Air Squadron
- 884 Naval Air Squadron
- 885 Naval Air Squadron
- 886 Naval Air Squadron
- 887 Naval Air Squadron
- 888 Naval Air Squadron
- 891 Naval Air Squadron
- 893 Naval Air Squadron
- 895 Naval Air Squadron
- 897 Naval Air Squadron
- 1831 Naval Air Squadron
- 1832 Naval Air Squadron
- 1833 Naval Air Squadron

== Current use ==
The site is now used for farming and a small amount of aircraft flying.

== See also ==
- List of air stations of the Royal Navy
