= HMS Vulture II =

Former Royal Navy live firing range & emergency landing ground

Coordinates: 50°37′48.80″N 04°45′44.67″W

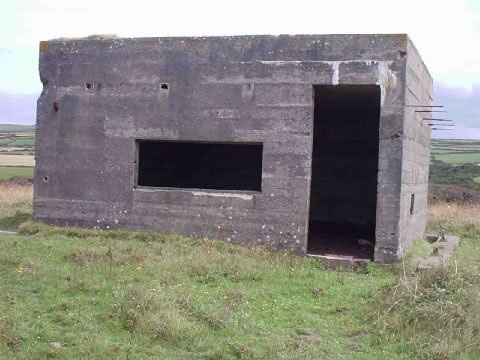
One of the concrete huts at HMS Vulture II (Treligga Aerodrome) (SX 04571 85342)

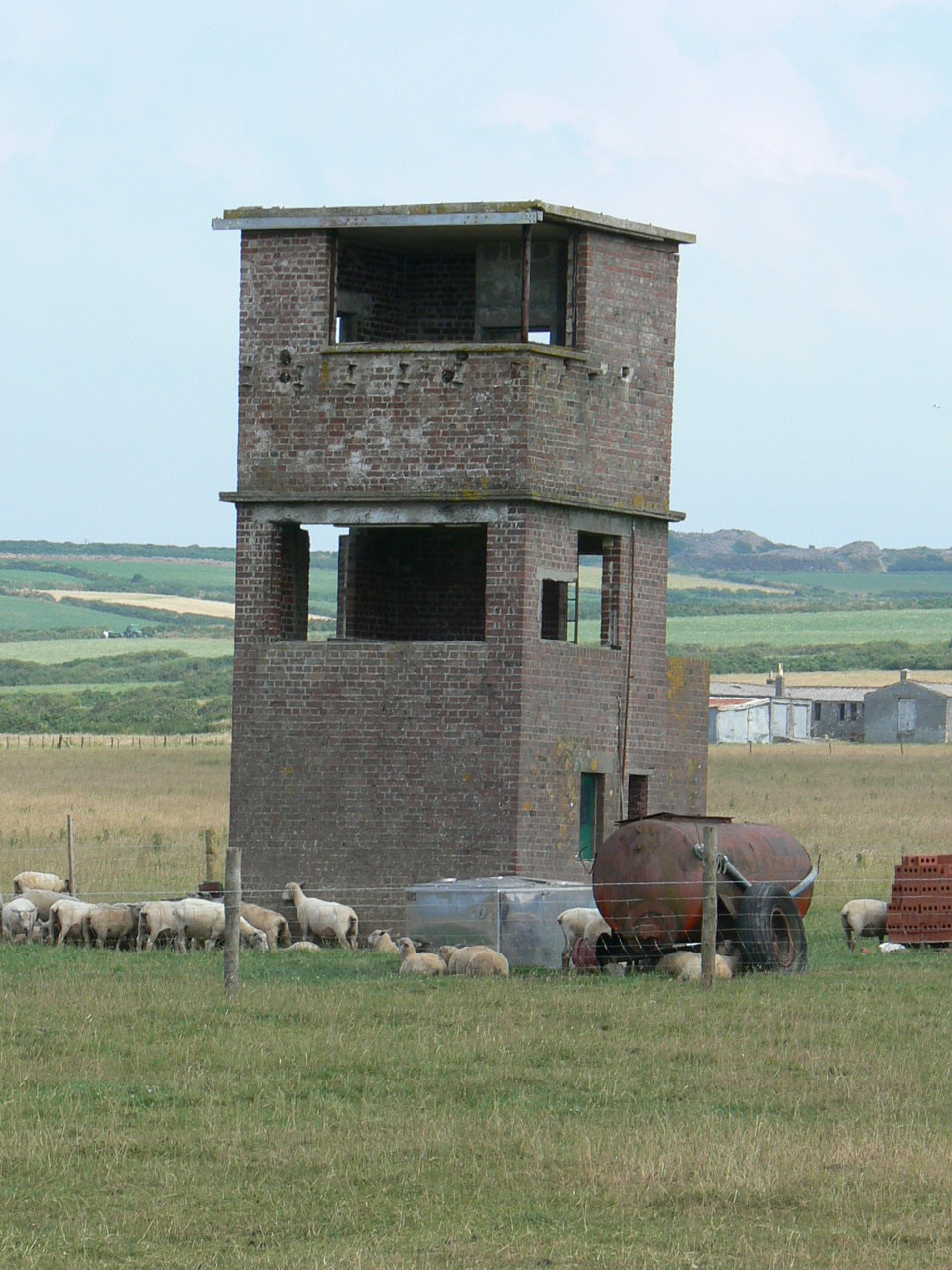
The Control/Observation Tower at HMS Vulture II (Treligga)

HMS Vulture II was an aerial bombing and gunnery range at Treligga, 2 km west of Delabole, Cornwall, England, United Kingdom (SX 047 848). The station was a satellite of the Fleet Air Arm base RNAS St Merryn (HMS Vulture) near Padstow, Cornwall. Although HMS Vulture II had landing strips they were however rarely used. Unusually, the entire operation at HMS Vulture II was staffed by the Women's Royal Naval Service.

== Uses ==
Before the Second World War HMS Vulture II was used as a glider site. However the Admiralty requisitioned some 260 acres (1.1 km^{2}) of land (between Tregardock and Backways Cove) in late 1939 for the purposes of constructing a bombing (air to ground) and gunnery (air to sea) range.

It was decided that three grass landing strips would be marked out at HMS Vulture II (between Tregonnick Tail and Treligga village, each around 580 metres long) so that if an aircraft sustained engine failure or ricochet damage whilst firing on the range, it would be possible to land. This involved a lot of earth moving and heavy machinery was brought in to complete the work. To the north of the tower, the head of a valley was filled and levelled. The ground on the landing strips was considered too rough for normal take offs and landings. The landing strips were intended only for belly landings (wheels-up), in an emergency. Later however the surface was improved and some traffic did use the landing strips.

== Planes which used HMS Vulture II ==
Squadrons using the range included the Fighter Pool 748 Squadron, and the School of Air Combat 736 Squadron.

- Avro Lancaster
- Avro Shackleton
- De Havilland Mosquito
- Fairey Albacore (target towing)
- Fairey Barracuda
- Fairey Firefly
- Fairey Gannet
- Fairey Swordfish
- Hawker Hurricane
- Hawker Sea Fury
- Lockheed P-2 Neptune
- Miles Master
- Short Sunderland
- Supermarine Seafire
- Supermarine Spitfire

== Buildings ==
Several buildings were constructed the most obvious being a 10 metre high brick control/observation tower in the middle of the area. Towards Backways Cove and located in what was the main ground target area there is a reinforced concrete marker shelter where the markers (naval personnel)scored and repaired/maintained the six gunnery targets located either side of the shelter. Accommodation for the Wrens was built on the Delabole side of Port Gaverne and early in its life HMS Vulture II was unique in being run entirely by Wrens. Later the base was run by Fleet Air Arm personnel, some living on the site and some commuting from St Merryn. Facilities eventually included a grass tennis court for the WRENS to use. The tennis posts were still extant into the early 1990s.

Off-site were other associated buildings, at Treligga Downs near the building later renamed the Poldark Inn, a building was used for counting holes in drogue targets. These were dropped by towing aircraft and retrieved by the Wrens, who laid them out on long tables and counted the holes. A reward of five shillings (25p) was offered to any member of the public who found a missing target. There was a further dive screen shelter (block built) in afield near Trebarwith Village and targets were positioned in Port Isaac bay for air to sea attacks. Near the cliff at Dannon Chapel was a quadrant shelter (equipped with a quadrant) which was used to assess the accuracy of attacks on floating bombing targets. This shelter (useful for walkers on the coastal footpath) was demolished in the late 1990s when the National Trust decided it was an eyesore.

== HMS Vulture II modelled on a Pacific island ==
When action moved to the Japanese war in the Pacific HMS Vulture II was adapted to represent the typical lay-out of a Japanese-held territory and was modelled on the island of Tarawa. Real and dummy tanks, a bridge and a road convoy were located near one of the airstrips and a small railway was built to provide moving targets. By December 1944 squadron commanders and senior pilots destined for the Pacific were using it for intensive training. The tanks which numbered at least 6 and possibly 10 arrived at Delabole by rail and were driven through the village from the station to Treligga, several front steps and gates and at least one small building were demolished by the tanks during this operation.

== Post World War II ==
After the war, the range continued in operation for the School of Naval Air Warfare and was in great demand by squadrons detached to RNAS St Merryn for armament practice until the early 1950s. It has been recalled that Treligga was used as an air to ground rocket range and rocket firing became a daily occurrence. In particular Fairey Gannets using the range would continuously fire rockets from a release point near Trecarne Quarry for several hours and must have kept the ground crews at RNAS St Merryn busy in rapid reloading and turnaround since these Gannets could only carry 6 rockets. As naval use declined, it was also made available to the RAF and Shackleton squadrons from the base at RAF St Eval used it for air-to-ground firing at tanks fitted with recording equipment. But with the withdrawal of lying units from RNAS St Merryn in 1954 and changes made to Shackletons during 1955, the range was closed at the end of that year and quickly reverted to farmland.

== Emergency landing of a B-17 Flying Fortress ==
On 16 September 1943 an American B-17 Flying Fortress was forced to make an emergency landing at HMS Vulture II. The pilot, Capt Jack Omohundro had ignored a red flare warning him to keep clear. The plane was chronically short of fuel and running on three engines after a raid on U-boat pens at Nantes in France. The bomber had left its formation to try to preserve what little fuel it had left. Spotting the tiny Treligga airstrip, he skillfully landed 'wheels-down' just 50 yards (46 m) short of the Wrens quarters. When the Americans stepped out of their aircraft they were amazed to find HMS Vulture II entirely in the hands of Wrens. After a meal and a nights sleep, the B-17 had to be stripped down for a successful take-off out over the sea a skeleton crew then flew the B-17 to RAF coastal command station at RAF St Eval for full refuelling and a safety check.

== Crashes ==
There have been a number of air crashes whilst the range was in use. One occurred when a Seafire crashed into the railway embankment near Barton Farm at 2.00 pm on Thursday 1 November 1951. The pilot was killed. There have been other crashes near Barton Farm including a C-47 Skytrain carrying South African soldiers which was attempting a landing on one of the large fields to the north east of the farm. Other crashes include a Swordfish in Trebarwith Valley with three fatalities, a further Swordfish at sea and possibly a Blenheim near Tregonnick Farm.

== HMS Vulture II today ==
Both the observation/control tower and the reinforced hut near the sea (towards Backways Cove) are derelict but still standing as are the accommodation and service huts near Treligga village. All are in remarkably good structural condition considering their age and exposed position.
