= Ronald Scott (aviator) =

British-Argentine aviator (1917–2025)

- Born: 20 October 1917; Villa Devoto, Buenos Aires, Argentina
- Died: 17 April 2025 (aged 107)
- Military career
- Allegiance: United Kingdom
- Branch: Royal Navy
- Years of service: 1942–1945
- Rank: Sub-lieutenant
- Service number: 582095
- Unit: 794 Naval Air Squadron
- Conflict: Second World War
- Awards: 1939–1945 Star
- Other work: Commercial pilot

Ronald David Scott (20 October 1917 – 17 April 2025) was an Argentine-born British naval aviator who flew for the Royal Navy's Fleet Air Arm during World War II.

Scott was featured in the short film Buena Onda: The Tale of Ronny Scott in 2021.

== Career ==
I was born in Villa Devoto, certainly, but what else could I do but go to war? When someone like Hitler kills the number of people he ended up massacring, I think something has to be done. That's what I felt. Beyond coming from a family of British origin, I felt it was my obligation as a human being.

Son of a veteran soldier from Scotland and a nurse from England, in 1942 at the age of 25, Scott signed up to the Royal Navy at the British Embassy in Buenos Aires, where he fought as a volunteer until the end of the Second World War, where he was awarded the 1939–1945 Star.

== Later life and death ==
Scott later returned to Argentina where he flew as a commercial pilot for Aeroposta Argentina, flying Douglas DC-3 aircraft to Patagonia. When Aeroposta merged with Aerolíneas Argentinas, he continued to fly, captaining a Douglas DC-4 and a Comet 4 before culminating his career flying the Boeing 747. He retired after logging over 23000 flight hours.

Scott lived in the Buenos Aires suburb of San Isidro and was the last surviving Spitfire pilot in Latin America. In 2021, he was made a life member of the Fleet Air Arm Officer's Association by Vice-Admiral Sir Adrian Johns, the former Second Sea Lord. Scott died on 17 April 2025, at the age of 107.
