= 748 Naval Air Squadron =

Inactive flying squadron of the Royal Navy's Fleet Air Arm

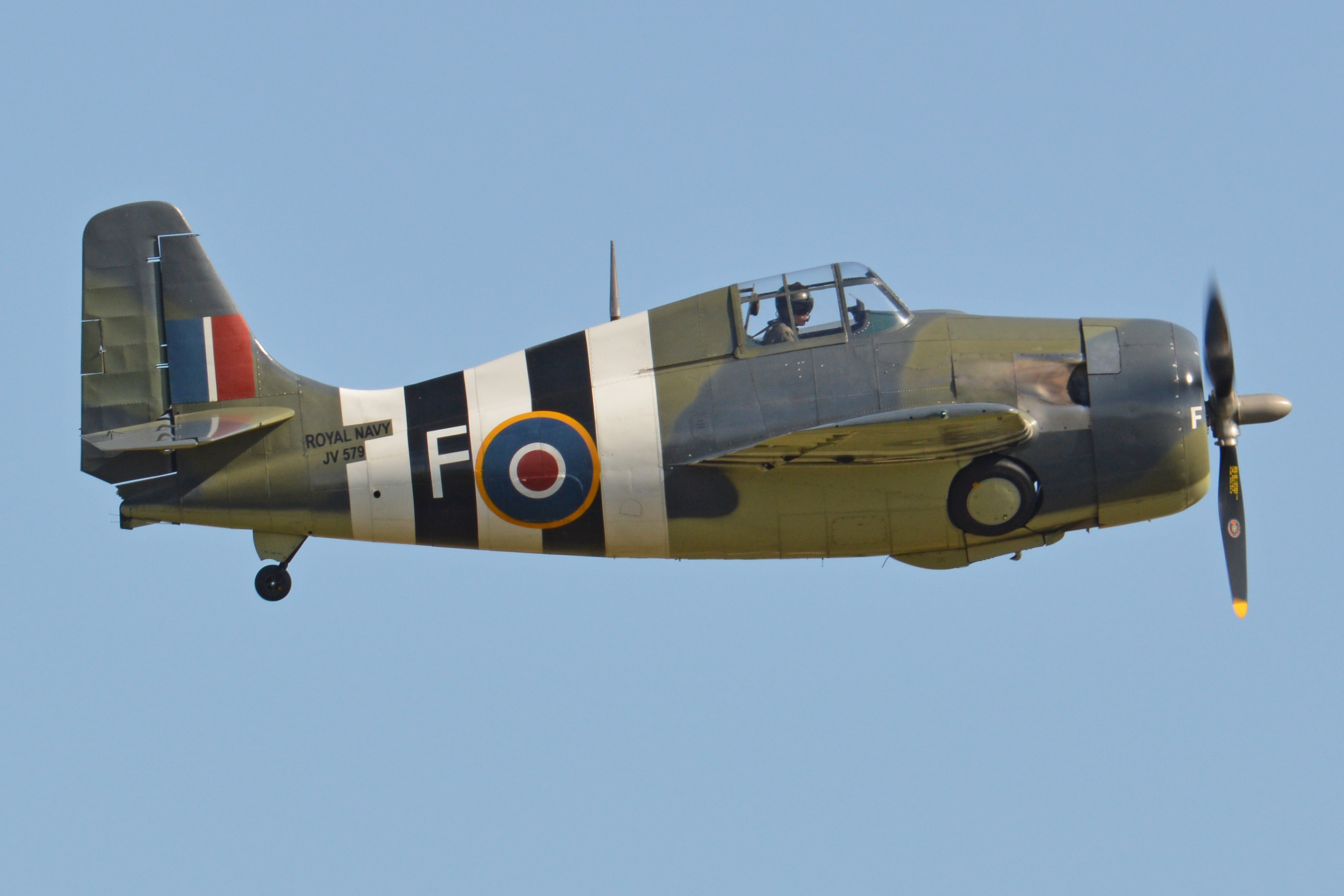
- Grumman Wildcat, similar to the type used by 748 NAS
- Active: 1942–1946
- Disbanded: 11 February 1946
- Country: United Kingdom
- Branch: Royal Navy
- Type: Fleet Air Arm Second Line Squadron
- Role: Fighter Pool Squadron; No. 10 Naval Operational Training Unit
- Size: Squadron
- Part of: Fleet Air Arm
- Home station: See Naval air stations section for full list.
- Motto: ‘We labour that others may learn’
- Aircraft: See Aircraft flown section for full list.

Insignia
- Squadron Badge: Winged crown and wreaths to the left a sun and four rays. Wartime unofficial
- Identification Markings: S7A+ (all types); P7A+ (from October 1944); S7A+ (from August 1945)

748 Naval Air Squadron (748 NAS), also known as 748 Squadron, is an inactive Fleet Air Arm (FAA) naval air squadron of the United Kingdom’s Royal Navy (RN). It was last active as the No. 10 Naval Operational Training Unit, having initially formed as a Fighter Pool Squadron, at HMS Vulture, RNAS St Merryn, Cornwall.

The squadron moved to RNAS Henstridge, (commissioned HMS Dipper), Dorset, in February 1944 and then onto RNAS Yeovilton (HMS Heron), Somerset, in the March. In September 1944, the squadron moved to RNAS Dale (HMS Goldcrest), Pembrokeshire, in Wales, remaining for just under twelve months, before moving back to HMS Vulture, RNAS St Merryn in August 1945, where it disbanded in February 1946. During its existence, the squadron flew various marks of numerous aircraft types, operated by the Fleet Air Arm.

== History ==
=== Fighter Pool Squadron (1942–1943) ===
748 Naval Air Squadron was formed at RNAS St Merryn (HMS Vulture), which is located 7.35 miles (11.83 km) northeast of Newquay, Cornwall, as a Fighter Pool Squadron on 12 October 1942. It was initially equipped with four Fairey Fulmar, a British carrier-borne reconnaissance aircraft / fighter aircraft, four Grumman Martlet, an American carrier-based fighter aircraft, four Supermarine Spitfire, a British single-seat fighter aircraft and four Hawker Hurricane, also British single-seat fighter aircraft.

=== No. 10 Naval Operational Training Unit (1943–1946) ===
In early 1943, 748 Naval Air Squadron became No. 10 Operational Training Unit, adding Supermarine Seafire aircraft, a navalised version of the Supermarine Spitfire specifically adapted for operation from aircraft carriers, to its inventory. On 4 February 1944, it left RNAS St Merryn and moved to RNAS Henstridge (HMS Dipper), situated approxiamately 6 miles (9.7 km) east of Sherborne in the South Somerset district, near the border with Dorset, here it also received Supermarine Spitfire Vb, Miles Martinet, a target tug aircraft and Stinson Reliant, an American liaison and training monoplane. However, within five weeks of arriving, the squadron was on the move again, reloacting to RNAS Yeovilton (HMS Heron), sited a few miles north of Yeovil, in Somerset, on 9 March 1944.

Six months later and 748 Naval Air Squadron relocated again. On 1 September 1944 the squadron was transferred to RNAS Dale (HMS Goldcrest), a Fleet Air Arm airbase located 6.5 miles (10.5 km) west of Milford Haven, Pembrokeshire, Wales. By this time the squadron was equipped with Vought Corsair, an American fighter aircraft, North American Harvard, an American single-engined advanced trainer aircraft, Fairey Firefly, a carrier-borne fighter and anti-submarine aircraft, Grumman Hellcat, an American carrier-based fighter aircraft, Supermarine Seafire and Grumman Wildcat another American carrier-based fighter aircraft. The squadron remained at RNAS Dale for almost one year before returning to RNAS St Merryn on the 14 August 1945. 748 Naval Air Squadron remained there for a further six months, disbanding on the 11 February 1946.

== Aircraft flown ==
The squadron was equipped with numerous types and marks of aircraft operated by the Fleet Air Arm including:

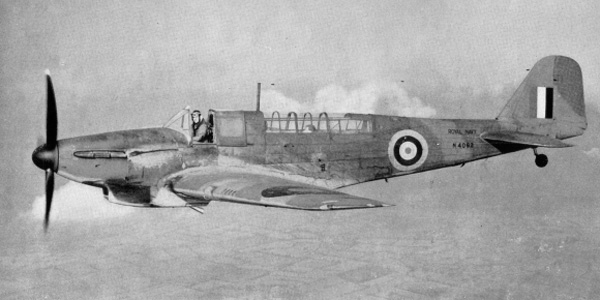
Fairey Fulmar Mk II

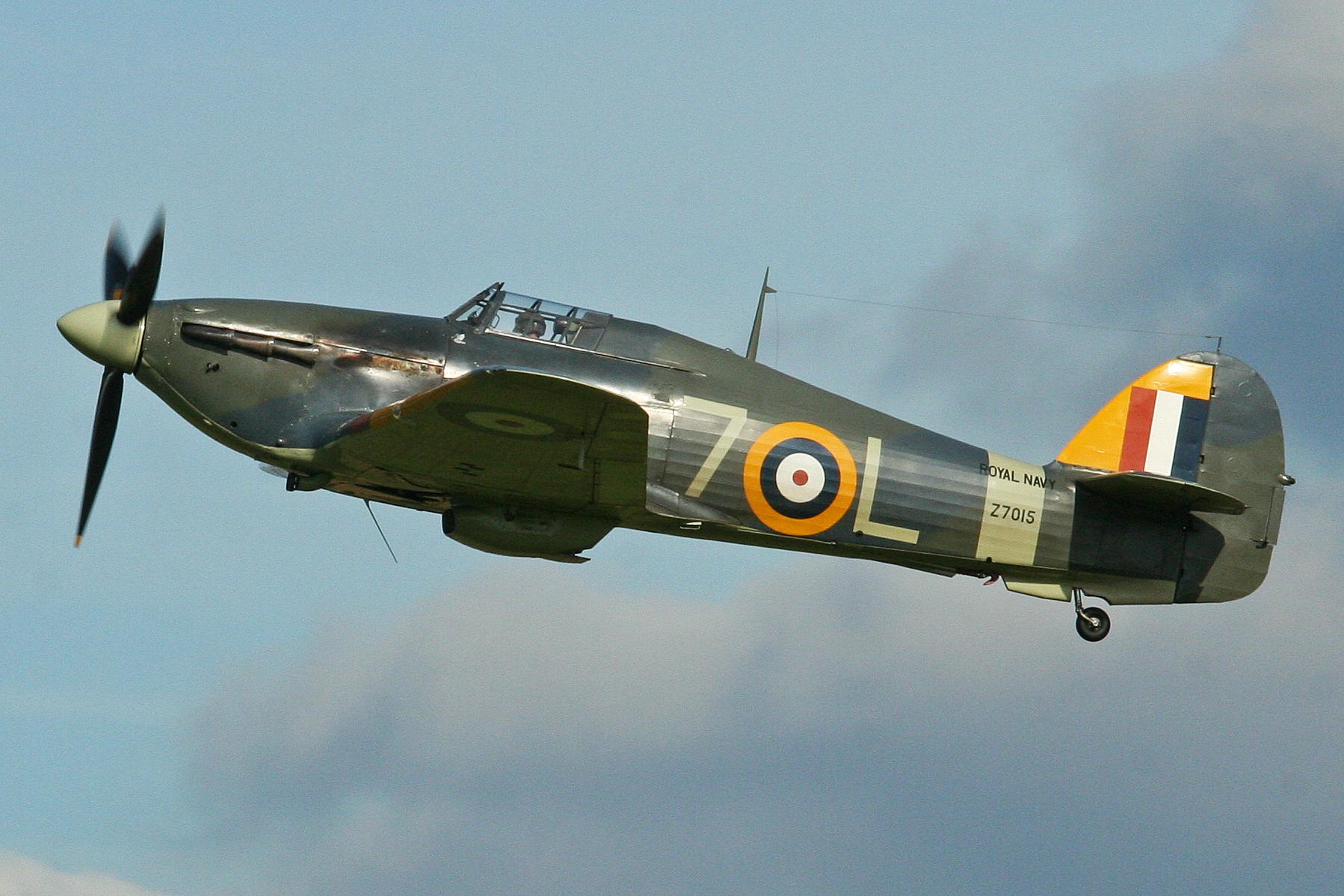
Hawker Sea Hurricane Mk Ib

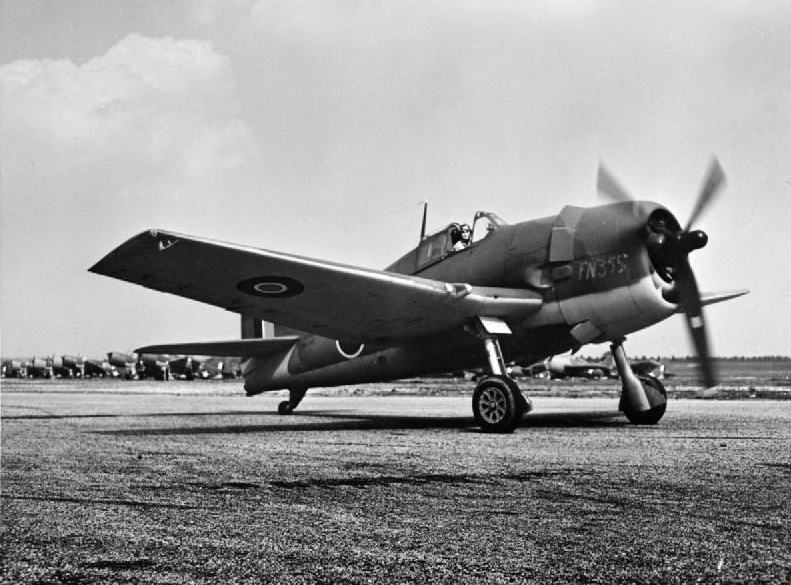
Grumman Hellcat F. Mk. I

- Fairey Fulmar Mk.II reconnaissance/fighter aircraft (October 1942 - March 1943)
- Fairey Fulmar Mk.I reconnaissance/fighter aircraft (October 1942 - April 1943)
- Supermarine Spitfire Mk I fighter aircraft (October 1942 - April 1943)
- Hawker Hurricane Mk I fighter aircraft (October 1942 - December 1943)
- Miles Master I advanced trainer aircraft (October 1942 - January 1944)
- Grumman Martlet Mk I fighter aircraft (October 1942 - January 1944)
- Supermarine Spitfire Mk Vb fighter aircraft (December 1942)
- Percival Proctor Ia deck landing and radio trainer aircraft (January - March 1943)
- Hawker Sea Hurricane Mk Ib fighter aircraft (February - July 1943)
- Supermarine Spitfire Mk Va fighter aircraft (February 1943 - July 1944)
- Supermarine Seafire F Mk IIc fighter aircraft (March 1943 - February 1946)
- Hawker Sea Hurricane Mk IIc fighter aircraft (June 1943 - February 1944)
- Supermarine Seafire Mk Ib fighter aircraft (June 1943 - February 1946)
- Grumman Martlet Mk IV fighter aircraft (September 1943 - September 1944)
- Bristol Blenheim Mk.IV light bomber (November 1943 - March 1944)
- Stinson Reliant liaison and training aircraft (November 1943 - July 1944)
- Vought Corsair Mk II fighter-bomber (March 1944 - 1945)
- Vought Corsair Mk IV fighter-bomber (March 1944 - January 1945)
- Grumman Hellcat F. Mk. I fighter aircraft (May 1944 - May 1945)
- Miles Master GT.II glider tug (May 1944 - August 1945)
- Vought Corsair Mk III fighter aircraft (May 1944 - November 1945)
- Fairey Firefly FR.I fighter/reconnaissance aircraft (June 1944 - June 1945)
- Supermarine Spitfire Mk Vb (hooked) fighter aircraft (March 1945 - February 1946)
- Grumman Wildcat Mk V fighter aircraft (May 1945 - March 1946)
- North American Harvard III/hooked advanced trainer aircraft (June 1945 - February 1946)
- Grumman Wildcat Mk VI fighter aircraft (September 1945 - March 1946)
- Supermarine Seafire F Mk III fighter aircraft (November 1945 - February 1946)

== Naval air stations ==
748 Naval Air Squadron operated from a number of naval air stations of the Royal Navy, in Wales and England:

- Royal Naval Air Station St Merryn (HMS Vulture), Cornwall, (12 October 1942 - 4 February 1944)
  - Royal Air Force Chivenor, Devon, (Detachment 2 September 1944 - 3 February 1944)
  - Royal Naval Air Station Yeovilton (HMS Heron), Somerset, ('B' Flight 11 October 1943 - 1 February 1943)
- Royal Naval Air Station Henstridge (HMS Dipper), Somerset, (1 February 1944 - 9 March 1944)
- Royal Naval Air Station Yeovilton (HMS Heron), Somerset, (9 March 1944 - 1 September 1944)
- Royal Naval Air Station Dale (HMS Goldcrest), Pembrokeshire, (1 September 1944 - 14 August 1945)
- Royal Naval Air Station St Merryn (HMS Vulture), Cornwall, (14 August 1945 - 11 February 1946)
  - Royal Air Force Davidstow Moor, Cornwall, (ADDLs 14 August 1945 - 11 February 1946)
- disbanded - (11 February 1946)

== Commanding officers ==
List of commanding officers of 748 Naval Air Squadron with date of appointment:

- Lieutenant Commander(A) R.G. French, RNVR, from 12 October 1942
- Lieutenant Commander B.H.C. Nation, RN, from 5 November 1943
- Lieutenant Commander J.G. Smith, RNVR, from 20 July 1944
- Lieutenant Commander(A) P.J.E. Nichols, RNVR, from 5 August 1945
- Lieutenant Commander(A) P.C.S. Chilton, RN, from 17 December 1945
- disbanded - 11 February 1946

Note: Abbreviation (A) signifies Air Branch of the RN or RNVR.
