= Tregardock and Treligga =

Hamlet in Cornwall, England

Coordinates: 50.622°N 4.773°W

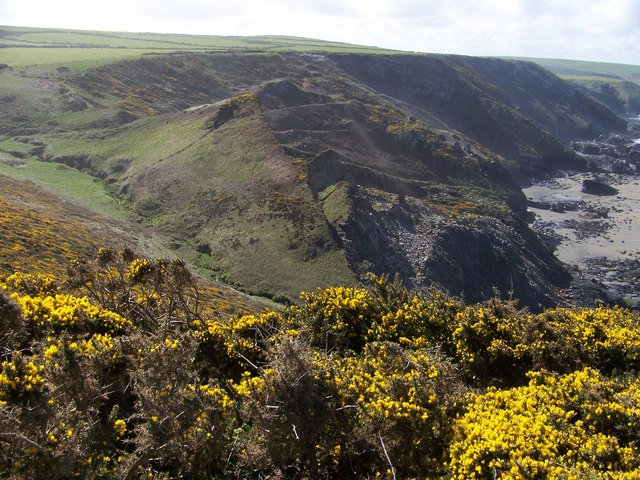
The Mountain, near Tregardock

Tregardock (Cornish: Tregaradek, meaning homestead of Caradoc) is a coastal hamlet and beach in the civil parish of Delabole in north Cornwall, England, United Kingdom. It is situated between Trebarwith Strand and Port Gaverne. The small beach is accessed by climbing down the cliffs near the settlement of Tregardock.

The manor of Tregardock was recorded in the Domesday Book (1086) when it was held by Alfward from Robert, Count of Mortain; he had also held it before 1066. There was half a hide of land and land for 3 ploughs. There were two and a half ploughs, 2 serfs, 4 villeins, 6 smallholders, 10 acres of pasture and 50 sheep. The value of the manor was 10 shillings though it had formerly been worth £1 sterling.

The manor of Treligga was recorded in the Domesday Book (1086) when it was held by Odo from Robert, Count of Mortain. There was 1 hide of land and land for 2 ploughs. There were 1 plough, 2 serfs, 1 villein, 2 smallholders and 6 acres of pasture. The value of the manor was 5 shillings though it had formerly been worth 10 shillings.

Treligga adjoining Tregardock was the location of a Second World War aerial bombing and gunnery range at Treligga aerodrome, 2 km west of Delabole.

== Popular culture ==
Tregardock is featured heavily in Richard Beard's memoir The Day That Went Missing: A Family's Story; his younger brother drowned there at the age of nine, while the two of them were swimming together on a family vacation in 1978.

Tregardock is also mentioned fondly by Ralph Clark, a British lieutenant on the First Fleet to arrive in Australia in 1788. In his journals, Clark dreams that he "was going down to Tregadock (sic) to take leave of [the family] before I went down to the Botany"
