= Detachment (military) =

Type of military unit

A detachment (from the French détachement) is a military unit. It can either be detached from a larger unit for a specific function or (particularly in United States military usage) be a permanent unit smaller than a battalion. The term is often used to refer to a unit that is assigned to a different base from the parent unit. An example is the United States Army's 1st Special Forces Operational Detachment-Delta (Airborne) (SFOD-D), commonly known as Delta Force by the general public.

Detachment is also the term used as the collective noun for personnel manning an artillery piece (e.g. gun detachment).

== Use by Cadet forces in the United Kingdom ==
The Army Cadet Force in the United Kingdom breaks its structure down into local detachments which usually consist of between 10 and 40 cadets. Several detachments make up a company.

The Combined Cadet Force, however, does not use this term. Individual units are known as Cadet Contingents.
