= Navalised aircraft =

Aircraft designed for naval usage

Silhouettes of the Westland Scout and its navalised Wasp counterpart

A navalised aircraft (or navalized aircraft) is an aircraft that is designed for naval usage. A navalised aircraft specifically designed to take off and land from the flight deck of an aircraft carrier is called a carrier-based aircraft.

Navalised aircraft include both fixed-wing (including seaplanes, biplanes, monoplanes and flying wings, both propeller- and jet-propelled) and rotary-wing aircraft (helicopters, tiltrotors and, in some cases, multicopters). In many cases, the aircraft is simply a modified variant of a land-based model. They are different to land-based aircraft in that they are designed to tolerate greater corrosion due to humidity and salt weathering around marine environments, handle increased mechanical stress due to harsher air conditions such as strong sea breezes and extreme weathers, and often need to operate on moving vessels at sea, which typically dictates more complex flight control to deal with unsteady sea state and also the ability to perform vertical/short takeoff and landing as there are very limited runway spaces available (or none at all) on deck.

== Characteristics ==
A navalised aircraft typically differs from its land-based equivalent by:

- Marinization of the airframe, engine and avionics against saltwater corrosion.
- Design features for operation from a flight deck. For fixed-wing aircraft, this typically means proportionally larger wings, higher thrust-to-weight ratio, specialized hardpoints for catapult attachment (typically on the nose gear), a tailhook for engaging arresting gears, and strengthened undercarriage. Naval helicopters usually have wheels rather than skids, and may have attachment mechanisms for safe fixation onto the deck.
- Compact profiles to occupy minimum hangar or deck space, such as folding/swing wings and folding tail boom.
- Enhanced protection against water ingress (including that from hosing down with fresh water to rinse off salt water).
- Equipment such as sensors and weapons are optimised for naval roles.
- The avionics is compatible with the complex electronic equipment of a warship, and that there is no electromagnetic interference between the two.
- There is provision for ditching at sea in case of emergency.
- Helicopters may have provision for refuelling while hovering adjacent to a ship.

For safety reasons, the aviation fuel provided by ships may be different (e.g. AVCAT) from that provided by airfields and tanker aircraft.

== Examples ==
The T-45 Goshawk is a navalised version of the BAE Hawk jet trainer. Differences from the Hawk include changes to the undercarriage for aircraft carrier compatibility and a strengthened airframe. The engine design was also modified for the aircraft's role at sea. A proposed navalised version of the Alpha Jet would have had similar design modifications.

Other examples of navalised variants of land-based aircraft include:

- Bell AH-1 SuperCobra
- British Aerospace Sea Harrier
- Dassault Rafale M
- HAL Tejas Naval
- Hawker Sea Fury
- Hawker Sea Hurricane
- Lockheed Martin F-35C Lightning II
- Mikoyan MiG-29K
- North American FJ-2 & FJ-3 Fury
- Sukhoi Su-33
- Supermarine Seafire
- Sikorsky SH-60 Seahawk

== See also ==
- Index of aviation articles
- Flying submarine
- Seaplane
