= 841 Naval Air Squadron =

Inactive flying squadron of the Royal Navy's Fleet Air Arm

- Squadron badge
- Active: 1942–1943; 1944
- Disbanded: 28 November 1944
- Country: United Kingdom
- Branch: Royal Navy
- Type: Torpedo Bomber Reconnaissance squadron
- Role: Carrier-based: anti-submarine warfare (ASW); anti-surface warfare (ASuW)
- Part of: Fleet Air Arm
- Home station: See Naval air stations section for full list.
- Engagements: World War II: European theatre of World War II
- Battle honours: English Channel 1943; Norway 1944

Commanders
- Notable commanders: Lieutenant Commander(A) William Francis Cuthbert Garthwaite, DSC, RNVR

Insignia
- Squadron Badge Description: Blue, a barn owl Tyto alba affronty proper perched upon a beam white holding in his dexter claw a mouse also white (1943)
- Identification Markings: uncoded, later 5A+ (Albacore); single letters (Barracuda); 2A+ (Barracuda November 1944)

Aircraft flown
- Bomber: Fairey Albacore; Fairey Swordfish; Fairey Barracuda

841 Naval Air Squadron (841 NAS) was a Fleet Air Arm (FAA) naval air squadron of the United Kingdom’s Royal Navy (RN). The squadron was last operational during 1944 and flew Fairey Barracuda torpedo and dive bomber aircraft.

It was established at HMS Daedalus, RNAS Lee-on-Solent, in July 1942, as a special duty Torpedo Bomber Reconnaissance (TBR) unit. Operating under the RAF, the squadron relocated to RAF Middle Wallop in August and then later to RAF Manston, where it carried out ninety-nine night attacks against enemy shipping and E-boats. In early 1943, detachments were set up at RAF Coltishall, RAF Exeter, and RAF Tangmere, and in May, it absorbed part of 823 Naval Air Squadron, eventually expanding its fleet of aircraft. The squadron was disbanded at RAF Manston in December, with its responsibilities and aircraft transferred to the RCAF's 415 Squadron.

The squadron was reformed at RNAS Lee-on-Solent in February 1944, as a TBR unit and moved to HMS Owl, RNAS Fearn at the end of the month for training. In June 1944, it was assigned to the 2nd Naval TBR Wing at HMS Landrail, RNAS Machrihanish and joined the aircraft carrier HMS Formidable for 6 days in August 1944. Later that month, it transferred to HMS Implacable. The squadron conducted anti-submarine and anti-shipping operations off Norway in October 1944 before being disbanded into 828 Naval Air Squadron at HMS Sparrowhaw, RNAS Hatson, Mainland, Orkney, in November 1944.

== History ==
=== Torpedo, bomber, reconnaissance squadron (1942-1943) ===
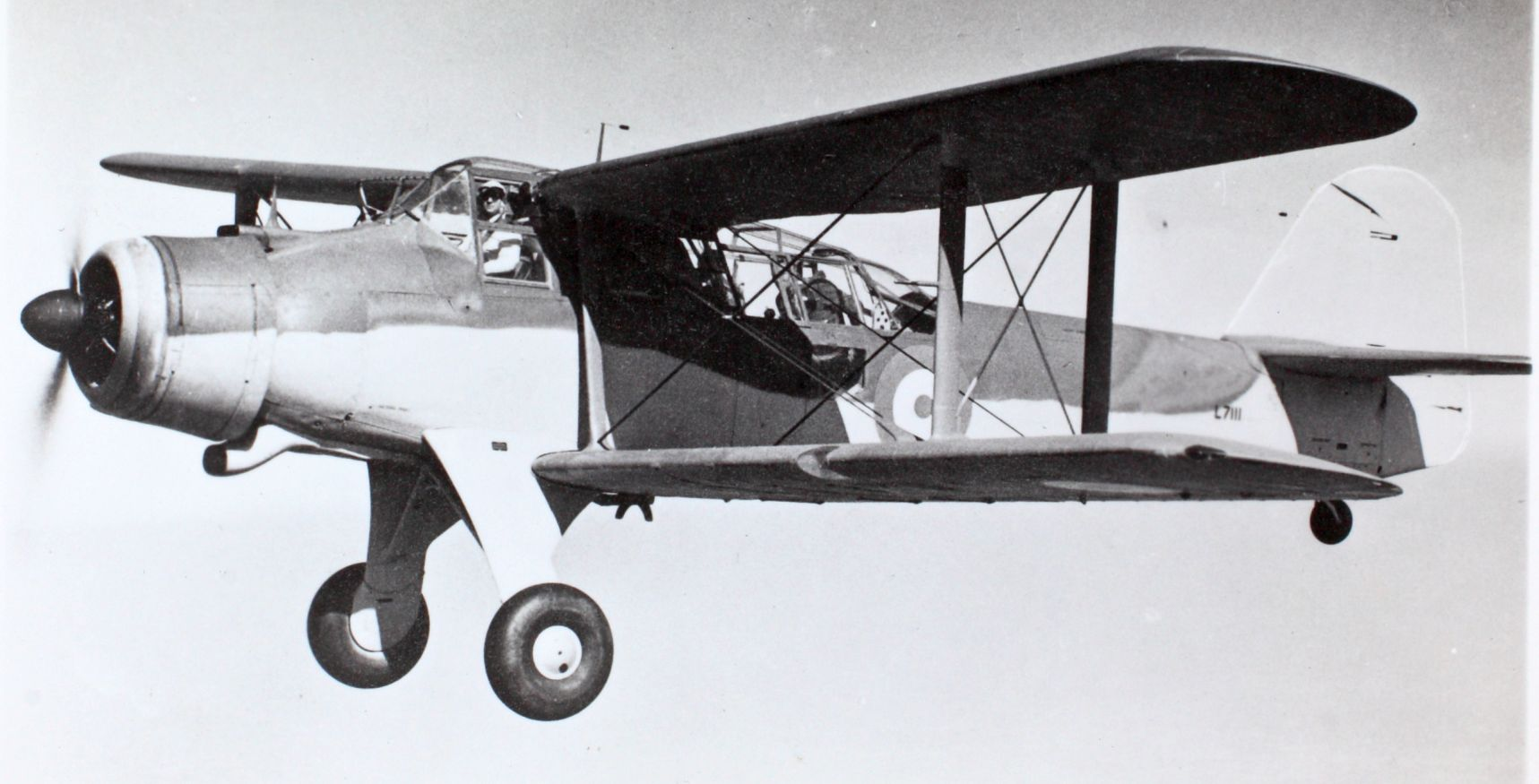
Fairey Albacore; an example of the type used by 841 Squadron

841 Naval Air Squadron was established on 1 July 1942 at HMS Daedalus, the Royal Naval Air Station located in Lee-on-Solent, Hampshire. It was created as a Torpedo Bomber Reconnaissance (TBR) squadron designated for special operations, initially comprising two Fairey Albacore torpedo bombers, which increased to four aircraft the subsequent month.

Throughout the majority of its operational history, it was assigned to the RAF Coastal Command, beginning at RAF Middle Wallop in Hampshire and subsequently relocating to RAF Manston in Kent in late August. During this period, it conducted nighttime operations targeting enemy shipping and E-boats in the Dover Straits and the English Channel, totaling ninety-nine attacks.

In the early part of the subsequent year, several detachments were deployed from RAF Coltishall in Norfolk, RAF Exeter in Devon and RAF Tangmere in Sussex. On 31 May, these detachments incorporated a portion of 823 Naval Air Squadron, ultimately comprising a total of sixteen Fairey Albacore and three Fairey Swordfish torpedo bomber aircraft.

The squadron disbanded at RAF Manston on 1 December, its responsibilities and aircraft were transferred to the Royal Canadian Air Force's 415 Squadron.

=== Barracuda (1944) ===
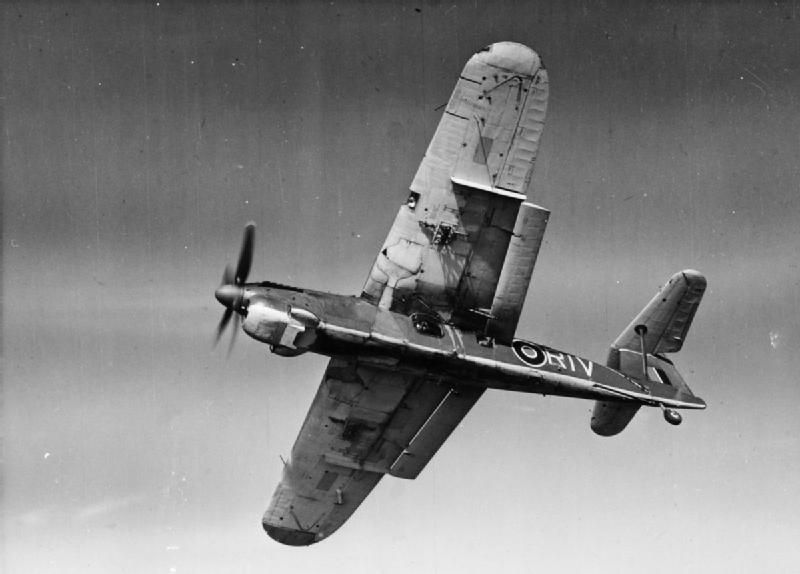
Fairey Barracuda Mk II; an example of the type used by 841 Squadron

It was re-established at RNAS Lee-on-Solent (HMS Daedalus) on 1 February 1944, as a Torpedo Bomber Reconnaissance (TBR) unit equipped with twelve Fairey Barracuda Mk II torpedo bomber aircraft. At the end of that month, it relocated to RNAS Fearn (HMS Owl) in the Scottish Highlands for training purposes. In June 1944, it was assigned to the 2nd Naval TBR Wing at RNAS Machrihanish (HMS Landrail) in Argyll and Bute. In August 1944, the unit spent six days aboard the Illustrious-class aircraft carrier, HMS Formidable, before transferring to the name ship of her class, HMS Implacable, via RNAS Grimsetter (HMS Robin) in Mainland, Orkney, and RNAS Machrihanish at the end of the month.

In October 1944, anti-submarine and anti-shipping operations were conducted off the coast of Norway, which subsequently led to the disbandment of the unit into 828 Naval Air Squadron at RNAS Hatston (HMS Sparrowhawk), Mainland, Orkney, on 28 November 1944.

== Aircraft operated ==
The squadron has operated a number of different aircraft types, including:

- Fairey Albacore torpedo bomber (July 1942 - November 1943)
- Fairey Swordfish I torpedo bomber (January - April 1943)
- Fairey Swordfish II torpedo bomber (January - April 1943)
- Fairey Barracuda Mk II torpedo and dive bomber (February - November 1944)

== Battle honours ==
The Battle Honours awarded to 841 Naval Air Squadron are:

- English Channel 1943
- Norway 1944

== Assignments ==
841 Naval Air Squadron was assigned as needed to form part of a larger unit:

- 2nd Naval TBR Wing (24 January - 28 November 1944)

== Naval air stations ==
841 Naval Air Squadron operated mostly from a number of naval air stations of the Royal Navy and Royal Air Force stations in the UK and a couple of Royal Navy fleet carriers:

1942 - 1943

- Royal Naval Air Station Lee-on-Solent (HMS Daedalus), Hampshire, (1 - 25 July 1942)
- Royal Naval Air Station Machrihanish (HMS Landrail), Argyll and Bute, (25 July - 6 August 1942)
- Royal Naval Air Station Lee-on-Solent (HMS Daedalus), Hampshire, (6 - 17 August 1942)
- Royal Air Force Middle Wallop, Hampshire, (17 - 23 August 1942)
- Royal Air Force Manston, Kent, (23 August - 1 December 1942)
  - Royal Air Force Coltishall, Norfolk, (Detachment three aircraft 7 February - 23 June 1943)
  - Royal Air Force Tangmere, Sussex, (Detachment four aircraft 31 May - 7 October 1943)
  - Royal Air Force Exeter, Devon, (Detachment three aircraft 9 July -5 October, 18 October - 25 November 1943)
- disbanded - (1 December 1943)

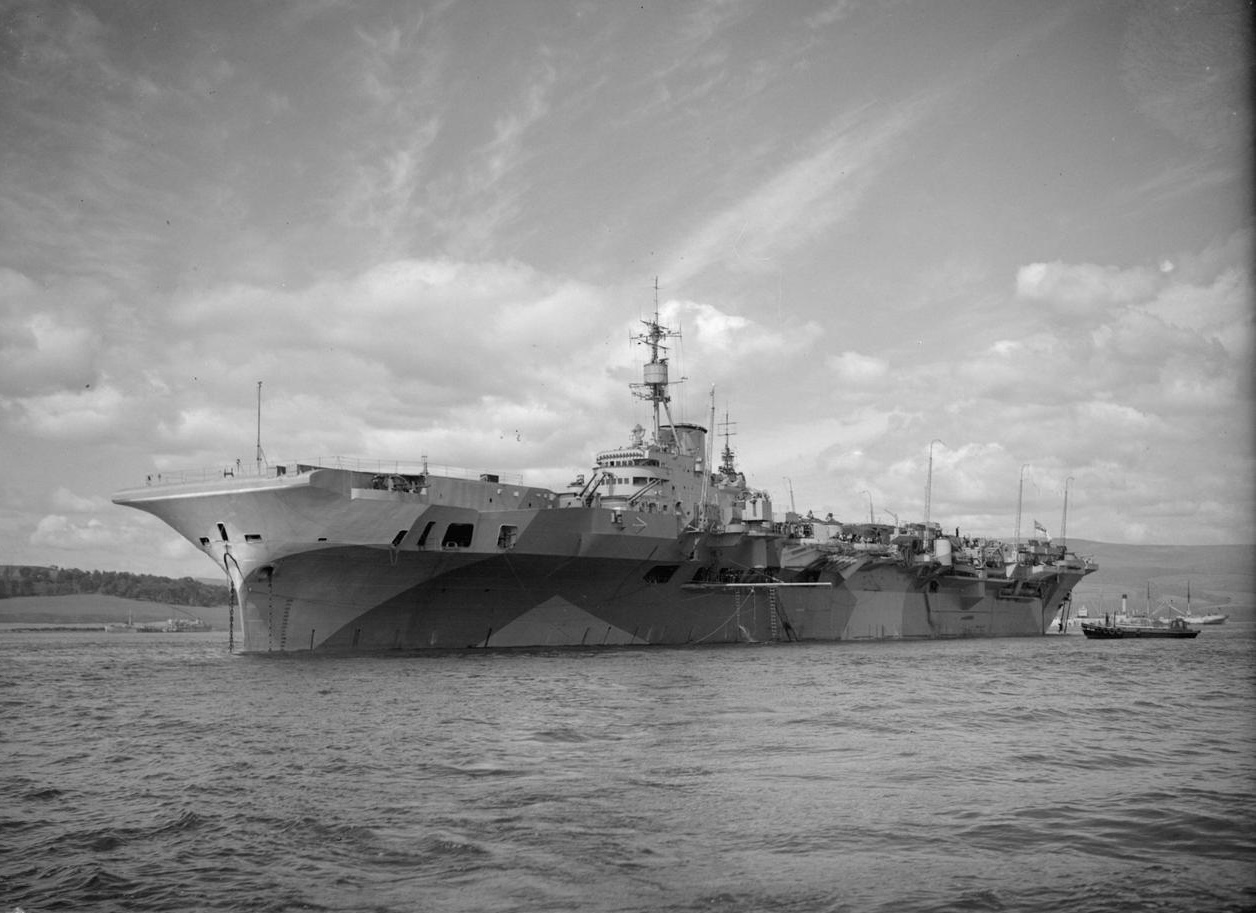
HMS Implacable

1944

- Royal Naval Air Station Lee-on-Solent (HMS Daedalus), Hampshire, (1 - 28 February 19.44)
- Royal Naval Air Station Arbroath (HMS Condor), Angus, (transit) (28 - 29 February 1944)
- Royal Naval Air Station Fearn (HMS Owl), Scottish Highlands (29 February - 28 June 1944)
- Royal Naval Air Station Machrihanish (HMS Landrail), Argyll and Bute, (28 June - 8 August 1944)
  - HMS Rajah (Detachment Deck Landing Training (DLT) 2 August 1944)
- HMS Formidable (8 - 14 August 1944)
- Royal Naval Air Station Grimsetter (HMS Robin), Mainland, Orkney, (14 - 20 August 1944)
- Royal Naval Air Station Machrihanish (HMS Landrail), Argyll and Bute, (20 - 30 August 1944)
- HMS Implacable (30 - 31 August 1944)
- Royal Naval Air Station Machrihanish (HMS Landrail), Argyll and Bute, (31 August - 22 September 1944)
- HMS Implacable (22 September - 31 October 1944)
  - Royal Naval Air Station Skeabrae, Mainland, Orkney, (Detachment four aircraft 15 - 16 October 1944)
  - Royal Naval Air Station Skeabrae, Mainland, Orkney, (Detachment four aircraft 21 - 22 October 1944)
- Royal Naval Air Station Hatston (HMS Sparrowhawk), Mainland, Orkney, (31 October - 28 November 1944)
  - Royal Naval Air Station Skeabrae, Mainland, Orkney, (Detachment four aircraft 3 - 4 November, 7 - 8 November 1944)
- disbanded - (28 November 1944)

== Commanding officers ==
List of commanding officers of 841 Naval Air Squadron with date of appointment:

1942 - 1943

- Lieutenant R.L. Williamson, DSC, RN, from 1 July 1942 (KiA 12 October 1942)
- Lieutenant(A) L.J. Kiggell, DSC & Bar, RN, from 15 October 1942
- Lieutenant Commander(A) W.F.C. Garthwaite, DSC, RNVR, from 28 December 1942
- Lieutenant Commander(A) S.M.P. Walsh, DSC, RNVR, from 2 July 1943
- disbanded - 1 December 1943

1944

- Lieutenant Commander(A) R.J. Fisher, RNZNVR, from 1 February 1944
- Lieutenant Commander(A) E.F.L. Montgomery, RNZNVR, from 1 June 1944
- Lieutenant(A) R.W. Elliott, DSC, RNVR, from 18 October 1944
- disbanded - 28 November 1944

Note: Abbreviation (A) signifies Air Branch of the RN or RNVR.
