= 2nd Naval TBR Wing =

Royal Navy Fleet Air Arm aircraft wing

- White Ensign
- Active: January 1944 – January 1945
- Country: United Kingdom
- Branch: Royal Navy
- Type: Naval TBR Wing
- Role: Carrier-based Torpedo, bomber and reconnaissance
- Size: Two squadrons
- Part of: Fleet Air Arm
- Aircraft carrier: HMS Implacable
- Engagements: World War II: European theatre of World War II; Operation Goodwood; Operation Athletic; Operation Provident; Indian Ocean in World War II; Operation Meridian

Commanders
- Notable commanders: Lieutenant Commander E. M. Britton, RN

Aircraft flown
- Bomber: Fairey Barracuda; Grumman Avenger

2nd Naval TBR Wing ("2 Wing") was a Fleet Air Arm torpedo bomber reconnaissance formation of the Royal Navy which formed on 24 January 1944. It initially comprised 828 and 841 Naval Air Squadrons, both equipped with Fairey Barracuda torpedo and dive bomber aircraft and was allocated to HMS Implacable. The first formation ended on 28 November 1944 when 841 Squadron was absorbed into 828 Squadron.

The wing was reformed at RNAS Katukurunda, Ceylon on 10 December 1944 as No. 2 Strike Wing, with 820 and 849 Naval Air Squadrons, equipped with Grumman Avenger torpedo bombers. The two squadrons subsequently embarked in different carriers during January 1945, effectively ending the wing as a combined formation.

== History ==
=== Formation ===
Naval air wings were established during the Second World War to bring together Fleet Air Arm squadrons allocated to particular aircraft carriers. The 2nd Naval TBR Wing was formed at RNAS Lee-on-Solent, Hampshire, early in 1944 and allocated to the name ship of her class HMS Implacable.

The wing was formed on 24 January 1944 under Lieutenant Commander E.M. Britton, RN, and comprised 828 and 841 Naval Air Squadrons, both equipped with Fairey Barracuda Mk II torpedo and dive bomber aircraft. It was allocated to HMS Implacable.

828 Naval Air Squadron re-formed at RNAS Lee-on-Solent in March 1944 and subsequently trained with its Fairey Barracudas at RNAS Fearn, Scottish Highlands. 841 Naval Air Squadron was re-established at RNAS Lee-on-Solent in February and moved to RNAS Fearn for training before joining the wing at RNAS Machrihanish, Argyll and Bute.

=== Operation Goodwood ===
In August 1944, elements of the wing temporarily operated from the Illustrious-class aircraft carrier HMS Formidable. 828 Naval Air Squadron transferred to the aircraft carrier and took part in Operation Goodwood, the series of Fleet Air Arm attacks against the Tirpitz at her anchorage in Kaafjord. 841 Naval Air Squadron also spent six days aboard HMS Formidable before transferring to back to HMS Implacable.

Following the Goodwood operations, the Wing transferred to HMS Implacable. 841 Squadron passed through RNAS Grimsetter, Mainland, Orkney and RNAS Machrihanish, Argyll and Bute, during the movement, while 828 Squadron operated briefly from RNAS Donibristle, Fife, before returning to the aircraft carrier.

=== Operations Athletic and Provident ===
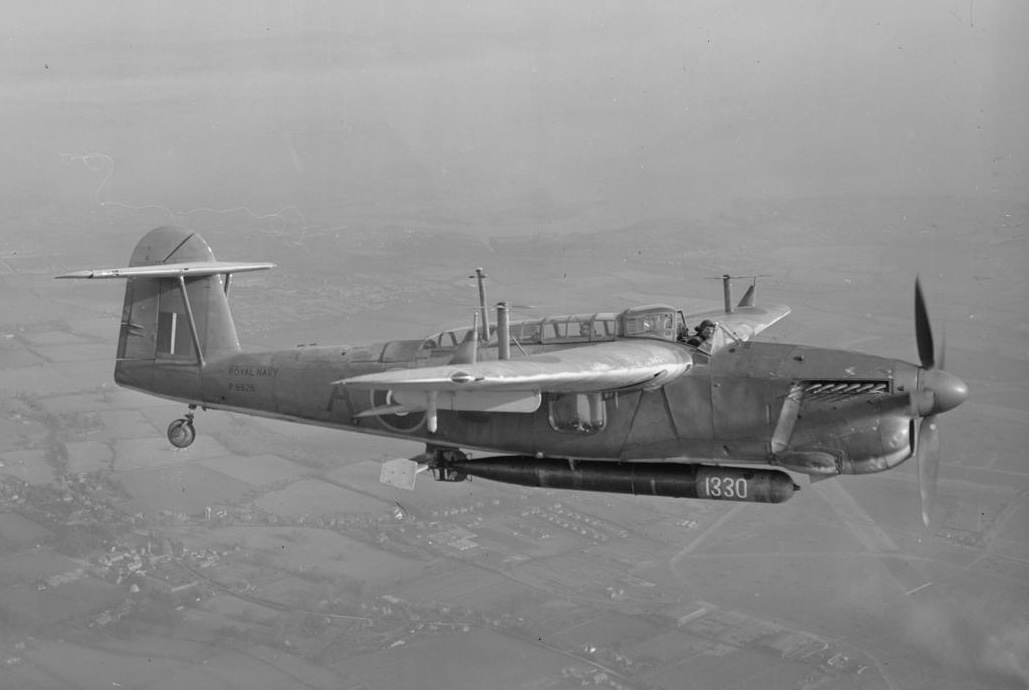
Fairey Barracuda Mk II

Following its return to HMS Implacable, the wing took part in operations against German shipping and coastal positions off Norway. On 24 October 1944, HMS Implacable operated as part of the Home Fleet during Operation Athletic. The 2nd Naval TBR Wing conducted attacks against shipping off the Norwegian coast. This operation formed part of a series of Home Fleet operations intended to attack German shipping and facilities in northern Norway.

HMS Implacable subsequently took part in Operation Provident. On 27 November 1944 the aircraft carrier operated against German shipping and other targets off northern Norway and aircraft from HMS Implacable attacked a convoy near Namsos.

Following these operations the 2nd Naval TBR Wing effectively ceased to exist as a formation. 841 Squadron had left the aircraft carrier at the end of October for RNAS Hatston, Mainland, Orkney and was subsequently absorbed by 828 Squadron on 28 November.

=== No. 2 Strike Wing ===
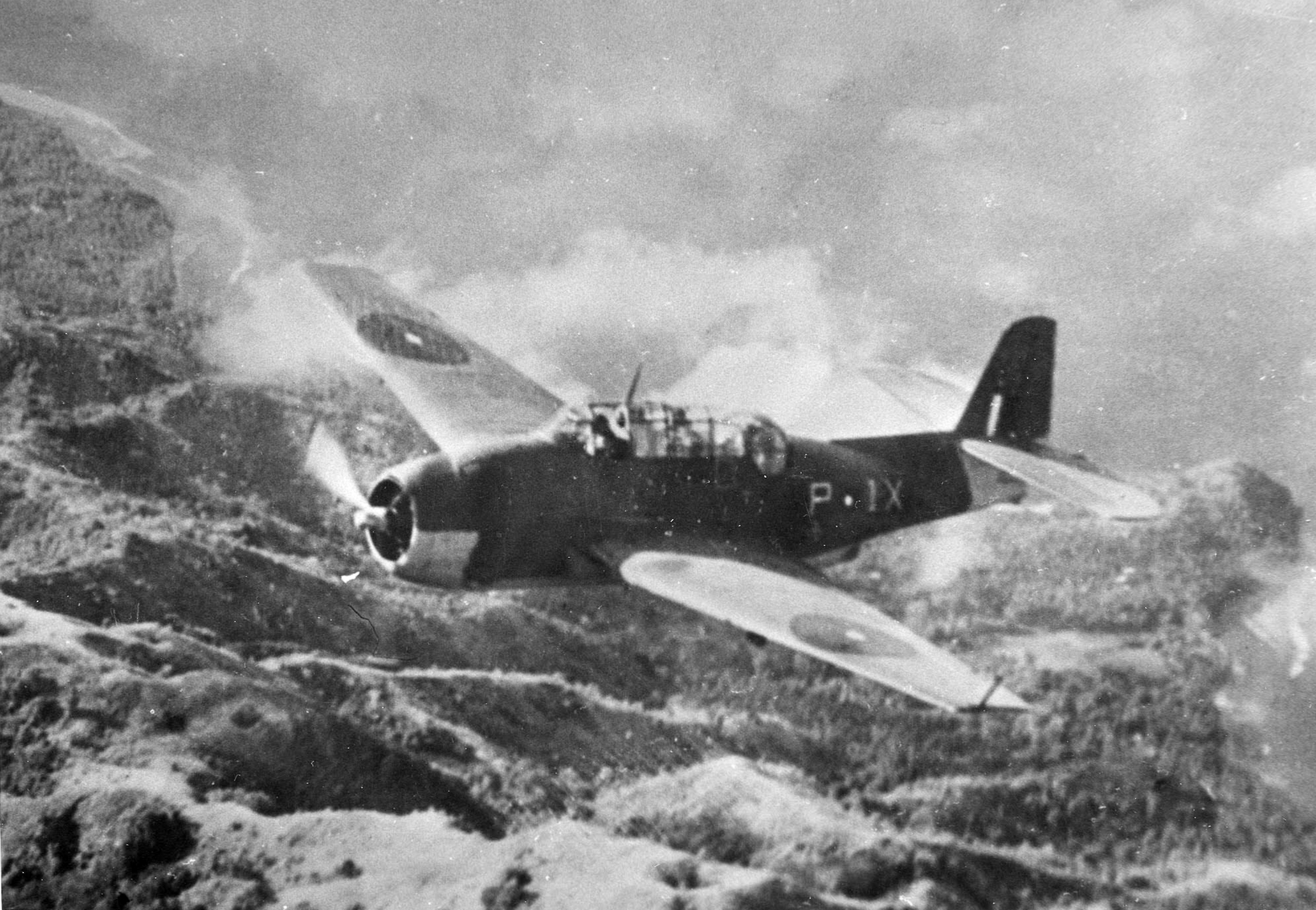
Grumman Avenger Mk.II from 849 Naval Air Squadron based on HMS Victorious, over an island in the Indian Ocean, ca. 1944.

The wing was reformed at RNAS Katukurunda in Ceylon on 10 December 1944 and designated No. 2 Strike Wing. It comprised 820 and 849 Naval Air Squadrons, both equipped with Grumman Avenger Mk.IIs, an American torpedo bomber.

820 Naval Air Squadron had re-equipped with Grumman Avenger aircraft in September 1944 and embarked in the Implacable-class aircraft carrier HMS Indefatigable on 21 November for passage to Ceylon. 849 Naval Air Squadron operated with Illustrious-class aircraft carrier HMS Victorious. Both squadrons became components of the reformed No. 2 Strike Wing at RNAS Katukurunda.

The reformed wing was therefore not a single embarked carrier air group. 820 and 849 Naval Air Squadrons were associated with different aircraft carriers and embarked separately during January 1945, effectively ending the wing as a combined formation.

The two squadrons subsequently participated in operations in the Far East, including the January 1945 attacks on Japanese oil installations at Pangkalan Brandon, Operation Lentil and Palembang during Operation Meridian as part of the British Pacific Fleet and during May Operation Iceberg.

== Squadrons ==
2nd Naval TBR Wing consisted of four Fleet Air Arm torpedo bomber reconnaissance squadrons during its existence:

- 828 Naval Air Squadron, (1944)
- 841 Naval Air Squadron, (1944)
- 820 Naval Air Squadron, (1944 - 1945)
- 849 Naval Air Squadron, (1944 - 1945)

== Naval air stations and carrier deployments ==
The components of the wing operated from a number of Royal Navy naval air stations during their periods of formation, training and deployment, and the squadrons were occasionally deployed independently before embarking in their assigned carriers.

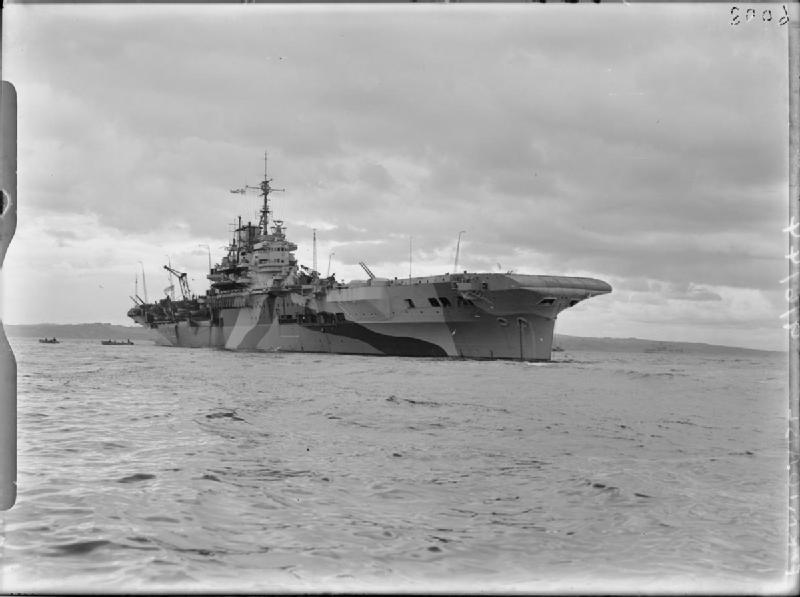
HMS Formidable

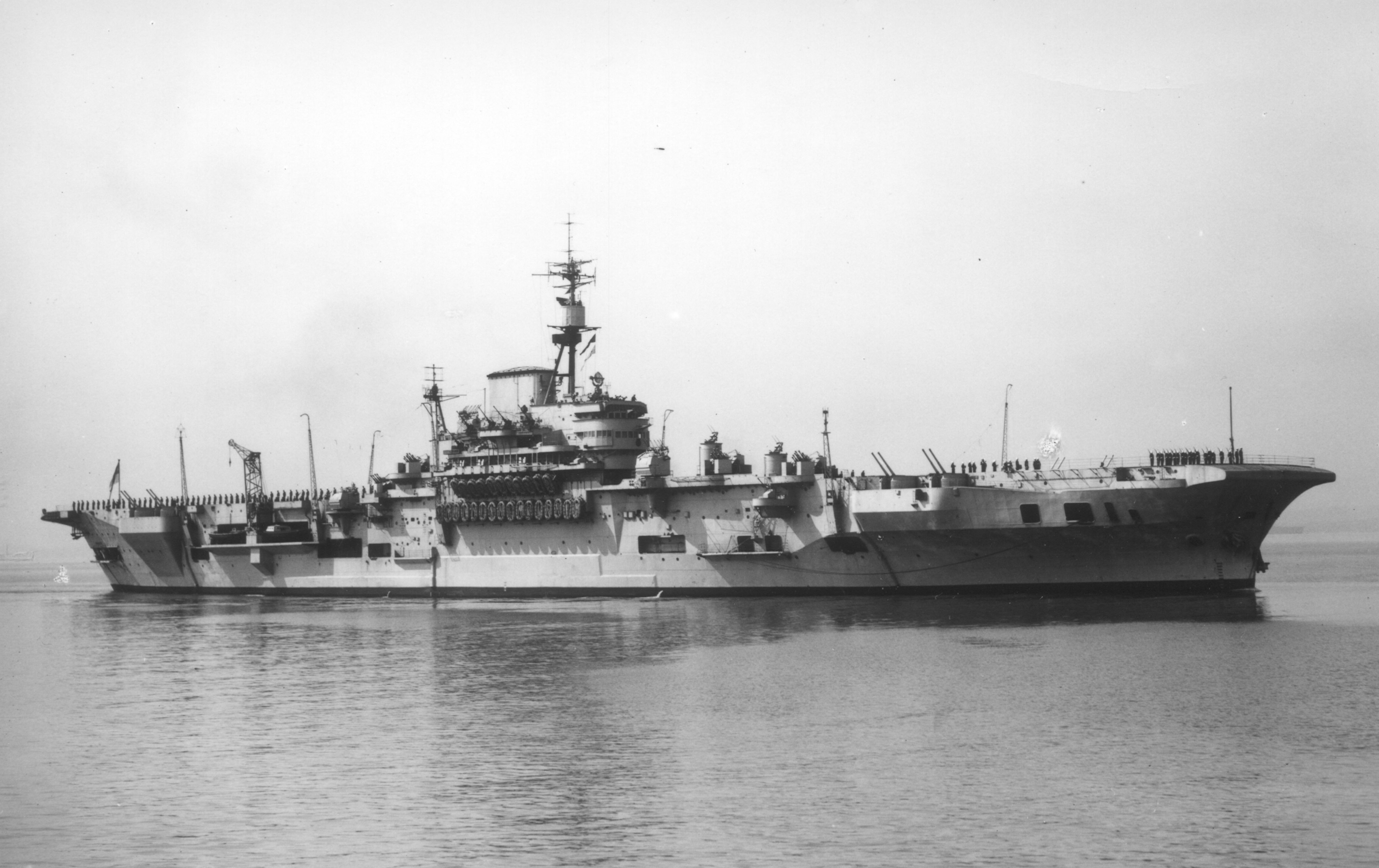
HMS Implacable

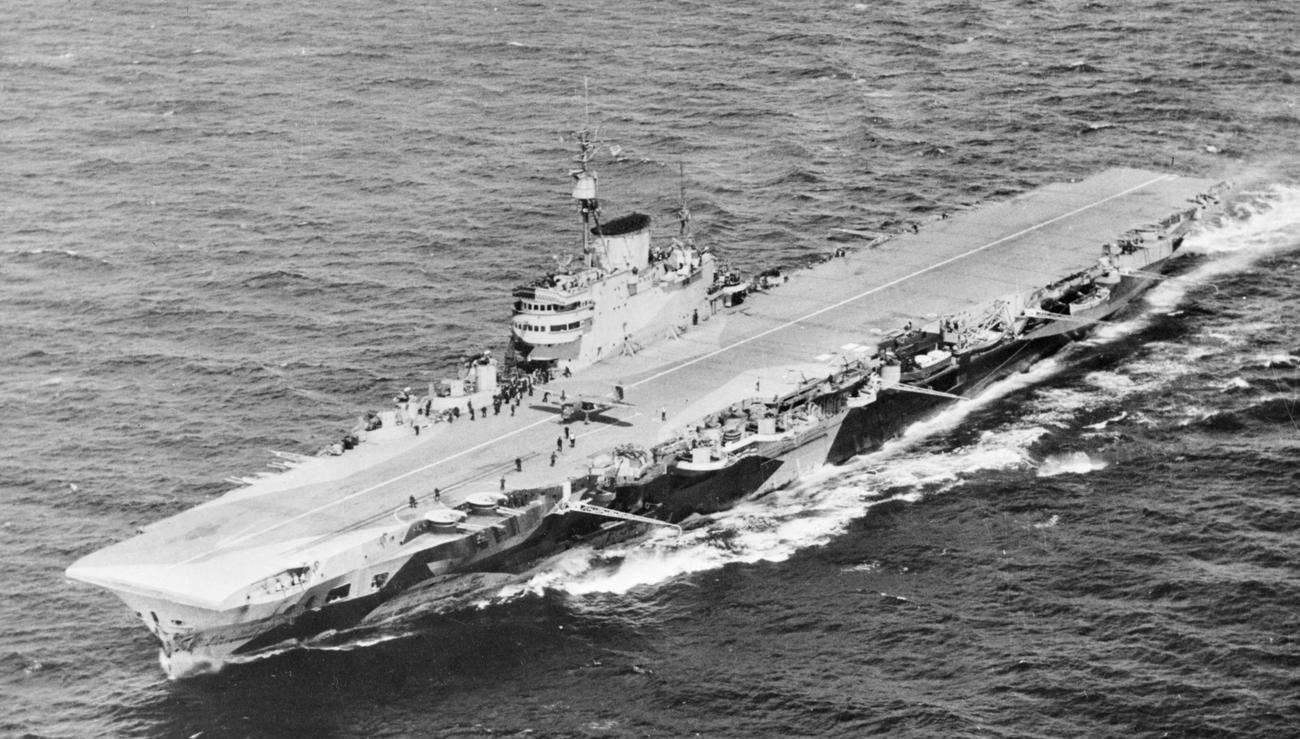
HMS Indefatigable

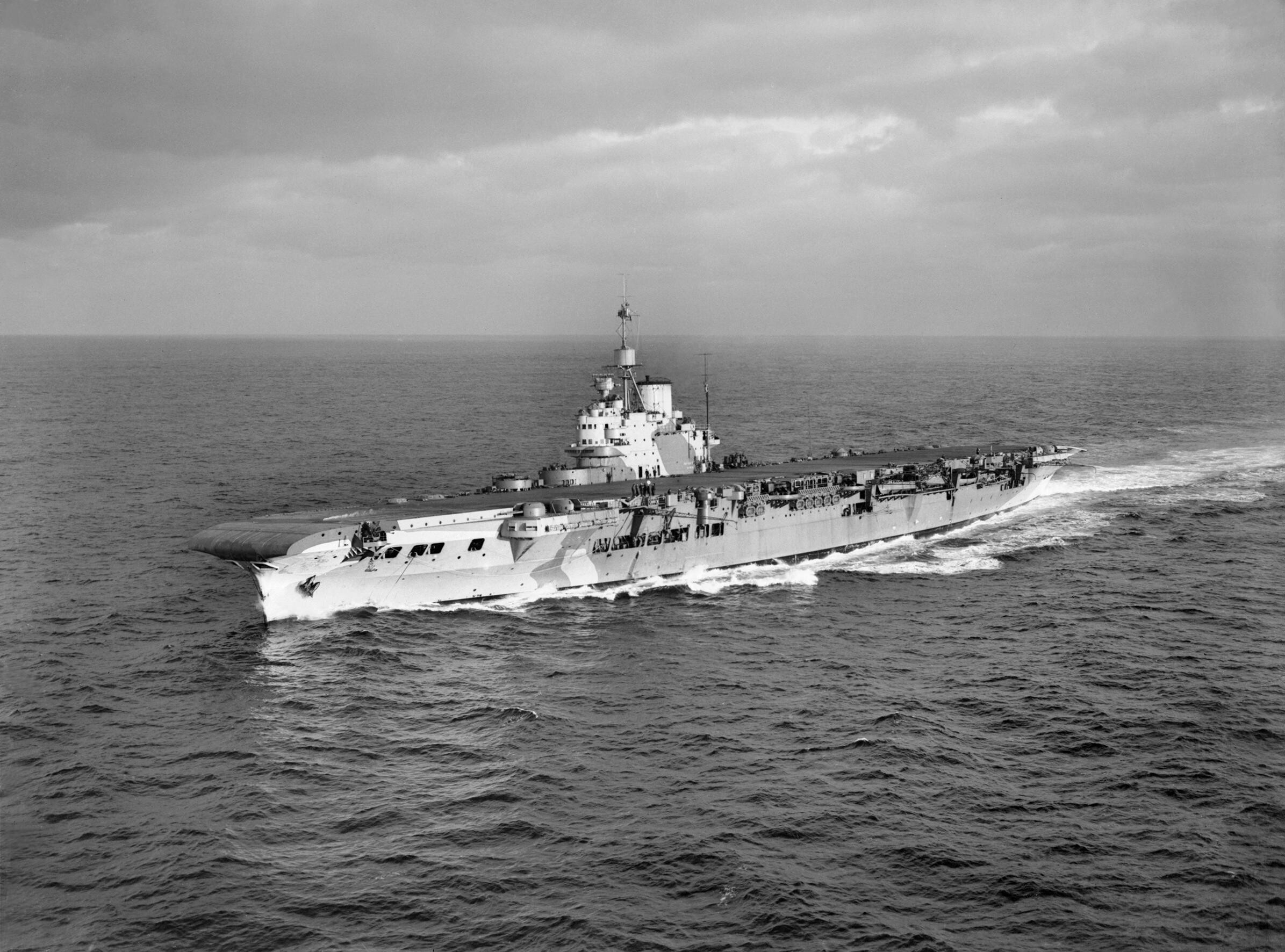
HMS Victorious

- Royal Naval Air Station Lee-on-Solent (HMS Daedalus), Hampshire.
  - The 2nd Naval TBR Wing was formed here on 24 January 1944 and allocated to HMS Implacable.
  - 828 Naval Air Squadron — formation and initial training, January–March 1944.
  - 841 Naval Air Squadron — re-formed here in February 1944 before moving to RNAS Fearn for training.
- Royal Naval Air Station Fearn (HMS Owl), Ross-shire.
  - Used for Fairey Barracuda training by the two squadrons before their concentration for carrier operations.
  - 828 Naval Air Squadron — February–March 1944.
  - 841 Naval Air Squadron — February–June 1944.
- Royal Naval Air Station Machrihanish (HMS Landrail), Argyll and Bute
  - Used during the wing's preparation for embarkation in HMS Implacable.
  - 841 Naval Air Squadron — joined the wing at RNAS Machrihanish in June 1944 and returned there during its subsequent movement to HMS Implacable.
- HMS Formidable
  - Elements of the wing temporarily operated from the carrier in August 1944.
  - 828 Naval Air Squadron — embarked for Operation Goodwood and took part in the attacks on the Tirpitz.
  - 841 Naval Air Squadron — embarked for six days before transferring to HMS Implacable.
- Royal Naval Air Station Grimsetter (HMS Robin), Mainland, Orkney.
  - Used by 841 Naval Air Squadron during its transfer to HMS Implacable in August 1944.
  - 841 Naval Air Squadron — August 1944.
- Royal Naval Air Station Hatston (HMS Sparrowhawk), Mainland, Orkney
  - Used during the transition from the first wing to its dissolution.
  - 828 Naval Air Squadron — temporarily operated from RNAS Hatston during August 1944.
  - 841 Naval Air Squadron — absorbed into 828 Naval Air Squadron at RNAS Hatston on 28 November 1944, ending the first incarnation of the wing.
- HMS Implacable
  - Embarked 828 and 841 Naval Air Squadrons in August 1944. The Fairey Barracudas subsequently operated with the carrier during Home Fleet operations off Norway, including anti-shipping operations in October and November.
- Royal Naval Air Station Katukurunda (HMS Ukussa), Ceylon.
  - The wing was reformed here on 10 December 1944 as No. 2 Strike Wing.
  - 820 Naval Air Squadron — joined the reformed wing after arriving in Ceylon aboard HMS Indefatigable.
  - 849 Naval Air Squadron — joined the reformed wing while operating with HMS Victorious.
- HMS Indefatigable
  - 820 Naval Air Squadron embarked on 21 November 1944 for passage to Ceylon and subsequently formed part of No. 2 Strike Wing.
- HMS Victorious
  - 849 Naval Air Squadron operated with the reformed No. 2 Strike Wing.
- Royal Naval Air Station Colombo Racecourse (HMS Berhunda), Ceylon.
  - Used during the Far Eastern deployment of the squadrons following the reformation of No. 2 Strike Wing.
- Royal Naval Air Station Puttalam (HMS Rajaliya), Ceylon.
  - Used during the preparation of the Grumman Avenger squadrons for operations with the British Pacific Fleet.

== Aircraft ==
The wing's four constituent squadrons operated with two types of torpedo bomber aircraft:

- Fairey Barracuda Mk II torpedo and dive bomber (1944)
- Grumman Avenger Mk.II torpedo bomber (1944 - 1945)

== Wing leader ==
- Lieutenant Commander E.M. Britton, RN, from 24 January 1944. Britton was appointed to command the 2nd Naval TBR Wing when it was formed at RNAS Lee-on-Solent in January 1944. He remained associated with the wing through its first incarnation with 828 and 841 Naval Air Squadrons until its disbandment on 28 November 1944.

== See also ==
- Fleet Air Arm
- List of aircraft wings of the Royal Navy
- 820 Naval Air Squadron
- 828 Naval Air Squadron
- 841 Naval Air Squadron
- 849 Naval Air Squadron
- HMS Implacable
- Home Fleet
- British Pacific Fleet
