= HMS Implacable (R86) =

1944 Implacable-class aircraft carrier of the Royal Navy

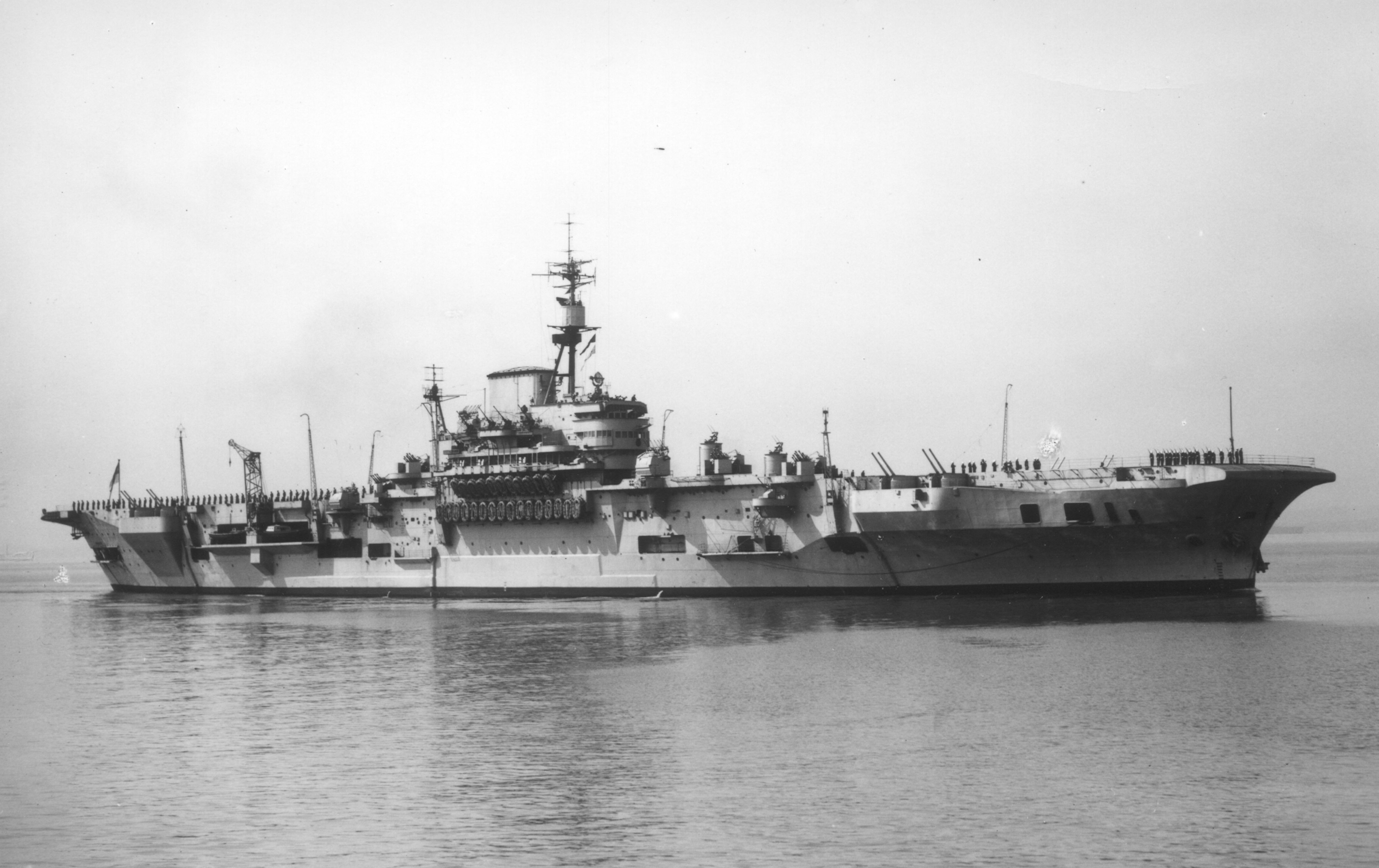
- Profile view of Implacable at anchor

History

United Kingdom
- Name: Implacable
- Ordered: October 1938
- Builder: Fairfield Shipbuilding, Govan
- Laid down: 21 February 1939
- Launched: 10 December 1942
- Commissioned: 28 August 1944
- Decommissioned: 1 September 1954
- Identification: Pennant number: 86
- Honours and awards: Norway 1944; Japan 1945
- Fate: Sold for scrap, 27 October 1955

General characteristics
- Class & type: Implacable-class aircraft carrier
- Displacement: 32,110 long tons (32,630 t) (deep load)
- Length: 766 ft 6 in (233.6 m) (o/a); 730 ft (222.5 m) (waterline)
- Beam: 95 ft 9 in (29.2 m)
- Draught: 29 ft 4 in (8.9 m) (deep load)
- Installed power: 8 Admiralty 3-drum boilers; 148,000 shp (110,000 kW)
- Propulsion: 4 shafts; 4 geared steam turbines
- Speed: 32.5 knots (60.2 km/h; 37.4 mph)
- Range: 6,720 nmi (12,450 km; 7,730 mi) at 20 knots (37 km/h; 23 mph)
- Complement: 2,300 (1945)
- Sensors & processing systems: 1 × Type 277 height-finding radar; 1 × Type 279 early-warning radar; 1 × Type 281 early-warning radar; 6 × Type 282 gunnery radars; 4 × Type 285 gunnery radars
- Armament: 8 × twin QF 4.5-inch dual-purpose guns; 5 × octuple, 1 × quadruple QF 2-pdr anti-aircraft guns; 21 × twin, 19 × single Oerlikon 20 mm anti-aircraft guns
- Armour: Waterline belt: 4.5 in (114 mm); Flight deck: 3 in (76 mm); Bulkheads: 2 in (51 mm); Hangar sides: 2 in (51 mm); Magazines: 3–4.5 in (76–114 mm)
- Aircraft carried: 81
- Aviation facilities: 1 catapult

HMS Implacable was the name ship of her class of two aircraft carriers built for the Royal Navy during World War II. Upon completion in 1944, she was initially assigned to the Home Fleet and attacked targets in Norway for the rest of the year. She was subsequently assigned to the British Pacific Fleet (BPF) where she attacked the Japanese naval base at Truk and targets in the Japanese Home Islands in 1945. The ship was used to repatriate liberated Allied prisoners of war (PoWs) and soldiers after the Japanese surrender, for the rest of the year. Implacable returned home in 1946 and became the Home Fleet's deck-landing training carrier, a role that lasted until 1950. She briefly served as flagship of the Home Fleet in 1950. During this time she participated in many exercises and made a number of port visits in Western Europe. She was placed in reserve in 1950 and converted into a training ship in 1952, and served as flagship of the Home Fleet Training Squadron. The ship was considered for a major modernisation in 1951–1952, but this was rejected as too expensive and time-consuming. Implacable was decommissioned in 1954 and sold for scrap the following year.

== Design and description ==
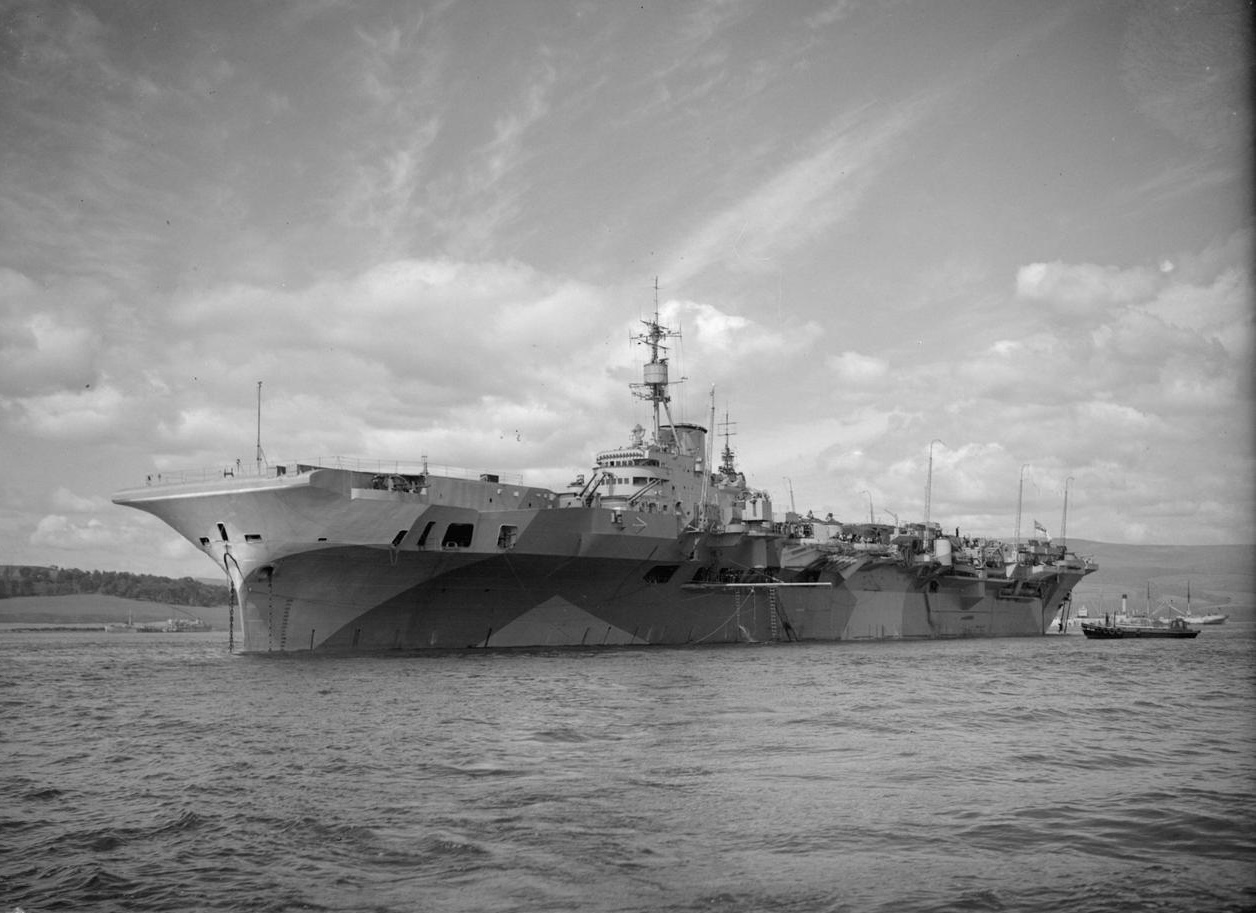
Implacable at anchor at Greenock in camouflage, 14 June 1944

The Implacable class had its origin as an improved version of the Illustrious-class aircraft carriers for the 1938 Naval Programme. They were designed to be 2 knots (3.7 km/h; 2.3 mph) faster, and to carry an additional dozen aircraft at the expense of reduced armour protection to remain within the 23,000 long tons (23,000 t) available from the tonnage allowed by the Washington Naval Treaty. Implacable was 766 feet 6 inches (233.6 m) long overall and 730 feet (222.5 m) at the waterline. Her beam was 95 feet 9 inches (29.2 m) at the waterline and she had a draught of 29 feet 4 inches (8.9 m) at deep load. The Implacable-class ships were significantly overweight and displaced 32,110 long tons (32,630 t) at deep load. The ships had metacentric heights of 4.06 ft (1.2 m) at light load and 6.91 ft (2.1 m) at deep load as completed. Implacable's complement was approximately 2,300 officers and ratings in 1945.

The ships were equipped with four Parsons geared steam turbines, each driving one shaft using steam supplied by eight Admiralty 3-drum boilers. The turbines were designed to produce a total of 148,000 shaft horsepower (110,000 kW), enough to give them a maximum speed of 32.5 knots (60.2 km/h; 37.4 mph). On sea trials, Implacable reached speeds of 31.89 knots (59.06 km/h; 36.70 mph) with 151,200 shp (112,700 kW). She carried a maximum of 4,690 long tons (4,770 t) of fuel oil which gave her a range of 6,720 nautical miles (12,450 km; 7,730 mi) at 20 knots (37 km/h; 23 mph).

The 760-foot (231.6 m) armoured flight deck had a maximum width of 102 feet (31.1 m). A single hydraulic aircraft catapult was fitted on the forward part of the flight deck. The Implacable-class carriers were equipped with two lifts on the centreline, the forward of which measured 45 by 33 feet (13.7 by 10.1 m) and served only the upper hangar, and the aft lift (45 by 22 feet (13.7 by 6.7 m)) which served both hangars. The upper hangar was 458 feet (139.6 m) long and the lower hangar was 208 feet (63.4 m) long; both had a maximum width of 62 feet (18.9 m). Both hangars had a height of only 14 feet which precluded storage of Lend-Lease Vought F4U Corsair fighters as well as many post-war aircraft and helicopters. Designed to stow 48 aircraft in their hangars, the use of a permanent deck park allowed the Implacable class to accommodate up to 81 aircraft. The additional crewmen, maintenance personnel and facilities needed to support these aircraft were housed in the lower hangar. The ships were provided with 94,650 imperial gallons (430,300 L; 113,670 US gal) of petrol.

=== Armament, electronics and protection ===
The ship's main armament consisted of sixteen quick-firing (QF) 4.5-inch (110 mm) dual-purpose guns in eight twin-gun turrets, four in sponsons on each side of the hull. Unlike the Illustrious-class ships, the roofs of the gun turrets were flat and flush with the flight deck. The gun had a maximum range of 20,760 yards (18,980 m). Her light anti-aircraft defences included five octuple mounts for QF 2-pounder ("pom-pom") anti-aircraft (AA) guns, two on the flight deck forward of the island, one on the aft part of the island and two in sponsons on the port side of the hull. A single quadruple 2-pounder mount was also fitted on the port side of the hull. The 2-pounder gun had a maximum range of 6,800 yards (6,200 m). The ship was also fitted with 61 Oerlikon 20 mm autocannon in 19 single and 21 twin-gun mounts. These guns had a maximum range of 4,800 yards (4,400 m), but some were replaced by 40 mm Bofors AA guns when the ships were transferred to the Pacific Theater as the 20 mm shell was unlikely to destroy a kamikaze before it hit the ship. The Bofors gun had a maximum range of 10,750 yards (9,830 m). Two additional quadruple "pom-pom" mounts were added to Implacable before she joined the British Pacific Fleet in 1945. By the end of the war, she had 4 single Bofors guns, plus 17 twin and 17 single Oerlikon mounts. By April 1946 these had been reduced to 12 Bofors guns, 8 twin and 14 single Oerlikon guns.

They were fitted with the Type 277 surface-search/height-finding radar on top of the bridge and a Type 293 target indicator radar on the foremast. The ships probably carried Type 279 and Type 281B early-warning radars, based on the radars fitted aboard the Illustrious-class carrier Victorious late in the war. In addition, Type 282 and Type 285 gunnery radars were mounted on the fire-control directors.

The Implacable-class ships had a flight deck protected by 3 in (76 mm) of armour. The sides of the hangars were either 1.5 in (38 mm) or 2 in (51 mm). The ends of the hangars were protected by 2-inch bulkheads and the armour of the hangar deck ranged from 1.5 to 2.5 inches (38 to 64 mm) in thickness. The waterline armour belt was 4.5 inches (114 mm) thick, but only covered the central portion of the ship. The belt was closed by 1.5 to 2-inch transverse bulkheads fore and aft. The underwater defence system was a layered system of liquid- and air-filled compartments as used in the Illustrious class. The magazines for the 4.5-inch guns lay outside the armoured citadel and were protected by 2 to 3-inch roofs, 4.5-inch sides and 1.5 to 2-inch ends.

== Construction and service ==
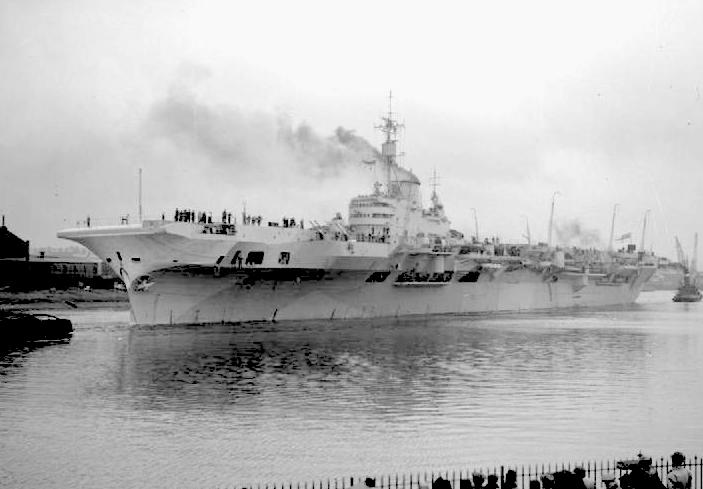
Implacable being towed down the Clyde, 1944

Implacable was laid down by Fairfield Shipbuilding and Engineering Co. at their shipyard in Clydeside on 21 February 1939, as Yard Number 672. Her construction was temporarily suspended in 1940–41, in favour of higher-priority ships needed to fight in the Battle of the Atlantic, before she was launched on 10 December 1942 by Queen Elizabeth. Captain Lachlan Mackintosh was appointed to command the ship in November 1943. She was commissioned on 22 May 1944, and began sea trials which revealed a significant number of problems that required rectification, so the ship was not formally completed until 28 August. Implacable was assigned to the Home Fleet and was working up over the next several months while the Fairey Fireflies of 1771 Squadron flew aboard on 10 September. The squadron was followed by the Fairey Barracuda torpedo bombers of 828 and 841 Squadrons that made up 2nd Naval TBR Wing later that month.

Her first mission was to locate the German battleship Tirpitz which had left its anchorage in Kaafjord in early October. Implacable departed Scapa Flow on 16 October, and a section of her Fireflies spotted the battleship off Håkøya Island near Tromsø two days later. No attack was mounted because the carrier lacked any single-seat fighters aboard to escort the strike aircraft, although they did damage a cargo ship before returning home. On 16 October, the Supermarine Seafires of 887 and 894 Squadrons of 24th Naval Fighter Wing landed aboard. In late October she participated in Operation Athletic off the Norwegian coast, where her aircraft sank six ships and damaged a German submarine for the loss of one Barracuda, while conducting the Royal Navy's last wartime torpedo attack. On 1 November Captain Charles Hughes-Hallett relieved Mackintosh and assumed command of the ship.

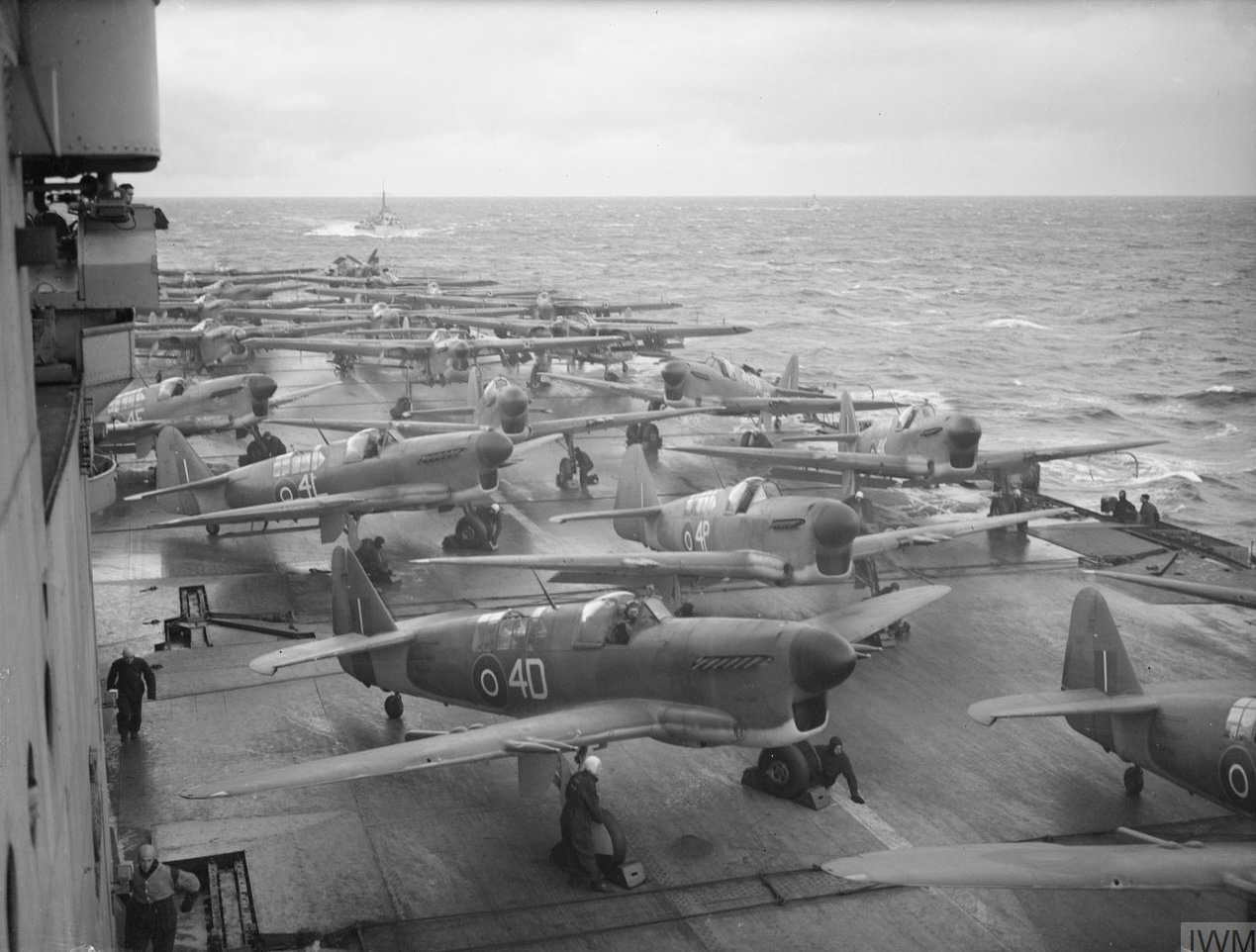
Fireflies on 26 November 1944, warming up for an attack on Norwegian targets

The Barracudas were replaced by the Seafires of 30th Naval Fighter Wing, which consisted of 801 and 880 Squadrons, on 8 November and the Seafires provided air cover for minelaying operations by escort carriers from 11 to 21 November. The next day, Admiral Sir Henry Ruthven Moore, Commander-in-Chief of the Home Fleet, hoisted his flag in Implacable and the ship set sail to hunt for a convoy that had been reported near Alsten Island (Operation Provident) with the Seafires and Fireflies of 801, 880, and 1771 Squadrons aboard. Bad weather prevented aircraft from being launched until 27 November, but they located the convoy and sank two merchantmen, including MS Rigel, and damaged six others. MS Rigel was used as a German prisoner of war (POW) transport and the sinking resulted in more than 2,500 dead, mostly POWs. Upon her return to Scapa on 29 November, Moore lowered his flag, but Vice Admiral Sir Frederick Dalrymple-Hamilton, second in command of Home Fleet, hoisted his flag on 6 December for Operation Urbane, another minelaying operation during which her Fireflies helped to sink a German minesweeper. Dalrymple-Hamilton transferred his flag off Implacable when she returned to Scapa on 9 December. On 15 December she began a refit at Rosyth preparatory to her transfer to the British Pacific Fleet, which included augmenting her light AA armament.

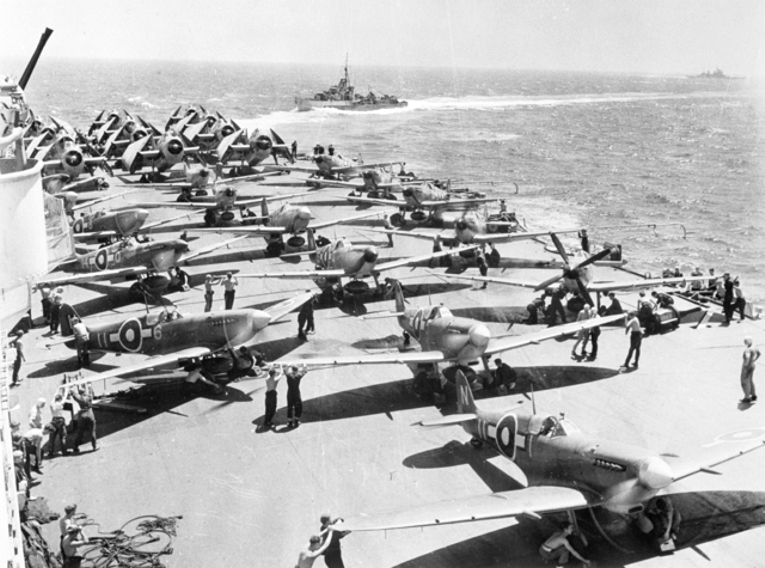
Fleet Air Arm Avengers, Seafires and Fireflies on board Implacable warm up their engines before taking off, 1945

Upon its completion on 10 March 1945, 801, 828, 880, and 1771 Squadrons reembarked with a total strength of 48 Seafires, 21 Grumman TBF Avenger torpedo bombers and a dozen Fireflies, the largest air group aboard a British carrier thus far. Implacable departed six days later to join the BPF and arrived at Port Said, Egypt, on 25 March. While passing through the Suez Canal, a strong gust of wind forced her ashore and it took her escorting tugboats five hours to pull her off. Undamaged, she proceeded on her voyage and reached Sydney on 8 May 1945 (V-E Day).

Implacable arrived at the BPF's main operating base at Manus Island, in the Admiralty Islands, on 29 May. A week later Rear Admiral Sir Patrick Brind hoisted his flag in preparation for Operation Inmate, an attack on the Japanese naval base at Truk in the Caroline Islands that began on 14 June. Having flown 113 offensive sorties over the two days of the attack, with only one loss of a Seafire to enemy action, the carrier and her escorts returned to Manus Island on 17 June. On 30 June 8th Carrier Air Group was formed, absorbing No. 24 Naval Fighter Wing, to control all of the air units aboard Implacable.

After working up, she sailed to join the main body of the BPF off the Japanese coast on 6 July, and rendezvoused with them ten days later. Implacable flew off eight Fireflies and a dozen Seafires against targets north of Tokyo on 17 July, but only the Fireflies were able to locate their targets because of bad weather. Eight Fireflies and twenty Seafires attacked targets near Tokyo the next day, before more bad weather halted flying operations until 24–25 July, when the BPF's aircraft attacked targets near Osaka and the Inland Sea, crippling the escort carrier Kaiyo. After replenishing, airstrikes resumed on 28 and 30 July, the British sinking the escort Okinawa near Maizuru. A combination of bad weather, refuelling requirements and the atomic bombing of Hiroshima delayed the resumption of air operations until 9 August. During the day, Implacable's Seafires flew 94 sorties and her Fireflies flew 14 against targets in northern Honshu and southern Hokkaido for the loss of two Seafires. The attacks were repeated the next day, sinking two warships, numerous small merchantmen and destroying numerous railroad locomotives and parked aircraft. The BPF had been scheduled to withdraw after 10 August to prepare for Operation Olympic, the invasion of Kyushu scheduled for November, and the bulk of the force, including Implacable, departed for Manus on 12 August. Her aircraft flew over 1,000 sorties since her arrival the previous month.

=== Post-war ===
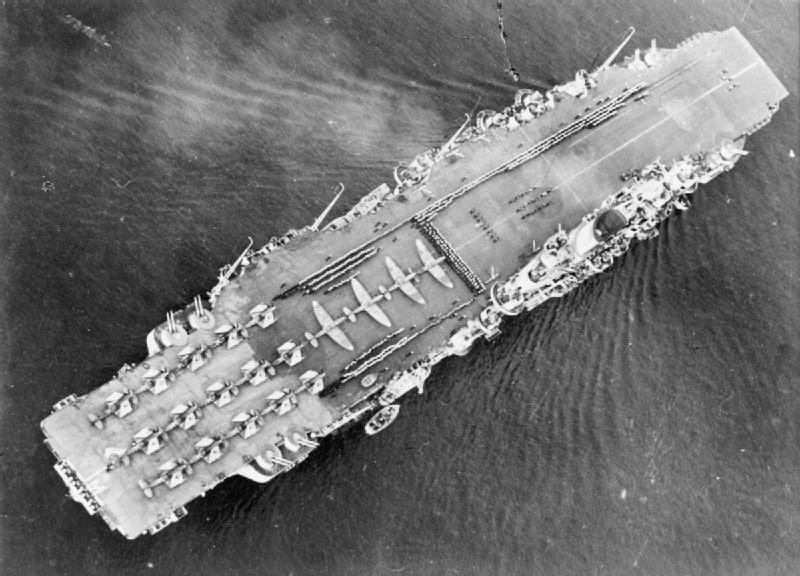
Aerial view of Implacable as she arrived at Sydney after the end of the war

She arrived at Sydney on 24 August, and had her hangars refitted to accommodate Allied PoWs and soldiers for repatriation. Having left her air group behind to maximize the numbers of passengers she could carry, the ship arrived at Manila on 25 September, where she loaded over 2,000 British, American and Canadian PoWs. She dropped off the Americans at Pearl Harbor on 5 October and continued on to deliver British and Canadian passengers at Vancouver six days later. Opened for public tours, Implacable remained for a week before sailing to Hong Kong to pick up several hundred PoWs and continued onwards to Manila to load 2,114 more passengers. She delivered them to Balikpapan, Borneo, for transhipment to Britain. In their place the carrier embarked 2,126 men of the 7th Australian Division, and their equipment, to return to Australia. She arrived at Sydney on 17 November and sailed on 8 December to load more returning troops from Papua New Guinea. Arriving back at Sydney before Christmas, the ship had her additional bunks, etc., removed to return her to operational status.

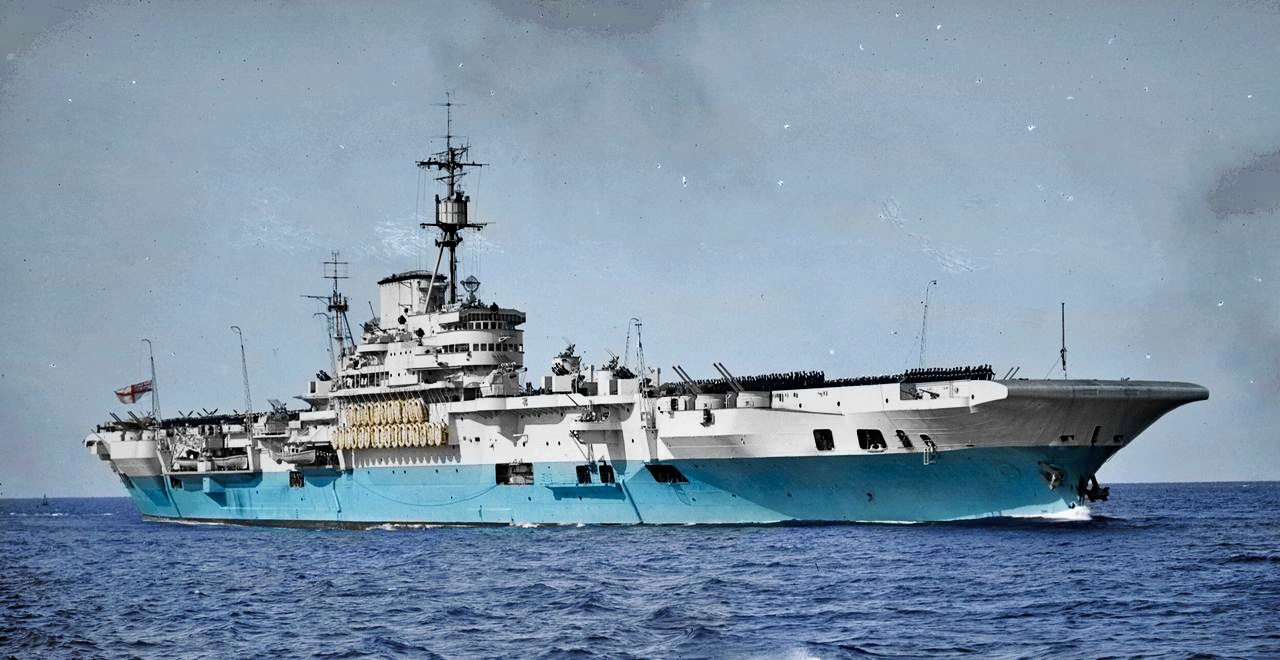
Implacable at sea in 1946

In January 1946 her air group flew aboard, minus the disbanded 880 Squadron, and with 1790 Squadron replacing 1771 Squadron. After several days of flying exercises, Implacable made a port visit to Melbourne together with her sister Indefatigable and several other ships. She became the flagship of Vice Admiral Sir Philip Vian, the newly appointed second in command of the BPF on 31 January. She continued a relaxed schedule of training and port visits until she began a refit on 15 March in Sydney, that lasted until 29 April, when she put to sea to fly on her aircraft and to dump overboard the 16 Lend-Lease Avengers belonging to 828 Squadron (Britain had to either pay for them or dispose of them with the end of the war, and lacked the means to do the former). She sailed for home on 5 May and reached Devonport on 3 June, where Vian struck his flag.

Implacable became the deck-landing training carrier for the Home Fleet when she next put to sea in August. On 25 September Captain Aubrey Mansergh assumed command of the ship. Two months later she participated in an exercise with the Home Fleet and was lightly damaged when she collided with the light carrier Vengeance while docking in Devonport on 7 November. On 1 February 1947, she joined the other ships of the Home Fleet as they rendezvoused with the battleship Vanguard, which was serving as the royal yacht to escort King George VI as he set out for the first royal tour of South Africa. Implacable hosted the king and his family on 7 February, staging a small air show for them after which the queen addressed the crew. After leaving the royals, she made port visits at Freetown, Sierra Leone, and Dakar, Senegal before arriving in the Western Mediterranean for more training. Arriving home on 7 March, she began a lengthy refit at Rosyth on 17 April.

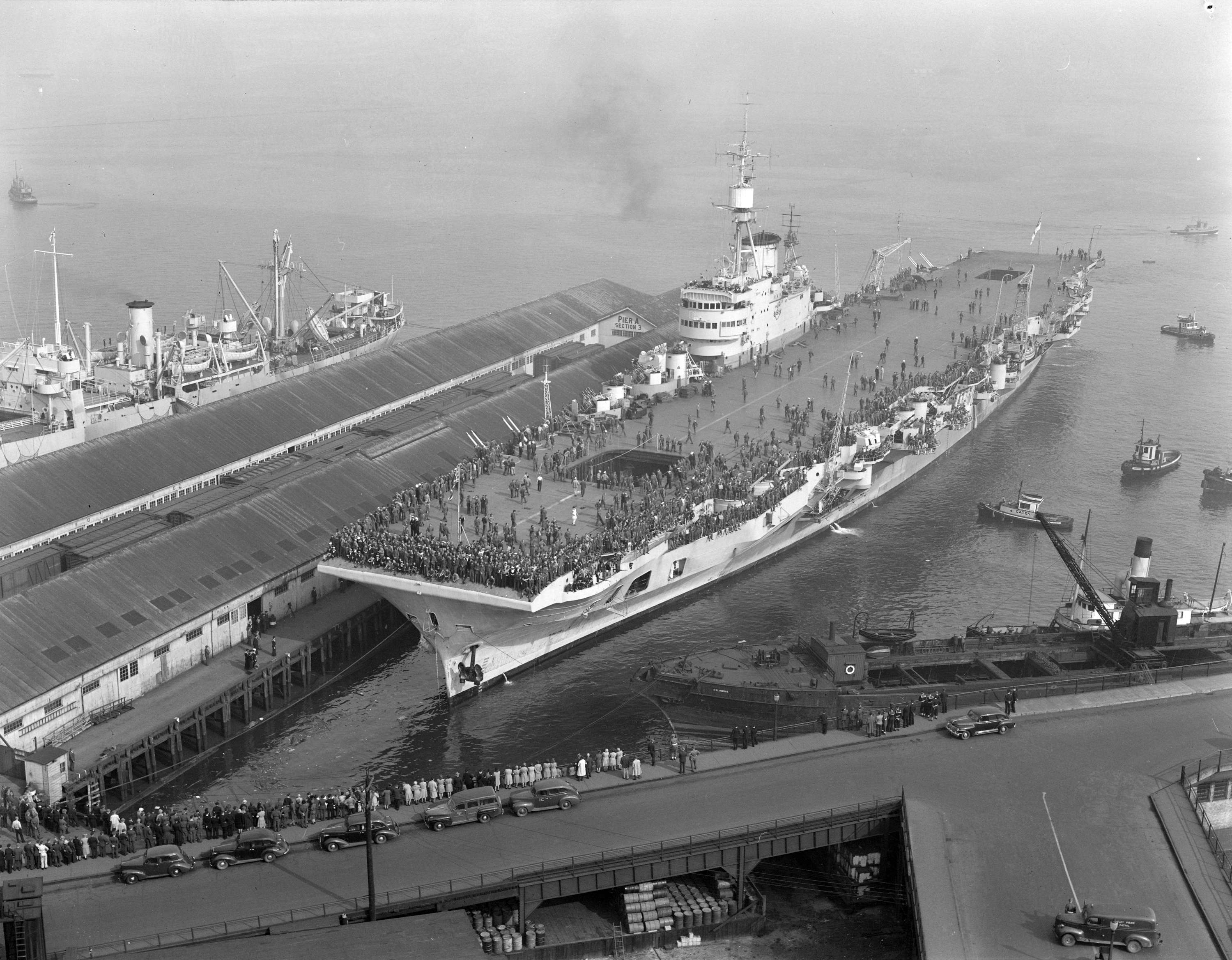
Implacable in 1947

Upon its completion in October 1947 she embarked 813 Squadron, flying Blackburn Firebrand TF.5s, and resumed training. Captain John Stevens relieved Mansergh on 9 February 1948, as the latter had been promoted. In June and July, the ship participated in a series of demonstrations for students in the Royal Navy's staff college. Among these was the first carrier landing by a Gloster Meteor jet-powered fighter, flown by Lieutenant-Commander Eric Brown, landings by prototypes of the Westland Wyvern and Short Sturgeon, rocket firing by Fireflies and an "attack" on Implacable by motor torpedo boats. She completed a 10-week refit on 10 November and resumed deck-landing practices. She sailed for Gibraltar on 27 February 1949 and 801 Squadron flew aboard on 5 March with its de Havilland Sea Hornets, the day after she arrived there. Admiral Sir Rhoderick McGrigor, commander-in-chief of Home Fleet, hoisted his flag aboard the carrier on 6 March before beginning a short exercise with some of the other ships of Home Fleet. She made port visits in Oslo and Bergen, Norway, in June, hosting King Haakon VII. While berthed at Portsmouth, King Abdullah I of Jordan visited on 19 August and the Prime Minister, Clement Attlee visited 10 days later. 702 Squadron flew aboard with seven de Havilland Sea Vampires in September to conduct carrier evaluations with the new fighter jets that lasted until 11 November. McGrigor was relieved by Admiral Vian ten days later.

Implacable spent February and March 1950 training in the Western Mediterranean and Captain H. W. Briggs assumed command on 1 April. She resumed flight training in the Irish Sea and off the western coast of Scotland until she made a port visit to Copenhagen in mid-July. King Frederik IX of Denmark inspected the ship on 18 July and Admiral Vian transferred his flag to Vanguard on 11 September. Two days later she was placed in reserve and slowly converted into a training ship by the addition of extra accommodation and classrooms. During this time she was considered for a major reconstruction that would combine her two hangars into a single hangar with a height of 17 feet 6 inches (5.33 m) and allow her to operate 30,000-pound (14,000 kg) aircraft. In addition her armament would be modernised and the fuel supply for her aircraft would be more than doubled. A similar reconstruction was then in progress for Victorious, but it proved to be much more expensive than planned and also took more time than had been estimated. Short of both time and money for the project, the Admiralty cancelled the modernisation in June 1952.

Implacable was recommissioned on 16 January 1952 as the flagship of the Home Fleet Training Squadron. On 13 February she arrived at Dover to serve as the port's guard ship before and after the state funeral of King George VI, to salute royalty and heads of state arriving by sea. After its conclusion, the ship sailed for the western Mediterranean to rendezvous with her sister for exercises. In June the two sisters represented a fast troop convoy being attacked by aircraft during an air defence exercise. They visited Copenhagen in the next month before returning home. Implacable sailed for Gibraltar on 25 September and made a port visit to Lisbon, Portugal, before returning to Devonport for a refit. On 16 November she had an oil fire in her galley that damaged her electrical wiring badly enough to require extending her refit to 20 January 1953. She spent most of February and March in the western Mediterranean together with her sister, participating in exercises before sailing to Southampton for a brief refit.

For the Coronation Fleet Review of Queen Elizabeth II on 15 June, she flew the flag of Vice Admiral John Stevens, her former commanding officer, now Flag Officer, Home Fleet Training Squadron. On 5 September Rear Admiral H. L. F. Adams relieved Stevens and the ship joined Indefatigable for fleet exercises off the Scilly Isles and in the Bristol Channel the following month. She ferried the 1st Battalion, Argyll & Sutherland Highlanders from Devonport to Trinidad in response to a crisis in British Guiana, and transported a battalion of the Royal Welch Fusiliers from Trinidad to Jamaica in October, returning home on 11 November. On 19 August 1954, she was relieved as flagship by the light carrier Theseus.

=== Decommissioning and disposal ===
Implacable was decommissioned on 1 September 1954 and sold to Thos. W. Ward for breaking up on 27 October 1955 after being towed to Gareloch. Implacable was scrapped at Inverkeithing beginning the following month.

== Squadrons embarked ==
Squadron	Aircraft operated	Embarked (from – to)	Notes and sources
801 NAS	Supermarine Seafire L. III de Havilland Sea Hornet F.20	8 November – 9 December 1944; 15 March 1945 – 3 June 1946; 5 March 1948 – 3 July 1950	
828 NAS	Fairey Barracuda II; Grumman TBF Avenger	23 September – 31 October 1944; 29 November – 9 December 1944; 13 March 1945 – 3 June 1946	
841 NAS	Fairey Barracuda II	30 August – 31 October 1944	
880 NAS	Supermarine Seafire F/LF. III	8–29 November 1944; 15 March – 25 August 1945	
1771 NAS	Fairey Firefly I	22 September – 7 November 1944; 16–29 November 1944; 5–9 December 1944; 12 March – 13 September 1945	
887 NAS	Supermarine Seafire III	16–30 October 1944	Returned to Indefatigable
894 NAS	Supermarine Seafire F. III	16 October – 21 November 1944	Returned to Indefatigable
1790 NAS	Fairey Firefly INF	18 January – 3 June 1946	
813 NAS	Blackburn Firebrand TF.5	October 1947 – July 1950	
815	Fairey Barracuda TR.3	May – June 1950	Training unit
702	de Havilland Sea Vampire F.20	September – November 1949	Trials unit

== Bibliography ==
- Brown, David (1977). WWII Fact Files: Aircraft Carriers. New York: Arco Publishing. ISBN 0-668-04164-1.
- Brown, J. D. (2009). Carrier Operations in World War II. Annapolis, Maryland: Naval Institute Press. ISBN 978-1-59114-108-2.
- Campbell, John (1985). Naval Weapons of World War II. Annapolis, Maryland: Naval Institute Press. ISBN 0-87021-459-4.
- Chesneau, Roger (1995). Aircraft Carriers of the World, 1914 to the Present: An Illustrated Encyclopedia (New, Revised ed.). Annapolis, Maryland: Naval Institute Press. ISBN 0-87021-902-2.
- Chesneau, Roger, ed. (1980). Conway's All the World's Fighting Ships 1922–1946. Greenwich, UK: Conway Maritime Press. ISBN 0-85177-146-7.
- Colledge, J. J.; Warlow, Ben (2006) [1969]. Ships of the Royal Navy: The Complete Record of All Fighting Ships of the Royal Navy from the 15th Century to the Present (3rd Rev ed.). London: Chatham Publishing. ISBN 978-1-86176-281-8. OCLC 67375475.
- Friedman, Norman (1988). British Carrier Aviation: The Evolution of the Ships and Their Aircraft. Annapolis, Maryland: Naval Institute Press. ISBN 0-87021-054-8.
- Hobbs, David (2013). British Aircraft Carriers: Design, Development and Service Histories. Barnsley, UK: Seaforth Publishing. ISBN 978-1-84832-138-0.
- Hobbs, David (2011). The British Pacific Fleet: The Royal Navy's Most Powerful Strike Force. Annapolis, Maryland: Naval Institute Press. ISBN 978-1-59114-044-3.
- Lenton, H. T. (1998). British & Empire Warships of the Second World War. Annapolis, Maryland: Naval Institute Press. ISBN 1-55750-048-7.
- McCart, Neil (2000). The Illustrious & Implacable Classes of Aircraft Carrier 1940–1969. Cheltenham, UK: Fan Publications. ISBN 1-901225-04-6.
- Rohwer, Jürgen (2005). Chronology of the War at Sea 1939–1945: The Naval History of World War Two (Third Rev ed.). Annapolis, Maryland: Naval Institute Press. ISBN 1-59114-119-2.
- Sturtivant, Ray (1984). The Squadrons of the Fleet Air Arm. Tonbridge, UK: Air-Britain (Historians). ISBN 0-85130-120-7.
