= 828 Naval Air Squadron =

Inactive flying squadron of the Royal Navy's Fleet Air Arm

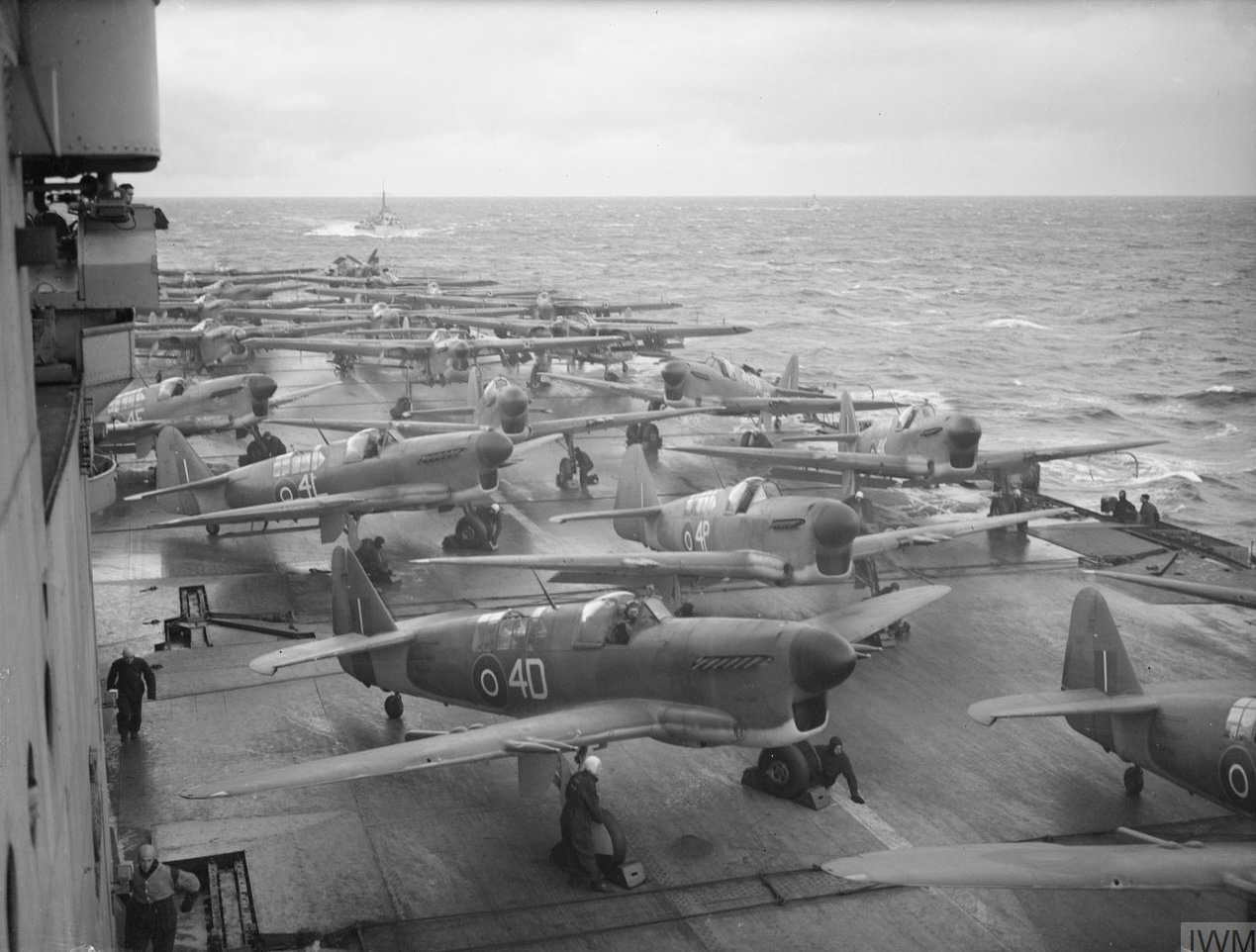
- Fairey Fireflies (1771 Squadron), Fairey Barracudas (828 Squadron), and Supermarine Seafires (880 Squadron) of the Fleet Air Arm on the flight deck of HMS Implacable warming up ready to make strike on enemy shipping at the entrance to Alten Fjord, Norway.
- Active: 1940–1943; 1944–1946
- Disbanded: 3 June 1946
- Country: United Kingdom
- Branch: Royal Navy
- Type: Torpedo Bomber Reconnaissance squadron
- Role: Carrier-based: anti-submarine warfare (ASW); anti-surface warfare (ASuW)
- Part of: Fleet Air Arm
- Home station: See Naval air stations section for full list.
- Engagements: World War II: Operation Husky; Operation Goodwood; Air raids on Japan
- Battle honours: Mediterranean 1941-43; Norway 1944; Japan 1945

Commanders
- Notable commanders: Lieutenant Commander(A) F.A. Swanton, DSC, RN

Insignia
- Identification Markings: 5A+, later S5A+ (Albacore); single letters (Barracuda); 1A+ (Barracuda November 1941); A1A+ (Barracuda January 1945); single letters (Avenger); 370-386 (Avenger later)
- Fin Carrier Codes: N (Avenger later)

Aircraft flown
- Bomber: Fairey Albacore; Fairey Swordfish; Fairey Barracuda; Grumman Avenger

828 Naval Air Squadron (828 NAS), also known as 828 Squadron, was a Fleet Air Arm (FAA) naval air squadron of the United Kingdom’s Royal Navy (RN). It last operated with Grumman Avenger and served on a number of the Navy's aircraft carriers during the Second World War. It also used Fairey Swordfish, Fairey Albacore and Fairey Barracuda, before decommissioning after the end of the war.

Formed in September 1940 as a torpedo spotter reconnaissance squadron. It operated in a number of the theatres of the Second World War, carrying out a number of attacks on enemy targets including the German battleship Tirpitz in Norway.

== History ==
=== Malta and the Mediterranean ===
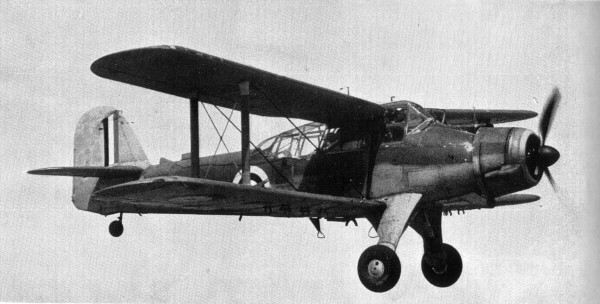
Fairey Albacore; an example of the type used by 828 Squadron

The squadron was initially equipped with nine Fairey Albacore torpoedo bomber aircraft on its formation as a Torpedo, spotter, and reconnaissance (TSR) squadron at RNAS Lee-on-Solent (HMS Daedalus), Hampshire, and then moved to Scotland to operate anti-submarine patrols with RAF Coastal Command.

They embarked aboard HMS Victorious in July 1941 and carried out an attack on Kirkenes, Norway. Five of the squadron's aircraft were lost in the attack. The squadron was then regrouped and sailed to Gibraltar in August aboard HMS Argus.

They were then transported to Hal Far, Malta aboard HMS Ark Royal. From there the squadron attacked enemy shipping attempting to transport supplies to the Axis forces in Libya. In March 1942 they and 830 Naval Air Squadron formed the Naval Air Squadron Malta, which went on to attack enemy warships and convoys operating in the Mediterranean. Re-supply problems, partially alleviated by the Malta convoys led to the number of operational aircraft being reduced to just two. In December 1942 the remnants of 826 and 830 squadrons were absorbed.

828 and 821 Naval Air Squadrons attacked shipping in May 1943, and provided flare illumination for naval bombardments of Pantellaria. In July, from Hal Far on Malta, 828 squadron's Albacores (torpedo spotter reconnaissance) supported the Allied invasion of Sicily (Operation Husky). 828 then moved to Monastir, Tunisia, where they disbanded in September 1943. Together 828 and 830 squadrons had sunk 30 enemy ships and damaged another 50.

=== Tirpitz and the Far East ===
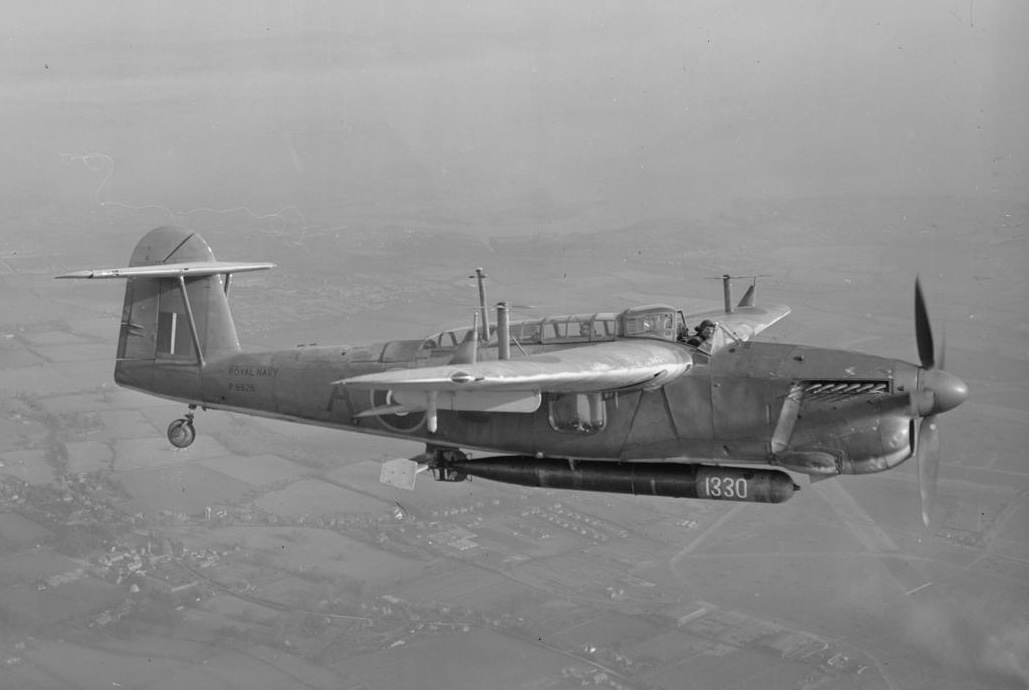
Fairey Barracuda Mk II; an example of the type used by 828 Squadron

828 Squadron was re-formed as a torpedo bomber reconnaissance squadron in March 1944. Equipped with 12 Barracuda IIs and from April 1944 were based at HMS Owl for training before joining the 2nd Naval Torpedo Bomber Reconnaissance Wing and joined the Home Fleet aboard HMS Implacable in August that year. They briefly transferred to HMS Formidable in August 1944 and carried out attacks on the German battleship Tirpitz as part of Operation Goodwood.

They were briefly at RNAS Hatston, before re-boarding HMS Implacable and carrying out attacks on enemy shipping off the Norwegian coast in October. 828 Squadron was re-equipped with 21 Grumman Avenger Is and IIs in January 1945, and then joined HMS Trumpeter. They were back aboard HMS Implacable by March 1945, and sailed with her to Ceylon, subsequently disembarking at Trincomalee in April 1945. 828 Squadron then joined the 8th Carrier Air Group and carried out attacks on Truk and the Japanese mainland.

After the Japanese surrender the squadron returned to Nowra on 25 August 1945, and remained there until May 1946.

== Aircraft operated ==
The squadron operated a variety of different aircraft and versions:

- Fairey Albacore torpedo bomber (September 1940 - September 1943)
- Fairey Swordfish I torpedo bomber (October - November 1941)
- Fairey Barracuda Mk II torpedo and dive bomber March 1944 - February 1945)
- Grumman Avenger Mk.I torpedo bomber (January - September 1945)
- Grumman Avenger Mk.II torpedo bomber (February - September 1945)
- Grumman Avenger Mk.III torpedo bomber (August 1945 - April 1946)

== Battle honours ==
The following three Battle Honours have been awarded to 828 Naval Air Squadron:

- Mediterranean 1941-43
- Norway 1944
- Japan 1945

== Assignments ==
828 Naval Air Squadron was assigned as needed to form part of a number of larger units:

- 2nd Naval TBR Wing (24 January 1944 - 28 November 1944)
- 8th Carrier Air Group (30 June 1945 - April 1946)

== Naval air stations and aircraft carriers ==
828 Naval Air Squadron was active at various naval air stations of the Royal Navy and Royal Air Force stations, both within the United Kingdom and internationally. Additionally, it operated from several Royal Navy fleet carriers, as well as other airbases located abroad.

=== World War Two air stations and aircraft carriers ===
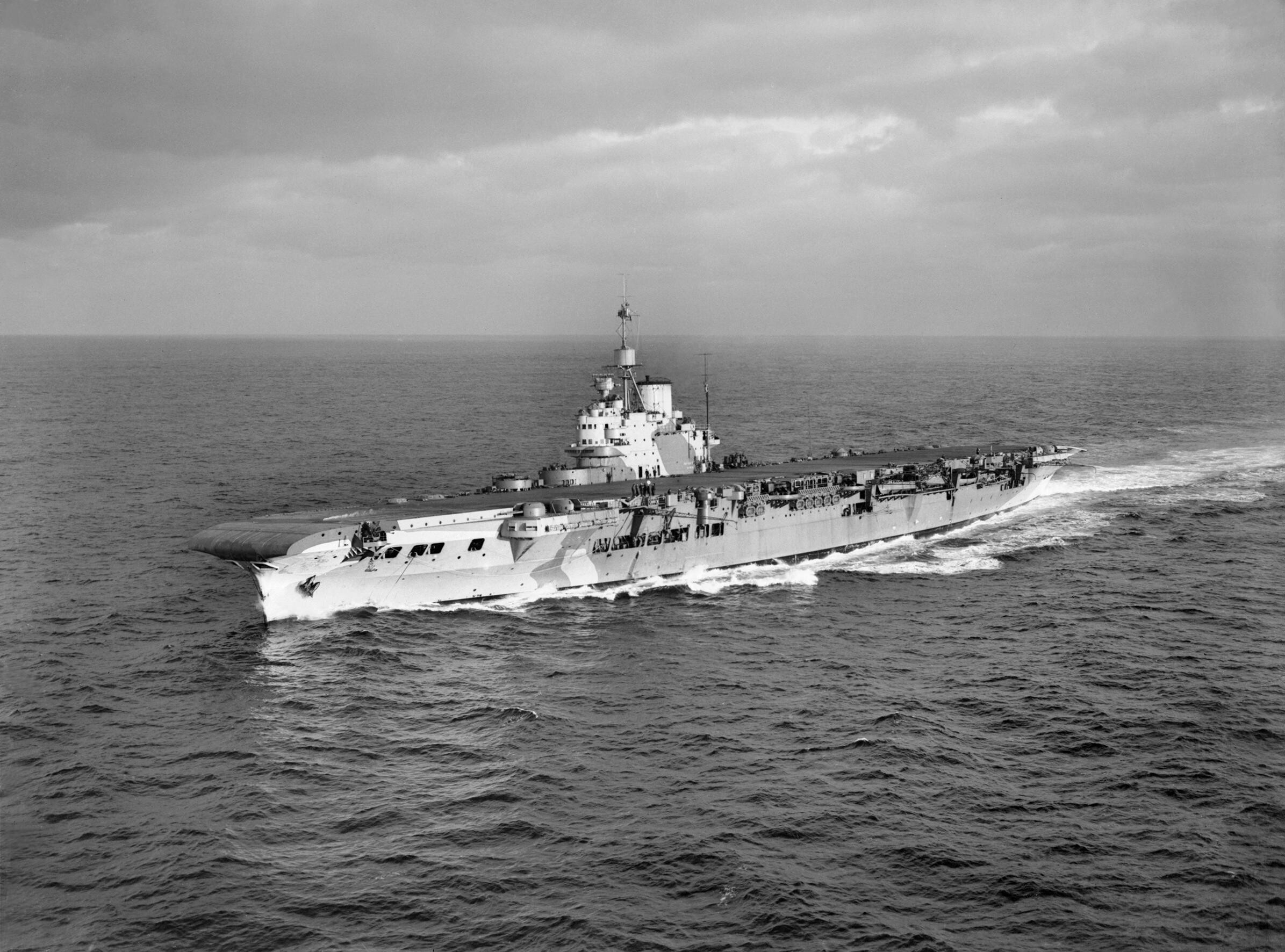
HMS Victorious

List of air stations and aircraft carriers used by 828 Naval Air Squadron during World War two including dates:

1940 - 1943

- Royal Naval Air Station Lee-on-Solent (HMS Daedalus), Hampshire, (15 August - 25 October 1940)
- Royal Naval Air Station St Merryn (HMS Vulture), Cornwall, (25 October - 18 November 1940)
- Royal Naval Air Station Campbeltown (HMS Landrail), Argyll and Bute, (18 November - 17 March 1940)
  - Royal Naval Air Station Crail (HMS Jackdaw), Fife, (Detachment 21 January - 23 March 1941)
- Royal Naval Air Station Donibristle (HMS Merlin), Fife, (17 - 21 March 1941)
- Royal Naval Air Station Hatston (HMS Sparrowhawk), Mainland, Orkney, (18 Gp) (21 March - 23 May 1941)
- Royal Air Force Sumburgh, Shetland Islands, (23 - 24 May 1941)
- Royal Naval Air Station Hatston (HMS Sparrowhawk), Mainland, Orkney, (24 May - 2 July 1941)
- HMS Victorious (2 July - 8 August 1941)
- Royal Naval Air Station Crail (HMS Jackdaw), Fife, (8 August - 26 September 1941)
- HMS Euryalus/HMS Kenya (crews passage to Malta) (17 - 29 September 1941)
- HMS Argus (26 September - 16 October 1941)
- HMS Ark Royal (16 - 18 October 1941)
- Royal Air Force Hal Far, Malta, (18 October 1941 - 8 June 1943)
- Royal Air Force Ta Kali, Malta, (8 - 28 June 1943)
- Monastir Airfield, Tunisia, (28 June - 1 September 1943)
- disbanded - (1 September 1943)

1944 - 1946

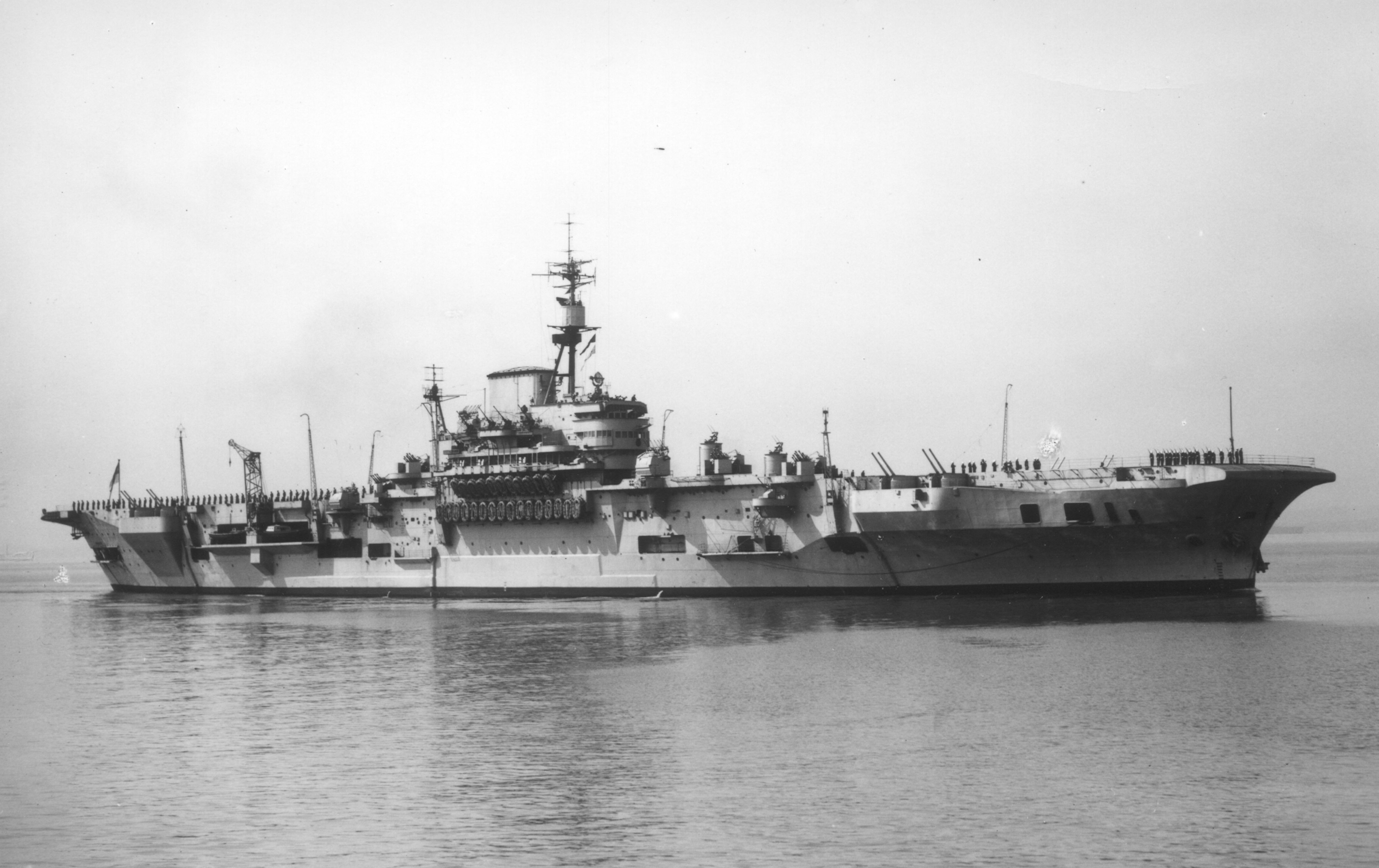
HMS Implacable

- Royal Naval Air Station Lee-on-Solent (HMS Daedelus), Hampshire, (1 March - 14 April 1944)
- Royal Naval Air Station Fearn (HMS Owl), Scottish Highlands, (14 April - 5 July 1944)
- Royal Naval Air Station Machrihanish (HMS Landrail), Argyll and Bute, (5 July - 8 August 1944)
- HMS Implacable (8 - 18 August 19.44)
- HMS Formidable (18 August - 2 September 1944)
- Royal Naval Air Station Donibristle (HMS Merlin), Fife, (2 - 13 September 1944)
- Royal Naval Air Station Machrihanish (HMS Landrail), Argyll and Bute, (13 - 23 September 19.44)
- HMS Implacable (23 September - 21 October 1944)
- Royal Naval Air Station Hatston (HMS Sparrowhawk), Mainland, Orkney, (21 - 24 October 1944)
- HMS Implacable (24 - 31 October 1944)
- Royal Naval Air Station Hatston (HMS Sparrowhawk), Mainland, Orkney, (31 October - 29 November 19.44)
- HMS Implacable (29 November - 9 December 1944)
- Royal Naval Air Station Hatston (HMS Sparrowhawk), Mainland, Orkney, (9 December 1944 - 5 February 1945)
  - HMS Trumpeter (Detachment 24 - 27 January 1945)
- Royal Naval Air Station Fearn (HMS Owl), Scottish Highlands, (5 - 10 February 1945)
- Royal Naval Air Station Inskip (HMS Nightjar), Lancashire, (10 February - 5 March 1945)
- Royal Naval Air Station Fearn (HMS Owl), Scottish Highlands, (5 - 12 March 1945)
- Royal Naval Air Station Hatston (HMS Sparrowhawk), Mainland, Orkney, (12 - 15 March 1945)
- HMS Implacable (15 March - 9 April 1945)
- Royal Naval Air Station Trincomalee (HMS Bambara), Ceylon, (9 - 22 April 1945)
- HMS Implacable (22 April - 7 May 1945)
- Royal Naval Air Station Jervis Bay (HMS Nabswick), Jervis Bay Territory, (7 - 24 May 19.45)
- HMS Implacable (24 - 29 May 1945)
- Royal Naval Air Station Ponam (HMS Nabaron), Admiralty Islands, (29 May - 9 June 1945)
- HMS Implacable (9 - 12 June 1945)
  - Royal Naval Air Station Ponam (HMS Nabaron), Admiralty Islands, (Detachment nine aircraft 9 - 12 June 1945)
- HMS Implacable (12 June - 24 August 1945)
- Royal Naval Air Station Nowra (HMS Nabbington), New South Wales, (24 August - 17 November 1945)
- Royal Naval Air Station Schofields (HMS Nabthorpe), New South Wales, (27 November 1945 - 21 January 1946)
  - HMS Implacable (Detachment two aircraft 8 December 1945 - 18 January 1946)
- HMS Implacable (21 January - 14 March 1946)
- Royal Naval Air Station Schofields (HMS Nabthorpe), New South Wales, (14 March - 29 April 1946)
- HMS Implacable (for ditching aircraft) (29 April - 3 June 1946)
- disbanded - UK (3 June 1946)

== Commanding officers ==
List of commanding officers of 828 Naval Air Squadron:

1940 - 1943

- Lieutenant E.A. Greenwood, RN, from 15 September 1940
- Lieutenant Commander(A) L.A. Cubitt, RN, from 26 September 1940
- Lieutenant Commander D.E. Langmore, DSC, RN, from 6 May 1941 ( † 19 December 1941)
- Lieutenant G.M. Haynes, RAN, from 20 December 1941
- Lieutenant Commander M.E. Lashmore, DSC, RN, from 30 March 1942
- Lieutenant Commander A. Gregory, RN, from 28 February 1943 ( † 12 March 1943)
- Lieutenant H.H. Britton, RN, from 12 March 1943
- Lieutenant Commander(A) J.F. Turner, RNVR, from 8 May 1943
- disbanded - 1 September 1943

1944 - 1946

- Lieutenant Commander(A) F.A. Swanton, DSC, RN, from 1 March 1944
- Lieutenant Commander(A) R.E. Bradshaw, DSC & Two Bars, RN, from 31 August 1945
- disbanded - 3 June 1946

Note: Abbreviation (A) signifies Air Branch of the RN or RNVR.
