= Implacable-class aircraft carrier =

Class of British aircraft carriers

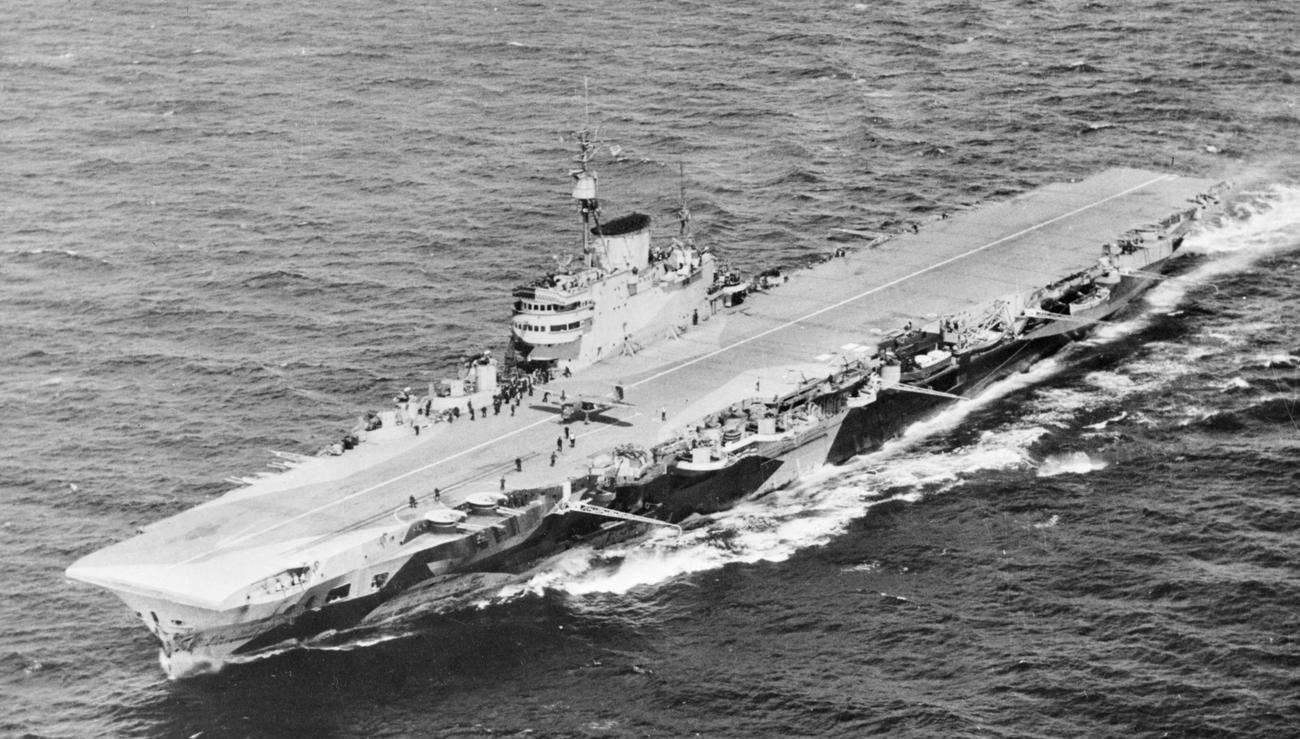
- Indefatigable underway, 7 November 1944

Class overview
- Name: Implacable class
- Operators: Royal Navy
- Preceded by: Illustrious class
- Succeeded by: Audacious class
- Built: 1939–1944
- In service: 1944–1955
- Completed: 2
- Scrapped: 2

General characteristics
- Type: Aircraft carrier
- Displacement: 32,110 long tons (32,630 t) (deep load)
- Length: 766 ft 6 in (233.6 m) (o/a); 730 ft (222.5 m) (waterline)
- Beam: 95 ft 9 in (29.2 m)
- Draught: 29 ft 4 in (8.9 m) (deep load)
- Installed power: 8 Admiralty 3-drum boilers; 148,000 shp (110,000 kW)
- Propulsion: 4 shafts; 4 geared steam turbines
- Speed: 32.5 knots (60.2 km/h; 37.4 mph)
- Range: 12,000 nmi (22,000 km; 14,000 mi) at 10 knots (19 km/h; 12 mph)
- Complement: 2,300 (1945)
- Sensors & processing systems: 1 × Type 277 height-finding radar; 1 × Type 279 early-warning radar; 1 × Type 281 early-warning radar; 6 × Type 282 gunnery radars; 4 × Type 285 gunnery radars
- Armament: 8 × twin QF 4.5-inch dual-purpose guns; 5 × octuple, 1 × quadruple QF 2-pdr anti-aircraft guns; 18–21 × twin, 17–19 × single Oerlikon 20 mm anti-aircraft guns
- Armour: Waterline belt: 4.5 in (114 mm); Flight deck: 3 in (76 mm); Bulkheads: 2 in (51 mm); Hangar sides: 2 in (51 mm); Magazines: 3–4.5 in (76–114 mm)
- Aircraft carried: 81
- Aviation facilities: 1 catapult

The Implacable-class aircraft carrier consisted of two aircraft carriers built for the Royal Navy during World War II. Derived from the design of the Illustrious class, they were faster and carried more aircraft than the older ships. They were initially assigned to the Home Fleet when completed in 1944 and attacked targets in Norway as well as the German battleship Tirpitz. Subsequently, they were assigned to the British Pacific Fleet (BPF).

Indefatigable was the first ship to go to the Pacific and attacked Japanese-controlled oil refineries in Sumatra en route. She participated in Operation Iceberg, the invasion of Okinawa in March–April 1945. Implacable's arrival in the Pacific was delayed by a refit and she did not begin operations against the Japanese until June. The sister ships participated in the attacks on the Japanese Home Islands in July and August. Indefatigable was the only carrier chosen to continue operations after most of the BPF withdrew to prepare for further operations in early August. After the Japanese formal surrender in September, Implacable ferried Allied troops and prisoners of war back to Australia and Canada for the rest of the year.

The sisters returned home in 1946; Indefatigable was used for the rest of the year to transport troops before being placed in reserve in 1947 and Implacable became the training carrier for Home Fleet. Indefatigable was converted into a training ship and reactivated in 1950 for service with the Home Fleet. Implacable was relegated to the reserve that same year and modified into a training ship in 1952. The sisters were scheduled for modernisation during the mid-1950s, but it was cancelled as the modernisation of Victorious before them proved expensive and lengthy. The sisters were decommissioned in 1954 and sold for scrap in 1955–1956.

== Background and description ==
The Implacable class had its origin as an improved version of the Illustrious-class aircraft carriers for the 1938 Naval Programme while still remaining within the 23,000 long tons (23,000 t) available from the tonnage allowed by the Second London Naval Treaty. The initial change was to increase the carriers' speed to no less than 32 knots (59 km/h; 37 mph) which required the addition of a fourth steam turbine and associated propeller shaft. Offsetting the additional weight of the machinery meant reductions in armour thicknesses in the hangar deck and the bulkheads at the ends of the hangar. At the same time the Director of Naval Construction (DNC) was developing a different modified Illustrious design (Design D) to carry an additional dozen aircraft (a total of 48) in a lower hangar that also incorporated the additional machinery of the initial design with the sacrifice of even more armour. Hangar height was initially planned as 13 feet 6 inches (4.1 m) in the upper hangar to accommodate the new Fairey Albacore torpedo bomber and 16 feet (4.9 m) in the lower hangar to accommodate taller amphibious aircraft, but a later change in policy raised the upper hangar height to 14 feet (4.3 m). Design D was submitted to the Board of Admiralty on 2 August 1938 and approved on 17 November. In April 1939 the lower hangar's height was reduced to 14 feet to compensate for the thickening of the hangar side armour to 2 inches (51 mm) and the idea of carrying amphibians in the hangar was abandoned.

The Implacable-class ships were 766 feet 6 inches (233.6 m) long overall and 730 feet (222.5 m) at the waterline. Their beam was 95 feet 9 inches (29.2 m) at the waterline and they had a draught of 29 feet 4 inches (8.9 m) at deep load. The ships were significantly overweight and displaced 32,110 long tons (32,630 t) at deep load. Their complement was approximately 2,300 officers and enlisted men in 1945. They had metacentric heights of 4.06 feet (1.2 m) at light load and 6.91 feet (2.1 m) at deep load as completed.

The ships were fitted with four Parsons geared steam turbines, each driving one shaft using steam supplied by eight Admiralty 3-drum boilers. The turbines were designed to produce a total of 148,000 shaft horsepower (110,000 kW), enough to give them a maximum speed of 32.5 knots (60.2 km/h; 37.4 mph). On their sea trials, the ships reached speeds of 31.89–32.06 knots (59.06–59.38 km/h; 36.70–36.89 mph) with 150,935–151,200 shp (112,552–112,750 kW). The Implacable class carried a maximum of 4,690–4,810 long tons (4,770–4,890 t) of fuel oil which gave them a range of 6,720–6,900 nautical miles (12,450–12,780 km; 7,730–7,940 mi) at 20 knots (37 km/h; 23 mph).

The 760-foot (231.6 m) armoured flight deck had a maximum width of 102 feet (31.1 m). The arrestor cables, crash barricades, aircraft catapult and lifts were designed to handle aircraft up to 20,000 pounds (9,100 kg) in weight. The carriers were fitted with nine arrestor cables aft that were designed to stop landing, at speeds of up to 60 knots (110 km/h; 69 mph). They were backed up by three crash barricades to prevent landing aircraft from crashing into aircraft parked on the ship's bow. In case of damage to the rear flight deck, the Implacable-class ships also mounted three additional forward arrestor cables to permit aircraft to land over the bow. A single BH3 hydraulic catapult was fitted on the forward part of the flight deck to launch 20,000-pound aircraft at 56 knots (104 km/h; 64 mph); lighter aircraft could be launched at a maximum speed of 66 knots (122 km/h; 76 mph). The ships were equipped with two lifts on the centreline, the forward of which measured 45 by 33 feet (13.7 by 10.1 m) and served only the upper hangar, and the aft lift (45 by 22 feet (13.7 by 6.7 m)) which served both hangars. The upper hangar was 458 feet (139.6 m) long and the lower hangar was 208 feet (63.4 m) long; both had a uniform width of 62 feet (18.9 m). Both hangars had a height of only 14 feet which precluded storage of Lend-Lease Vought F4U Corsair fighters as well as many post-war aircraft and helicopters. In case of fire the upper hangar could be divided by two fire curtains and the lower hangar had one fire curtain. Designed to stow 48 aircraft in their hangars, the use of a permanent deck park allowed the Implacable class to accommodate up to 81 aircraft. The crewmen, maintenance personnel and facilities needed to support these additional aircraft were housed in the lower hangar. The ships were provided with 94,650 imperial gallons (430,300 L; 113,670 US gal) of petrol, only enough for approximately five sorties per aircraft. (Note: A simple calculation of fuel capacity for 48 Supermarine Seafire III (48 × 175 imperial gallons (including a 90-gallon drop tank)), 12 Fairey Fireflys (12 × 191 imperial gallons) and 21 Grumman Avengers (21 × 278 imperial gallons) shows that 94,650 imperial gallons of fuel should suffice for 5.7 sorties per aircraft. Since aircraft will not return with completely empty tanks it seems that a figure of 6 to 7 sorties per aircraft is more likely.)

=== Armament, electronics, and armour ===
The ships' main armament consisted of sixteen QF 4.5-inch (110 mm) Mark II dual-purpose guns in eight powered RP 10 Mk II** twin-gun turrets, four in sponsons on each side of the hull. Unlike the Illustrious-class ships, the roofs of the gun turrets were flat and flush with the flight deck. The gun had a maximum range of 20,760 yards (18,980 m) at an elevation of +45° and a ceiling of 41,000 feet (12,000 m). Their light anti-aircraft defences included five octuple mounts for QF 2-pounder ("pom-pom") anti-aircraft guns, two on the flight deck forward of the island, one on the aft part of the island and two in sponsons on the port side of the hull. A single quadruple 2-pounder mount was also fitted on the port side of the hull. The 2-pounder gun had a maximum range of 6,800 yd (6,200 m). The two ships were also fitted with approximately sixty Oerlikon 20 mm autocannon in varying numbers of single and twin-gun mounts. These guns had a maximum range of 4,800 yd (4,400 m), but many were replaced by 40 mm Bofors AA guns when the ships were transferred to the Pacific War as the 20 mm shell was unlikely to destroy a kamikaze before it hit the ship. The Bofors gun had a maximum range of 10,750 yd (9,830 m). Two additional quadruple "pom-pom" mounts were added to Implacable before she joined the British Pacific Fleet in 1945. After the war, more Oerlikons were exchanged for Bofors guns. By April 1946, the sisters had 11–12 Bofors guns and 19–30 Oerlikons each.

The 4.5-inch guns were controlled by four Mk V* (M) fire-control directors, each mounting a Type 285 gunnery radar. Two of the directors were positioned on the flight deck, one each fore and aft of the island, a third was on the island, aft of the funnel, and the fourth director was on the port side of the hull, below the flight deck. Each director sent its data to a Fuze Keeping Clock AA fire-control system for gunnery calculations. Each "pom-pom" was provided with its own Mk IV director that carried a range-only Type 282 gunnery radar.

The specifics of the Implacable-class ships' radar suite is not readily available in published sources. They were fitted with the Type 277 surface-search/height-finding radar on top of the bridge and a Type 293 target indicator radar on the foremast. The ships probably carried Type 279 and Type 281B early-warning radars, based on the radars fitted aboard the Illustrious-class carrier Victorious late in the war.

The Implacable-class ships had a flight deck protected by 3 in (76 mm) of armour. The sides of the hangars were designed to be 1.5 inches (38 mm) thick to protect the hangar from low-level attacks with 500-pound (230 kg) semi-armour-piercing bombs, but were supposedly thickened to 2 inches (51 mm) late in the design process at the cost of reducing the height of the lower hangar. Naval historian Norman Friedman wrote: "Ironically, it appears that the ships were actually built with 1.5-inch ... armour." The ends of the hangars were protected by 2-inch bulkheads and the armour of the hangar deck ranged from 1.5 to 2.5 inches (38 to 64 mm) in thickness.

The waterline armour belt was 4.5 inches (114 mm) thick, but only covered the central portion of the ship to form the armoured citadel. The belt was closed by 1.5 to 2-inch transverse bulkheads fore and aft. The underwater defence system was a layered system of liquid- and air-filled compartments as used in the Illustrious class and was estimated to be able to resist a 750-pound (340 kg) explosive charge. The magazines for the 4.5-inch guns lay outside the armoured citadel and were protected by 2 to 3-inch thick roofs, 4.5-inch sides and 1.5 to 2-inch ends.

=== Planned modernisation ===
The two Implacables were tentatively scheduled to be modernised in 1953–55 with Implacable following Victorious. The draft Staff Requirements were drawn up in July 1951. This included combining the two hangars into a single 17-foot-6-inch (5.33 m) hangar, strengthening the flight deck and aircraft handling equipment to deal with 30,000-pound (14,000 kg) aircraft, enlarging the lifts to 55 by 32 feet (16.8 by 9.8 m), adding a gallery deck between the hangar and the flight deck to accommodate the additional personnel required, the addition of steam catapults, and the increase of her aviation fuel stowage to 240,000 imperial gallons (1,100,000 L; 290,000 US gal). Other desired improvements were new boilers to increase her endurance, more space for the latest radars, and the replacement of her anti-aircraft armament with the British version of the 3"/70 Mark 26 gun and sextuple mounts for the Bofors guns.

By October 1951, the estimated completion date for Victorious's modernisation was already a year past the initial estimate of April 1954. Implacable was scheduled to begin her modernisation in April 1953 for completion in 1956, but the Director of Dockyards pointed out that existing schedules prevented her from beginning any earlier than April 1955 unless the modernisations of two cruisers and the guided missile test ship RFA Girdle Ness were delayed. The Controller of the Navy asked if the time and cost of the reconstruction could be reduced, but the minimum modifications were the most expensive as they involved structural alterations. The Controller ordered the Director of Dockyards to plan for rebuilding Implacable between June 1953 and December 1956 even after the latter protested that even a limited modernisation would require about three-quarters of the structural work of the original plan and that the shortage of skilled workers (already insufficient for Victorious by herself) would delay work on both ships. In order to reduce the amount of structural work, the requirement to replace the boilers was cancelled and the ship would receive existing radars instead of systems then still under development. In January 1952, the ship's new armament was finalized at six twin-gun 3"/70 mounts and three sextuple Bofors mounts. Five months later the Admiralty decided that Victorious would be the last fleet carrier modernised as experience showed that the process would take longer and cost more than was practicable.

== Ships ==
Construction data
Name	Builder	Laid down	Launched	Completed	Fate
HMS Implacable	Fairfield Shipbuilding and Engineering Co., Govan, Scotland	21 March 1939	10 December 1942	28 August 1944	Sold for scrap, 27 October 1955
HMS Indefatigable	John Brown & Co., Clydebank, Scotland	3 November 1939	8 December 1942	3 May 1944	Sold for scrap, September 1956

== Construction and service ==
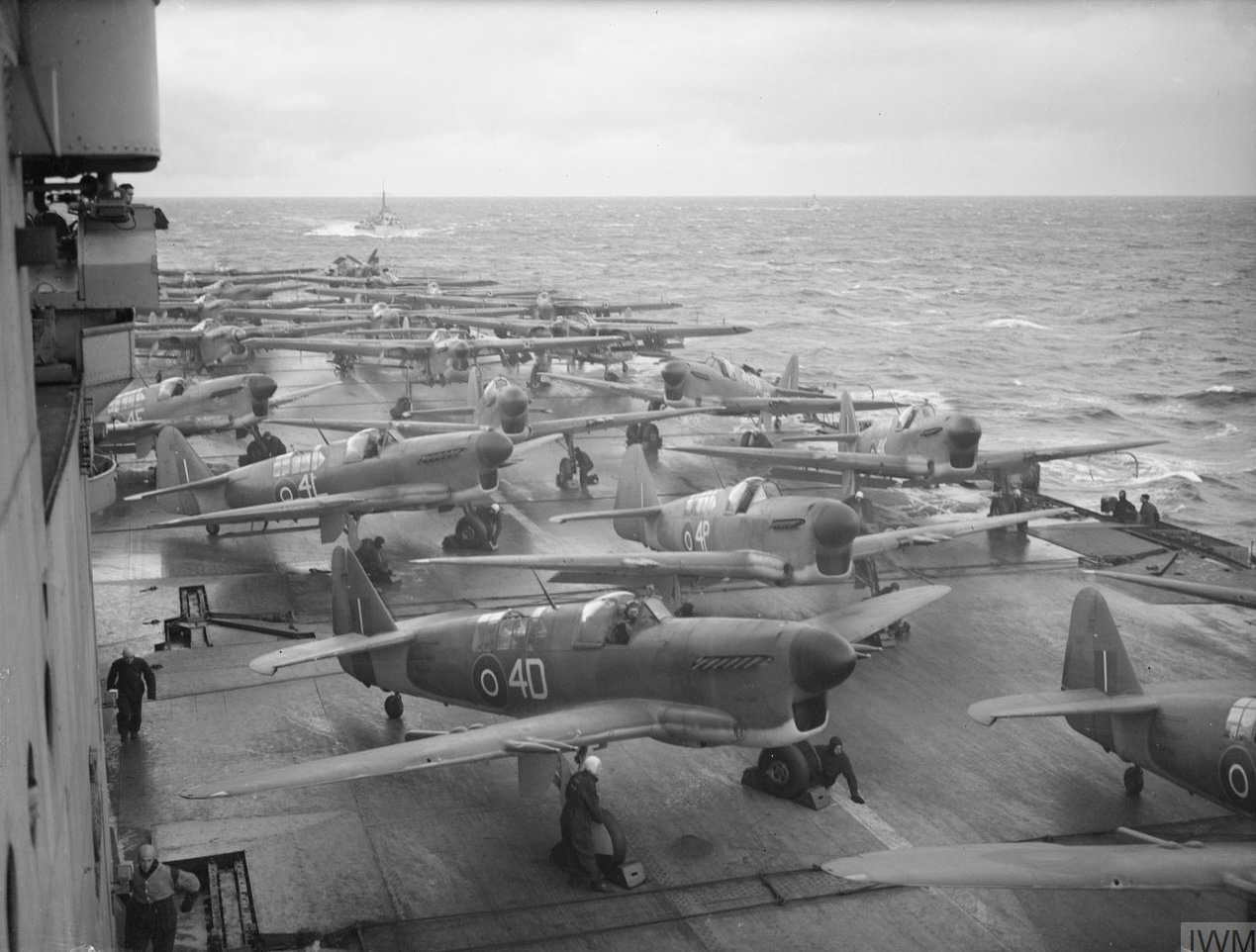
Fairey Fireflies (front) and Fairey Barracudas (rear) aboard Implacable preparing for a mission off Norway, 26 November 1944

Two ships were originally planned, but only one carrier was included in the 1938 Naval Programme as the other was delayed a year by the government. While under construction, the ships had their forward lift enlarged to take non-folding aircraft like the Hawker Sea Hurricane and the early models of the Supermarine Seafire, the flight deck was widened abreast the forward lift, splinter protection was added as were seven diesel generators, each in their own watertight compartment. All these changes increased the ships' displacement by 540 long tons (550 t) at deep load.

Implacable's construction was suspended in 1940 in favour of escorts needed in the Battle of the Atlantic so that the two carriers were launched within days of each other. She embarked portions of her air wing for training in late August and was assigned to the Home Fleet on 7 October at Scapa Flow after working up. She joined ships searching for Tirpitz a week later and some of her Fairey Fireflies spotted the battleship off Håkøya Island near Tromsø. Subsequently, her Fireflies successfully attacked targets in Norway. In late October, the carrier's Seafires arrived and she participated in Operation Athletic off the Norwegian coast, sinking four warships and two merchant ships and damaging a German submarine. In November and December, Implacable provided air cover for minelaying operations and attacked German shipping off the Norwegian coast. On 15 December she began a refit at Rosyth preparatory to her transfer to the BPF, which included augmenting her light AA armament.

When the refit was completed on 10 March 1945, the ship embarked an enlarged air wing with 81 aircraft (48 Seafires, 12 Fireflies, and 21 Grumman TBF Avenger torpedo bombers), the largest number of aircraft aboard a British carrier up to that time. Implacable arrived at Sydney, Australia, in May and joined the other carriers of the 1st Aircraft Carrier Squadron (1st ACS) at Manus Island after their return from the invasion of Okinawa in June. On 14–15 June, the carrier attacked the Japanese naval base at Truk. After working up with the other carriers, the ship sailed with the 1st ACS on 6 July to rendezvous with the American carriers of Task Force 38 off the Japanese home island of Honshu ten days later. The British carriers began flying sorties against Japanese targets on Honshu on 17 July and Implacable's aircraft, before departing the area on 11 August to replenish, flew over 1,000 sorties. She arrived at Sydney on 24 August and spent most of the rest of the year ferrying Allied prisoners of war and soldiers back to Australia and Canada. In January 1946, together with her sister Indefatigable and several other ships, she made a number of port visits in Australia and New Zealand. The ship was refitted in Sydney in preparation for her return home on 3 June where she became the deck-landing training carrier for the Home Fleet.

Implacable temporarily became a trials carrier in October 1947 as her own air group was not yet ready and she was refitted from October to December 1948 in preparation of service as the Home Fleet flagship. She embarked a squadron each of de Havilland Sea Hornets and Blackburn Firebrands in April 1949 and became the flagship of Admiral Sir Philip Vian on 29 April. A squadron of de Havilland Sea Vampires flew from her deck later that year and her air group was augmented by a squadron of Fairey Barracudas in 1950. Implacable was placed in reserve in September 1950 and slowly converted into a training ship by the addition of extra accommodation and classrooms, including the addition of a deckhouse on her flight deck. She was recommissioned in January 1952 as the flagship of the Home Fleet Training Squadron. Together with Indefatigable, she was present during the Coronation Fleet Review of Queen Elizabeth II on 15 June 1953. Four months later, Implacable ferried a battalion of troops from Plymouth to Trinidad in response to a crisis in British Guiana. She was decommissioned on 1 September 1954 and sold for breaking up on 27 October 1955.

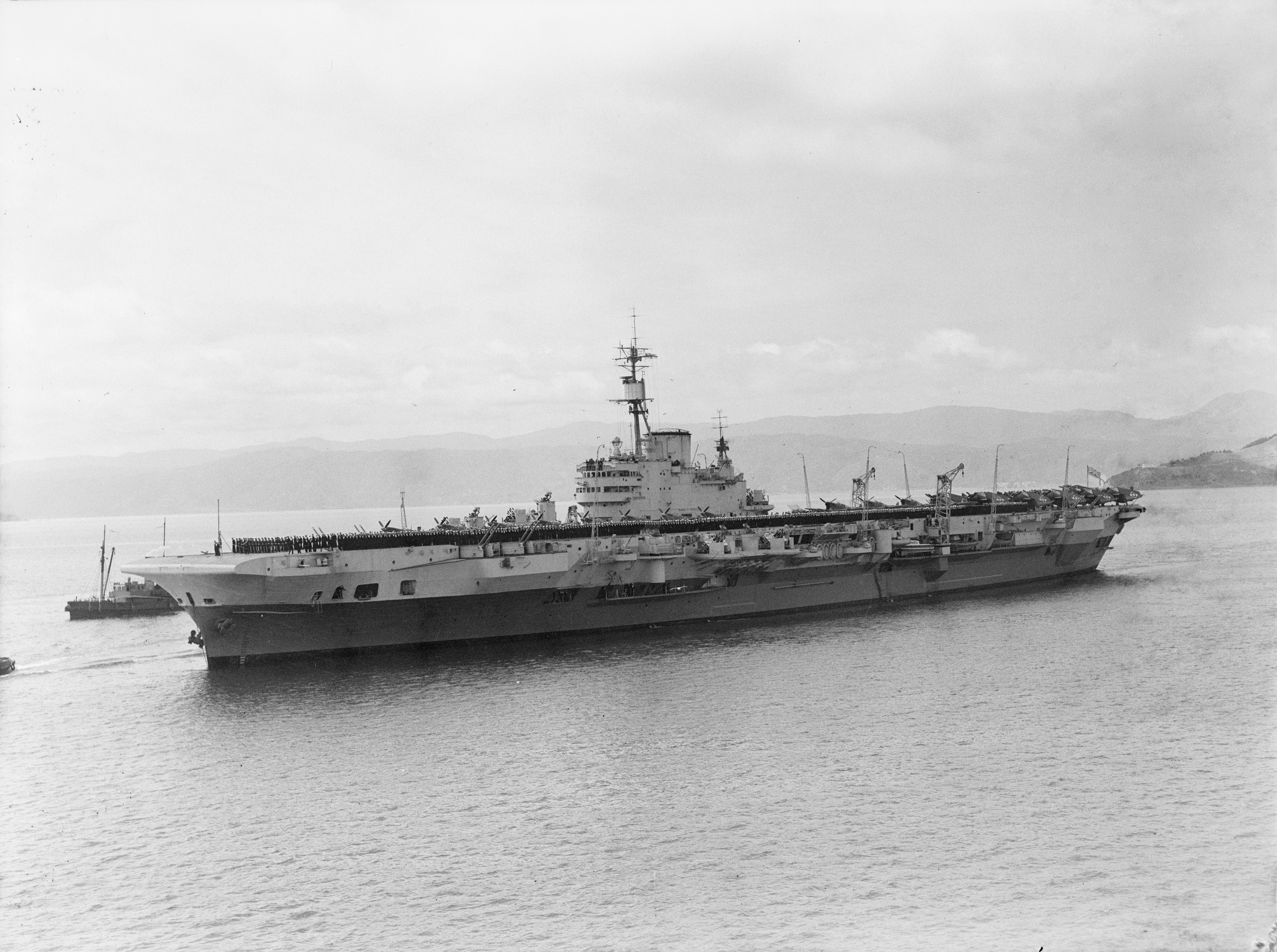
Indefatigable anchored in Wellington harbour, November 1945

While Indefatigable was still conducting builder's trials, a de Havilland Mosquito landed aboard on 25 March 1944, piloted by Lieutenant Eric Brown. This was the first landing by a twin-engined aeroplane on a carrier. After working up the ship was assigned to the Home Fleet in early July 1944 with an air group of Seafires, Fireflies and Barracudas. On 17 July, she participated in Operation Mascot, an attack on Tirpitz that was foiled by German smoke screens. The following month, Indefatigable's aircraft provided air cover to minelaying operations and attacked targets in Norway. She was also assigned to a series of attacks on Tirpitz, Operation Goodwood, in late August which failed to significantly damage the battleship.

Indefatigable was assigned to the BPF in November and she arrived in Colombo, Ceylon, on 10 December where she joined the 1st ACS. Together with the other carriers of the BPF, she attacked oil refineries in Sumatra in January 1945 (Operation Lentil and Operation Meridian) before sailing to Sydney to prepare for operations in the Pacific. The BPF joined the American Fifth Fleet at Ulithi on 20 March and attacked airfields on the Sakishima Islands, south of Okinawa, beginning on 26 March, as part of the preparations for Operation Iceberg. During these operations, Indefatigable became the first British carrier to be hit by a kamikaze when one penetrated the combat air patrol (CAP) and struck the base of her island on 1 April. The bomb carried by the kamikaze did not detonate and this limited casualties to 21 men killed and 27 wounded. Damage to the ship was minimal and the flight deck was back in operation thirty minutes later. After Okinawa had been secured, the BPF arrived back at Sydney on 7 June and Indefatigable was delayed rejoining operations as she required repairs to her machinery. She departed Manus on 12 July and reached the coast of Japan eight days later. Her aircraft began attacking targets in the Inland Sea on 24 July. Most of the BPF withdrew as planned on 10 August to prepare for Operation Olympic, the invasion of Kyushu scheduled for November, but Indefatigable and several other ships remained to represent Britain at the end of operations. The ship's aircraft flew missions on 13 and 15 August; during the last of these missions, her Seafires shot down eight of twelve Mitsubishi A6M Zeros while losing one of their own and an Avenger gunner shot down another Japanese aircraft. After the ceasefire, her aircraft continued to fly CAP and flew reconnaissance missions looking for Allied prisoners of war.

Indefatigable arrived at Sydney on 18 September and began a leisurely refit that lasted until 15 November. After touring Australia and New Zealand, she arrived at Spithead on 15 March 1946 where she was modified to accommodate over 1,900 passengers. She ferried troops to and from Australia, Ceylon, Singapore and America for the rest of the year before being placed in reserve at the beginning of 1947. The ship was modified for use as a training ship and recommissioned in 1950 for service with the Home Fleet Training Squadron. She was decommissioned at Rosyth in October 1954 and towed to Gareloch in June 1955 where she was listed for disposal. Indefatigable was sold for scrap in September 1956 and subsequently broken up.

== Bibliography ==
- Brown, David (1977). WWII Fact Files: Aircraft Carriers. New York: Arco Publishing. ISBN 0-668-04164-1.
- Campbell, John (1985). Naval Weapons of World War II. Annapolis, Maryland: Naval Institute Press. ISBN 0-87021-459-4.
- Chesneau, Roger (1995). Aircraft Carriers of the World, 1914 to the Present: An Illustrated Encyclopedia (New, Revised ed.). Annapolis, Maryland: Naval Institute Press. ISBN 0-87021-902-2.
- Chesneau, Roger, ed. (1980). Conway's All the World's Fighting Ships 1922–1946. Greenwich, UK: Conway Maritime Press. ISBN 0-85177-146-7.
- Friedman, Norman (1988). British Carrier Aviation: The Evolution of the Ships and Their Aircraft. Annapolis, Maryland: Naval Institute Press. ISBN 0-87021-054-8.
- Hobbs, David (2013). British Aircraft Carriers: Design, Development and Service Histories. Barnsley, UK: Seaforth Publishing. ISBN 978-1-84832-138-0.
- Howe, Stuart (1992). De Havilland Mosquito: An Illustrated History. Bourne End, UK: Aston Publications. ISBN 0-946627-63-0.
- McCart, Neil (2000). The Illustrious & Implacable Classes of Aircraft Carrier 1940–1969. Cheltenham, UK: Fan Publications. ISBN 1-901225-04-6.
- Roberts, John (2000). British Warships of the Second World War. Annapolis, Maryland: Naval Institute Press. ISBN 1-55750-220-X.
- Rohwer, Jürgen (2005). Chronology of the War at Sea 1939–1945: The Naval History of World War Two (Third Rev ed.). Annapolis, Maryland: Naval Institute Press. ISBN 1-59114-119-2.
