= 30th Naval Fighter Wing =

Royal Navy Fleet Air Arm aircraft wing

- White Ensign
- Active: 10 October 1944 – 30 June 1945
- Country: United Kingdom
- Branch: Royal Navy
- Type: Naval fighter Wing
- Role: Carrier-based fighter
- Size: Two squadrons
- Part of: Fleet Air Arm
- Aircraft carrier: HMS Implacable
- Engagements: Second World War: European theatre of World War II; Operation Provident; Pacific War; Operation Inmate

Commanders
- Notable commanders: Lieutenant Commander C.P. Campbell-Horsfall, RN

Insignia
- Wing Code: P

Aircraft flown
- Fighter: Supermarine Seafire

30th Naval Fighter Wing ("30 Wing") was a Fleet Air Arm formation of the Royal Navy during the Second World War. It was formed at RNAS Machrihanish on 10 October 1944 for service aboard HMS Implacable. The wing comprised 801 and 880 Naval Air Squadrons, both equipped with Supermarine Seafire fighter aircraft. It embarked in HMS Implacable in November 1944 and took part in operations off Norway, including Operation Provident, before accompanying the carrier to the British Pacific Fleet in March 1945.

On 30 June 1945, the Fleet Air Arm reorganised its carrier formations into Carrier Air Groups. The 30th Naval Fighter Wing ceased to exist and its two squadrons became part of the newly formed 8th Carrier Air Group aboard HMS Implacable.

== History ==
=== Formation ===
The 30th Naval Fighter Wing was formed at RNAS Machrihanish, Argyll and Bute, on 10 October 1944 for service aboard aboard the name ship of her class HMS Implacable. It consisted of 801 and 880 Naval Air Squadrons, both equipped with Supermarine Seafire fighter aircraft. The wing was part of the Fleet Air Arm's wartime system of grouping naval air squadrons for operations from aircraft carriers.

801 and 880 Squadrons had both operated earlier marks of the Seafire and were intended to form a carrier fighter wing when sufficient Supermarine Seafire Mk.III variant became available. In October 1944 the two squadrons received this mark of Seafire and were brought together for service aboard HMS Implacable.

The formation was part of the Fleet Air Arm's expansion of its carrier fighter force during the latter part of the Second World War. The 30th Wing was one of several numbered naval fighter wings formed around carrier air groups during 1943–45.

=== HMS Implacable ===
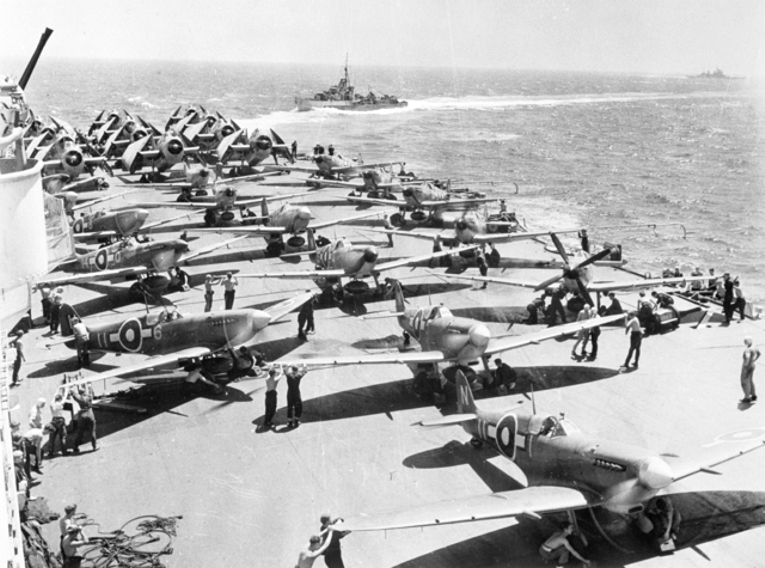
Supermarine Seafires line up on the deck of the aircraft carrier HMS Implacable and warm up their engines before taking off

The wing embarked in HMS Implacable on 8 November 1944. The carrier's previous Fairey Barracuda force was replaced by the Supermarine Seafires of 801 and 880 Squadrons, which subsequently provided fighter cover during operations off the Norwegian coast.

Between 11 and 21 November, the Supermarine Seafires provided cover for minelaying operations conducted by escort carriers off Norway. On 22 November, HMS Implacable sailed for Operation Provident, an operation against German shipping in northern Norway. The carrier's embarked air group included the Supermarine Seafires of 801 and 880 Squadrons and the Fairey Fireflys of 1771 Naval Air Squadron.

Poor weather prevented flying until 27 November, when aircraft from HMS Implacable located and attacked a German convoy. Two merchant ships were sunk and several others damaged. The Supermarine Seafires performed fighter-escort and air-cover duties for the strike aircraft. Contemporary squadron records provide evidence of 880 Squadron Supermarine Seafires being launched as fighter escort for the attack.

Following Operation Provident, HMS Implacable returned to Scapa Flow, Orkney Islands, on 29 November. The carrier subsequently underwent a refit at Rosyth Dockyard, Fife, in preparation for transfer to the British Pacific Fleet.

=== British Pacific Fleet ===
Supermarine Seafire LF Mk.IIIc in the markings of 880 Squadron, when based on HMS Implacable

801 and 880 Squadrons re-embarked in HMS Implacable in March 1945. The carrier sailed from Britain on 16 March to join the British Pacific Fleet and reached Sydney, Australia, on 8 May. HMS Implacable subsequently proceeded to Manus Island, arriving on 29 May.

The carrier's air group included 801 and 880 Squadrons, equipped with Supermarine Seafires, together with 828 Naval Air Squadron, equipped with Grumman Avengers, and 1771 Naval Air Squadron, equipped with Fairey Fireflys.

The two Supermarine Seafire squadrons subsequently operated with HMS Implacable during the British Pacific Fleet's operations against Japan. In June 1945, before the formal end of the wing organisation, 801 and 880 Squadrons took part in Operation Inmate, the British Pacific Fleet's attack on the Japanese naval base at Truk.

By this stage the Fleet Air Arm was preparing to replace its wartime naval fighter-wing organisation with Carrier Air Groups. The 30th Naval Fighter Wing ceased to exist on 30 June 1945, when 801 and 880 Squadrons became part of the 8th Carrier Air Group aboard HMS Implacable.

=== Reorganisation into the 8th Carrier Air Group ===
The Fleet Air Arm reorganised its aircraft carrier formations into Carrier Air Groups on 30 June 1945, following the organisational model adopted for the British Pacific Fleet. The 8th Carrier Air Group was formed for HMS Implacable on that date. Its initial squadrons were 801 and 880 Naval Air Squadrons, flying Supermnarine Seafires, together with 828 Naval Air Squadron, flying Grumman Avengers and 1771 Naval Air Squadron flying Fairey Fireflys.

The reorganisation was therefore not simply a change of name for the 30th Wing. The two Supermarine Seafire squadrons were transferred into a larger carrier air group alongside the carrier's torpedo bomber and reconnaissance/strike squadrons.

The 8th Carrier Air Group subsequently operated from HMS Implacable during the final operations against Japan in July and August 1945.

== Operational record ==
The 30th Naval Fighter Wing had two distinct operational phases. In its first period aboard HMS Implacable in November 1944, its Supermarine Seafire squadrons conducted fighter-cover and escort duties during operations against German forces and shipping off Norway. In its second period, the wing accompanied HMS Implacable to the British Pacific Fleet and its constituent squadrons took part in operations against Japan before the wing organisation was replaced by the 8th Carrier Air Group on 30 June 1945.

The November 1944 operations are significant because they establish that the wing's constituent squadrons were operationally employed before the June 1945 reorganisation. The wing therefore did not cease to exist without its squadrons having undertaken operations, although the sorties themselves were flown by 801 and 880 Naval Air Squadrons rather than by a separate flying unit designated as the wing.

== Squadrons ==
801 and 880 Naval Air Squadrons were the only flying units assigned to the 30th Naval Fighter Wing. Both operated Supermarine Seafires throughout their association with the wing.

- 801 Naval Air Squadron, October 1944 – June 1945
- 880 Naval Air Squadron, October 1944 – June 1945

== Naval air stations and carrier deployments ==
The 30th Naval Fighter Wing operated from Royal Naval Air Stations in the United Kingdom and from the fleet carrier HMS Implacable. The components of the wing were occasionally deployed independently from one another:

HMS Implacable

- Royal Naval Air Station Machrihanish (HMS Landrail), Argyll and Bute — 30 Wing formed on 10 October 1944 for service in HMS Implacable with 801 and 880 Naval Air Squadrons.
  - 801 Naval Air Squadron — 30 Wing formed, 10 October 1944.
  - 880 Naval Air Squadron — 30 Wing formed, 10 October 1944.
- HMS Implacable — 801 and 880 Naval Air Squadrons embarked on 8 November 1944. The Supermarine Seafires subsequently provided fighter cover for minelaying operations off the Norwegian coast between 11 and 21 November. During Operation Provident, launched against German shipping and installations in northern Norway from 22 November, the Supermarine Seafires provided fighter escort and air cover for the carrier's strike aircraft. Poor weather delayed flying until 27 November. HMS Implacable returned to Scapa Flow on 29 November and subsequently underwent a refit at Rosyth Dockyard.
  - 801 Naval Air Squadron — embarked, 8–29 November 1944.
  - 880 Naval Air Squadron — embarked, 8–29 November 1944.
- HMS Implacable — following the carrier's refit, 801 and 880 Naval Air Squadrons re-embarked in March 1945 as part of the carrier's air group for service with the British Pacific Fleet. HMS Implacable sailed from Britain on 16 March, reached Sydney on 8 May and subsequently joined the British Pacific Fleet at Manus on 29 May.
  - 801 Naval Air Squadron — re-embarked, March 1945.
  - 880 Naval Air Squadron — re-embarked, March 1945.
- HMS Implacable — the two Supermarine Seafire squadrons continued to serve aboard HMS Implacable while the 30th Naval Fighter Wing remained in existence. On 14 June 1945 the carrier participated in Operation Inmate against Japanese positions at Truk, with 801 and 880 Naval Air Squadrons providing fighter cover and escort for the carrier's strike aircraft.
  - 801 Naval Air Squadron — Operation Inmate, 14 June 1945.
  - 880 Naval Air Squadron — Operation Inmate, 14 June 1945.
- HMS Implacable — on 30 June 1945 the Fleet Air Arm reorganised its carrier formations into Carrier Air Groups. The 30th Naval Fighter Wing was absorbed into the newly formed 8th Carrier Air Group, with 801 and 880 Naval Air Squadrons continuing as its Seafire component alongside 828 Naval Air Squadron and 1771 Naval Air Squadron.
  - 801 Naval Air Squadron — transferred to 8th Carrier Air Group, 30 June 1945.
  - 880 Naval Air Squadron — transferred to 8th Carrier Air Group, 30 June 1945.

== Aircraft ==
The wing was equipped with the Supermarine Seafire, principally the Seafire Mk.III during its formation and initial carrier deployment. 801 and 880 Squadrons had been among the Fleet Air Arm units awaiting sufficient Seafire Mk.IIIs to form a carrier fighter wing, and both received the type in 1944 before joining HMS Implacable.

- Supermarine Seafire F Mk.III fighter aircraft (1944 - 1945)
- Supermarine Seafire L Mk.III fighter aircraft (1944 - 1945)

== Wing leader ==
The recorded commanding officer of the 30th Naval Fighter Wing:

- Lieutenant Commander C.P. Campbell-Horsfall, RN, from 10 October 1944

Campbell-Horsfall subsequently served in the HMS Implacable group during the British Pacific Fleet operations against Japan. He was awarded the Distinguished Service Cross for his service in air operations against Japan during July and August 1945.

== See also ==
- Fleet Air Arm
- List of aircraft wings of the Royal Navy
- 801 Naval Air Squadron
- 880 Naval Air Squadron
- HMS Implacable
- 8th Carrier Air Group
- Supermarine Seafire
