= 1790 Naval Air Squadron =

Inactive flying squadron of the Royal Navy's Fleet Air Arm

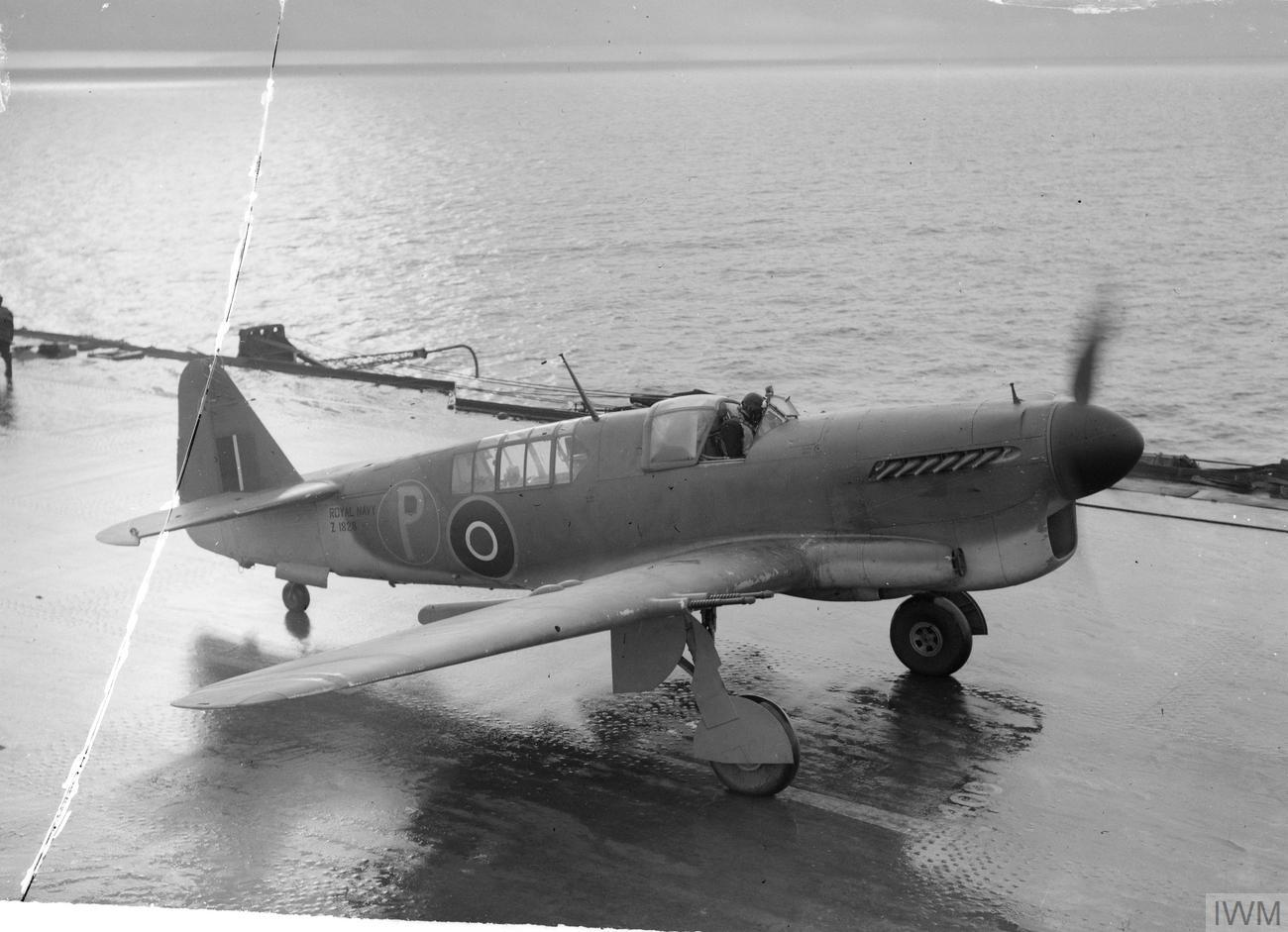
- Fairey Firefly; an example of the type used by 1790 NAS
- Active: 1945–1946
- Disbanded: 3 June 1946
- Country: United Kingdom
- Branch: Royal Navy
- Type: Two-seat fighter squadron
- Role: Night fighter
- Size: Squadron
- Part of: Fleet Air Arm
- Home station: See Naval air stations section for full list.

Commanders
- Notable commanders: Lieutenant Commander(A) J.H Kneale, RNVR

Insignia
- Identification Markings: 4A+ 282-298 (later on)

Aircraft flown
- Fighter: Fairey Firefly

1790 Naval Air Squadron (1790 NAS), sometimes called 1790 Squadron, is an inactive Fleet Air Arm (FAA) naval air squadron of the United Kingdom's Royal Navy (RN). It was formed on 1 January 1945 at RNAS Burscough, (HMS Ringtail), Lancashire, as a night fighter squadron. It was initially equipped with the Fairey Firefly I fighter aircraft, replaced in May 1945 by the Firefly NF.Mk I night fighter, which was fitted with a US-derived ASV radar. The squadron joined the Nairana-class escort carrier HMS Vindex on 24 June, bound for Australia, with the ship arriving at HMS Nabthorpe, the Mobile Naval Air Base at RAAF Station Schofields, two days before the war in the Far East ended. The squadron was disbanded on 3 June 1946 at Devonport.

== History ==
=== Night Fighter Squadron (1945–1946) ===
1790 Naval Air Squadron formed at RNAS Burscough (HMS Ringtail), Lancashire, England, on 1 January 1945, as a night fighter squadron. It was initially equipped with Fairey Firefly I, a carrier-borne fighter, anti-submarine and reconnaissance aircraft. These were replaced with the NF.Mk I night fighter variant during May, which was fitted with radar in a centre-line container.

Around the end of May / beginning of June the squadron was embarked in the Ruler-class escort carrier HMS Puncher for deck landing practice and later it embarked in the Nairana-class escort carrier HMS Vindex for passage to Australia. It arrived in Australia two days before the end of the second world war, disembarking for RNAS Schofields (HMS Nabstock), New South Wales, on 13 August 1945, with V-J Day on 15 August.

In January 1790 Naval Air Squadron embarked on the name ship of her class HMS Implacable, replacing the Fairey Firefly equipped 1771 Naval Air Squadron within the 8th Carrier Air Group. It disembarked from the carrier on 28 March to RNAS Schofields remaining there for around one month, however, it was one of the last front-line units to depart the airbase along with 801 Naval Air Squadron when they both re-joined HMS Implacable for passage to the United Kingdom on 29 April.

Upon arrival at Devonport, 1790 Naval Air Squadron disbanded on 3 June 1936.

== Aircraft flown ==
1790 Naval Air Squadron flew only one aircraft type, two variants:

- Fairey Firefly I fighter and anti-submarine aircraft (January - May 1945)
- Fairey Firefly NF.Mk I night fighter (May 1945 - April 1946)

== Naval air stations ==
1790 Naval Air Squadron operated from a naval air stations of the Royal Navy in the United Kingdom, one in Australia and a Royal Navy aircraft carrier and a couple of escort carriers:

- Royal Naval Air Station Burscough (HMS Ringtail), Lancashire, (1 January - 24 June 1945)
  - HMS Puncher, Ruler-class escort carrier, (Deck Landing Practice (DLP) 25 May - 5 June 1945)
- HMS Vindex, Nairana-class escort carrier, (24 June - 13 August 1945)
- Royal Naval Air Station Schofields (HMS Nabthorpe/HMS Nabstock), New South Wales, (13 August 1945 - 16 January 1946)
- HMS Implacable, Implacable-class aircraft carrier, (16 January - 28 March 1946)
- Royal Naval Air Station Schofields (HMS Nabstock), New South Wales, (28 March - 29 April 1946)
- HMS Implacable, Implacable-class aircraft carrier, (29 April - 3 June 1946)
- disbanded - United Kingdom (3 June 1946)

== Commanding officers ==
List of commanding officers of 1790 Naval Air Squadron with date of appointment:

- Lieutenant Commander(A) J.H. Kneale, RNVR, from 1 January 1945
- Lieutenant Commander(A) B.C. Lyons, RNVR, from 9 November 1945
- disbanded - 3 June 1946

Note: Abbreviation (A) signifies Air Branch of the RN or RNVR.
