= HMS Zephyr (R19) =

1942 Z-class destroyer of the Royal Navy

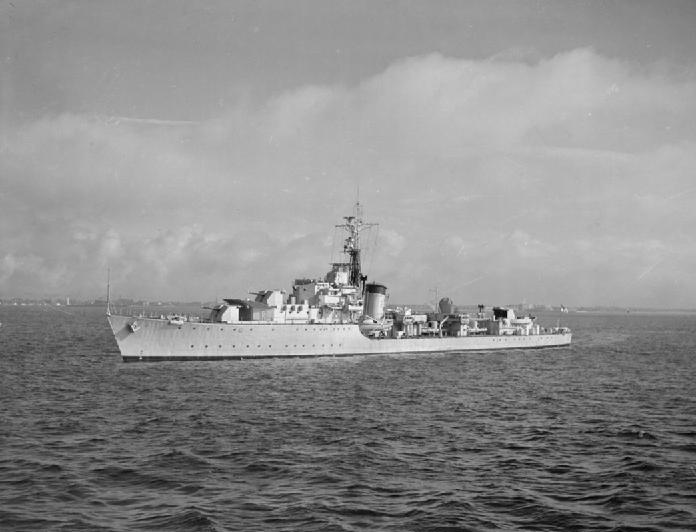
- HMS Zephyr underway off Spithead, 5 May 1952

History

United Kingdom
- Name: HMS Zephyr
- Ordered: 12 February 1942
- Builder: Vickers-Armstrongs, High Walker
- Laid down: 13 July 1942
- Launched: 15 July 1943
- Commissioned: 6 September 1944
- Identification: Pennant number R19
- Honours and awards: Quebec 1759 – Martinique 1762 – Copenhagen 1801 – Baltic 1854 – Arctic 1945
- Fate: Arrived in Dunston for breaking up 2 July 1958
- Badge: On a Field Blue, a representation of Zephyrus, the West wind

General characteristics
- Class & type: Z-class destroyer
- Displacement: 1,710 tons
- Length: 362 ft 9 in (110.57 m)
- Beam: 35 ft 8 in (10.87 m)
- Draught: 10 ft (3.0 m)
- Propulsion: Twin steam turbines
- Speed: 37 knots (69 km/h) maximum
- Complement: 185
- Armament: 4 × QF 4.5-inch (113 mm) guns; 5 × 40 mm Bofors guns; 8 × 21-inch (533 mm) torpedo tubes

HMS Zephyr was a Z-class destroyer. She was launched on 13 July 1942 at Vickers-Armstrongs' High Walker shipyard and commissioned on 6 September 1944. She was 'adopted' by the civil community of Doncaster, replacing the destroyer HMS Lightning (sunk in 1943), which had originally been adopted during Warship Week in 1942.

== Design and construction ==
The Z-class were War Emergency Programme destroyers, intended for general duties, including use as anti-submarine escort, and were to be suitable for mass-production. They were based on the hull and machinery of the pre-war J-class destroyers, but with a lighter armament (effectively whatever armament was available) in order to speed production. The Z-class of eight ships formed the 10th Emergency Flotilla, one of five flotillas of War Emergency destroyers ordered under the 1941 War Construction Programme (the U, V, W, Z and Ca-classes (40 destroyers)).

The Z-class were 362 feet 9 inches (110.57 m) long overall, 348 feet 0 inches (106.07 m) at the waterline and 339 feet 6 inches (103.48 m) between perpendiculars, with a beam of 35 feet 8 inches (10.87 m) and a draught of 10 feet 0 inches (3.05 m) mean and 14 feet 3 inches (4.34 m) full load. Displacement was 1,710 long tons (1,740 t) standard and 2,530 long tons (2,570 t) full load. Two Admiralty 3-drum water-tube boilers supplied steam at 300 pounds per square inch (2,100 kPa) and 630 °F (332 °C) to two sets of Parsons single-reduction geared steam turbines, which drove two propeller shafts. The machinery was rated at 40,000 shaft horsepower (30,000 kW) giving a maximum speed of 36 knots (41 mph; 67 km/h) and 32 knots (37 mph; 59 km/h) at full load. 615 tons of oil were carried, giving a range of 4,675 nautical miles (5,380 mi; 8,658 km) at 20 knots (23 mph; 37 km/h).

The ship had a main gun armament of four 4.5-inch (120 mm) QF Mk. IV guns, capable of elevating to an angle of 55 degrees, giving a degree of anti-aircraft capability, with the Z-class being the first class of destroyers to use the new gun. The close-in anti-aircraft armament was one Hazemayer stabilised twin mount for the Bofors 40 mm gun, and six Oerlikon 20 mm cannons (two twin and two single mounts, which was later modified by replacing the Oerlikon cannon with four single 2-pounder (40 mm) "pom-pom" autocannon. Two quadruple mount for 21-inch (533 mm) torpedoes was fitted, while the ship had a depth charge outfit of four depth charge mortars and two racks, with a total of 70 charges carried. She had a crew of 179 officers and other ranks.

Zephyr was ordered on 10 February 1942, and was laid down at Vickers-Armstrongs' Walker, Tyneside shipyard on 13 July 1942. She was launched on 15 July 1943 and completed on 6 September 1944.

== Second World War ==
Following commissioning, Zephyr worked up at Scapa Flow and then joined the 2nd Destroyer Flotilla of the Home Fleet in October 1944. As part of an offensive against German shipping (and in particular ships carrying Iron ore) passing through Norwegian coastal waters, Zephyr screened the escort carriers Campania and Trumpeter as their aircraft laid mines near Ålesund and attacked German-operated radio stations from 24 October to 4 November 1944. On 14 November, Zephyr was part of the escort for the carrier Pursuer during a sweep off Trondheim, during which Pursuer's aircraft sank the German patrol boat V6413 was sunk. On 27 November Zephyr was part of the escort for the carrier Implacable during Operation Provident as the carrier's aircraft attacked a convoy off Mosjøen. Two freighters, the Rigel and Korsnes were sunk from the convoy as well as the German freighter Spree which was lying at anchor. Over 2300 men, including large numbers of Soviet prisoners of war, were killed by the sinking of Rigel. On 14 December Zephyr was part of the escort for the carriers Premier and Trumpeter and the cruiser Devonshire when the force was spotted by a German reconnaissance aircraft. In response, the Germans launched a 30-aircraft strong torpedo-bomber strike, but it failed to find the British force.

During anti-submarine operations on 31 December 1944 Zephyr was damaged in an explosion off of the Pentland Firth, due to either a torpedo from the submarine U-1020, or a mine. The aft boiler room was flooded and the ship temporarily lost steam and electrical power. After all torpedoes and upper-deck depth charges were jettisoned to reduce topweight, Zephyr made it to port. One of her crew was killed. After inspection and temporary repair at Scapa Flow, permanent repairs were made by Caledon Shipbuilding at their Dundee yard from 8 January to 12 April 1945. On 18 April she joined the escort of Arctic convoy JW 66. The convoy was not attacked during its journey to Russia, but there was a strong force of U-boats off the entrance to the Kola Inlet, where sonar conditions made the submarines difficult to detect. To counter this, the escort laid down a blind barrage of depth charges when it arrived at the Kola Inlet on 25 April to force the convoy past the U-boat patrol line, this preventing the U-boats from attacking the convoy. The return convoy, Convoy RA 66, set out from the Kola Inlet on 29 April, with Zephyr forming part of its escort until 7 May. Two submarines (U-307 and U-286 were sunk by the escort, while the frigate Goodall was sunk by a U-boat. The merchant ships of the convoy were unharmed. As the war reached its end Zephyr stopped at Copenhagen with other Royal Navy ships on 9 May to accept the surrender of a number of German warships, including the cruiser Prinz Eugen. In June and July she undertook occupation duties at Wilhelmshaven and Kiel. Zephyr was refitted at Portsmouth from 23 July to 8 September, having her fire control director tower fitted, and took part in Operation Deadlight, the scuttling of surrendered German U-boats in November–December 1945.

== Postwar ==
Between August 1946 and May 1947 Zephyr was part of the 4th Destroyer Flotilla as part of the Home Fleet. Between July 1947 and February 1948 the destroyer was with the Portsmouth Flotilla as Gunnery ship. In February 1948 she transferred to the 3rd Escort Flotilla, based at Portland. In February 1949 she was leader of the 2nd Training Flotilla. On 28 February 1952, Zephyr collided with the submarine rescue ship Reclaim and on 13 June that year collided with the submarine Sleuth and was holed below the waterline. She was relieved as gunnery ship by Vigilant by March 1953. It was planned to convert Zephyr to a Type 15 frigate, but this was cancelled due to the poor physical condition of the ship, with extensive corrosion. In June 1953 she attended the Coronation Review at Spithead.

She was paid-off to reserve status in the Portsmouth Reserve Fleet in December 1953. In November 1956, Zephyr was offered for sale to Peru, but the offer was not accepted.

== Disposal ==
Zephyr was transferred to BISCO for disposal on 27 June 1958, and arrived at the shipbreaking company Clayton and Davie's yard at Dunston on 2 July 1958 for scrapping.

== Publications ==
- Blair, Clay (2000). Hitler's U-Boat War: The Hunted 1942–1945. New York: Modern Library. ISBN 0-679-64033-9.
- Colledge, J. J.; Warlow, Ben (2006) [1969]. Ships of the Royal Navy: The Complete Record of All Fighting Ships of the Royal Navy from the 15th Century to the Present (3rd Rev ed.). London: Chatham Publishing. ISBN 978-1-86176-281-8. OCLC 67375475.
- Critchley, Mike (1982). British Warships Since 1945: Part 3: Destroyers. Liskeard, UK: Maritime Books. ISBN 0-9506323-9-2.
- English, John (2008). Obdurate to Daring: British Fleet Destroyers 1941–45. Windsor, UK: World Ship Society. ISBN 978-0-9560769-0-8.
- Friedman, Norman (2008). British Destroyers & Frigates: The Second World War and After. Barnsley, UK: Seaforth Publishing. ISBN 978-1-84832-015-4.
- Gardiner, Robert; Chesneau, Roger, eds. (1980). Conway's All The World's Fighting Ships 1922–1946. London: Conway Maritime Press. ISBN 0-85177-146-7.
- H.M. Ships Damaged or Sunk by Enemy Action: 3rd. SEPT. 1939 to 2nd. SEPT. 1945. Admiralty. 1952.
- Marriott, Leo (1989). Royal Navy Destroyers Since 1945. Ian Allan Ltd. ISBN 0-7110-1817-0.
- Lenton, H. T. (1970). Navies of the Second World War: British Fleet & Escort Destroyers Volume Two. London: Macdonald & Co. ISBN 0-356-03122-5.
- Raven, Alan; Roberts, John (1978). War Built Destroyers O to Z Classes. London: Bivouac Books. ISBN 0-85680-010-4.
- Rohwer, Jürgen; Hümmelchen, Gerhard (1992). Chronology of the War at Sea 1939–1945. London: Greenhill Books. ISBN 1-85367-117-7.
- Roskill, S. W. (1961). The War at Sea 1939–1945: Volume III The Offensive Part II, 1st June 1944 –14th August 1945. History of the Second World War: United Kingdom Military Series. London: Her Majesty's Stationery Office.
- Ruegg, Bob; Hague, Arnold (1993). Convoys to Russia 1941–1945. Kendal, UK: World Ship Society. ISBN 0-905617-66-5.
- Whitley, M. J. (1988). Destroyers of World War 2. Annapolis, MD: Naval Institute Press. ISBN 0-87021-326-1.
- Whitley, M. J. (2000). Destroyers of World War 2: An International Encyclopedia. London: Cassell & Co. ISBN 1-85409-521-8.
