= 880 Naval Air Squadron =

Non-operational flying squadron of the Royal Navy's Fleet Air Arm and Royal Canadian Navy

880 Naval Air Squadron VS 880 MR 880
- 880 NAS badge
- Active: Royal Navy; 15 January 1941–11 September 1945; Royal Canadian Navy; 1 May 1951–1990 (ceased operating)
- Country: United Kingdom; Canada
- Branch: Royal Navy; Royal Canadian Navy
- Type: Single-seat fighter squadron
- Role: Carrier-based fighter squadron
- Size: squadron
- Part of: Fleet Air Arm
- Aircraft: See Aircraft operated section for full list.
- Engagements: World War II: Operation Ironclad; Operation Torch; Operation Husky; Operation Avalanche; Operation Tungsten; Operation Inmate
- Battle honours: Diego Suarez 1942; North Africa 1942; Sicily 1943; Salerno 1943; Norway 1944; Japan 1945

880 Naval Air Squadron was a Royal Navy Fleet Air Arm aircraft carrier-based squadron formed in January 1941. The squadron served throughout the Second World War being embarked in the carriers HMS Furious, Indomitable, Argus and Implacable serving off East Africa, in the Mediterranean, off Norway and in the Far East. It was disbanded on 11 September 1945 at Schofields, Sydney, Australia.

The squadron was reformed on 1 May 1951 as a carrier-based anti-submarine squadron in the Royal Canadian Navy. It was redesignated VS 880, (Note: Canadian naval squadron designations are correctly written with a space rather than a hyphen, unlike the otherwise similar US Navy designations.) in 1952. After the decommissioning of HMCS Bonaventure, Canada's last aircraft carrier in 1970, the squadron transferred to shore based inshore anti-submarine operations, and in 1973 changed role again to protection of Canada's Exclusive Economic Zone, this changing the squadron's designation to MR 880. It ceased operations in April 1990 when its aircraft were retired.

== Royal Navy ==
The squadron was first formed as a fighter squadron of the Fleet Air Arm on 15 January 1941 at RNAS Arbroath in Scotland. It was initially equipped with a mix of aircraft, including Grumman Martlets, Gloster Sea Gladiators and Hawker Sea Hurricane Ias, before settling on the carrier-compatible Sea Hurricane Ib in July that year. On 21 July, a flight of four Hurricanes from the squadron embarked on the carrier Furious to take part in a raid on the ports of Kirkenes in Norway and Petsamo in Finland. The Hurricanes took part in the attack on Petsamo on 30 July, and on 31 July, one of the flight's Hurricanes shot down a German aircraft shadowing the British force. (Note: The aircraft shot down was a Focke-Wulf Fw 200 Condor according to Thetford and a Dornier Do 18 flying boat according to Sturtivant and Ballance.) In October that year, the complete squadron embarked aboard the newly completed carrier Indomitable, which was allocated to the Far East. In January 1942, 48 crated RAF Hurricanes were loaded aboard Indomitable at Durban, South Africa, for delivery to the East Indies. While these aircraft were accompanied by RAF ground crew, who were intended to ready the Hurricanes for flight, few of the RAF personnel had any experience of working on Hurricanes and the task of assembling the aircraft passed to 880 Squadron, with the Hurricanes being flown off Indomitable on 27 January.

In May 1942, the squadron took part in the invasion of Madagascar, being largely employed in ground attack duties during the capture of Diego-Suarez at the start of the invasion, and destroying one light aircraft by strafing at Arrachart airfield, leaving air superiority duties to the Martlets of 881 and 882 Squadrons operating off Illustrious. In July 1942, Indomitable, with 880 Squadron aboard, returned to Britain to prepare for Operation Pedestal, a plan to run a convoy carrying vital fuel, supplies and food to besieged Malta. The squadron claimed eight German and Italian aircraft shot down and three more damaged during Pedestal, for a loss of three aircraft, while Indomitable was badly damaged by German bombs on 12 August. Four of the squadron's pilots were killed either in the air or when Indomitable was bombed.

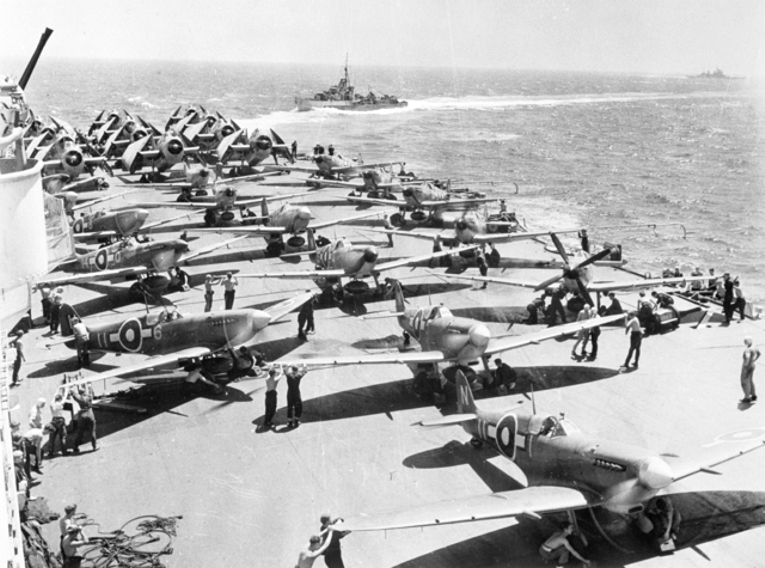
Seafires of 880 and 801 Squadrons aboard HMS Implacable in 1945. Grumman Avenger torpedo bombers are ranged at the aft end of the ship's flight deck

After Indomitable's return to Britain later that month, 880 Squadron re-equipped with Supermarine Seafires, joining Argus in October 1942 as Indomitable was still under repair. In November, the squadron took part in Operation Torch, the Anglo-American invasion of French North-West Africa, operating in support of the landings at Algiers. In March 1943, the squadron re-embarked on Indomitable, with the carrier part of the covering force protecting the Allied invasion of Sicily from any intervention by Italian naval forces in July 1943. Indomitable was damaged during the Sicily operations, and in August, 880 Squadron joined the Escort carrier Stalker, helping to provide a Combat Air Patrol over the landings at Salerno, Italy, in September 1943.

In February 1944, the Squadron embarked aboard Furious for operations off Norway, continuing operations off that carrier until September that year, taking part in Operation Tungsten, an attack against the German battleship Tirpitz on 3 April 1944. In November the squadron embarked aboard Implacable, which took part in operations off Norway in November and December that year. In March 1945, the squadron was on board Implacable as the carrier left Britain on passage to join the British Pacific Fleet. In June 1945, 880 Squadron took part in Operation Inmate, an attack on the isolated Japanese base at Truk atoll by Implacable and supporting ships. Implacable's Seafires (from 880 and 801 Squadrons) dive-bombed oil tanks and spotted for the cruisers of the task force as they shelled targets on the atoll. In July–August 1945, Implacable's air wing, including 880 Squadron, (with the squadron's Seafires now fitted with drop tanks to increase range), took part in strikes against the Japanese home islands. The squadron was disbanded at HMS Nabthorpe, situated RAAF Station Schofields, near Sydney, Australia, on 11 September 1945, when it was merged with 801 Squadron.

== Canada ==
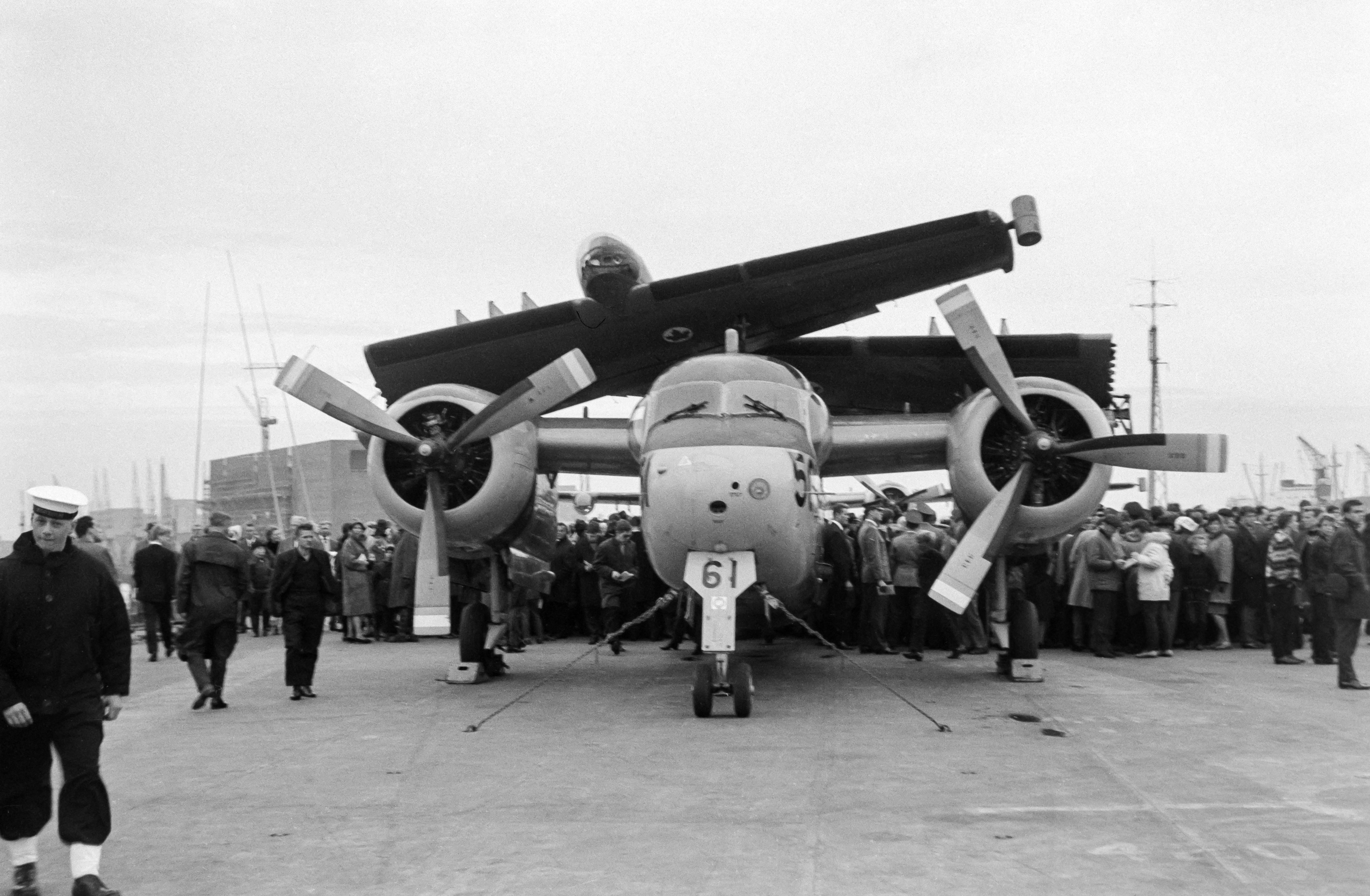
A VS 880 Tracker aboard HMCS Bonaventure in 1966

The squadron was re-formed as an anti-submarine squadron of the Royal Canadian Navy on 1 May 1951, when, as part of a renumbering of Commonwealth Naval Air Squadrons, 825 Squadron, based at HCMS Shearwater, a Canadian Naval airbase at Dartmouth, Nova Scotia and equipped with Fairey Firefly AS.5s, was renumbered 880 Squadron. The squadron, which regularly deployed aboard the carrier Magnificent, re-equipped with Grumman TBM-3E Avengers and was renamed VS 880 following the USN naming convention in November 1952. In September 1957, VS 880 first embarked on Canada's new carrier, Bonaventure, and the squadron began to re-equip with Grumman CS2F-1 Trackers in October 1957, flying its last flight with the Avenger on 13 December that year. On 7 July 1959, the Tracker-equipped VS 881 merged with VS 880, leaving the enlarged VS 880 with a complement of 24 Trackers and 450 personnel. From January 1960, the squadron received CS2F-2 Trackers, with improved sensors, to replace its CS2F-1s, which were discarded by the end of December that year.

On 1 February 1968, VS 880 joined the newly established Canadian Armed Forces as the Royal Canadian Navy was merged with the Canadian Army and the Royal Canadian Air Force. Bonaventure was decommissioned without replacement on 3 July 1970, with VS 880 carrying out its last flight from the carrier on 12 December. With the demise of Bonaventure, VS 880 was transferred to shore-based inshore anti-submarine operations, with its Trackers receiving the new designation of CP-121 on 27 July 1970. In December 1973, Canada declared a 200 nmi (230 mi; 370 km) Exclusive Economic Zone (EEZ), and the squadron's role was changed to protecting the EEZ, which resulted in the squadron being re-designated MR 880, and anti-submarine systems being removed from its Trackers. Duties included fisheries protectionpollution and wildlife surveys and ice patrols over Canada's Arctic coasts, with the aircraft receiving new radar and communications equipment in 1978, and adding the ability to carry CRV7 rockets from 1982. It moved to CFB Summerside on Prince Edward Island in 1981. Late-1980s' plans to upgrade Canada's Trackers with turboprop engines were abandoned, and the fisheries protection role was privatised, leading to the squadron's Trackers being retired in April 1990. The squadron has never been officially disbanded and still exists as a "zero strength" unit.

== Aircraft operated ==
The squadron has operated a number of different aircraft types when under the command of the Royal Navy, then subsequently the Royal Canadian Navy, including:

=== Royal Navy ===
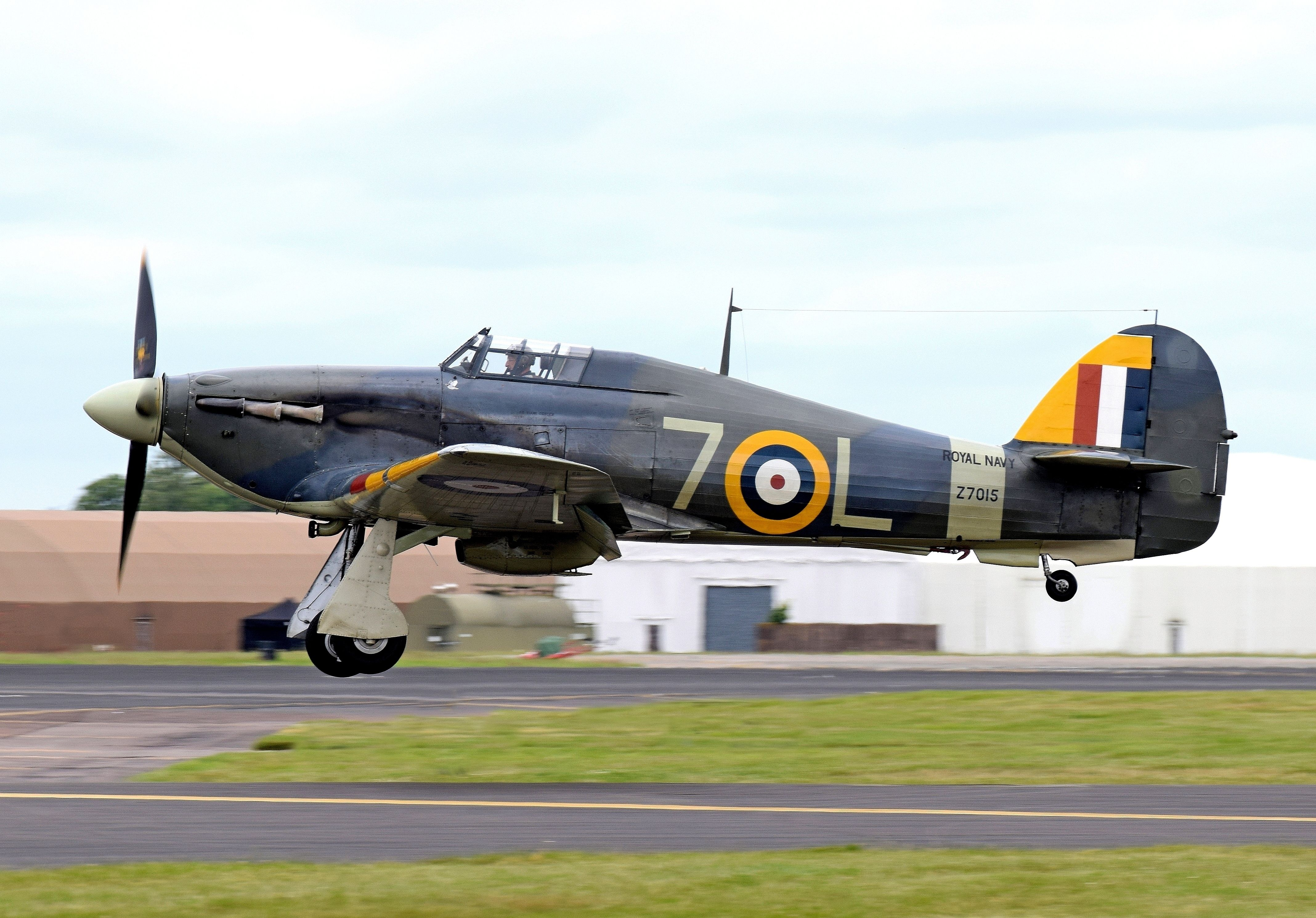
Hawker Sea Hurricane Mk Ib (Royal Navy code 7-L and Z7015), in the Fleet Air Arm colours of 880 squadron

- Grumman Martlet Mk I fighter aircraft (January - February 1941)
- Gloster Sea Gladiator fighter aircraft (February - June 1941)
- Hawker Sea Hurricane Mk la fighter aircraft (March - July 1941)
- Hawker Sea Hurricane Mk Ib fighter aircraft (July 1941 - August 1942)
- Supermarine Spitfire Mk Vb fighter aircraft (August 1942 - February 1943)
- Supermarine Seafire F Mk.IIc fighter aircraft (September 1942 - August 1943)
- Supermarine Seafire L Mk.IIc fighter aircraft (August 1943 - March 1944)
- Supermarine Spitfire Mk I fighter aircraft (November 1943 - January 1944)
- Supermarine Seafire F Mk.III fighter aircraft (March 1944 - February 1945)
- Supermarine Seafire L Mk.III fighter aircraft (February - September 1945)

=== Royal Canadian Navy ===
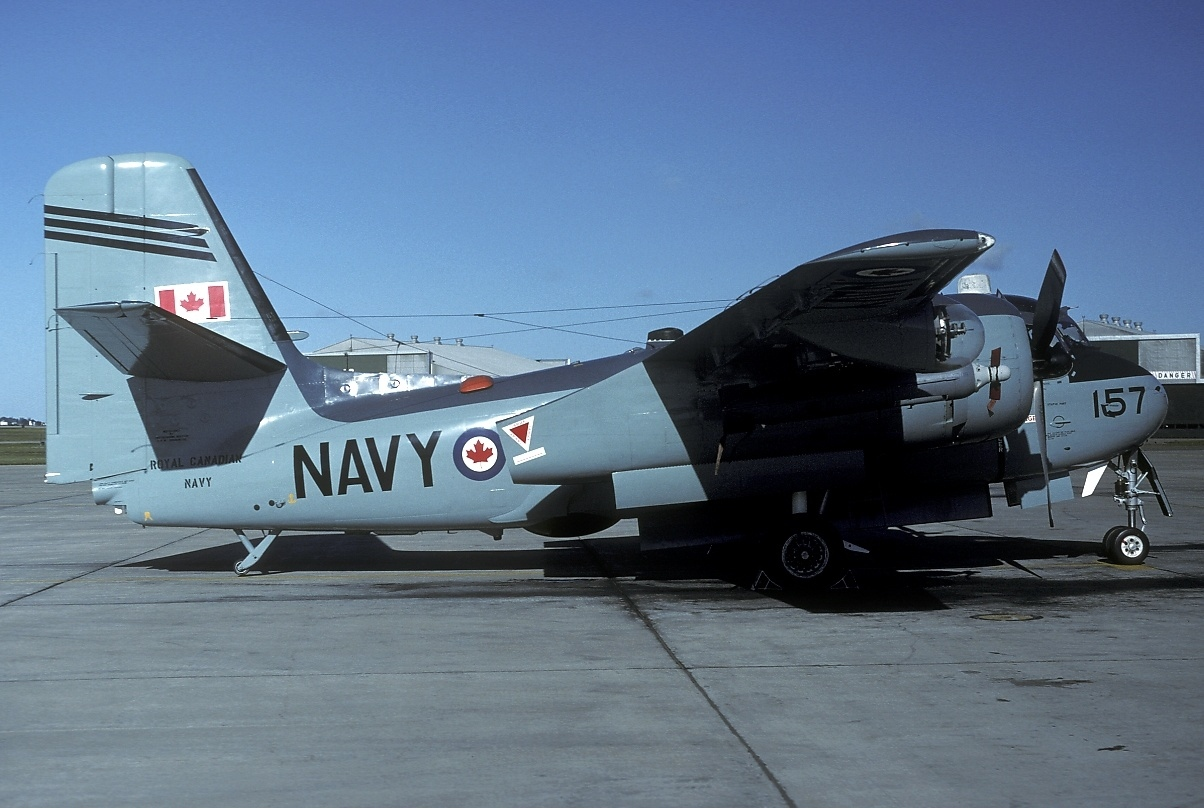
de Havilland Canada Tracker, MR 880 squadron

- Fairey Firefly AS.Mk 5 anti-submarine aircraft (May - November 1951)
- Grumman Avenger AS3 anti-submarine aircraft (November 1951 - December 1957)
- Grumman Avenger Mk.3W2 airborne early warning and control (AEW&C) and relay platform (March 1957 - March 1959)
- de Havilland Canada (Grumman) CS2F Tracker CS2F-1 anti-submarine warfare aircraft (October 1957 - February 1960)
- de Havilland Canada (Grumman) CS2F Tracker CS2F-2 anti-submarine warfare aircraft (January 1960 - July 1967)
- de Havilland Canada (Grumman) CS2F Tracker CS2F-3 anti-submarine warfare aircraft (November 1966 - March 1990)

== Battle honours ==
The battle honours awarded to 880 Naval Air Squadron are:

- Diego Suarez 1942
- North Africa 1942
- Sicily 1943
- Salerno 1943
- Norway 1944
- Japan 1945

== Assignments ==
880 Naval Air Squadron was assigned as needed to form part of a number of larger units:

- 30th Naval Fighter Wing (10 October 1943 - 30 June 1945)
- 8th Carrier Air Group (30 June - 11 September 1945)

== Commanding officers ==
=== Royal Navy ===
List of commanding officers of 880 Naval Air Squadron.

- Lieutenant Commander F.E.C. Judd, RN, from 15 January 1941
- Lieutenant G.R. Callingham, RN, from 17 July 1941
- Lieutenant(A) W.H. Martyn, RN, from 5 September 1941
- Lieutenant Commander F.E.C. Judd, RN, from 11 October 1941 (KiA 12 August 1942)
- Lieutenant Commander(A) R.J. Cork, DSC, RN, from 12 August 1942
- Lieutenant Commander(A) W.H. Martyn, DSC, RN, from 7 September 1942
- Lieutenant Commander(A) R.M. Crosley, DSC & Bar, RNVR, from 5 August 1944
- disbanded - 11 September 1945

Note: Abbreviation (A) signifies Air Branch of the RN or RNVR.

=== Royal Canadian Navy ===
List of commanding officers of 880 Squadron RCN, VS 880 and MR 880:

- Lieutenant-commander D.W. Knox, RCN, from 1 May 1951
- Lieutenant(N) E.M. Davis, RCN, from 21 November 1951 (Lieutenant-commander 5 September 1952)
- Lieutenant-commander F.G. Townsend, RCN, from 15 March 1954
- Lieutenant-commander J. Lewry, CD, RCN, from 17 January 1956
- Lieutenant-commander H.D. Buchanan, CD, RCN, from 13 September 1957 (Commander 1 July 1959)
- Commander W.J. Walton, CD, RCN, from 18 February 1960
- Commander D.M. MacLeod, RCN, from 7 August 1961
- Commander R.C. MacLean, RCN, 3 June 1963
- Commander R.A.R. Laidler, CD, RCN, from 10 September 1965
- Commander R.L. Hughes, CD, RCN, from 13 December 1967
- Lieutenant-Colonel (Commander) D.H. Tate, CD, CF, from 4 August 1969
- ceased to be an Aircraft Carrier squadron 1 November 1969
