= Operation Inmate =

World War II attack against Japanese positions on Truk Atoll

- Part of the Pacific War and World War II
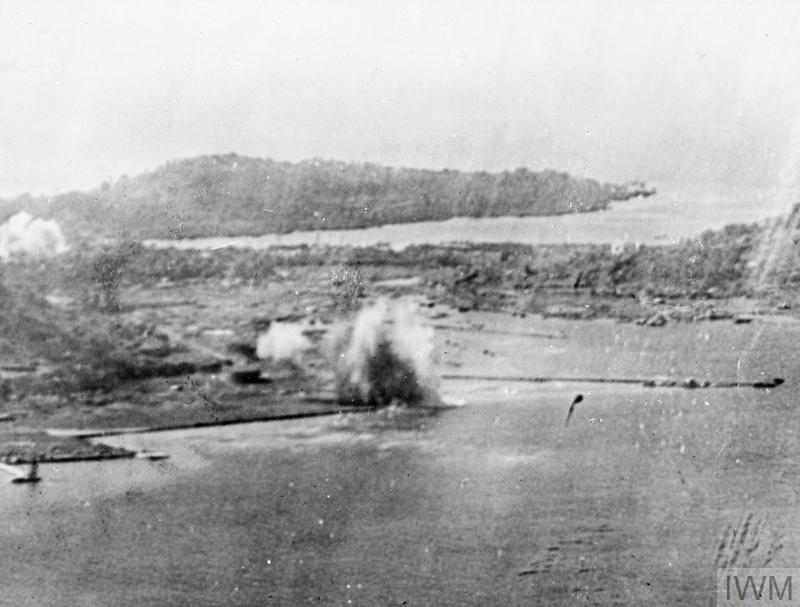
- Shells from a British Pacific Fleet cruiser falling on Japanese oil tanks at Truk during the 15 June 1945 bombardment
Date	14–15 June 1945
Location	Truk 7.3393°N 151.8846°E
Result	Allied victory

Belligerents
United Kingdom; Canada; New Zealand; United States	Japan

Commanders and leaders
(United Kingdom) E. J. P. Brind	(Empire of Japan) Shunzaburo Mugikura (Empire of Japan) Chuichi Hara

Casualties and losses
2 killed 1 aircraft destroyed in combat 6 aircraft destroyed in accidents	Damage to airfields and other infrastructure 2 aircraft believed destroyed

Operation Inmate was an attack by the British Pacific Fleet against Japanese positions on Truk Atoll in the central Pacific Ocean during the Second World War. The attacks against the isolated islands on 14 and 15 June 1945 were conducted to provide combat experience for the aircraft carrier HMS Implacable and several of the fleet's cruisers and destroyers ahead of their involvement in more demanding operations off the Japanese home islands.

On 14 June 1945 British aircraft conducted a series of raids against Japanese positions at Truk. The next morning, several islands were bombarded by British and Canadian cruisers, though only one of the four warships involved achieved any success. Further airstrikes took place in the afternoon and night of 15 June before the Allied force returned to its base.

The attack on Truk was considered successful for the Allied force, with the ships and air units gaining useful experience while suffering two fatalities and the loss of seven aircraft to combat and accidents. The damage to the Japanese facilities in the atoll, which had been repeatedly attacked during 1944 and 1945, was modest.

== Background ==
The British Pacific Fleet (BPF) was formed in November 1944 as Britain's main contribution to Allied operations against Japanese positions in the Pacific. The Fleet's base was established at Sydney, Australia, and most of its ships arrived there in February 1945. From late March to late May 1945, aircraft flying from the BPF's four fleet carriers frequently attacked Japanese airfields on islands to the south of Okinawa to support the United States military forces which were attempting to capture the island. These operations concluded on 24 May, when the Fleet began the long journey back to Naval Base Sydney for a period of rest and maintenance.

The fleet carrier HMS Implacable was dispatched from the United Kingdom in February 1945 to reinforce the BPF. The ship arrived at Sydney on 8 May. On 24 May Implacable departed Sydney, and reached the BPF's forward base at Manus Island five days later. The main body of the BPF arrived at Naval Base Manus to refuel on 30 May, and most of its ships continued to Sydney on 1 June. Implacable remained at Manus, which she and her air group used as a base for intensive training. As part of the preparations for the BPF's return to combat the commander of the fleet's combat force, Vice-Admiral Bernard Rawlings, decided at around this time to dispatch Implacable and several other recently arrived warships to attack the Japanese positions at Truk. The purpose of this operation was to ensure that the warships' crews had recent combat experience before the BPF commenced operations off Japan during July. Rawlings' initial orders for the attack specified that it was to involve two days of air strikes against Japanese airfields. The crews of the ships involved, including Implacable's aircraft pilots, were not told that the main purpose of the operation was training.

During the early years of the Pacific War, Truk Atoll in the Caroline Islands had been an important base for the Imperial Japanese Navy (IJN), using facilities which had been constructed there before the outbreak of hostilities. However, it was isolated by the rapid Allied advances in the Pacific during 1943 and early 1944, and ceased to be a significant base after being heavily attacked by the United States Navy's Fast Carrier Task Force during Operation Hailstone in February 1944. Nevertheless, the facilities at Truk could have potentially been used to raid the important Allied facilities which had been established in the Mariana Islands or the major US Navy anchorage at Ulithi. To prevent the islands from being used for this purpose, they were repeatedly attacked by US Navy aircraft carriers which were preparing to join the Fast Carrier Task Force and United States Army Air Forces heavy bomber units; like the British operation in June 1945, these raids were conducted to provide combat experience for the American airmen. The Japanese forces at Truk conscripted local civilians to rapidly repair the damage caused to airfields by these raids. The garrison's anti-aircraft units also fired upon all of the raids, though the scale of this resistance decreased over time.

== Opposing forces ==
In mid-1945 the Japanese garrison at Truk remained large, but had no offensive capacity. As of May that year, the garrison comprised around 13,600 Imperial Japanese Army personnel commanded by Lieutenant General Shunzaburo Mugikura and 10,600 IJN personnel under Vice Admiral Chuichi Hara. A large number of coastal artillery batteries and anti-aircraft guns protected the islands, but no warships and only a small number of aircraft were stationed there. Radar stations on the islands provided warning of most incoming raids. The Japanese forces regarded Truk's air defences as inadequate even before the start of the Allied bombardment of the atoll.

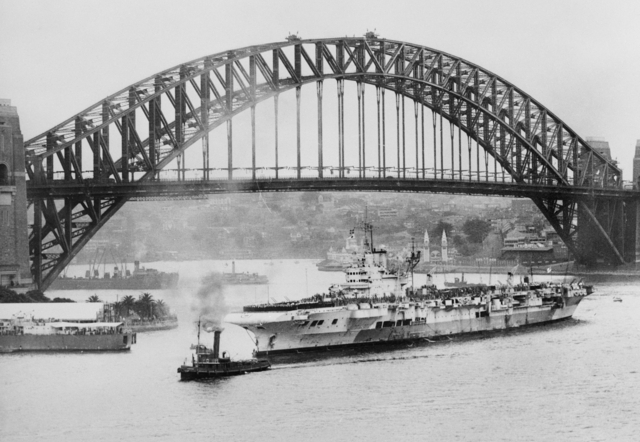
HMS Implacable arriving at Sydney on 8 May 1945

The Truk garrison received few shipments of reinforcements or supplies following the capture of the Palau islands by US forces in September 1944. Historian David Hobbs has stated that it had been "reduced to starving impotence" by the time of Operation Inmate. The garrison's main activity from mid-1944 onwards was growing food to sustain itself. The tropical conditions and damage caused by air attacks complicated this effort, and most of the Japanese personnel were malnourished. Nevertheless, the garrison also took extensive measures to protect the atoll from invasion and placed large stores of food and other supplies in reserve for such an eventuality. Following the end of the war in August 1945, United States forces found that the garrison still held enough ammunition to supply its gun batteries for at least 30 days of combat.

The BPF's Truk attack force was designated Task Group 111.2, and comprised the 4th Cruiser Squadron and 24th Destroyer Flotilla. The ships assigned to the 4th Cruiser Squadron were Implacable, the escort carrier HMS Ruler, the British cruisers HMS Swiftsure and Newfoundland, the Canadian cruiser HMCS Uganda and the New Zealand cruiser HMNZS Achilles. The 24th Destroyer Flotilla was made up of Troubridge, Teazer, Tenacious, Termagant and Terpsichore. The Task Group was commanded from Implacable by Rear Admiral E.J.P. Brind. While Implacable, Newfoundland and the destroyers had only recently arrived in the Pacific, all the other ships assigned to Task Group 111.2 had seen combat off Okinawa. Implacable's most recent combat experience was a series of air strikes conducted against German forces in Norway during late 1944.

Implacable embarked 80 aircraft, which was the largest number to be operated by any of the BPF's aircraft carriers. The air group included 38 Naval Air Wing, whose 801 and 880 Naval Air Squadrons were equipped with 48 Supermarine Seafire fighter aircraft. The other units assigned to the carrier were 828 Naval Air Squadron with 21 Grumman TBF Avenger torpedo bombers and 1771 Naval Air Squadron, which operated 11 Fairey Firefly fighters. Ruler was to be used as a "spare deck" for Implacable's air group to operate from, and embarked only a single Supermarine Walrus search and rescue aircraft from 1701 Naval Air Squadron.

== Attacks ==
=== 14 June ===
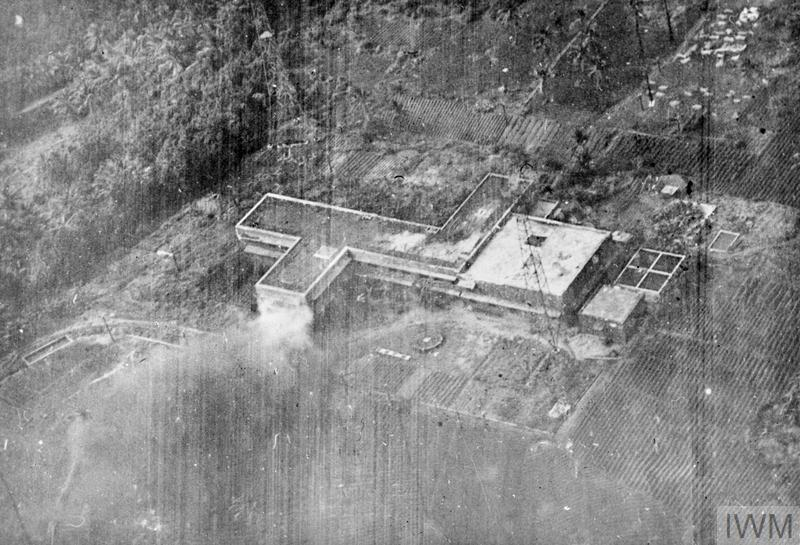
Rockets being fired from a Firefly at the radio station on Moen island

Task Group 111.2 sailed from Manus Island on 12 June. While en route to Truk, its orders were broadened to also include a cruiser bombardment of Japanese positions at Truk. This change was made as the cruisers were expected to be used against shore targets during future operations. In preparation for these bombardments, the Task Group conducted gunnery exercises during its voyage north. Ahead of the attacks on Truk, a US Navy submarine took up position near the atoll to rescue any British airmen who crashed into the sea.

The Allied warships reached the flying-off position for Implacable's air group at 5:30 am on 14 June. Ten minutes later, twelve Seafires and two Fireflies were launched. The Seafires strafed a radar station and an airfield on Moen island, and the Fireflies reconnoitred the atoll. A Seafire equipped with a reconnaissance camera also photographed Japanese installations; these photos were used to plan further air attacks and bombardments. One of the Seafires was shot down and its pilot killed while attacking the airfield, the only British aircraft to be lost in combat during Operation Inmate.

Implacable launched strikes every two and a quarter hours for the remainder of 14 June. These generally comprised five Avengers armed with bombs and four Fireflies with rockets and cannon. The final attack of the day was made by twelve Seafires which dive-bombed fuel tanks on Moen island. While several of the tanks were cracked open, it appeared that they were empty. This attack was the first time that Seafires had been used as fighter-bombers in the Pacific. The British aircraft reported finding few worthwhile targets; they were fired on by Japanese anti-aircraft guns throughout the day. All of the strikes were escorted by Seafires, but no Japanese aircraft were encountered in the air. During the night of 14/15 June two Avengers operated over the atoll in an attempt to prevent the Japanese from repairing the airfield on Moen; these aircraft were fired on and tracked by searchlights, but did not suffer any casualties.

Eight Seafires at a time from 38 Naval Air Wing patrolled over Task Group 111.2 for much of 14 June without encountering Japanese aircraft. Ruler was used as the base for this task, and refuelled and rearmed Seafires between sorties. The use of the escort carrier as a "spare deck" was considered successful, especially as a group of six Seafires which were low on fuel were able to land on Ruler when Implacable was caught in a squall and became unable to receive them. During the morning of 14 June Ruler's Walrus was blown overboard by a tropical squall and destroyed. Aerial search and rescue support for the force was provided by US Navy Consolidated PBY Catalina flying boats which flew in relay near Truk, but these aircraft were not required; destroyers were able to rescue the crews of ditched aircraft.

=== 15 June ===
The surface bombardment took place during the late morning of 15 June. The bombardment force was organised into three task units comprising both cruisers and destroyers; Achilles and Uganda (with Brind embarked) operated with Tenacious, Newfoundland was accompanied by Troubridge and Swiftsure by Teazer. This left the aircraft carriers with only two destroyers for protection. Each task unit was also assigned two Seafires to spot their gunfire. The destroyers which were assigned to the bombardment task units were responsible for counter-battery fire on any Japanese guns which fired on the cruiser, and for generating smoke screens if necessary. Throughout the bombardments the carriers sailed 10 miles (16 km) to the east of Truk, and maintained a combat air patrol over the area.

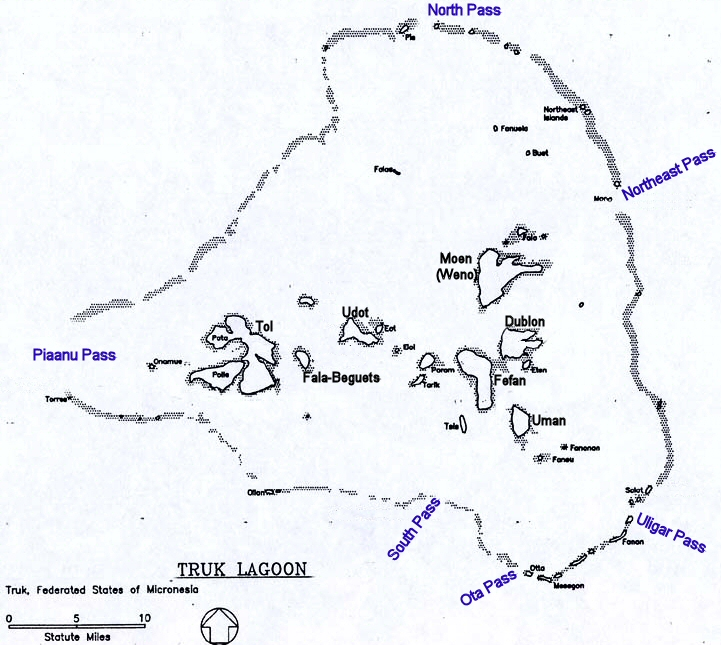
A map of Truk Lagoon

The cruisers experienced differing levels of success. Newfoundland initially attacked coastal gun batteries, but these did not fire on her or her escorting destroyer. She also successfully bombarded the airfield on Eten Island. The attacks by Achilles and Uganda on a seaplane base on Dublon Island did not cause any damage and were marred by communications problems between the ships and their spotting Seafires. As Achilles sailed away from Truk, her anti-aircraft gunners fired on two aircraft which approached her from the direction of the atoll, until they were identified as British Avengers.

Swiftsure's bombardment of Moen was particularly unsuccessful. The initial rounds fired by her guns landed well away from their targets, and attempts to correct her gunfire led to a further deterioration in accuracy. Her gunnery officer judged that the ship's fire control equipment was defective, and ordered the 6-inch (15 cm) gun turrets to fire under local control. This also proved unsuccessful as the gunners were unable to sight targets on the shore. After sailing closer to Moen, the ship attempted to engage Japanese positions with several of her 4-inch (10 cm) guns. However, the ammunition for these weapons was fitted with proximity fuses intended for use against aircraft, and exploded in the palm trees above their targets. As the fallen foliage hid the Japanese positions, further attacks were ineffective. A subsequent investigation found that a faulty split pin had fallen out of Swiftsure's Admiralty Fire Control Table, most likely due to concussion from the initial shots, causing it to provide highly inaccurate results to the guns. After the bombardment ended at 11:10 am, the ships involved rejoined the carriers.

Further air attacks were conducted on 15 June. During the afternoon, two groups of Avengers attacked a floating dry dock and several oil tanks. That night six Avengers armed with bombs supported by two flare-dropping Avengers conducted the final British attack on Truk, but it is believed that most of their bombs landed in the sea. This was the BPF's first large-scale night operation.

== Aftermath ==
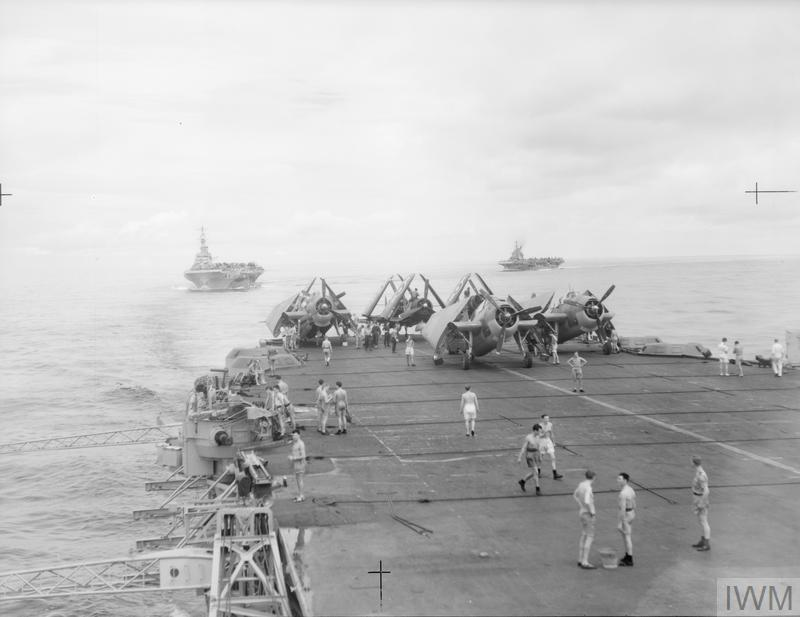
HMS Implacable (at back right) and Victorious viewed from Formidable on 10 July 1945

At the conclusion of the night strike Task Group 111.2 departed for Manus Island. On 16 June a Japanese aircraft was detected by radar. One of the Seafires was detached from the combat air patrol to intercept it, but the fighter's pilot had to abandon the attempt due to a mechanical problem. The Task Group arrived at Manus Island on 17 June, and continued training exercises there until the remainder of the BPF arrived on 4 July en route to further operations off Japan. All of the warships at Manus sailed on 6 July to join the Fast Carrier Task Force in attacks on the Japanese home islands. Implacable and the other ships of the BPF operated against Japan from 17 July to 12 August, during which time the Fleet conducted air attacks and participated in several bombardments of coastal Japanese cities. On 12 August most of the BPF's ships, including Implacable, departed for a period of maintenance and rest at Sydney.

A new Task Group 111.2 was formed by the BPF at Sydney on 12 August 1945. This force comprised the veteran aircraft carrier HMS Indomitable, three newly arrived light fleet carriers, two battleships, two or three cruisers and nine destroyers. These ships were intended to reinforce the BPF for the planned invasion of Japan, but lacked recent combat experience. Consideration was given to using the force to attack Truk again, with this operation possibly also including an invasion of the atoll by Australian or New Zealand forces, but this was unnecessary as Japan surrendered on 15 August.

United States air units regularly attacked Truk until the end of the war. The atoll's garrison formally surrendered at a ceremony conducted on board USS Portland on 2 September 1945, the same day as the general Japanese surrender documents were signed. The Japanese soldiers and sailors on Truk were repatriated during November and December 1945.

== Assessment ==
During Operation Inmate, Task Group 111.2's aircraft flew 103 offensive sorties during daylight and a further 10 at night. A total of 103 defensive sorties were also conducted. In addition to the Seafire shot down on 14 June and the loss of Ruler's Walrus, five Avengers were destroyed due to accidents while taking off; one of these aircraft crashed into the sea due to an error in attaching it to Implacable's catapult, causing the death of its pilot. The other four Avengers ditched due to engine malfunctions, with no fatalities. Two Seafires, both piloted by the same airman, were also damaged in landing accidents. A book published to mark the 50th anniversary of the BPF described these losses as low by the standards of 1945.

Japanese losses were modest. The British assessed that two Japanese aircraft had been destroyed and another three damaged during attacks on airfields at Truk. Damage was also believed to have been inflicted on the airfields, floating dry dock, oil tanks, other harbour installations and ships that were attacked. Following the operation, Brind judged that rockets had proven more useful than bombs, and was critical of the gunnery of all the cruisers other than Newfoundland. Members of the Japanese garrison told US Strategic Bombing Survey investigators after the war that the British raid had resulted in almost no damage. The most significant loss was the destruction of part of the garrison's records, which led to a decision to bury the remaining files.

Historian David Hobbs has judged that Operation Inmate "provided realistic and useful training for ships that were newly arrived in the Pacific and everyone, including Swiftsure's embarrassed gunners, ... learned something". Peter C. Smith has also noted that while few targets were located, the raids provided useful experience for Implacable's air crew and "the standards of flight launch and recovery attained during the operation were to stand them in good stead in the months ahead". Similarly, British official historian Stephen Roskill concluded that Operation Inmate achieved its goals.
