= 8th Carrier Air Group =

Royal Navy Fleet Air Arm Carrier Air Group

- White Ensign
- Active: 30 June 1945 - April 1946
- Country: United Kingdom
- Branch: Royal Navy
- Type: Carrier Air Group
- Size: 3 x fighter squadron; 1 x TBR squadron
- Part of: Fleet Air Arm
- Formed for: Implacable-class aircraft carrier
- Engagements: World War II: Pacific War; Air raids on Japan

The 8th Carrier Air Group (8th CAG) was a Fleet Air Arm (FAA) carrier air group of the Royal Navy (RN). It was formed in June 1945, for service in the British Pacific Fleet, until disbanding the following year, in April 1946. The group was allocated to the name ship of her class HMS Implacable.

== Naval Air Squadrons ==
8th Carrier Air Group consisted of a number of squadrons of the Fleet Air Arm.

| Squadron | Aircraft | From | To |
|---|---|---|---|
| 828 Naval Air Squadron | Grumman Avenger Mk.II, III | June 1945 | April 1946 |
| 801 Naval Air Squadron | Supermarine Seafire L Mk.III, F Mk.XV | June 1945 | April 1946 |
| 880 Naval Air Squadron | Supermarine Seafire L Mk.III | June 1945 | September 1945 |
| 1771 Naval Air Squadron | Fairey Firefly I | June 1945 | September 1945 |
| 1790 Naval Air Squadron | Fairey Firefly NF.Mk I | January 1946 | April 1946 |

== History ==
Following the end of World War II in Europe, the squadrons of the Fleet Air Arm, stationed on the Royal Navy's Fleet and Light Fleet aircraft carriers, were reorganised into Air Groups in accordance with United States Navy policy. This restructuring was designed to enhance operational effectiveness in the Pacific Theatre against Japanese forces in 1945. The two carriers of the Implacable class were assigned to Carrier Air Groups seven through ten. Each vessel was outfitted with two squadrons of twenty-four Supermarine Seafire aircraft, in addition to one squadron of fifteen Grumman Avengers and another squadron of fifteen Fairey Fireflys.

=== 1945-1946 ===
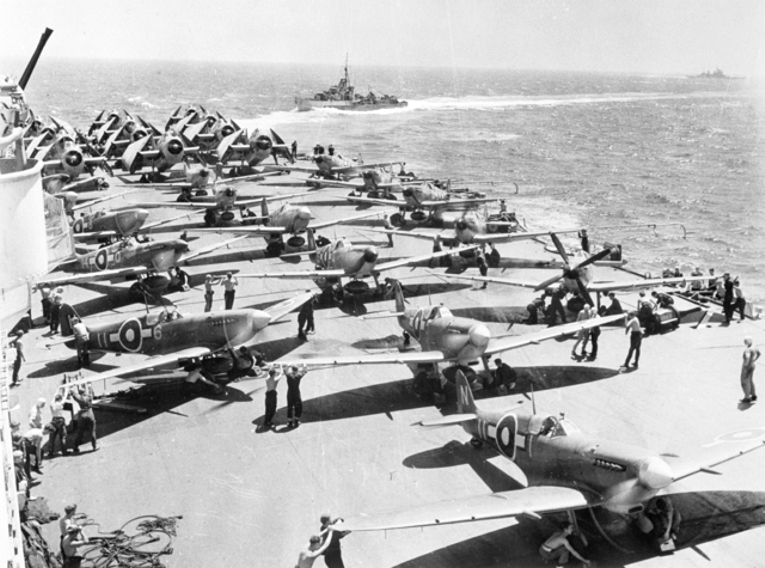
Avengers, Seafires and Fireflies on board HMS Implacable warm up their engines before taking off, 1945

The 8th Carrier Air Group of the Fleet Air Arm was formed on 30 June 1945, for the name ship of her class, the aircraft carrier HMS Implacable, for service in the British Pacific Fleet. It was made up of 828 Naval Air Squadron which operated the Grumman Avenger, an American torpedo bomber, 801 Naval Air Squadron and 880 Naval Air Squadron, which were equipped with Supermarine Seafire, a navalised Supermarine Spitfire fighter aircraft, and 1771 Naval Air Squadron which flew the Fairey Firefly, a carrier-borne fighter and anti-submarine aircraft.

The group flew off eight Fairey Firefly and a dozen Supermarine Seafire aircraft, from HMS Implacable, against targets north of Tokyo on 17 July, however, due to bad weather only the Fairey Firefly were able to locate their targets. Eight Fairey Firefly and twenty Supermarine Seafire aircraft attacked targets near Tokyo the following day, however, more bad weather halted flying operations. On the 24–25 July, Fleet Air Arm aircraft resumed attacks, crippling the escort carrier Kaiyo.

With the atomic bombing of Hiroshima and more bad weather, the group was unable to operate between the end of July and the 9 August. However, on that day, the CAG flew 94 x Supermarine Seafire sorties and flew 14 x Fairey Firefly sorties off HMS Implacable, against targets in northern Honshu and southern Hokkaido, with the loss of two Supermarine Seafire aircraft. On the 10 August, the sorties continued, sinking two warships, various small merchantmen and destroying railroad locomotives and dispersed aircraft. The CAG aircraft flew over 1,000 sorties since their arrival, the previous month.

In September 1945, 880 Naval Air Squadron was absorbed by 801 Naval Air Squadron, and also 1771 Naval Air Squadron disbanded. The 8th Carrier Air Group was disbanded in April 1946.

=== Aircraft used ===
Aircraft used by the naval air squadrons that formed the 8th Carrier Air Group in 1945:

- Grumman Avenger, an American torpedo bomber
- Supermarine Seafire, a navalised version of the Supermarine Spitfire fighter aircraft for service on British aircraft carriers
- Fairey Firefly, a carrier-borne fighter and anti-submarine aircraft

== Air Group Commanders ==
List of commanding officers of the 8th Carrier Air Group, with date of appointment:

- not identified, 30 June 1945
- Lieutenant Colonel P. P. Nelson-Gracie, RM, 10 October 1945
- disbanded - 4 April 1946

== See also ==
- List of Fleet Air Arm groups
- List of aircraft carriers of the Royal Navy
- List of aircraft of the Fleet Air Arm
- List of Fleet Air Arm aircraft in World War II
