= 801 Naval Air Squadron =

Inactive flying squadron of the Royal Navy's Fleet Air Arm

- Squadron badge
- Active: Royal Air Force; 1933–1939; Royal Navy: 1940–1941; 1941–1946; 1947–1955; 1955–1956; 1957–1960; 1962–1965; 1965–1970; 1981–2006; 2006–2007
- Disbanded: 9 March 2007
- Country: United Kingdom
- Branch: Royal Navy
- Type: Single-seat fighter squadron
- Role: Carrier-based fighter squadron; Carrier-based Maritime Strike
- Part of: Fleet Air Arm
- Mottos: On Les Aura (French for 'We'll have them')
- Aircraft: See Aircraft flown section for full list.
- Engagements: World War II; Korean War; Falklands War; NATO intervention in Bosnia and Herzegovina
- Decorations: Boyd Trophy 1967, 1981
- Battle honours: Norway 1940–44; Dunkirk 1940; Atlantic 1940; Malta Convoys 1942; North Africa 1942–43; Japan 1945; Korea 1952–53; Falkland Islands 1982

Commanders
- Notable commanders: Commander Nigel David "Sharkey" MacCartan-Ward, AFC, RN

Insignia
- Squadron Badge Description: White, a trident erect blue winged proper (1937)
- Identification Markings: 512-514 (Flycatcher); 516-521, to 134-136 (Nimrod 1936); 234–235, to 134–143 (Osprey 1936); 134–143 (Sea Gladiator); uncoded at first to U6A+ (Skua January 1940); A7A+ (Skua April 1940, unknown from May 1940); single letters (Sea Hurricane); 7A+ (Sea Hurricane June 1942); single letters (Spitfire); single letters (Seafire); P6A+, P7A+ and P8A+ (Seafire early 1945); 111–151 (Seafire June 1945); 150–161 (Sea Hornet); 450–462 (Sea Hornet March 1948); 150–161 (Sea Fury); 151–170 (Sea Fury March 1952); 146–158 (Sea Hawk); 116–127 (Sea Hawk January 1956); 115–124 (Buccaneer to July 1965); 230–243 (Buccaneer from October 1965); 000-008 (Sea Harrier)
- Fin Carrier/Shore Codes: N (Seafire June 1945); FD (Sea Hornet); AO:C (Sea Hornet March 1948); A (Sea Fury); R (Sea Fury March 1952); C (Sea Hawk); R:V (Buccaneer to July 1965); V:H:LM (Buccaneer from October 1965); N:R:L (Sea Harrier)

801 Naval Air Squadron (801 NAS), also known as 801 Squadron, is an inactive Fleet Air Arm (FAA) naval air squadron of the United Kingdom's Royal Navy (RN). It most recently operated the Harrier II GR.7 V/STOL strike aircraft as part of Joint Force Harrier (JFH), at RAF Cottesmore, Rutland, from October 2006 until March 2007.

Formed on 3 April 1933 by the redesignation of No. 401 (Fleet Fighter) Flight, FAA. Operating as a carrier-based fighter squadron, it served throughout the Second World War and operated with Blackburn Skua, Blackburn Roc, Hawker Sea Hurricane and Supermarine Seafire and it later operated with de Havilland Sea Hornet post-war. During the Korean War, it flew Hawker Sea Fury. These were followed with the Hawker Sea Hawk during the late 1950s and later the Blackburn Buccaneer during the 1960s. The squadron flew the Sea Harrier throughout the 1980s, 1990s and early 2000s, notably during the Falklands War.

== History ==
=== Fleet Air Arm of the Royal Air Force ===
801 Squadron of the Fleet Air Arm was established on 3 April 1933, at RAF Netheravon in Wiltshire, through the redesignation of No. 401 (Fleet Fighter) Flight, FAA, within the Royal Air Force.

Equipped with three Fairey Flycatchers and six Hawker Nimrods biplane fighters, it embarked in the aircraft carrier HMS Furious and commenced operations in Home waters and the Mediterranean. The Fairey Flycatchers were replaced by Hawker Ospreys in early 1934, while the Hawker Nimrods were retired in October 1936. In early 1939, Blackburn Skuas and Gloster Sea Gladiators were allocated to HMS Courageous for Deck Landing Training duties. However, following the transfer of the Fleet Air Arm to Admiralty oversight on 24 May 1939, the unit was reclassified as a second line squadron and redesignated as 769 Naval Air Squadron at RNAS Donibristle (HMS Merlin), Fife.

=== Second World War ===
==== Norway and the North Sea ====
In January 1940, 801 NAS was based at RNAS Donibristle HMS (Merlin) in Fife, with Blackburn Skua fighter-bomber aircraft, playing a key role in the early part of the war with operations in Norway while deploying from the aircraft carrier HMS Ark Royal. In September, 801 Squadron embarked on HMS Furious for raids on the northerly parts of the Norwegian coast. Following an attack on Trondheim on 22 September, Blackburn Skua L2942 piloted by Sub-Lieutenant Bernard Wigginton with Leading Aircraftman Kenneth King as his gunner, was unable to find their carrier and crash landed in neutral Sweden. Following a period of time spent on land, the squadron was disbanded and reformed as 800X Squadron.

On 1 August 1941, the squadron was reformed at RNAS Yeovilton (HMS Heron) in Somerset, where it received twelve Hawker Sea Hurricane fighter aircraft. Subsequently, it relocated to RNAS Hatston (HMS Sparrowhawk) on Mainland, Orkney, where it dedicated some time to the defense of Scapa Flow.

==== Sea Hurricanes and the Mediterranean ====
Ko The squadron was then deployed to the Mediterranean embarked on the aircraft carrier HMS Argus, before being transferred to HMS Eagle for convoy operations to Malta. Unfortunately, HMS Eagle was torpedoed on 11 August during Operation Pedestal and sank, resulting in the aircraft in the air being dispersed across the Illustrious-class aircraft carriers HMS Victorious and HMS Indomitable. The remaining personnel of the squadron subsequently returned to the UK.

The squadron re-formed at RNAS Stretton, Cheshire, on 7 September 1942, initially equipped with twelve Supermarine Spitfire fighter aircraft before converting to the Supermarine Seafire Mk Ib, a navalised Spitfire. It joined HMS Furious for Operation Torch, the Allied landings in North Africa. On 8 November 1942, a Supermarine Seafire Mk Ib of 801 Squadron shot down a French Dewoitine D.520 fighter near Oran. This engagement is recorded as the Seafire's first combat action.

==== Home Fleet and Tirpitz ====
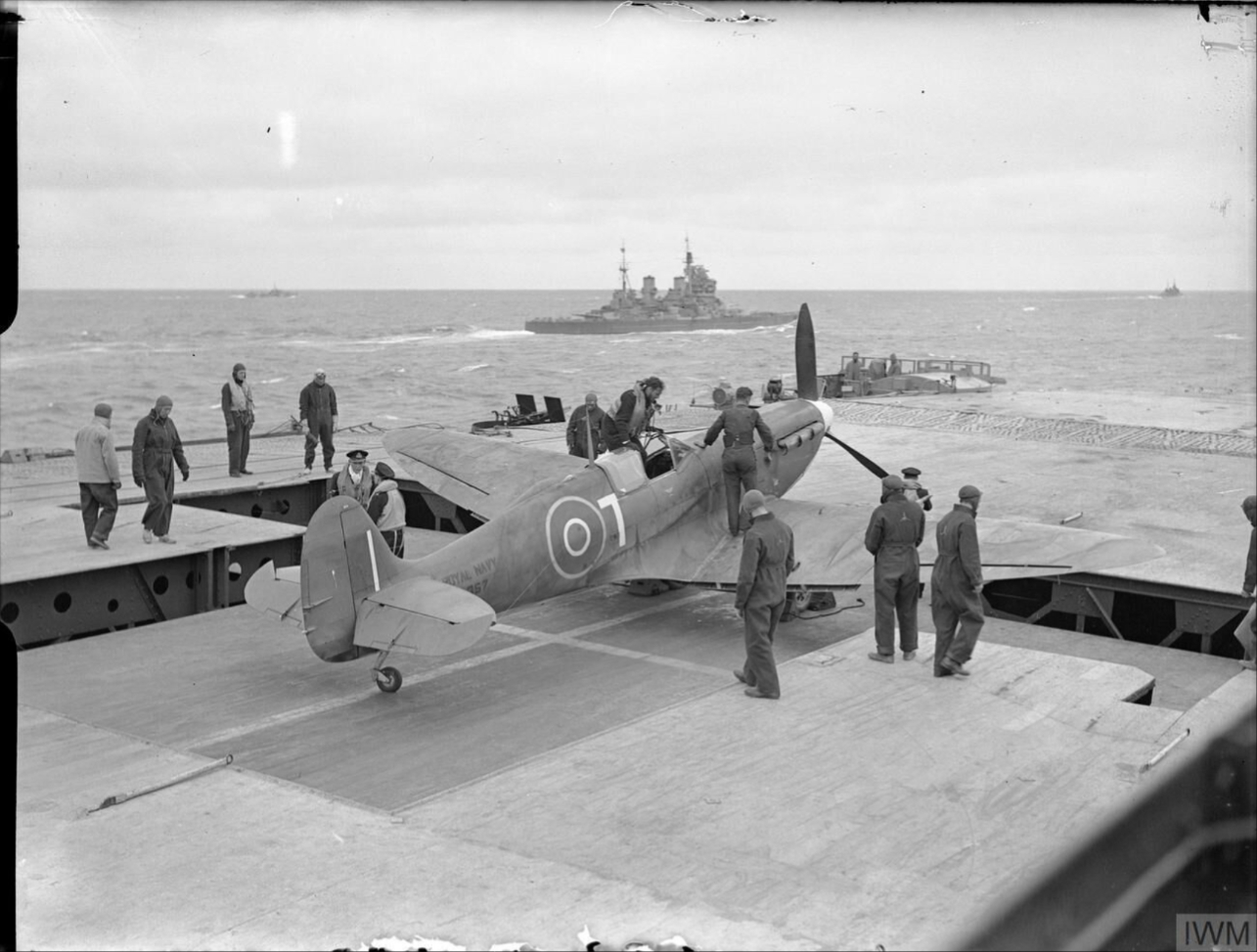
A Seafire of 801 Squadron on board Furious

After Operation Torch, the squadron returned to service with the Home Fleet. During 1943, it undertook operations off Norway and convoy-escort duties in the North Sea.

On 3 April 1944, 801 Squadron provided fighter cover for the Fleet Air Arm raid on the German battleship Tirpitz at Kaafjord, Norway, known as Operation Tungsten. It performed a similar cover role during further attacks the following month. In May 1944, the squadron re-equipped with twelve Supermarine Seafire L Mk.IIIs, which were used in subsequent operations against Tirpitz.

==== 30th Naval Fighter Wing and HMS Implacable ====
In October 1944, 801 Squadron joined the 30th Naval Fighter Wing, alongside 880 Naval Air Squadron. The Wing's Supermarine Seafire squadrons embarked in the name ship of her class HMS Implacable in November 1944, after assembling at RNAS Machrihanish, Argyll and Bute.

While serving aboard HMS Implacable, the squadron took part in operations off Norway. The carrier's air group provided fighter cover during minelaying operations and operations against German shipping and shore targets. These were activities undertaken by the carrier's embarked air group and its constituent squadrons, rather than by the Wing as a single flying unit.

In March 1945, 801 Squadron re-embarked in HMS Implacable with twenty-four Supermarine Seafires for service in the Far East. The carrier reached Manus Island in May, carrying 801 and 880 Squadrons, equipped with Supermarine Seafire L Mk.IIIs, as well as 828 Naval Air Squadron with Grumman Avengers and 1771 Naval Air Squadron with Fairey Fireflies. The squadrons later formed the 8th Carrier Air Group within the British Pacific Fleet.

The squadron's service in the Pacific included operations against Japanese targets. On 17 July 1945, sixteen Supermarine Seafires from 801 Squadron launched from HMS Implacable on a mission against airfields at Mobara, Naruto and Hasuda in the Tokyo area. The aircraft crossed the Japanese coast, but the mission was abandoned because of adverse weather over the target area.

Following the end of the war, 801 Squadron absorbed personnel and aircraft from 880 Squadron, increasing its strength to forty-eight aircraft. It subsequently re-equipped with eighteen Supermarine Seafire F Mk.XVs. The squadron returned to the United Kingdom in 1946 and disbanded at RNAS Lossiemouth, Moray, on 3 July 1946.

=== Sea Hornet (1947–1951) ===
The inaugural front-line unit of the Fleet Air Arm (FAA) to receive de Havilland Sea Hornet F.20 was 801 Naval Air Squadron, which was re-established on 1 July 1947, at RNAS Ford (HMS Peregrine) in West Sussex. The Sea Hornet represented the FAA's adaptation of the RAF's de Havilland Hornet long-range fighter, marking it as the first twin-engine, single-seat fighter to be deployed from the Royal Navy's aircraft carriers. Following a period stationed at RNAS Arbroath (HMS Condor), Angus, Scotland, the Sea Hornets of 801 Squadron were deployed aboard HMS Implacable in 1949, as part of the 1st Carrier Air Group and the squadron continued to operate these aircraft until they transitioned to Hawker Sea Furies in March 1951.

=== Sea Fury (1951–1955) ===
The Hawker Sea Fury represented the final piston-engine fighter used by the Fleet Air Arm in front-line squadrons, operating from 1947 to 1955. It was notable for being the first British naval aircraft to feature power-folding wings in regular service. The Sea Fury commenced its operational service in the late summer of 1947.

==== Korean War ====
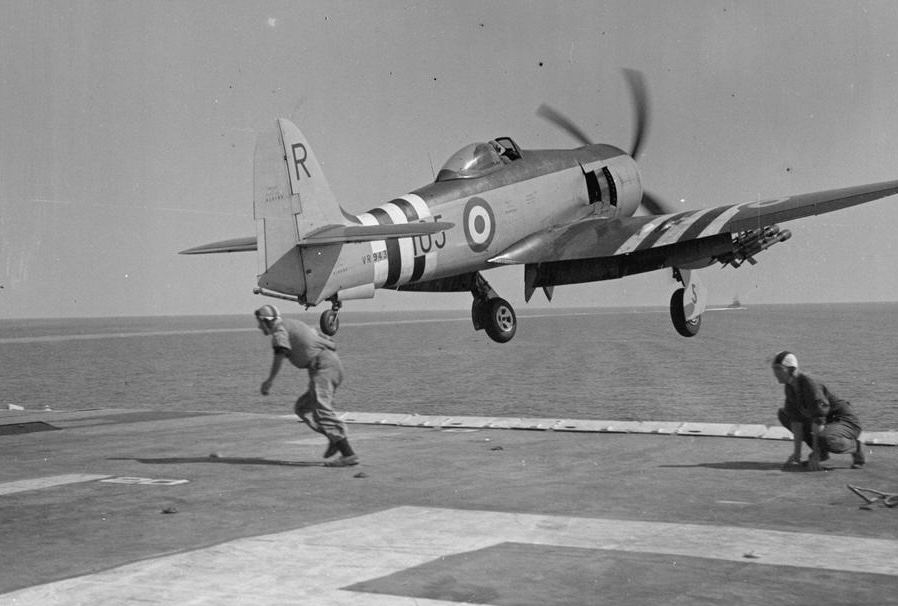
A Sea Fury FB.11 launches from Glory in 1951

In March 1951, 801 Naval Air Squadron received twelve Hawker Sea Furies and the squadron saw active service during the Korean War flying from the Colossus-class aircraft carrier HMS Glory. During its deployment in theatre from November 1952 to May 1953, 801 executed a total of 2,881 sorties across eleven operational patrols.

The Sea Furies were capable of being equipped with either two bombs or four rockets, along with drop tanks in both configurations. Primarily used alongside Fairey Fireflies within the same Carrier Air Group for ground-attack missions employing bombs and rockets, the Sea Furies also engaged the significantly faster Mikoyan-Gurevich MiG-15 jet fighters. The squadron suffered seven casualties.

Later, the squadron strength was reduced to twelve aircraft. From February 1954 it was shore based in the United Kingdom until it disbanded at RNAS Ford in January 1955.

=== Sea Hawk (1955–1960) ===
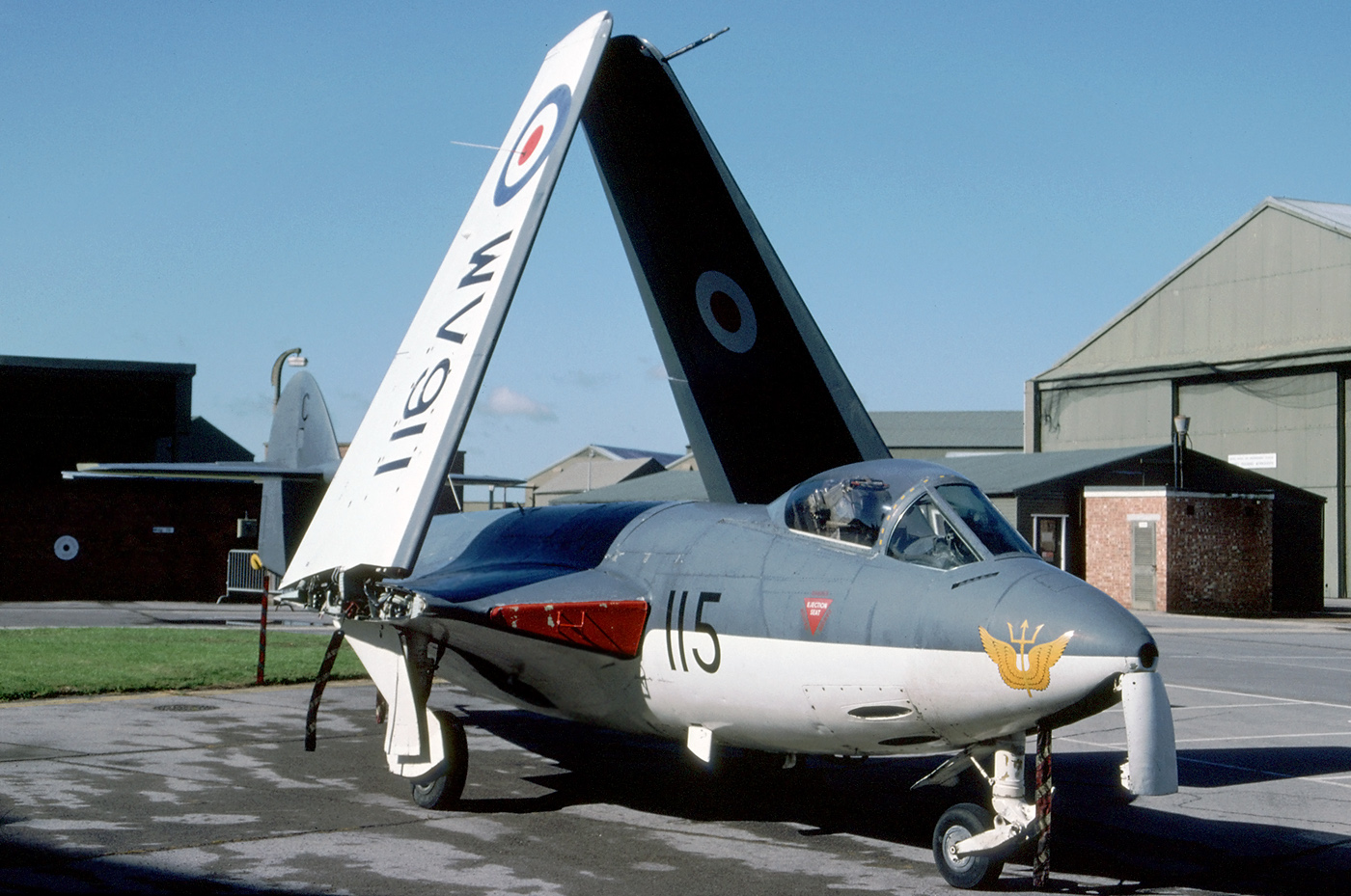
A Sea Hawk FGA 4 in 801 Squadron markings

801 Naval Air Squadron then recommissioned with twelve Hawker Sea Hawk FGA 4s in March 1955 at RNAS Lossiemouth and joined the recently commissioned Centaur-class aircraft carrier HMS Bulwark for trip to Scandinavia which included visits to Oslo, Trondheim and Copenhagen. In 1956, the squadron joined the lead ship of the class, HMS Centaur, for a tour of the Mediterranean and Far East, disembarking at RAF Tengah and RNAS Sembawang (HMS Simbang), Singapore, before returning home to disband at RNAS Lee-on-Solent (HMS Daedalus), Hampshire, in May.

The Sea Hawk was initially introduced to FAA squadrons in 1953, with the FGA 4 variant, designed for close air support operations, making its inaugural flight on 26 August 1954. The ultimate production model for the Royal Navy was the FGA 6, with the final Sea Hawk for the FAA being delivered in early 1956.

In May 1957, the squadron was re-established at RNAS Brawdy (HMS Goldcrest), Pembrokeshire, now equipped with ten Sea Hawk FGA 6 aircraft. It joined HMS Bulwark in November, which then embarked on a voyage to the West Indies in January 1958, subsequently operating in the Mediterranean and the Far East. From July to September 1958, HMS Bulwark was stationed at Aden, where the squadron occasionally engaged in confrontations with local insurgents, followed by similar operations in Oman. Upon returning to the UK, the squadron was regrouped in November and transferred to HMS Centaur in January 1959, continuing its deployments in the Mediterranean and the Far East, including additional operations in Aden during April. Returning to the UK in July the squadron disbanded.

=== Buccaneer (1962–1970) ===
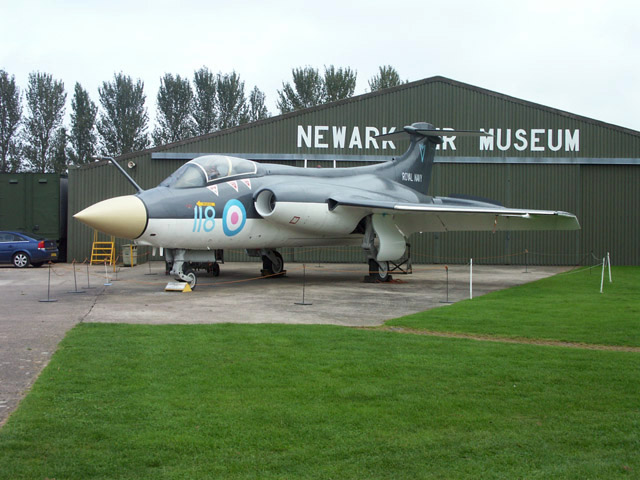
A Buccaneer S.1 in 801 Squadron markings

The Blackburn Buccaneer represented the initial example of an aircraft specifically engineered for low-level, high-speed strike missions. It was developed in response to an Admiralty specification for an aircraft capable of deploying a nuclear weapon by taking advantage of the weak points beneath enemy radar systems while achieving speeds exceeding Mach 0.9. It was introduced into service with the Royal Navy's 700Z Buccaneer S.1 IFTU in March 1961 under the designation Buccaneer S.1. The inaugural front line operational unit was 801 Naval Air Squadron, which was re-established at RNAS Lossiemouth (HMS Fulmar), located in Moray, in July 1962, serving as a strike squadron equipped with eight Buccaneer S.1 aircraft.

Under the command of Lieutenant Commander Edward Anson, RN and after a period of working up the squadron embarked in the Audacious-class aircraft carrier HMS Ark Royal on 19 February 1963. After the spell in HMS Ark Royal the squadron increased its strength to ten aircraft, embarking in HMS Victorious in August 1963 for the Far East. In September, the squadron disembarked to RAF Tengah in Singapore and subsequently re-embarked in HMS Victorious the following month, although a detachment of two aircraft remained until early as December. Later, towards the end of October, the squadron disembarked to RAF Kai Tak in Hong Kong, but returned to the carrier in early November, ultimately returning to Singapore in early December.

In February 1964, the squadron disembarked to Nairobi during a crisis in East Africa, with a detachment of six Buccaneers at Embakasi Airport between 7 and 22. Returning to the carrier for an extended duration in the Far East, which encompassed a trip to the Philippines where the squadron spent between 25 May to 9 June disembarked to the US Navy's Naval Air Station Cubi Point, Bataan, Philippines, 801 also spent time disembarked to RAF Changi in Singapore and there was a significant personnel transition in November during HMS Victorious’s refitting and recommissioning in Singapore. Upon returning to the United Kingdom, the squadron was disbanded in July 1965.

In October, the squadron was re-established with the improved Buccaneer S.2. Equipped with two Rolls-Royce Spey Mk.101 turbojets, it achieved a 30 percent increase in thrust and reduced fuel consumption, resulting in an extended operational range. Notably, on 4 October 1965, a Buccaneer S.2 accomplished the first non-stop transatlantic flight by a Fleet Air Arm aircraft. Subsequently, 801 Naval Air Squadron was reformed from a core group of 700B Buccaneer S.2 IFTU at RNAS Lossiemouth on 14 October.

Having joined HMS Victorious in July 1966, it returned to RNAS Lossiemouth in June 1967 after a deployment that encompassed three distinct visits to RAF Changi, Singapore. The squadron was later honoured with the 1967 Boyd Trophy for its contributions to the operational deployment of the Buccaneer S.2. In 1968, 801 squadron was reassigned to the Centaur-class light fleet carrier HMS Hermes and took its Buccaneers for an extended deployment in the Eastern region. In March 1969, the aircraft carrier returned to the United Kingdom, where it would remain for the subsequent year in Home and Mediterranean waters, with the squadron officially disbanding at RNAS Lossiemouth on 21 July 1970.

=== Sea Harrier (1981–2006) ===
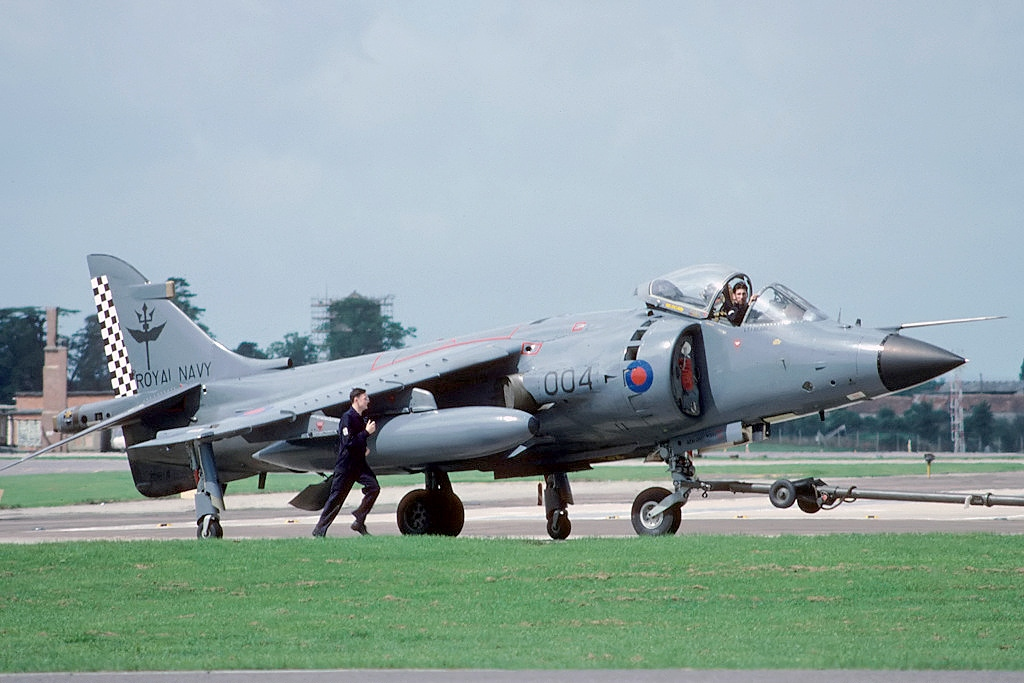
A Sea Harrier FRS.1, 801 Squadron

The British Aerospace Sea Harrier was a particular variant in a line of subsonic aircraft engineered for vertical and/or short take-off and landing (V/STOL) capabilities, designed for various roles including strike missions, reconnaissance, and air-to-air combat. It was officially introduced into the Royal Navy in June 1979, designated as the Sea Harrier FRS.1 and it was informally known as the 'Shar'.

On 28 January 1981, 801 Naval Air Squadron was reformed as the second operational squadron for the Sea Harrier, equipped with five Sea Harrier FRS.1 aircraft at RNAS Yeovilton (HMS Heron) located in Somerset. The 1981 Boyd Trophy was conferred upon it in recognition of the squadron's pilot's exceptional accomplishments in operating the Sea Harrier, which was embarked in the name ship of her class HMS Invincible.

==== Falklands War ====
The squadron operated the Sea Harrier equipped with Blue Fox radars aboard HMS Invincible during the Falklands War. The squadron was supplemented by five pilots from 899 Naval Air Squadron and was under the command of Lieutenant Commander Sharkey Ward.

In the course of the conflict, an additional Sea Harrier squadron, designated as 809 Naval Air Squadron, was established. This squadron, equipped with eight surplus aircraft, was transported south on the SS Atlantic Conveyor. Upon reaching the South Atlantic, the aircraft were allocated between the two carriers, with four assigned to each of 800 and 801 Naval Air Squadrons. The aircraft were integrated into these squadrons, similar to the 899 Squadron aircraft, yet they retained their distinct appearance due to their application of light grey low visibility camouflage, in contrast to the dark sea grey scheme employed by the other Sea Harriers.

801 NAS Pilots

- Lieutenant Commander Nigel "Sharkey" Ward (CO)
- Lieutenant Commander Doug Hamilton
- Lieutenant Charlie Cantan
- Lieutenant Alan Curtis - †
- Lieutenant Brian Haigh
- Lieutenant Stephen Thomas
- Flight Lieutenant Ian Mortimer
- Lieutenant Mike Watson

899 NAS Pilots

- Lieutenant Commander Robin Kent
- Lieutenant Commander John Eyton-Jones - †
- Lieutenant Commander Mike Broadwater.
- Flight Lieutenant Paul Barton

809 NAS Pilots

- Lieutenant Commander Tim Gedge
- Lieutenant Commander Dave Braithwaite
- Lieutenant Commander Alistair Craig
- Lieutenant Dave Austin

801 Squadron disroyed 10 Argentine aircraft.

- 1 May 1982 – A Mirage III of FAA Grupo 8 shot down north of West Falkland by Flight lieutenant Barton, RAF, with a Sidewinder. Pilot ejected
- 1 May 1982 – A Mirage III of FAA Grupo 8 damaged in the same action north of West Falkland by Lieutenant Stephen Thomas with a Sidewinder; subsequently shot down over Port Stanley by Argentine anti-aircraft defences, pilot killed
- 1 May 1982 – A Canberra B.62 of FAA Grupo 2 shot down north of the islands by Flight Lieutenant Curtis, RAF, with a Sidewinder. Both crew ejected but were not rescued
- 9 May 1982 – A A-4C Skyhawk of FAA Grupo 4 shot down near Chartres, West Falkland by Lieutenant Commander Stephen Thomas with a Sidewinder. (The other Skyhawk in this engagement was destroyed by Lieutenant Commander Mike Blissett from HMS Hermes)
- 21 May 1982 – A Pucará of FAA Grupo 3 shot down near Darwin by Commander Nigel Ward with 30mm cannon. Pilot ejected and survived
- 21 May 1982 – Three Dagger As of FAA Grupo 6 shot down north of Port Howard, West Falkland, two by Lieutenant Stephen Thomas and one by Commander Nigel Ward, all with Sidewinders All pilots ejected.
- 23 May 1982 – A Puma SA.330L of CAB 601 destroyed at Shag Cove House by Lieutenant Commander Gedge and Lieutenant Commander Braithwaite with 30mm cannon, following earlier damage by HMS Hermes pilots
- 1 June 1982 – A C-130E Hercules of FAA Transport Grupo 1 shot down 50 miles (80 km)s north of Pebble Island by Commander Nigel Ward using two Sidewinders and cannon. Crew of seven killed

Some "kills" are claimed jointly or disputed (Puma at Shag Cove)

===== Losses =====
801 Naval Air Squadron lost four aircraft and two pilots during the conflict.

- 6 May 1982 – Two aircraft (XZ452 and XZ453) collided in bad weather while flying a night sortie south east of East Falkland, investigating a radar contact close to the burnt-out wreck of HMS Sheffield. Both pilots, Lieutenant Comander Eyton-Jones in XZ452 and Lieutenant Curtis in XZ453, were killed and no trace of either aircraft found.
- 29 May 1982 – Sea Harrier ZA174 was being made ready for take-off, and slid off the deck when HMS Invincible turned sharply into the wind. The pilot, Lieutenant Commander Broadwater, ejected and was picked up.
- 1 June 1982 – XZ456 was shot down while on an armed recce by a Roland surface-to-air missile to the south of Port Stanley, by GADA 601. The pilot, Flight Lieutenant Mortimer, ejected and was rescued by a Westland Sea King from 820 Naval Air Squadron after nine hours in the water.

===== Gallantry Awards =====
Lieutenant Commander Ward and Lieutenant Thomas were each awarded the Distinguished Service Cross for their conduct and leadership throughout the campaign. Lieutenant Commander Kent and Flight Lieutenant Mortimer were both Mentioned in Despatches. Lieutenant Curtis was posthumously Mentioned in Despatches

==== 1982 to 2000s ====
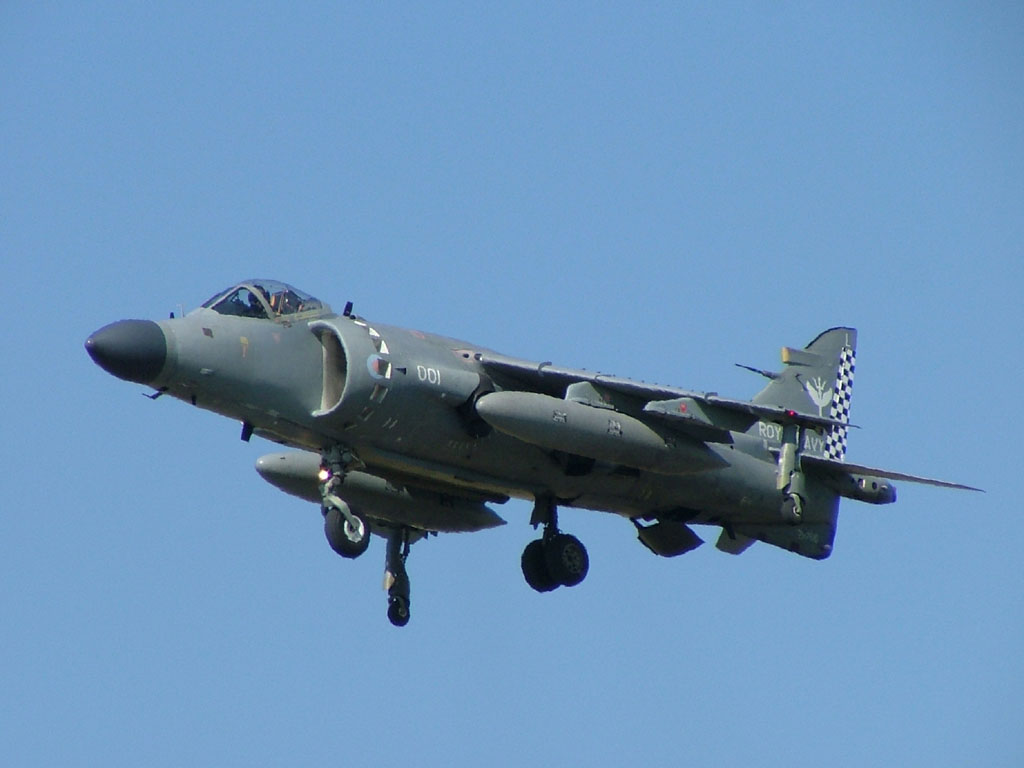
A Sea Harrier FA2 of 801 Squadron

In October 1994, the squadron upgraded to the advanced Sea Harrier FA2, which offered several improvements over the FRS.1 variant. These enhancements included a more powerful Rolls-Royce Pegasus Mk.106 engine, increased operational range, the Blue Vixen look-down radar system, a higher capacity for air-to-air munitions, compatibility with AIM-120 AMRAAM missiles, and improved cockpit instrumentation.

In March 1997, 801 NAS was deployed onboard HMS Illustrious as part of the Carrier Task Group assigned to the Armilla patrol when it took part in Operation Jural, enforcing the 'no fly' zone over southern Iraq. Equipped with FA2 Sea Harriers, the Squadron operated alongside Harrier GR.7s from No. 1 Squadron who had joined them on the carrier for a month of combined exercises and operations. Between 7–12 March, the Harriers flew 28 sorties (18 over Iraqi territory).

==== Decommissioning ====
On Tuesday 28 March 2006 a ceremony was held at RNAS Yeovilton, with Commander A J W Rae as the last Sea Harrier squadron commanding officer, to mark the withdrawal from service of the Royal Navy's Sea Harrier FA2s. The final Sea Harrier was withdrawn from service on 31 March 2006 at RNAS Yeovilton and the squadron disbanded. Prior to decommissioning, all aircraft adopted the omega symbol on their tail-fin in recognition of 801 NAS being the last operators of an all-British fixed-wing fighter aircraft. This harks back to the use of this symbol by 892 Naval Air Squadron, whose McDonnell Douglas Phantom FG.1s were the last conventional fixed-wing aircraft used by the Fleet Air Arm.

=== Harrier II (2006–2007) ===
801 Squadron was re-established under the command of Commander K. Seymour, RN, at RAF Cottesmore on 2 October 2006, equipped with Harrier GR. 7s, as a component of Joint Force Harrier. However, it did not operate as a fully autonomous unit, as a significant number of its personnel were allocated to support 800 Squadron.

However, due to lack of manpower all former 801 and 800 Squadron (their sister squadron) personnel formed the Naval Strike Wing (NSW) within RAF Cottesmore, on 9 March 2007, thus severing all remaining ties to their former home at RNAS Yeovilton. On 1 April 2010, Naval Strike Wing reverted to the identity of 800 Naval Air Squadron.

A proposal to reform 801 Squadron from the Naval Strike Wing in 2010 did not come to fruition.

== Aircraft flown ==
During its lifespan, 801 Squadron has flown fifteen different aircraft types:

- Fairey Flycatcher, fighter aircraft (April 1933 - June 1934)
- Hawker Nimrod I, fighter aircraft (April 1933 - October 1936)
- Hawker Osprey, fleet spotter/reconnaissance biplane (February 1934 - March 1939)
- Gloster Sea Gladiator, fighter aircraft (February 1935 - March 1939)
- Blackburn Skua, fighter-bomber (March 1939 - May 1939)
- Blackburn Skua, fighter-bomber (January 1940 - May 1941)
- Blackburn Roc, turret fighter aircraft (June 1940)
- Hawker Sea Hurricane Mk IA, fighter aircraft (August 1941 - November 1941)
- Hawker Sea Hurricane Mk IB, fighter aircraft (August 1941 - August 1942)
- Supermarine Spitfire Mk Va/Vb, fighter aircraft (September 1942 - October 1942)
- Supermarine Spitfire Mk Vb/hooked, fighter aircraft (September 1942 - October 1942)
- Supermarine Seafire F Mk.Ib, fighter aircraft (September 1942 - June 1944)
- Supermarine Seafire F Mk.IIc, fighter aircraft (October 1942 - May 1943)
- Supermarine Seafire L Mk.IIc, fighter aircraft (April 1944 - June 1944)
- Supermarine Seafire L Mk.III, fighter aircraft (May 1944 - November 1945)
- Supermarine Seafire F Mk.XV, fighter aircraft (September 1945 - March 1946)
- de Havilland Sea Hornet F.20, fighter aircraft (July 1947 - April 1951)
- de Havilland Sea Hornet PR.22, photographic reconnaissance aircraft (December 1949 - March 1950)
- Hawker Sea Fury FB.11, fighter-bomber (March 1951 - January 1955)
- Hawker Sea Fury T.20, trainer aircraft (December 1951 - January 1955)
- Hawker Sea Hawk FGA 4, jet fighter/ground attack aircraft (March 1955 - May 1956)
- Hawker Sea Hawk FGA 6, jet fighter/ground attack aircraft (May 1957 - July 1960)
- Blackburn Buccaneer S.1, jet strike aircraft (July 1962 - July 1965)
- Blackburn Buccaneer S.2, jet strike aircraft (October 1965 - July 1970)
- British Aerospace Sea Harrier FRS.1, V/STOL fighter, reconnaissance and strike aircraft (January 1981 - September 1994)
- British Aerospace Sea Harrier F(A).2, V/STOL fighter and strike aircraft (October 1994 - March 2006)
- British Aerospace Harrier GR.7, V/STOL strike aircraft (October 2000 - March 2007)

== Battle honours ==
801 Naval Air Squadron has been awarded numerous battle honours, including six during World War II:

- Norway 1940–44
- Dunkirk 1940
- Atlantic 1940
- Malta Convoys 1942
- North Africa 1942–43
- Japan 1945
- Korea 1952–53
- Falkland Islands 1982

== Assignments ==
801 Naval Air Squadron was assigned as needed to form part of a number of larger units:

- 30th Naval Fighter Wing (10 October 1943 – 30 June 1945)
- 8th Carrier Air Group (30 June 1945 – April 1946)
- 1st Carrier Air Group (October 1947 – May 1951)

== Commanding officers ==
List of commanding officers of 801 Naval Air Squadron:

1933 – 1939

- Lieutenant Commander R.R. Graham, RN, (Flight Lieutenant RAF), from 3 April 1933
- Squadron Leader C.E.W. Foster, RAF, from 9 May 1933
- Squadron Leader S.L.G. Pope, DFC, AFC RAF, from 13 September 1933
- Lieutenant Commander G. Willoughby, RN, (Squadron Leader RAF), from 7 January 1935
- Flight Lieutenant B.V. Reynolds, RAF, from 11 June 1936 (Squadron Leader 1 August 1936)
- Squadron Leader G.K. Fairclough, RAF, from 16 May 1938
- Lieutenant Commander C.A. Kingsley-Rowen RN, (Squadron Leader RAF), from 10 March 1939
- disbanded – 24 May 1939

1940 – 1941

- Lieutenant Commander H.P. Bramwell, RN, from 15 January 1940
- Lieutenant C.P. Campbell-Horsfall, RN, from 17 April 1940
- Lieutenant I.R. Sarel, DSC, RN, from 28 June 1940 (Lieutenant Commander 1 October 1940)
- disbanded – 2 May 1941

1941 – 1946

- Lieutenant Commander(A) R.A. Brabner, MP, RNVR, from 11 August 1941
- Lieutenant(A) F.R.A. Turnbull, DSC, RN, from 7 September 1942
- Lieutenant Commander(A) R.McD. Hall, DSC, RN, from 10 June 1943
- Lieutenant Commander(A) H.F. Bromwich, RN, from 3 November 1943
- Lieutenant Commander(A) S. Jewers, RNVR, from 18 July 1944
- Lieutenant Commander R.M. Crosley, DSC & Bar, RNVR, from 1 September 1945
- Lieutenant Commander(A) J.R. Routley, RNVR, from 7 June 1946
- disbanded – 3 June 1946

1947 – 1955

- Lieutenant Commander D.B. Law, DSC, RN, from 1 July 1947
- Lieutenant Commander D.H. Richards, RN, from 3 May 1948
- Lieutenant Commander K. Lee-White, MBE, RN, from 14 July 1949
- Lieutenant Commander J.G. Baldwin, DSC, RN, from 21 December 1950
- Lieutenant Commander L.T. Summerfield, RN, from 8 September 1951
- Lieutenant Commander A. Gordon-Johnson, RN, from 10 December 1951
- Lieutenant Commander P.B. Stuart, RN, from 1 May 1952
- Lieutenant Commander J.H.S. Pearce, DSC, RN, from 1 March 1954
- disbanded – 31 January 1955

1955 – 1956

- Lieutenant Commander L.J. Baker, RN, from 14 March 1955 (KiFA 16 February 1956)
- Lieutenant J.H. Nethersole, RN, from 17 February 1956
- disbanded – 16 May 19.56

1957 – 1960

- Lieutenant Commander J.H. Nethersole, RN, from 4 May 1957
- Lieutenant Commander W. Noble, DSC, RN, from 1 April 1958
- Lieutenant Commander D.T. McKeown, RN, from 4 August 1959
- disbanded – 26 July 1960

1962 – 1965

- Lieutenant Commander E.R. Anson, RN, from 17 July 1962 (Commander 31 December 1963)
- Lieutenant Commander P.H. Perks, RN, from 15 April 1964 (KiFA 26 November 1964)
- Lieutenant Commander A.J. White, RN, from 27 November 1964
- Lieutenant Commander J.F. de Winton, RN, from 29 December 1964
- disbanded – 27 July 1965

1965 – 1970

- Lieutenant Commander J.F. de Winton, RN, from 14 November 1965
- Lieutenant Commander M.C. Clapp, RN, from 10 December 1965
- Lieutenant Commander G.A.I. Johnston, RN, from 14 June 1967
- Lieutenant Commander M.J.A. Hornblower, RN, from 28 March 1968
- Commander R.C. Dimmock, RN, from 1 August 1969
- disbanded – 21 July 1970

1981 – 2006

- Lieutenant Commander N.D. Ward, RN, from 28 January 1981 (Commander, AFC, 30 June 1982)
- Lieutenant Commander A.R.W. Ogilvy, AFC, RN, from 29 July1982
- Lieutenant Commander M.S. Blissett, AFC, RN, from 23 July 1984
- Lieutenant Commander W.M. Covington, RN, from 28 April 1987
- Lieutenant Commander J.A. Siebert, RN, from 6 February 1989
- Lieutenant Commander M.W. Watson, RN, from 20 March 1990
- Lieutenant Commander T.S. Mannion, RN, from 20 November 1991
- Lieutenant Commander M.E. Robinson, MBE, RN, from 4January 19.1.94
- Lieutenant Commander C.W. Baylis, RN, from 16 February 19.2.96
- Lieutenant Commander H.G.M. Mitchell, RN, from 23 July 19.7.98
- Lieutenant Commander D.D. Acland, RN, from 1 August 20.8.00
- Commander J.A. Lawler, MBE, RN, from 2 April 2002
- Commander P.C.J. Stone, RN, from 19 April 2004
- Commander A.J.W. Rae, RN, 5 October 2004
- disbanded – 31 March 2006

2006 – 2007

- Commander K.W. Seymour, RN, 2 October 2006
- became Naval Strike Wing – 9 March 2007

Note: Abbreviation (A) signifies Air Branch of the RN or RNVR.

== See also ==
- Dennis Cambell – flew with 801 Naval Air Squadron during its initial formation
- British Pacific Fleet
- Ronald Cuthbert Hay – flew with 801 Naval Air Squadron during the Second World War
- Falklands War order of battle: British naval forces
