= Operation Provident =

Provinces Memorial

- Location: Norwegian coast
- Planned by: Royal Navy
- Commanded by: Henry Ruthven Moore
- Objective: Bombing of U-boat depot ships; Mining of Meløysund and Ramsøysund; Fighter attack on Bardufoss airfield; Bombing of ferry services in the Rørvik area; Attacks on shipping between Lødingen and Rørvik
- Date: 22–29 November 1944
- Casualties: Over 2,000

Operation Provident was carried out during World War II by the Home Fleet of the Royal Navy in the period 22–29 November 1944. The purpose of the operation was to carry out attacks on enemy shipping on the coast of Norway between latitudes 64° 30′ and 69° North. The operation took place under the personal command of the Commander-in-Chief, Home Fleet, Admiral Sir Henry Ruthven Moore, flying his flag in the aircraft carrier HMS Implacable. It is remembered for the destruction of MS Rigel in Norway's worst disaster at sea.

The force consisted of two groups, designated Force 7 and Force 8. Force 7 comprised the flagship Implacable, HMS Dido, and six destroyers: HMS Myngs (Captain (D) 23rd Destroyer Flotilla), HMS Scorpion, HMS Scourge, HMCS Sioux, HMS Zephyr and HMCS Algonquin. Embarked on Implacable were Naval Air Squadrons 801, 880 and 1771 of the Fleet Air Arm, equipped with Supermarine Seafire and Fairey Firefly aircraft.

Force 8 comprised the cruiser HMS Devonshire under the command of Captain D.K Bain RN, two escort carriers HMS Premier and HMS Pursuer, and five destroyers: HMS Saumarez (Captain (D) 26th Destroyer Flotilla), HMS Volage, HMS Zealous, HMS Venus and HMS Vigilant.

== Objects of the operation ==
The operation had five objectives: a bombing attack on U-boat depot ships, the mining of Meløysund and Ramsøysund, a fighter attack on Bardufoss airfield, the bombing of ferry services in the Rørvik area, and attacks on shipping between Lødingen and Rørvik.

The U-boat depot listed was the one at Kilbotn which consisted of the former North-Sea ferry Black Watch with smaller ships. Bad weather forced the abandonment of this objective, and the depot at Kilbotn was eventually attacked successfully in Operation Judgement on 4 May 1945.

== Actions ==
The force left Scapa Flow on 22 November 1944 but by 24 November heavy weather with winds of up to 60 knots (69 mph) was hampering operations. The two escort carriers Premier and Pursuer suffered weather damage, and in company with Devonshire and the remainder of Force 8 they returned to Scapa, arriving on the 26th. Meanwhile, Implacable remained at sea with Force 7.

By 27 November the weather had moderated enough for aircraft from Implacable to search for a convoy reported near the island of Alsten. Locating the convoy they made an attack on MS Rigel which they identified as a German troopship south of Sandnessjøen. Rigel had 450 German soldiers on board, but also a large number of Russian and Serbian prisoners of war in the cargo holds, and there were over 2000 casualties.
