= 1771 Naval Air Squadron =

Inactive flying squadron of the Royal Navy's Fleet Air Arm

- Squadron badge
- Active: 1944–1945
- Disbanded: 16 October 1945
- Country: United Kingdom
- Branch: Royal Navy
- Type: Two-seat fighter squadron
- Role: Fighter Squadron
- Size: twelve aircraft
- Part of: Fleet Air Arm
- Home station: See Naval air stations section for full list.
- Engagements: World War II: European theatre of World War II; Operation Provident; Pacific War; Air raids on Japan
- Battle honours: Norway 1944; Japan 1945

Insignia
- Squadron Badge Description: Blue, a base barry wavy of six white and blue an eagle gold in combat with a sea monster black issuant from base armed and langued red (1944)
- Identification Markings: single letters 4A+ (September 1944); 270-281 (July 1945)
- Fin Carrier Code: N (July 1945)

Aircraft flown
- Fighter: Fairey Firefly

1771 Naval Air Squadron (1771 NAS) was a Naval Air Squadron of the Royal Navy's Fleet Air Arm which disbanded at HMS Nabbington, RNAS Nowra, near Sydney, in October 1945. Notably, the squadron was the first British & Commonwealth unit to fly over Japan in the Second World War. The squadron formed at HMS Heron, RNAS Yeovilton at the start of February 1944, as a Fighter Squadron and also operated from HMS Ringtail, RNAS Burscough, and HMS Landrail, RNAS Machrihanish, with deck landing training on the escort carriers HMS Trumpeter and HMS Ravager before embarking in the fleet carrier HMS Implacable in September. It was involved in sorties over Norway including reconnaissance of the German battleship Tirpitz and other anti-shipping strikes. The squadron remained in HMS Implacable and joined the British Pacific Fleet participating in attacks on the Caroline Islands and the Japanese home islands, and becoming part of the 8th Carrier Air Group.

== History ==
=== Two-seater Fighter Squadron (1944–1945) ===
1771 Squadron formed at RNAS Yeovilton (HMS Heron), Somerset, on 1 February 1944 as a two-seater fighter squadron. It was equipped with twelve Fairey Firefly I, a carrier-borne fighter, anti-submarine and reconnaissance aircraft. At the beginning of March the squadron relocated to RNAS Burscough (HMS Ringtail), Lancashire, which had day and night fighter facilities. In late June early July, deck landing training was done on the Ruler-class escort carrier HMS Trumpeter. Early August saw the squadron move to RNAS Machrihanish (HMS Landrail), Kintyre, Argyll and Bute, Scotland, and mid-month HMS Ravager, an Attacker-class escort carrier, provided deck landing training.

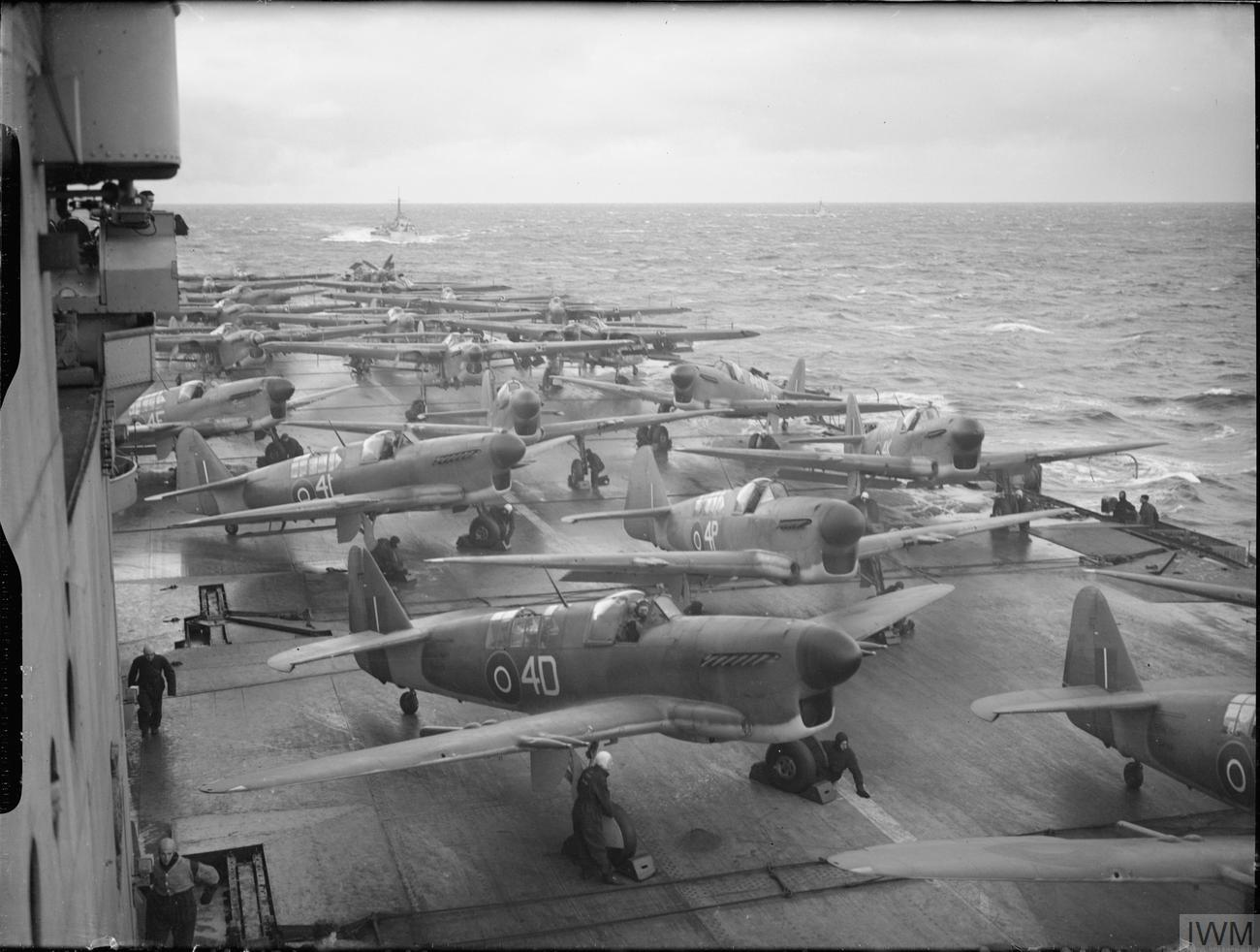
Fairey Firefly of 1771 Squadron on the flight deck of HMS Implacable warming up ready to make strike on enemy shipping at the entrance to Altafjord, Norway.

The squadron embarked in the name ship of her class of aircraft carrier, HMS Implacable on 22 September and the following month undertook reconnaissance missions over Norway, including Tromsø, where the German battleship Tirpitz was anchored. This was followed by anti-shipping strikes in November, with one troopship being destroyed and four other ships damaged.

In March 1945 HMS Implacable sailed for the Far East joining the British Pacific Fleet. The squadron disembarked in May and spent two weeks at RNAS Jervis Bay (HMS Nabswick), New South Wales, Australia, the location of Mobile Naval Air Base (MONAB) V, with it re-embarking on the carrier on 24 May. It took part in Operation Inmate, with attacks on Truk in the Caroline Islands in June. A detachment of seven aircraft from the squadron disembarked from HMS Implacable between 9–12 May to RNAS Ponam (HMS Nabaron), Ponam Island, a former United States Navy airstrip transferred to the Royal Navy on loan.

It conducted attacks in operations against the Japanese mainland as part of the 8th Carrier Air Group, just before the end of the Second World War. 1771 Naval Air Squadron disembarked to RNAS Nowra (HMS Nabbington), New South Wales, Australia, on 13 September, disbanding on 16 October. Squadron personnel had moved to HMS Golden Hind, Camp Warwick, Sydney on 4 October and returned to the United Kingdom aboard MV Dominion Monarch the following month.

== Aircraft flown ==
1771 Naval Air Squadron flew only one aircraft type:

- Fairey Firefly I fighter and anti-submarine aircraft (February 1944 - September 1945)

== Battle honours ==
The battle honours awarded to 1771 Naval Air Squadron are:

- Norway 1944
- Japan 1945

== Assignments ==
1771 Naval Air Squadron was assigned as needed to form part of a number of larger units:

- 8th Carrier Air Group (30 June 1945 - 16 October 1945)

== Naval air stations ==
1771 Naval Air Squadron operated from a number of naval air stations of the Royal Navy, in the United Kingdom, a number overseas, and a couple of Royal Navy escort carrier and a fleet carrier:

- Royal Naval Air Station Yeovilton (HMS Heron), Somerset, (1 February - 3 March 1944)
- Royal Naval Air Station Burscough (HMS Ringtail), Lancashire, (3 March - 7 August 1944)
  - HMS Trumpeter (Detachment four aircraft deck landing training (DLT) 29 June - 1 July 1944)
- Royal Naval Air Station Machrihanish (HMS Landrail), Argyll and Bute, (7 August - 22 September 1944)
  - HMS Ravager (Detachment four aircraft DLT 16 - 17 August 1944)
- HMS Implacable (22 September - 7 November 1944)
- Royal Naval Air Station Hatston (HMS Sparrowhawk), Mainland, Orkney, (7 - 16 November 1944)
- HMS Implacable (16 - 29 November 1944)
- Royal Naval Air Station Hatston (HMS Sparrowhawk), Mainland, Orkney, (29 November - 5 December 1944)
- HMS Implacable (5 - 9 December 1944)
- Royal Naval Air Station Hatston (HMS Sparrowhawk), Mainland, Orkney, (9 December 1944 - 8 January 1945)
- Royal Air Force Mullaghmore, County Antrim, (8 January - 7 February 1945)
- Royal Naval Air Station Ayr (HMS Wagtail), South Ayrshire, (7 February - 10 March 1945)
  - HMS Pretoria Castle (Detachment six aircraft DLT 6 - 10 March 1945)
- Royal Naval Air Station Arbroath (HMS Condor), Angus, (10 - 12 March 1945)
- HMS Implacable (12 March - 7 May 1945)
- Royal Naval Air Station Jervis Bay (HMS Nabswick), Jervis Bay Territory, (7 - 24 May 1945)
- HMS Implacable (24 May - 13 September 1945)
  - Royal Naval Air Station Ponam (HMS Nabaron), Admiralty Islands, (Detachment seven aircraft 9 - 12 December 1945)
- Royal Naval Air Station Nowra (HMS Nabbington), New South Wales, (13 September - 16 October 1945)
- disbanded - (16 October 1945)

== Commanding officers ==
List of commanding officers of 1771 Naval Air Squadron with date of appointment:

- Lieutenant Commander(A) H.M. Ellis, DSC, DFC, RN, from 1 February 1944 (KiFA 6 March 1945)
- Lieutenant Commander(A) W.J.R. MacWhirter, DSC, RN, from 9 March 1945
- disbanded - 16 October 1945

Note: Abbreviation (A) signifies Air Branch of the RN or RNVR.
