= RAF Skeabrae =

Former Royal Air Force station on Mainland, Orkney, Scotland

RAF Skeabrae RNAS Skeabrae HMS Tern II
- Dounby, Mainland, Orkney in Scotland
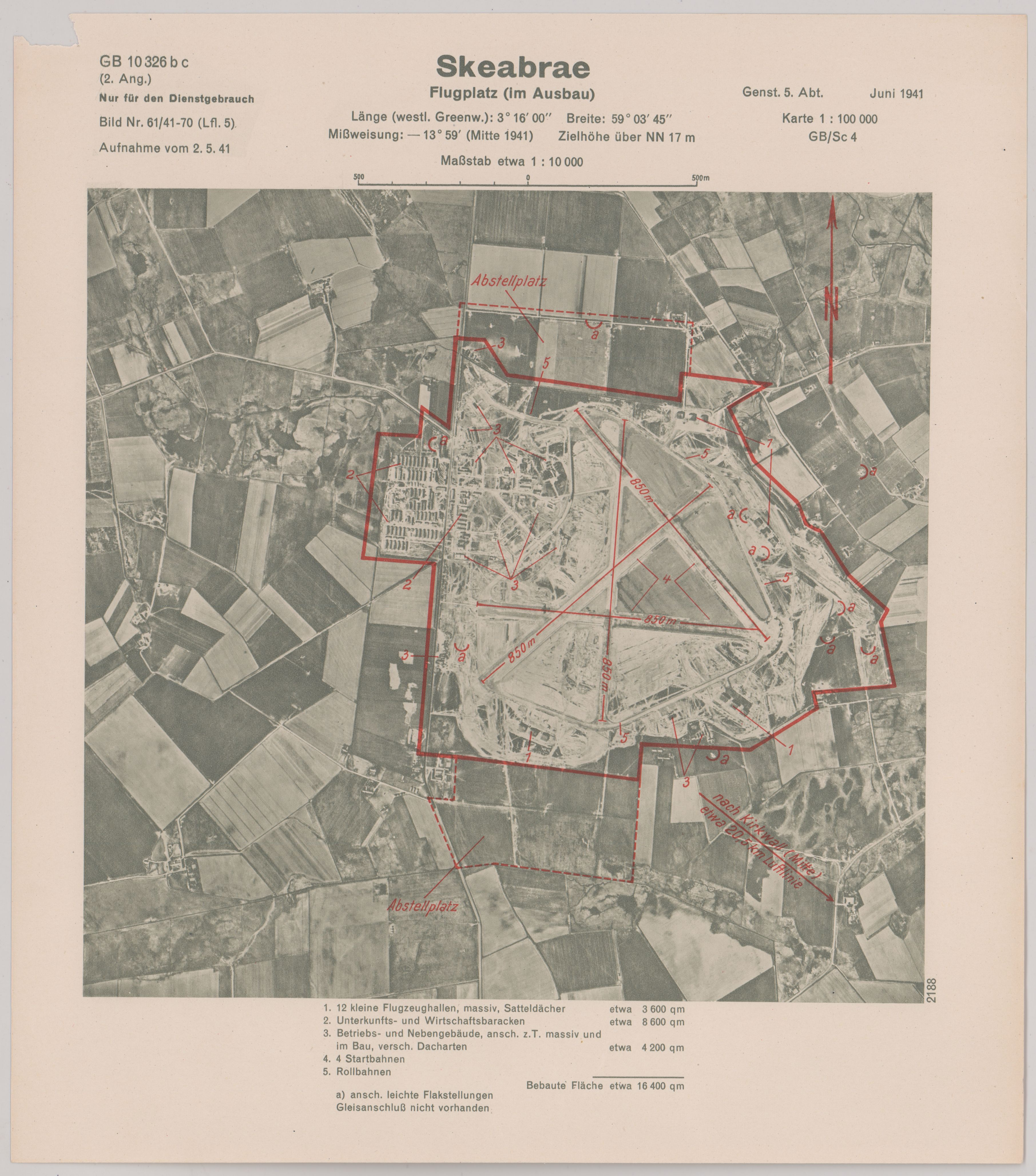
- RAF Skeabrae on a target dossier of the German Luftwaffe, 1941

Site information
- Type: Royal Air Force station
- Code: KJ
- Owner: Air Ministry
- Operator: Royal Air Force; Royal Navy
- Controlled by: RAF Fighter Command; Fleet Air Arm
- Condition: Disused

Location
- Location within Orkney RAF Skeabrae (the United Kingdom)
- Coordinates: 59°03′52″N 003°16′09″W

Site history
- Built: 1940
- In use: August 1940 - 1957
- Fate: Housing / Open land
- Battles/wars: European theatre of World War II

Airfield information
- Elevation: 18 metres (59 ft) AMSL
Runways
Direction	Length and surface
02/20	1,000 yards (914 metres) x 25 yards (23 metres) Concrete
07/25	1,000 yards (914 metres) x 25 yards (23 metres) Concrete
11/29	1,000 yards (914 metres) x 25 yards (23 metres) Concrete
15/33	1,000 yards (914 metres) x 25 yards (23 metres) Concrete
- Source: Royal Navy Research Archive

Royal Air Force Skeabrae, or more simply RAF Skeabrae, is a former Royal Air Force station located on Mainland, Orkney, United Kingdom.

Skeabrae was initially set up as a naval air station for the Admiralty and was handed over to the Air Ministry in May 1940, even though it was still under construction. No. 14 Group RAF took over the administrative management of the station. Its primary role was to provide fighter defense for the Royal Navy fleet based at Scapa Flow. Following the end of the war, the airfield was returned to the Admiralty, known as Royal Naval Air Station Skeabrae (RNAS Skeabrae), commissioned HMS Tern II and maintained as a reserve station.

== History ==
Initially developed as a naval air station for the Admiralty, Skeabrae was handed over to the Air Ministry, albeit unfinished, on 2 May 1940. This transfer was executed to address the demand for additional Royal Air Force fighter bases in the Orkneys. Lodger facilities for Royal Navy Fleet Air Arm squadrons were granted by No. 13 and No. 14 Groups from May 1940 with accommodation for one Fleet Air Arm squadron. The RAF commenced its arrival on 15 August 1940, then on 30 August, No. 14 Group RAF took over the administrative management of the station.

=== Facilities ===
Accommodation at the station was located in the north-west corner of the airfield. The figures recorded reflect the capacity at the time the site was taken over from the Royal Air Force and were subject to later reduction. The accommodation capacity comprised 94 officers, 1,516 chief petty officers, petty officers and ratings, 6 WRNS officers, and 168 WRNS chief petty officers, petty officers and ratings. Aircraft dispersal facilities included one double and two triple fighter pens located off the perimeter track to the north-east of the end of runway 11. A further double fighter pen was situated off the perimeter track between the ends of runways 29 and 25. The airfield contained twelve Tee Side hangars, arranged in four groups of three outside the perimeter track, each measuring 70 feet (21 m) by 60 feet (18 m), with doors 20 feet (6 m) high and 60 feet (18 m) wide. In addition, a Callender-Hamilton hangar was erected on the technical site in November 1944, measuring 185 feet (56 m) by 110 feet (34 m), with doors 25 feet (8 m) high and 100 feet (30 m) wide.

=== Operations ===
The primary role of the station was to provide fighter defence for the Royal Navy fleet based at Scapa Flow, with two Royal Air Force fighter squadrons allocated for this purpose. The first operational aircraft to arrive, however, were from the Fleet Air Arm: on 10 October 1940, 804 Naval Air Squadron disembarked its Gloster Sea Gladiator, biplane fighter aircraft, from the aircraft carrier HMS Furious. The squadron was scheduled to re‑equip with twelve Grumman Martlets, American carrier-based fighter aircraft and on 25 December 1940 two aircraft, flown by Lieutenant R.H.P. Carver and Sub‑Lieutenant T.R.V. Parke, intercepted and shot down a Junkers Ju 88 over Scapa Flow. This action marked the first destruction of an enemy aircraft by an American‑built fighter during the Second World War. The squadron relocated to RAF Skitten, Caithness, on 7 January 1941.

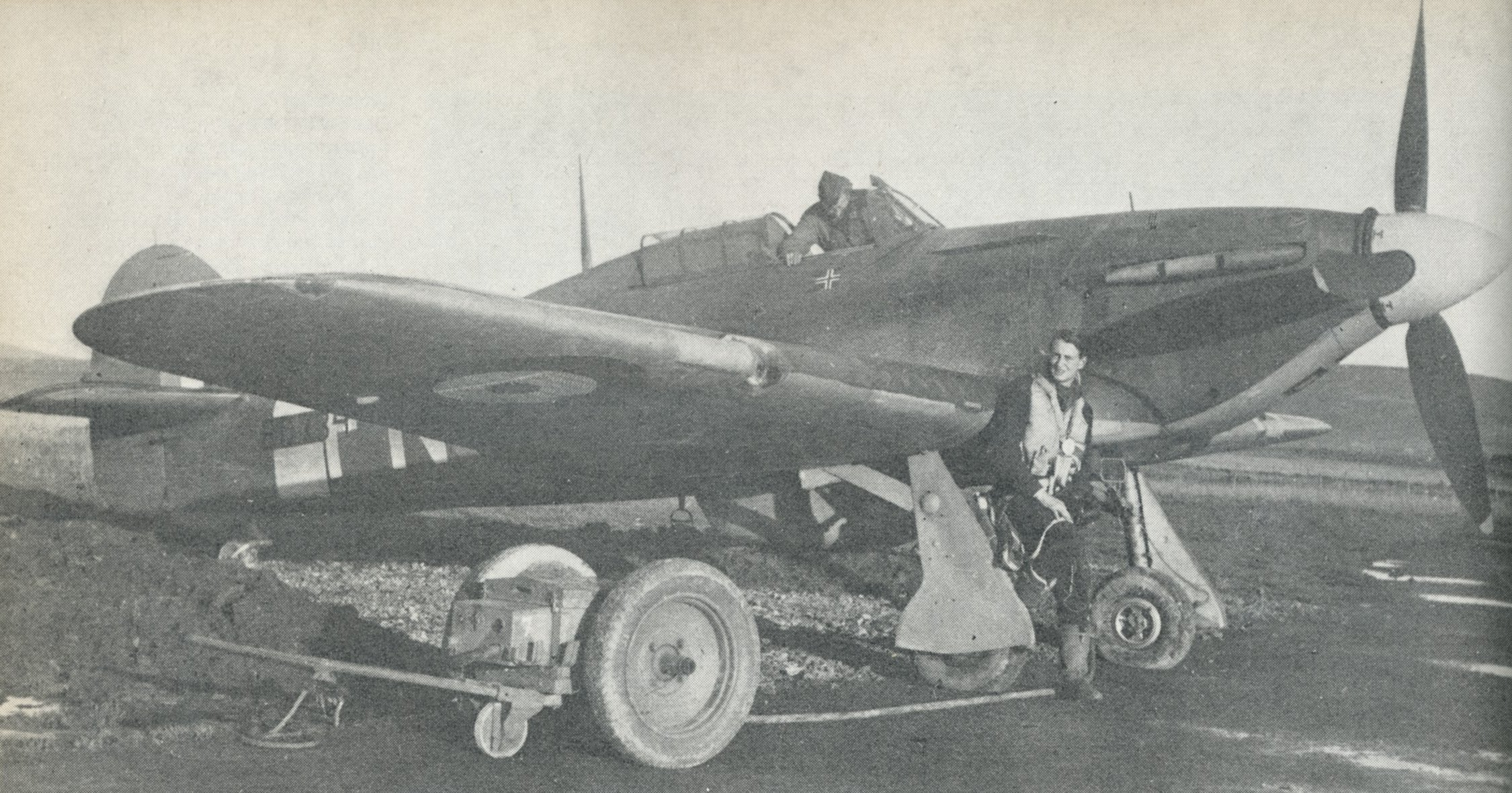
Hawker Hurricane from 331 (N) Squadron at Skeabrae, Orkney Islands, 1941. The pilot in front of the plane is Jens Müller

The first Royal Air Force detachment arrived later that month, when a flight of Hawker Hurricane fighter aircraft from No. 3 Squadron deployed to the station. They were replaced in February 1941 by No. 253 Squadron, also operating the Hawker Hurricane, which remained until September. No. 331 (Norwegian) Squadron then took over the fighter defence role until May 1942.

The next Fleet Air Arm unit to arrive was 801 Naval Air Squadron, which brought its Hawker Sea Hurricanes, a navalised Hawker Hurricane, from RNAS St Merryn, Cornwall, on 8 November 1941. The squadron remained until 15 February 1942, when it moved to RAF Tain, Highlands. In February, No. 132 Squadron relocated from RAF Peterhead, Aberdeenshire, with Supermarine Spitfire Mk.IIB fighter aircraft, whilst also maintaining a detachment at RAF Sumburgh, Shetland, a common practice for squadrons stationed at RAF Skeabrae. The Squadron transitioned to RAF Grimsetter, also on Mainland, Orkney, in June. During its time at RAF Skeabrae, it briefly overlapped with No. 164 Squadron, which arrived in early May. Additionally, No. 602 Squadron operated Supermarine Spitfires at this location from September 1942 until January 1943, and again in 1944.

Two further FAA units made short visits before embarking in HMS Victorious: 884 Naval Air Squadron, equipped with six Fairey Fulmar Mk.II, British carrier-borne reconnaissance and fighter aircraft, arrived from RNAS Lee-on-Solent, Hampshire, on 25 September 1942 and embarked on 20 October; and 882 Naval Air Squadron, with twelve Grumman Martlet Mk IVs, arrived from RNAS Donibristle, Fife, on 1 October and embarked on 6 October. The Fairey Fulmars of 884 Squadron returned on 25 November after a period at RNAS Twatt, also on Mainland, Orkney, departing again for RAF Turnhouse, Edinburgh, on 13 December 1942.

Fighter training was also undertaken at the station. No. 1491 (Fighter Gunnery) Flight, an aerial target‑towing unit, moved to the airfield at the end of 1942 and remained until August 1943. No. 1476 (Advanced Ship Recognition) Flight was formed at the station in early 1943 to provide training in ship recognition and the bombing of moving targets; it was disbanded in early 1944.

The Supermarine Spitfires belonging to No. 66 Squadron arrived from RAF Ibsley, Hampshire, in February 1943, succeeding No. 129 Squadron, and remained in place until June, during which they operated a detachment at RAF Sumburgh for a portion of this period. No. 234 Squadron was stationed here from April to June. Following this, No. 312 (Czechoslovak) Squadron was present from June to September, and they were succeeded by No. 453 Squadron.

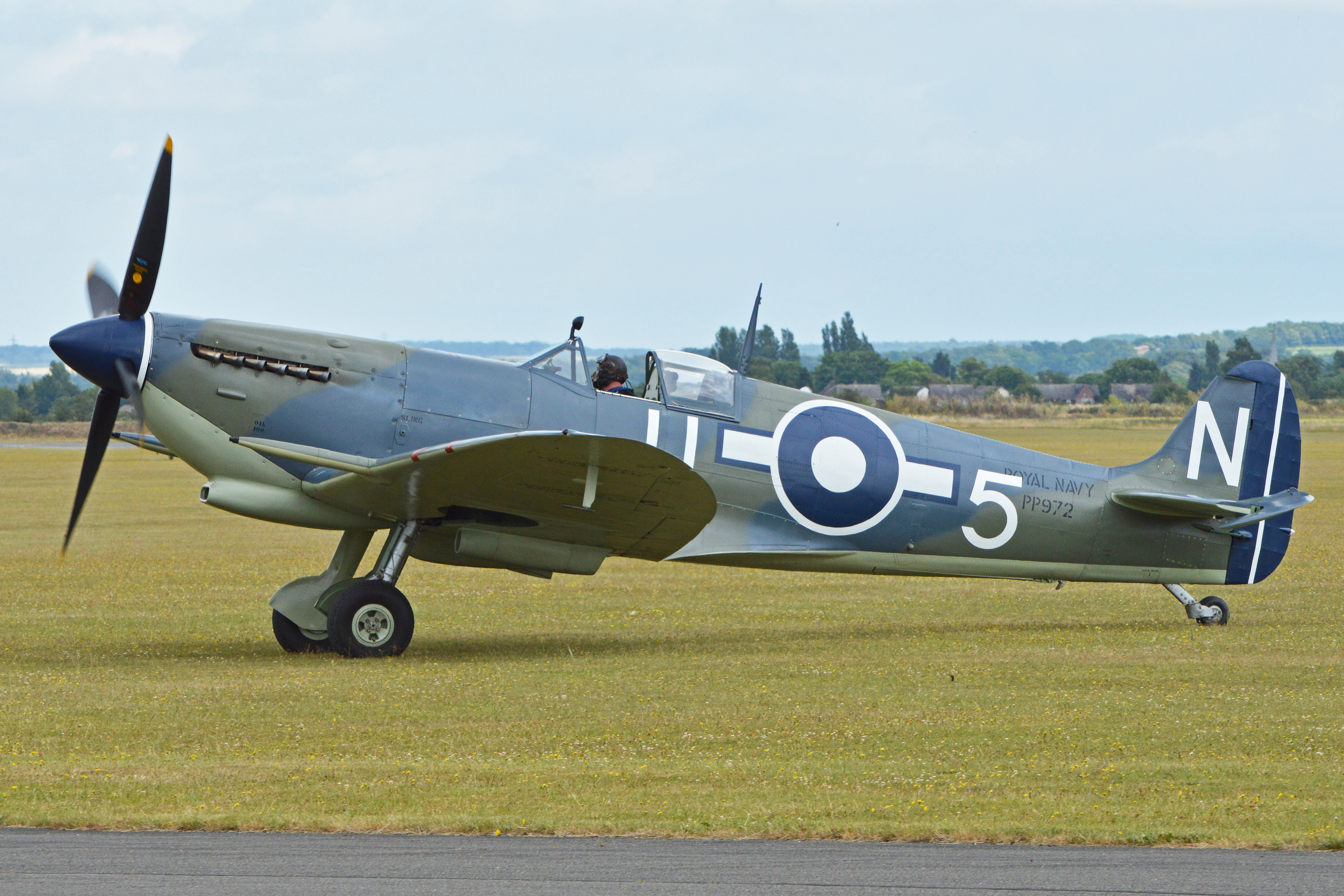
Supermarine Seafire III, 880 Squadron markings, albeit later ones, an example of the type seen at Skeabrae

The Fleet Air Arm returned in February 1944 when 880 Naval Air Squadron arrived from RNAS Ballyhalbert, County Down, on 7 February with Supermarine Seafires, a navalised Supermarine Spitfire. The squadron alternated between periods ashore and embarked service in HMS Furious, undertaking fourteen short deployments between 8 February and 9 September 1944. After a brief move to RNAS Machrihanish, Argyll and Bute, the squadron returned on 27 October before embarking in HMS Implacable on 8 November and disembarking on 29 November. It transferred to RNAS Grimsetter, also on Mainland, Orkney, on 15 January 1945.

No. 118 Squadron established a detachment at RAF Skeabrae in late 1943. In March 1944, the squadron relocated its Supermarine Spitfire Mk.IXCs and Mk.VIIs from RAF Detling, Kent, and remained there until July 1944, before moving back south to RAF Detling. Subsequently, they were succeeded by No. 313 (Czechoslovak) Squadron from RAF Lympne, Kent. In December 1944, the Supermarine Spitfires belonging to No. 441 Squadron arrived for the winter period.

Several short‑term FAA detachments also operated from the station during 1944. A detachment of eight Grumman Wildcats from 881 Naval Air Squadron disembarked from the escort carrier HMS Pursuer on 16 June, re‑embarking on 20 June. 887 Naval Air Squadron visited on 6 July while en route to join HMS Indefatigable. Four Vought Corsairs, an American carrier-borne fighter-bomber, from 1841 Naval Air Squadron disembarked from HMS Formidable on 14 August, re‑embarking on 18 August. 887 Naval Air Squadron returned from HMS Indefatigable on 24 September before moving to RNAS Grimsetter in preparation for joining HMS Implacable on 16 October. Detachments of four Fairey Barracudas, a British carrier-borne torpedo and dive bomber, from 841 Naval Air Squadron, based at RNAS Hatston made four overnight visits between 15 October and 7 November 1944.

The final Fleet Air Arm unit to operate from the station was 881 Naval Air Squadron, which relocated from RNAS Grimsetter on 28 January 1945. The squadron embarked in the escort carrier HMS Puncher on 9 February, disembarked on 14 February, re‑embarked on 17 February, and returned to the station on 25 February. It moved to RNAS Hatston on 2 March 1945.

The Royal Navy section was borne on the books of Sparrowhawk from May 1944, although the final squadrons assigned to the defence of Scapa Flow at RAF Skeabrae included No. 451 Squadron RAAF, which arrived on 17 May 1945 with Supermarine Spitfire Mk.XVI. The squadron departed for RAF Lasham, Hampshire, on 12 June 1945, and was replaced by No. 603 Squadron, operating Supermarine Spitfire LF Mk.XVIE aircraft, which remained until the end of July. Following the end of the war, the airfield was transferred to Admiralty control and maintained as a station in reserve and was later commissioned as HMS Tern II on 15 September 1945. By September 1946, it was borne on the books of Fulmar.

== Units ==
The following units were here at some point:

Royal Air Force squadrons

- No. 3 Squadron RAF (1941)
- No. 66 Squadron RAF (1943)
- No. 118 Squadron RAF (1944)
- No. 129 Squadron RAF (1943)
- No. 132 Squadron RAF (1942)
- No. 164 Squadron RAF (1942)
- No. 234 Squadron RAF (1943)
- No. 253 Squadron RAF (1941)
- No. 312 (Czechoslovak) Squadron RAF (1943)
- No. 313 Squadron RAF (1944)
- No. 329 Squadron RAF (1945)
- No. 331 Squadron RAF (1941-42)
- No. 441 Squadron RCAF (1944-45)
- No. 451 Squadron RAAF
- No. 453 Squadron RAAF (1943-44)
- No. 598 Squadron RAF
- No. 602 Squadron RAF (1942-43 & 1944)
- No. 603 Squadron RAF
- No. 611 Squadron RAF (1944)

Units

- Advanced Ship Recognition Flight RAF (January - February 1943) became No. 1476 (Advanced Ship Recognition) Flight RAF (February - June 1943 & June - January 1944)
- No. 1491 (Fighter Gunnery) Flight RAF (November 1942 - August 1943)
- 1841 Naval Air Squadron
- No. 2714 Squadron RAF Regiment
- No. 2745 Squadron RAF Regiment
- No. 2766 Squadron RAF Regiment
- No. 2824 Squadron RAF Regiment

Royal Navy squadrons

The following Royal Navy units were here at some point:

- 801 Naval Air Squadron
- 804 Naval Air Squadron
- 841 Naval Air Squadron
- 880 Naval Air Squadron
- 881 Naval Air Squadron
- 882 Naval Air Squadron
- 884 Naval Air Squadron
- 887 Naval Air Squadron
- 894 Naval Air Squadron

== Current use ==
It was proposed that the airfield might be combined with RNAS Twatt to create a substantial NATO base; however, Iceland was ultimately selected as the site instead. Skeabrae had a range of hangars and other structures. A significant number of these remained intact until the 1970s and 1980s, when extensive demolition activities commenced. For instance, the control tower was taken down in February 1990. The former bomb storage facility and the cinema and gymnasium are among the few buildings still standing at the airfield, while the runways have been nearly completely dismantled.

== See also ==
- List of former Royal Air Force stations
- List of air stations of the Royal Navy
