= RNAS Twatt =

Former Royal Naval Air Station in Orkney, Scotland

RNAS Twatt (HMS Tern)
- Twatt, on the Mainland of Orkney; Near Stromness, Orkney, in Scotland
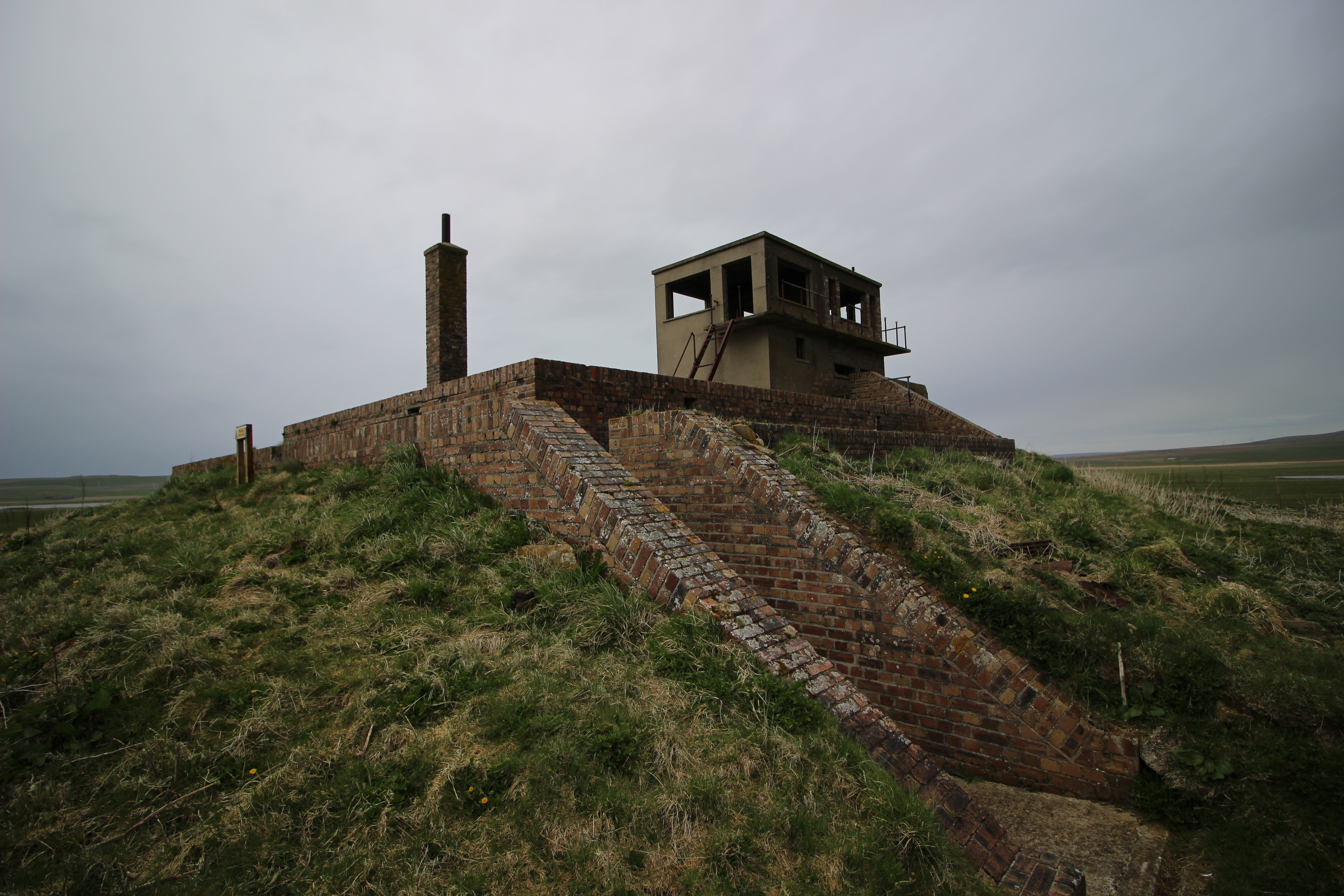
- Remains of Twatt Control Tower, 2018

- HMS Tern

Site information
- Type: Royal Naval Air Station
- Code: T
- Owner: Admiralty
- Operator: Royal Navy
- Controlled by: Fleet Air Arm
- Condition: Closed

Location
- Shown within Orkney RNAS Twatt (the United Kingdom)
- Coordinates: 59°05′16″N 3°17′02″W
- Grid reference: HY265230
- Area: 564 acres (228 ha)

Site history
- Built: 1941
- In use: 1941–1946 (Care & maintenance until 1957)
- Fate: Open land
- Battles/wars: European theatre of World War II

Garrison information
- Garrison: Fleet Air Arm
- Occupants: Accommodation for disembarked Front-Line squadrons; H.Q. 700 Squadron (Accommodation for disembarked Ship's Flight Aircraft); 771 squadron (Home Fleet Fleet Requirements Unit)

Airfield information
- Elevation: 20 metres (66 ft) AMSL
Runways
Direction	Length and surface
04/22	914 metres (2,999 ft) Asphalt concrete
10/28	940 metres (3,084 ft) Asphalt concrete
14/32	1,095 metres (3,593 ft) Asphalt concrete
18/36	914 metres (2,999 ft) Asphalt concrete

Royal Naval Air Station Twatt, (RNAS Twatt; or HMS Tern) is a former military airfield, located near Twatt, Orkney, Scotland, of the Royal Navy. It was built by the Admiralty and was commissioned on 1 April 1941 (on books of HMS Sparrowhawk). On 1 January 1942 it became an independent command as HMS Tern. The naval air station was designed to provide accommodation for disembarked Front-Line squadrons and accommodation for disembarked Ship's Flight Aircraft and was home to the Home Fleet's Fleet Requirements Unit, 771 Naval Air Squadron.

The airbase is situated near two notable landmarks, on the south east side of Loch of Isbister, with Brough Head 3.25 miles (5 km) north west. The town of Kirkwall is 12 miles (19 km) south east and the town of Stromness lies 7.5 miles (12 km) to the south.

Twatt was mainly used as a training airfield. On 30 March 1944 initial plans were to make Twatt the only airfield suitable to aid the disembarkation of squadrons of the Home Fleet.

It closed and was ‘paid off’ on 20 October 1945 to care and maintenance, on the books of HMS Owl. During the 1970s it was proposed to merge with nearby RAF Skeabrae to create a large NATO base, but Iceland was chosen instead.

== History ==
=== Construction ===
There was an operational requirement that identified the need for airfields in Shetland, Orkney and Northern Scotland (SOM 358/40) during Spring 1940, with the site at Twatt being surveyed. It was chosen by the Fleet Air Arm (FAA) for use with disembarking squadrons from the Royal Navy's Home Fleet, along with a number of support and facilities squadrons.

The airfield was one of the earliest purpose built naval airfields in Britain. It was situated between two roads on farmland, with Loch of Ibister to its north, and constructed by contractors, along with Royal Marines engineers.

=== Station design ===
It was constructed with four hard runways and associated facilities. The control tower was built on top of the operations block. The main technical area was situated to the south west of the site, with other hangars and dispersal areas spread around the airfield. There were twenty-eight hangars with twenty-one used for the FAA squadrons and seven for storage. The site also had one Aircraft Repair Shed (ARS), which was a Bellman hangar measuring 185 feet (56 m) × 105 feet (32 m) The others we made up of sixteen Mains hangars, each measuring 60 feet (18 m) × 70 feet (21 m) and twelve Skeabrae hangars which measured 60 feet (18 m) × 50 feet (15 m).

Accommodation consisted living quarters at Skogar Camp with additional quarters at Linklater and West Quoys, with capacity for 173 Officers and 7 W.R.N.S. Officers with 965 Chiefs, P.O.s and ratings and 35 W.R.N.S. Chiefs, P.O.s and ratings.

=== Second World War (1939–1945) ===
Various front line Fleet Air Arm squadrons and their associated aircraft used RNAS Twatt for short periods of time after disembarking from Royal Navy aircraft carriers before they anchored in Scapa Flow. Two Fleet Air Arm units did have a more permanent presence at the airbase. 700 Naval Air Squadron (700 NAS), which provided final training for catapult aircraft aircrew before they embarked on their assigned ships, remained at the airbase from June 1942 until disbanding during 1944. 771 Naval Air Squadron (771 NAS), a Fleet Requirements Unit (FRU), arrived from RNAS Hatston (HMS Sparrowhawk) around the same time as 700 NAS arrived and stayed at RNAS Twatt for three years. It operated a number of different aircraft types, undertaking various tasks, supporting the Home Fleet at Scapa Flow.

One of the roles of the airbase was to provide an airfield to a Fleet Requirements Unit, which was tasked with operational training for the Home Fleet, which was based in Scapa Flow.

In July 1942, 771 Naval Air Squadron relocated to RNAS Twatt, from RNAS Hatston (HMS Sparrowhawk), which was also located on Orkney. It brought with it a variety of aircraft including Fairey Swordfish, a biplane torpedo bomber, Hawker Henley, a two-seat target tug, Blackburn Skua, an aircraft carrier-based dive bomber/fighter aircraft, Blackburn Roc, an aircraft carrier-based turret fighter, Bristol Blenheim, a twin-engine light bomber, Gloster Sea Gladiator, a biplane fighter, Vought Chesapeake an American aircraft carrier-based dive bomber, and Martin Maryland, an American light bomber (the squadron and the latter aircraft were directly responsible for starting the chain of events that led to the sinking of the German battleship Bismarck whilst stationed at HMS Sparrowhawk, just prior to moving to HMS Tern).

In the later part of 1942 Boulton Paul Defiant target tug aircraft began to arrive. The converted turret interceptor aircraft supplemented the Blackburn Skua and Blackburn Roc target tugs. From 1943 these three aircraft types were replaced with Miles Martinet which was specifically designed as a target tug aircraft. Douglas Boston medium bomber variants were acquired to operate alongside the twin-engined Bristol Blenheim and Martin Maryland light bombers. All these types exercised the ships of the Home Fleets' and shore-based, anti-aircraft guns and also provide targets for radar practice and calibration. Hawker Hurricane single seat fighter aircraft, provided higher speed targets and these aircraft replaced the Vought Chesapeake dive bombers.

‘A’ Flight of 700 NAS, which was equipped with Supermarine Walrus, a single-engine amphibious biplane, moved to HMS Sparrowhawk and became ‘B’ Flight of 771 NAS, on 24 March 1944. The flight swapped its Supermarine Walrus for Supermarine Sea Otter, a biplane amphibious aircraft. In the following August the flight became 721 Naval Air Squadron. In 1945 the Hawker Hurricane aircraft were replaced with the faster Vought Corsair, an American fighter aircraft. In February of that year the squadron received its first helicopter with the arrival of Hoverfly I, a two-seat helicopter. The squadron operated a detachment at RAF Warmwell, in Dorset, England, from 14 June to 1 August 1945. 771 NAS left RNAS Twatt on 25 July 1945, moving south along with the Home Fleet following VE Day, to RNAS Zeals (HMS Hummingbird), in Wiltshire, England.

700 Naval Air Squadron formed at RNAS Hatston (HMS Sparrowhawk) on 21 January 1940. It moved its HQ the short distance across Mainland, Orkney, to RNAS Twatt (HMS Tern) during June 1942 and at that point the squadron was equipped with sixty-three Supermarine Walrus amphibious biplanes.

At the time the squadron moved its HQ, known as ‘A’ Flight, to RNAS Twatt it provided a ten-week training course for new catapult Flights. The final two weeks of the course were spent attached to ‘A’ Flight at RNAS Twatt for final training, before joining their allocated ship. The training was broken down into an initial three weeks of aerodrome flying, consisting circuits and landings, dive-bombing, photography and anti-submarine warfare, at RNAS Donibristle (HMS Merlin), in Fife. A second three-week block was spent at RNAS Dundee (HMS Condor II), a seaplane base / repair depot, in Dundee, where the focus was on water operations, which included night landings. Week seven was a catapult course aboard HMS Pegasus, a Royal Navy aircraft carrier/seaplane carrier, in the Irish Sea. Week eight was then a return to RNAS Donibristle (HMS Merlin).

As radar was being introduced to Royal Navy capital ships, and with the emergence of the Merchant Aircraft Carrier (MAC ship) and the escort carrier the need for catapult aircraft greatly reduced and by July 1943 the squadron was down to twenty aircraft. 700 NAS disbanded the following year on 24 March 1944, with the remains of 'A' Flight becoming 771 NAS ‘B' Flight at HMS Sparrowhawk.

A number of Fleet Air Arm torpedo bomber reconnaissance squadrons and fighter squadrons spent time at RNAS Twatt (HMS Tern) either working up for deployment, returning from deployment, or passing through between airbases throughout the Second World War.

812 Naval Air Squadron arrived from RNAS Hatston on 25 June 1941. The commanding officer was Lieutenant Commander W. E. Waters, DFC. The squadron was equipped with Fairey Swordfish I and II torpedo bombers, and it worked up for three weeks until 16 July 1941 when it embarked onto the aircraft carrier HMS Furious for Operation EF (1941), which included the raid with 812 Naval Air Squadron on the Finnish port of Liinakhamari in Petsamo.

On 28 July 1941, the Fairey Swordfish I torpedo bombers of 818 Naval Air Squadron arrived at RNAS Twatt from RNAS Arbroath (HMS Condor), after returning from Malta convoy escort on HMS Furious. The stay was short and two weeks later the squadron moved to RNAS Machrihanish (HMS Landrail) on 12 August 1941.

821 Naval Air Squadron, equipped with Fairey Swordfish I, arrived on 12 August 1941 from RNAS Hatston. The squadron had recently reformed and was working up and training. On 5 November 1941 it moved north to RAF Sumburgh after reports that Nazi Germany's Kriegsmarine Bismarck-class battleship Tirpitz was in the area.

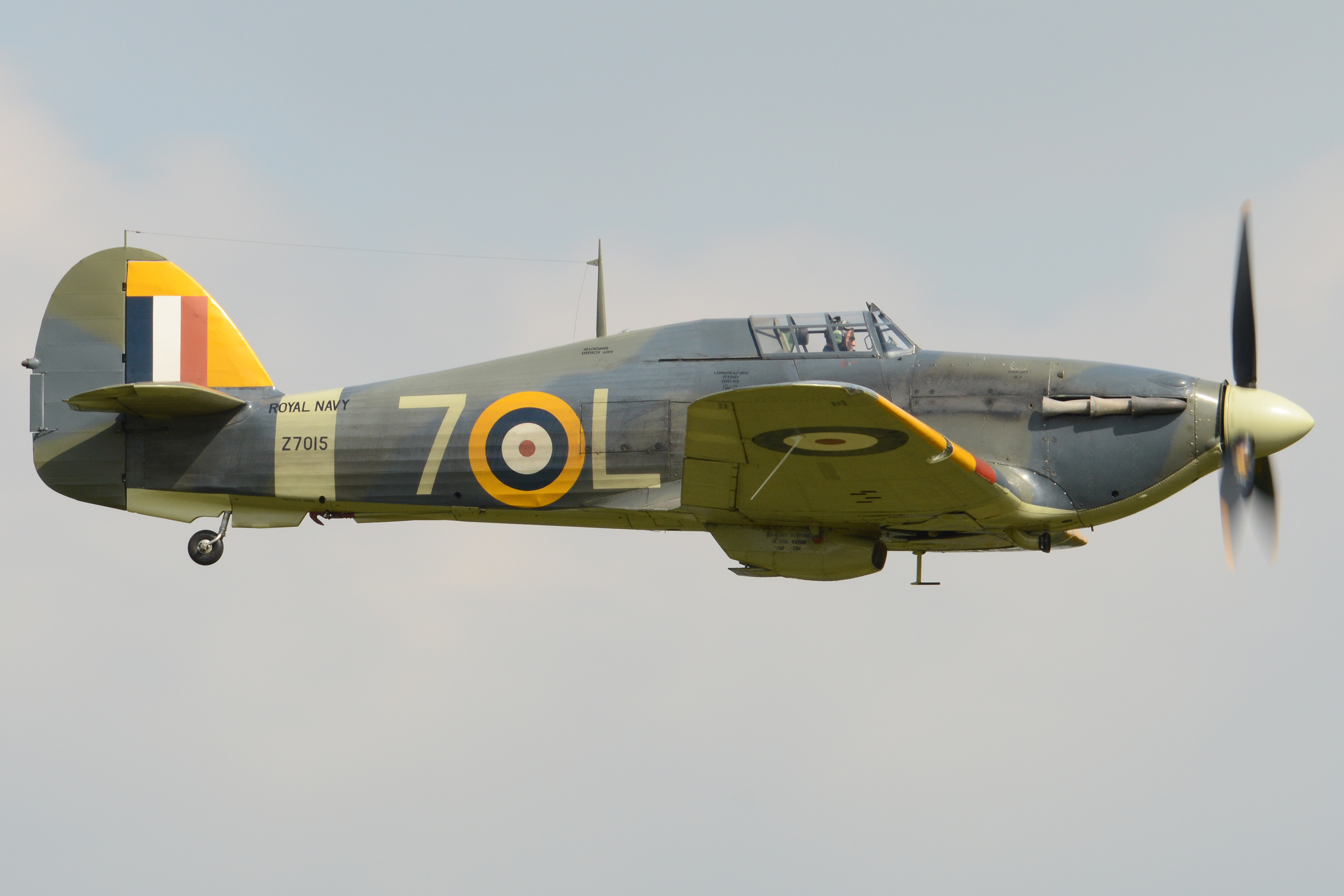
Hawker Sea Hurricane Mk.Ib, in the Fleet Air Arm colours of 880 squadron

Formed as a Fleet Fighter Squadron at the beginning of 1941, 880 Naval Air Squadron moved from RNAS St Merryn (HMS Vulture) on the 14 August 1941. It was equipped with Hawker Sea Hurricane Ib, a navalised version of the Hawker Hurricane single seat fighter aircraft, and was working up for embarkation on HMS Indomitable (92), a modified Illustrious-class aircraft carrier. It left for RAF Sumburgh, located on the mainland island of Shetland, on 15 September 1941 and then onto the aircraft carrier during October.

A Fairey Albacore torpedo bomber detachment from 817 Naval Air Squadron, commanded by Lieutenant Commander Sanderson, DSC, was at RNAS Twatt between 20 and 23 September 1941. It had disembarked from the Illustrious-class aircraft carrier HMS Victorious after operations in the Barents Sea. It embarked back onto HMS Victorious for attacks on shipping in Vestfjorden

Following attacks on shipping around the Lofoten Islands, operating from HMS Victorious, a detachment of 832 Naval Air Squadron Fairey Albacore torpedo bombers stayed at RNAS Twatt between 20 and 23 September 1941. It then returned to HMS Victorious for anti-shipping strikes in the Bodø area.

809 Naval Air Squadron, formed early 1941 as a two-seater Fighter squadron, arrived at RNAS Twatt from HMS Victorious on 26 October 1941, equipped with twelve Fairey Fulmar II, a carrier-borne reconnaissance and fighter aircraft. During the following twelve months the squadron took part in several deployments on Victorious including escorting Arctic convoys to northern ports on the Soviet Union and anti-shipping strikes in the Bodø area of Norway. One other notable sortie, during March 1942 809 Naval Air Squadron escorted the Fairey Albacore of 817 and 832 Naval Air Squadrons on an attack on the Tirpitz. On 22 July 1942 809 NAS embarked onto Victorious, for the final time from the Orkney airbase, before moving south to RNAS St Merryn (HMS Vulture), in Cornwall, England.

819 Naval Air Squadron arrived from RNAS Crail (HMS Jackdaw), in Fife, on 27 January 1942. It operated with nine Fairey Swordfish I torpedo bomber. The squadron was working up for eventual embarkment on the Avenger-class escort carrier HMS Avenger, and it left after around four weeks later making the short journey to RNAS Hatston (HMS Sparrowhawk), as part of working up, on 22 February 1942.

822 Naval Air Squadron, operating with Fairey Albacore torpedo bomber, moved from RNAS Machrihanish (HMS Landrail) on 27 September 1942. It remained at RNAS Twatt for almost three weeks before returning to the airbase HMS Landrail, on 16 October 1942, where it embarked onto the aircraft carrier HMS Furious for operations, two days later.

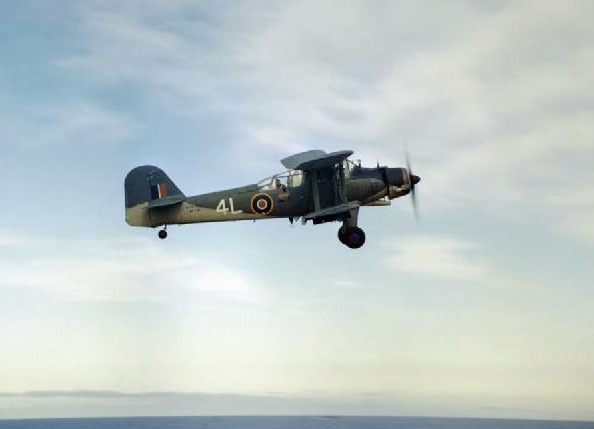
A Fairey Albacore Mk I of 820 Naval Air Squadron

820 Naval Air Squadron passed through RNAS Twatt between 2 and 10 October 1942. The squadron was equipped with Fairey Albacore biplane torpedo bombers. It was working up when it left for RNAS Hatston, on its way to embark onto the Illustrious-class aircraft carrier HMS Formidable to support with the North African landings, on 21 October. The carrier was assigned to Force H for Operation Torch, where two of 820 Naval Air Squadron Fairey Albacore torpedoed and sank the German submarine U-331.

884 Naval Air Squadron, a Fleet Fighter squadron, arrived at RNAS Twatt, disembarking from HMS Victorious, on 23 November 1942. Equipped with Supermarine Seafire IIc, a navalised version of the Supermarine Spitfire single seat fighter aircraft, it then supported Nos 13 and 14 Groups with fighter defence, moving to RAF Turnhouse, located in Edinburgh, on 14 December 1942.

Hawker Sea Hurricane equipped 804 Naval Air Squadron, a fighter squadron, arrived at RNAS Twatt on 8 February 1943, from RAF Ouston, in Northumberland, England, having been a lodger unit there. It provided a detachment for the Avenger class escort carrier HMS Dasher, between 15 and 26 February, to RNAS Hatston and then back to RNAS Twatt on 24 February, before moving south to RNAS Charlton Horethorne (HMS Heron II), in Somerset, England, on 6 April 1943.

=== Post VE day ===
With Germany's unconditional surrender of its armed forces on Tuesday, 8 May 1945 and the disbandment of the catapult training unit, 700 NAS, the previous year, the airbase saw a lot less activity. A couple of FAA squadrons passed through shortly after VE Day and the Fleet Requirements Unit remained at RNAS Twatt until July 1945.

802 Naval Air Squadron relocated from RNAS Arbroath on 21 June 1945. It had reformed the previous month and was equipped with two variants of Supermarine Seafire. The squadron continued its operational work-up before leaving for RNAS Ayr (HMS Wagtail) on 18 July 1945, readying for eventual deployment on the Ruler-class escort carrier HMS Queen for the British Pacific Fleet. It was planned to form part of the Fleet Air Arms 9th Carrier Air Group. The formation was cancelled following V-J Day.

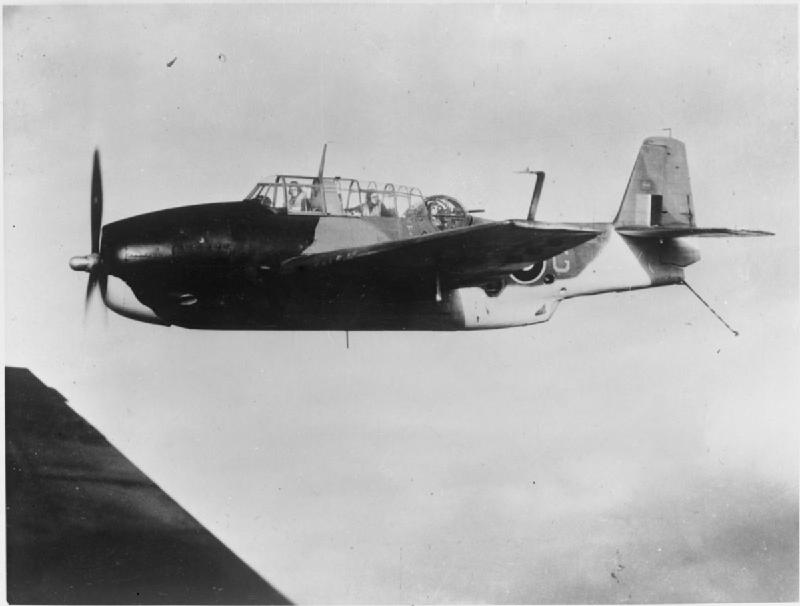
A Grumman Avenger 846 Naval Air Squadron

On 20 July 1945 the Grumman Avenger II equipped 846 Naval Air Squadron moved from RNAS Hatston. It was planned to form part of the Fleet Air Arms 4th Carrier Air Group within the British Pacific Fleet, for the lead ship of her class HMS Illustrious, however, the formation was cancelled following Victory over Japan Day. The squadron moved to RNAS Crail (HMS Jackdaw) on 1 September 1945.

== Units ==
The following units were here at some point:

- 700 Naval Air Squadron
- 771 Naval Air Squadron
- 802 Naval Air Squadron
- 804 Naval Air Squadron
- 807 Naval Air Squadron
- 809 Naval Air Squadron
- 812 Naval Air Squadron
- 817 Naval Air Squadron
- 818 Naval Air Squadron
- 819 Naval Air Squadron
- 820 Naval Air Squadron
- 821 Naval Air Squadron
- 822 Naval Air Squadron
- 832 Naval Air Squadron
- 846 Naval Air Squadron
- 880 Naval Air Squadron
- 884 Naval Air Squadron

== See also ==
- Military history of Scotland
- Naval air station
