= 884 Naval Air Squadron =

Inactive flying squadron of the Royal Navy's Fleet Air Arm

- Squadron badge
- Active: 1941 –1943
- Disbanded: 20 July 1943
- Country: United Kingdom
- Branch: Royal Navy
- Type: Single-seat fighter squadron
- Role: Fleet fighter squadron
- Part of: Fleet Air Arm
- Home station: See Naval air stations section for full list.
- Engagements: World War II: Operation Pedestal; Operation Torch
- Battle honours: Malta Convoys 1942; North Africa 1942

Insignia
- Squadron Badge Description: Blue, issuant from water in base barry wavy of six white and blue a cubit arm in bend armed proper winged gold grasping a battleaxe blade uppermost proper ( 1942)
- Identification Markings: uncoded (Fulmar) uncoded (Spitfire); 8A+ (Seafire)

Aircraft flown
- Fighter: Fairey Fulmar; Supermarine Seafire; Supermarine Spitfire

884 Naval Air Squadron (884 NAS), is an inactive Fleet Air Arm (FAA) naval air squadron of the United Kingdom’s Royal Navy (RN), which last disbanded in July 1943. It formed a RNAS Donibristle, as a Fleet Fighter squadron, in November 1941. The squadron supported RAF Fighter Command by offering fighter protection and engaged in various operations, including efforts to alleviate the Siege of Malta and the Allied invasion of French North Africa. It operated Fairey Fulmar Mk.II reconnaissance/fighter aircraft, Supermarine Spitfire Mk Va, Vb and Vb/hooked fighter aircraft and Supermarine Seafire F Mk.IIc fighter aircraft.

== History ==
=== Fleet fighter squadron (1941–1943) ===
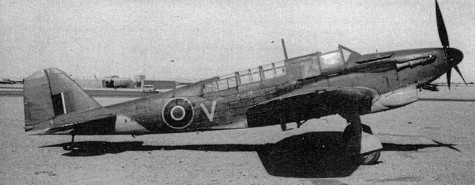
Fairey Fulmar Mk.II; an example of the type used by 884 Squadron

884 Naval Air Squadron formed at RNAS Donibristle (HMS Merlin), Fife, on 1 November 1941 as a Fleet Fighter squadron. It was initially equipped with six Fairey Fulmar Mk.II, a carrier-based reconnaissance and fighter aircraft.

The squadron was intended to embark on Avenger-class escort carrier HMS Biter, but after working up it operated as part of No. 13 Group RAF in Fighter Command, from 22 March 1942. It was based at RAF Turnhouse, in Edinburgh, Scotland, but moved to RAF Peterhead, Aberdeenshire, before returning to RAF Turnhouse.

The squadron returned to the Fleet Air Arm on 21 July at RNAS Hatston (HMS Sparrowhawk), Mainland, Orkney, and then embarked in the Illustrious-class aircraft carrier HMS Victorious to help provide fighter cover for the Malta convoy Operation Pedestal.

884 Naval Air Squadron returned to the United Kingdom but was back with the Royal Air Force at RAF Skeabrae, Mainland, Orkney. Its Fairey Fulmar were replaced by hooked Supermarine Spitfire fighter aircraft and it also converted to Supermarine Seafire, a navalised Spitfire, however, the squadron re-embarked to provide fighter cover during Operation Torch, the Allied invasion of French North Africa.

It then returned to fighter defence with Nos. 13 and 14 Groups in Fighter Command, operating from various Royal Air Force stations around Scotland, before disbanding at RNAS Machrihanish (HMS Landrail), on 20 July 1943.

There was a proposed 22nd Carrier Air Group for the British Pacific Fleet in 1945 and it was intended to use a reformed 884 Naval Air Squadron with twenty-one Supermarine Seafire as part of its make-up, however, it wasn’t required following V-J Day.

== Aircraft operated ==
The squadron has operated a number of different aircraft types, including:

- Fairey Fulmar Mk.II reconnaissance/fighter aircraft (November 1941 - September 1942)
- Supermarine Spitfire Mk Va fighter aircraft (September - October 1942)
- Supermarine Spitfire Mk Vb fighter aircraft (September - October 1942)
- Supermarine Spitfire Mk Vb/hooked fighter aircraft (September - October 1942)
- Supermarine Seafire F Mk.IIc fighter aircraft (September 1942 - July 1943)

== Battle honours ==
The battle honours awarded to 884 Naval Air Squadron are:

- Malta Convoys 1942
- North Africa 1942

== Naval air stations and aircraft carriers ==
884 Naval Air Squadron operated from a number of naval air stations of the Royal Navy, and Royal Air Force stations in the UK, and a Royal Navy fleet carrier:

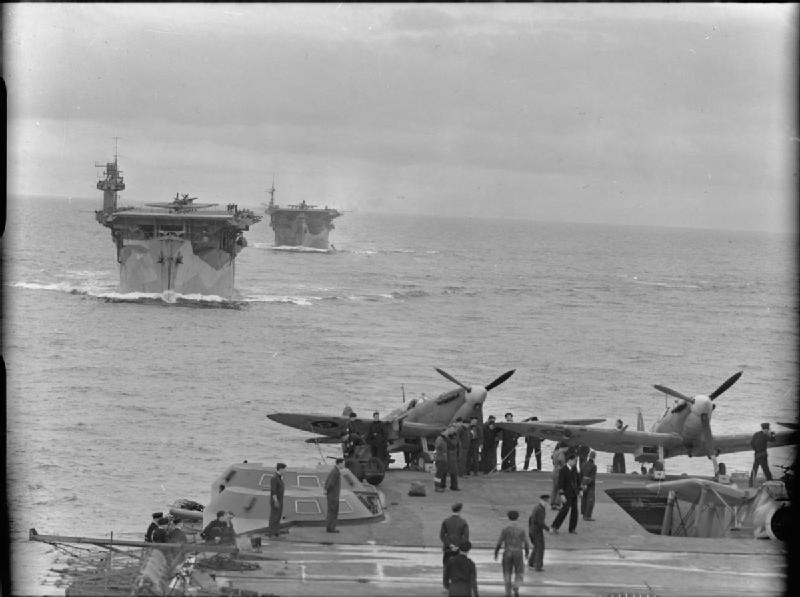
HMS Biter and HMS Avenger underway in line astern from HMS Victorious. Two Supermarine Seafire aircraft of No 884 Squadron, Fleet Air Arm can be seen at the far end of the flight deck of HMS Victorious.

- Royal Naval Air Station Donibristle (HMS Merlin), Fife, (1 November 1941 - 1 January 1942)
- Royal Naval Air Station St Merryn (HMS Vulture), Cornwall, (1 January - 7 February 1942)
- Royal Naval Air Station Yeovilton (HMS Heron), Somerset, (7 February - 22 March 1942)
- Royal Air Force Turnhouse, Edinburgh, (13 Gp) (22 March - 6 July 1942)
- Royal Air Force Peterhead, Aberdeenshire, (13 Gp) (6 - 11 July 1942)
- Royal Air Force Turnhouse (13 Gp), Edinburgh, (11 - 21 July 1942)
- Royal Naval Air Station Hatston (HMS Sparrowhawk), Mainland, Orkney, (21 - 23 July 1942)
- HMS Victorious (23 July - 21 August 1942)
- Royal Naval Air Station Lee-on-Solent (HMS Daedalus), Hampshire, (21 August - 25 September 1942)
- Royal Air Force Skeabrae, Mainland, Orkney, (14 Gp) (25 September - 22 October 1942)
- HMS Victorious (22 October - 23 November 1942)
- Royal Naval Air Station Twatt (HMS Tern), Mainland, Orkney, (23 - 25 November 1942)
- Royal Air Force Skeabrae, Mainland, Orkney, (14 Gp) (25 November - 14 December 1942)
- Royal Air Force Turnhouse, Edinburgh, (13 Gp) (14 December 1942 - 24 March 1943)
- Royal Naval Air Station Machrihanish (HMS Landrail), Argyll and Bute, (13 Gp) (24 - 25 March 1943)
- HMS Argus (Deck Landing Training (DLT) 25 March - 10 April 1943)
- Royal Air Force Drem, East Lothian, (13 Gp) (10 - 30 April 1943)
- Royal Air Force Grimsetter, Mainland, Orkney, (30 April - 11 May 1943)
- Royal Air Force Turnhouse, Edinburgh, (13 Gp) (11 May - 16 July 1943)
- Royal Naval Air Station Machrihanish (HMS Landrail), Argyll and Bute, (16 - 20 July 1943)
- disbanded - (20 July 1943)

== Commanding officers ==
List of commanding officers of 884 Naval Air Squadron:

- Lieutenant Commander N.G. Hallett, RN, from 1 November 1941
- Lieutenant Commander T.B. Winstanley, RN, from 20 March 1943
- disbanded - 20 July 1943
