= 700 Naval Air Squadron =

Remotely-piloted air system squadron of the Royal Navy's Fleet Air Arm

700X Naval Air Squadron
- Squadron Badge
- Active: 1940–1944; 1944–1949; 1955–1961; 1998–2008; 2009–2014; 2014–present
- Country: United Kingdom
- Branch: Royal Navy
- Type: Fleet Air Arm Second Line Squadron
- Role: Ship's Flight Aircraft (H.Q.); Maintenance Test Pilot's School; Trials and Requirements Unit; Intensive Flying Trails Unit; Operational Test and Evaluation Remotely Piloted Air Systems
- Part of: Fleet Air Arm
- Home station: RNAS Culdrose
- Mottos: Experientia docet (Latin for 'Experiences teaches')
- Aircraft: RQ-20 Puma; Peregrine rotary-wing UAV; Malloy Aeronautics T150; "Walrus Quadcopter" light reconnaissance/surveillance UAV
- Website: Official website

Commanders
- Current commander: Lieutenant Commander Steve Cooke, RN

Insignia
- Squadron badge Description: Per fess blue and barry wavy of four white and blue, a pair of scales gold in chief two bees displayed proper (1958)

700 Naval Air Squadron (700 NAS), known as 700X Naval Air Squadron (700X NAS), or 700X Squadron, is a Fleet Air Arm (FAA) Maritime Unmanned Air System squadron of the United Kingdom's Royal Navy (RN). 'X' is used to designate 'experimental', it is currently the Royal Navy's Remotely-piloted air systems (RPAS) expert unit.

Headquartered at RNAS Culdrose, 700X Squadron has established Predannack Airfield as a facility for training and testing RPAS and their operators.

The squadron comprises deployable flights that utilise the RQ-20 Puma Unmanned aerial vehicle (UAV) for surveillance purposes. Additionally, 700X NAS instructs teams of Royal Marine Commandos in the operation of Puma for reconnaissance missions.

Furthermore, the squadron operates deployable flights equipped with Malloy T-150 heavy lift vertical take-off and landing (VTOL) UAVs, capable of transporting supplies. Additionally Flights from 700X Squadron employ the Peregrine rotorcraft UAV, a remote-piloted system, to deliver all-weather surveillance, tracking, and target identification both day and night.

Moreover, 700X Naval Air Squadron offers training across the Defence sector in the operation of RPAS and quadcopters.

== History ==
=== Catapult flights (1940-1944) ===
700 Naval Air Squadron was originally formed on 21 January 1940 at RNAS Hatston (HMS Sparrowhawk) in Orkney in a plan to centralise the operations of the 700 series "Catapult" flights attached to catapult units and to act as a pool and Headquarters for all catapult aircraft embarked on Royal Navy battleships and cruisers. It was initially equipped with forty-two Supermarine Walrus flying boats, together with eleven Fairey Seafox and twelve Fairey Swordfish floatplanes.

On 21 June 1940, a Walrus (P5666) of 700 Squadron on the cruiser HMS Manchester found the German battleship Scharnhorst but Manchester did not engage.

From July, the squadron absorbed small number of Supermarine Walrus operated from RAF Sullom Voe, designated as the Shetland Flight, with aircraft and crews from RNAS Hatston and disembarked Flights from the Home Fleet. These carried out local anti-submarine patrols and shipping escort under the control of No. 18 Group RAF, within RAF Coastal Command. On 25 September 1940, Supermarine Walrus L2247, embarked on the cruiser HMAS Australia, was shot down by Vichy French fighters during the Battle of Dakar and crashed into the sea killing all three crew.

In November the squadron took over the 701 Naval Air Squadron aircraft which were operating from Stornoway harbour and this became known as 700 Stornoway Flight. In March 1941 this Flight moved to RAF Sullom Voe and joined the Shetland Flight, but this then disbanded in May when RAF aircraft became available. Trailing Kriegsmarine capital ships in the lead up to the Battle of the Denmark Strait, Supermarine Walrus L2184 of 700 Naval Air Squadron from HMS Norfolk was damaged by shellfire from Prinz Eugen in the Denmark Strait on 23 May 1941 while still on its catapult.

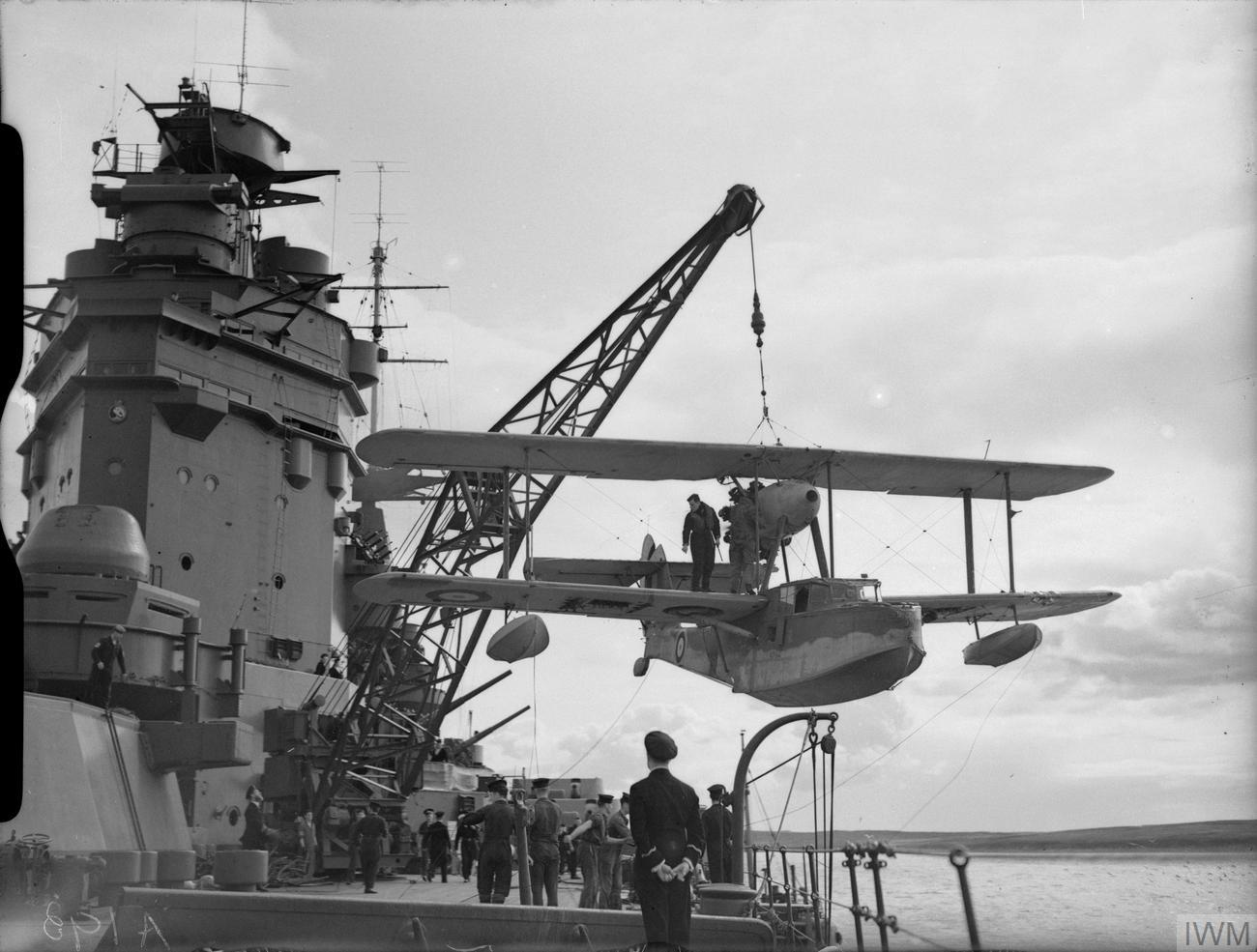
Lowering of the Supermarine Walrus aircraft for a reconnaissance flight on the British battleship HMS Rodney

In June 1942, 700 Naval Air Squadron moved its HQ, known as ‘A’ Flight, the short distance across Orkney to RNAS Twatt (HMS Tern). By this time the squadron provided a ten-week training course for new catapult Flights. The final two weeks of the course were spent attached to ‘A’ Flight at for final training, before joining their allocated ship.

The training was broken down into an initial three weeks of aerodrome flying, at RNAS Donibristle (HMS Merlin), in Fife, consisting circuits and landings, dive-bombing, photography and anti-submarine warfare. A second three-week block was spent at RNAS Dundee (HMS Condor II), a seaplane base / repair depot, in Dundee, where the focus was on water operations, which included night landings. Week seven was a catapult course aboard HMS Pegasus, a Royal Navy aircraft carrier/seaplane carrier, in the Irish Sea. Week eight was then a return to RNAS Donibristle (HMS Merlin).

The final successful attack on an enemy submarine by a Walrus was on 11 July 1942, when Walrus W2709 of 700 (Levant) NAS sank the Italian submarine Ondina near Cypris in conjunction with the South African navy surface vessels HMSAS Protea and HMSAS Southern Maid, east of Cyprus.

There were at least 5 confirmed enemy submarines sunk or damaged by Walruses during the Second World War, including the Vichy French submarine Poncelet which was bombed by Walrus L2268 of 700 NAS from HMS Devonshire and attacked by HMS Milford on 7 November 1940 off the Cameroons. The submarine was damaged and forced to surrender, and later scuttled off the Gulf of Guinea. The crew of Petty Officer P.H. Parsons, Sub Lieutenant A.D. Corkhill and N.A. Evans were all awarded gallantry medals.

By the middle of 1943 the squadron strength was down to twenty aircraft as radar made catapult launched aircraft unnecessary. What was left of A' Flight became 'B' Flight of 771 Naval Air Squadron at RNAS Hatston and 700 Naval Air Squadron disbanded on 24 March 1944.

=== Maintenance Test Pilot's School (1944-1949) ===
700 Naval Air Squadron reformed on 11 November 1944 as the Maintenance Test Pilot Training Squadron at RNAS Donibristle (HMS Merlin). It later moved to RNAS Worthy Down (HMS Kestrel), Hampshire, and became part of the School of Aircraft Maintenance, operating with the torpedo bomber aircraft Grumman Avenger and Fairey Barracuda, the Blackburn Firebrand strike fighter, and the navalised fighter aircraft: Fairey Firefly, Grumman Hellcat, Supermarine Seafire, and Grumman Wildcat.

It provided a training course which required each pilot to complete a minimum of five weeks test flying on FAA aircraft in active service and during the initial eleven months eighty-four test pilots were trained. Remaining in Hampshire, the squadron moved to RNAS Middle Wallop (HMS Flycatcher), on 23 November 1945. It moved again the following April when it 1946 the squadron relocated to RNAS Yeovilton (HMS Heron), Somerset and where in May 1948 it became part of the 50th Training Air Group. 700 Maintenance Test Pilots training Squadron disbanded in September 1949.

=== Trials and Requirements Unit (1955-1961) ===
700 Naval Air Squadron reformed as a Trials and Requirements Unit on 18 August 1955 at RNAS Ford (HMS Peregrine), West Sussex. It was equipped with the multirole training aircraft Avro Anson, Fairey Firefly TT.4 target tug, de Havilland Sea Vampire F.20 fighter-bomber, Hawker Sea Hawk day fighter, Westland Wyvern strike aircraft and Fairey Gannet anti-submarine aircraft. 703 STU and 771 FRU had disbanded at RNAS Ford the previous day and they were successfully combined to form 700 Trials and Requirements Unit. One month later, on 19 September the squadron moved to RNAS Yeovilton (HMS Heron). In January 1956, when 787 Naval Air Squadron disbanded, 700 NAS took over its duties, however, in February 1957 the Fleet Requirements work was given to Airwork Services Ltd at Hurn. The squadron moved to RNAS Yeovilton in September 1958 where it later disbanded in July 1961.

The Squadron carried on trials of de Havilland Sea Vixens on HMS Victorious and HMS Centaur during 1958 and from October 1959 formed at Yeovilton with the Saunders Roe P.531 to investigate what would be needed to introduce a whole new form of helicopter operation to the Fleet – which led to the Westland Wasp.

In October 1960 flight tests of landing and take-offs from HMS Vengeance with 27 launchings of the turboprop Fairey Gannet and 34 with the Hawker Sea Hawk.

=== Intensive Flying Trials Units (IFTU) ===
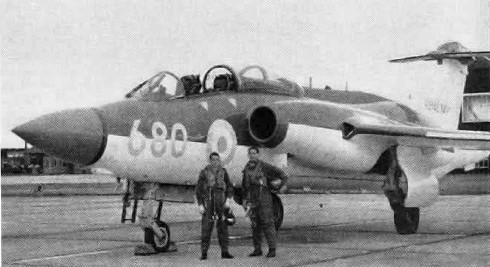
A 700Z Naval Air Squadron Buccaneer S.1 at RNAS Lossiemouth in 1961.

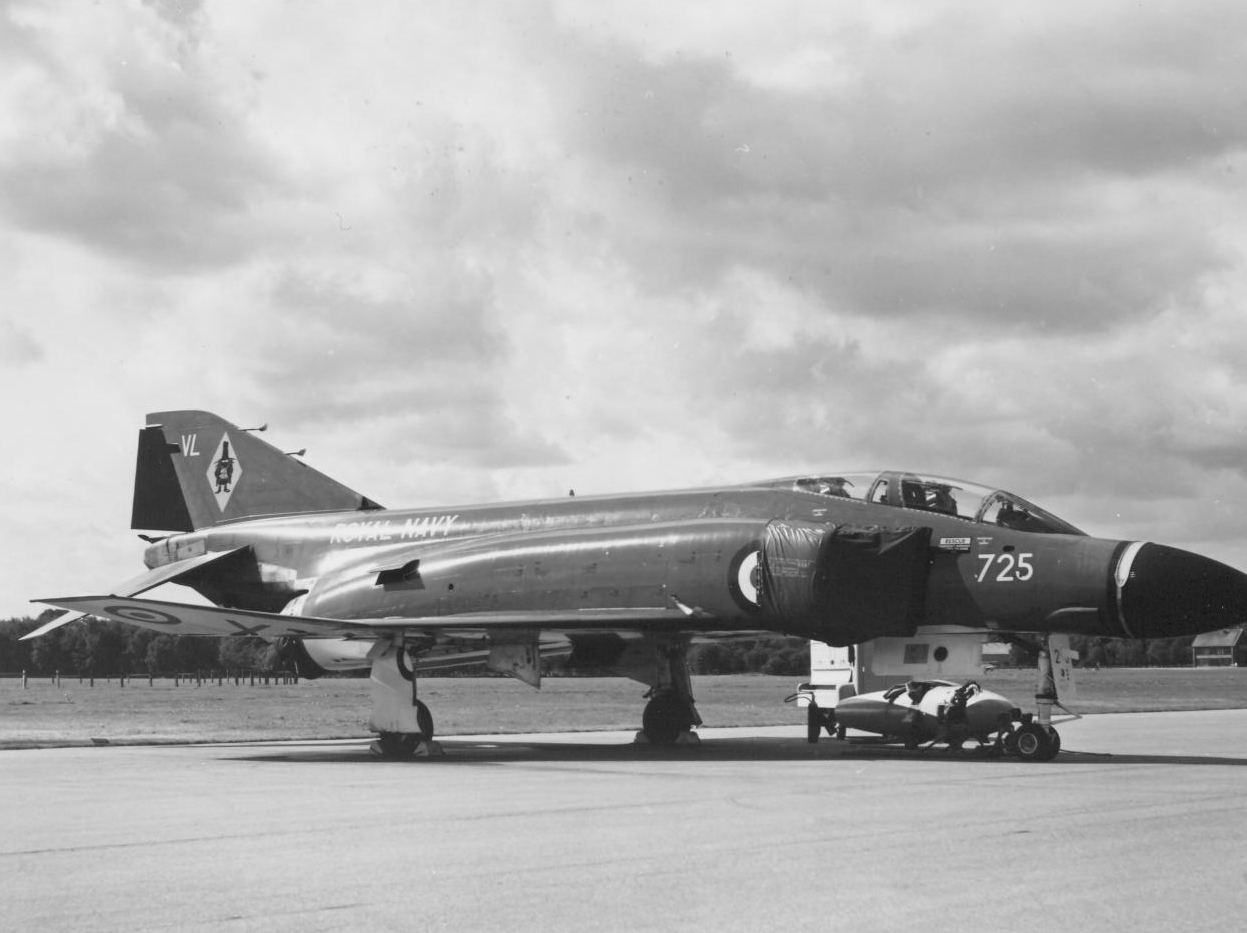
A Phantom FG.1 of 700P Naval Air Squadron

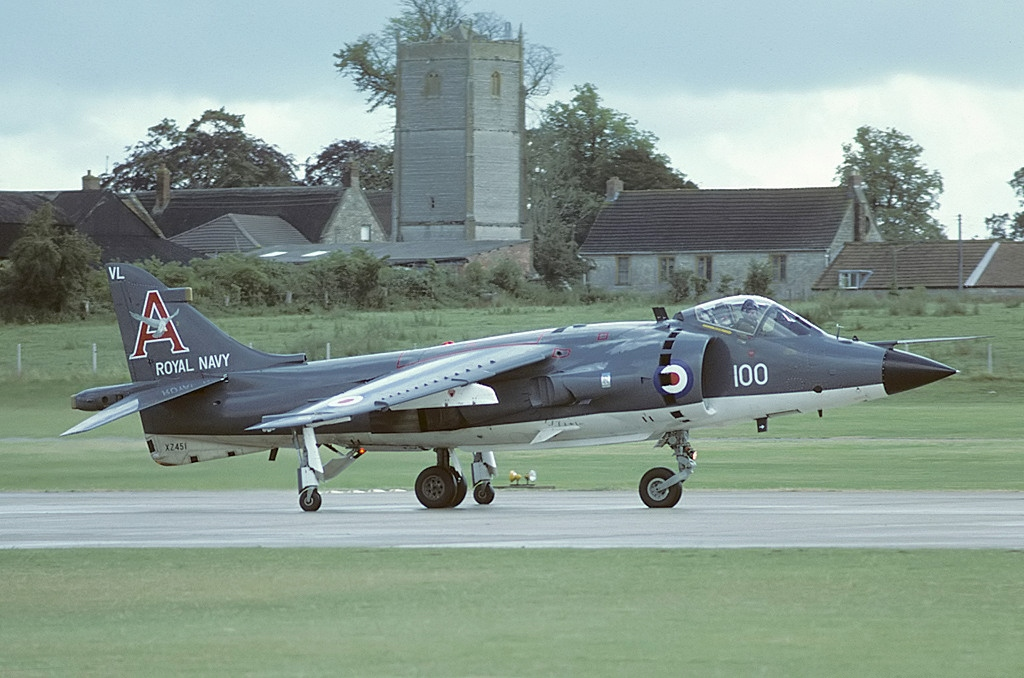
The first British Aerospace Sea Harrier FRS1, of the resident trials unit 700A Naval Air Squadron

A series of Intensive Flying Trials Units (IFTUs) and Operational Evaluation Units (OEUs) designated under the 700 Naval Air Squadron title were formed by the Fleet Air Arm from the late 1950s onwards to introduce and assess new aircraft types. These operated as independent units, each being identified by a suffix letter after the squadron number (e.g. "700B").

700H was first established at RNAS Lee-on-Solent, Hampshire, in March 1957 to conduct trials with the Westland Whirlwind HAS.7, disbanding later that year in September. This was followed by 700X, formed at RNAS Ford, West Sussex, in August 1957 to evaluate the Supermarine Scimitar F.1 until its disbandment in May 1958. 700Y operated from RNAS Yeovilton, Somerset, between November 1958 and July 1959, undertaking trials with the de Havilland Sea Vixen FAW.1. A second incarnation of 700H was created at RNAS Culdrose, Cornwall, in June 1959 to continue Whirlwind HAS.7 trials, disbanding in August 1959. It was followed by 700G, formed at Culdrose in August 1959 to introduce the Fairey Gannet AEW.3, remaining active until February 1960. 700H re‑formed again in April 1960, this time to trial the Westland Wessex HAS.1, operating from Culdrose until January 1962.

Further fixed‑wing trials were undertaken by 700Z, established at RNAS Lossiemouth, Moray, in March 1961 to evaluate the Blackburn Buccaneer S.1, before disbanding in January 1963. Rotary‑wing development continued with 700W, formed at Culdrose in June 1963 to introduce the Westland Wasp HAS.1 and disbanded in 4 March 1964. Shortly afterwards 700V was created at the same air station in 29 October 1963 to trial the Westland Wessex HU.5, disbanding in May 1964. Lossiemouth again hosted Buccaneer trials when 700B formed in April 1965 to evaluate the Buccaneer S.2, until its disbandment in September 1965. 700H re‑formed once more at Culdrose in January 1967 to introduce the Wessex HAS.3, disbanding in September 1967. The Fleet Air Arm’s transition to modern jet fighters was marked by 700P, established at Yeovilton in April 1968 to conduct trials with the McDonnell Douglas Phantom FG.1, operating until March 1969.

The introduction of new anti‑submarine helicopters saw 700S formed at Culdrose in July 1969 to trial the Westland Sea King HAS.1, disbanding in May 1970. Later, 700L was established at Yeovilton in September 1976 to evaluate the Westland Lynx HAS.2 and Dutch SH‑14A Lynx Mk.25, remaining active until December 1977. The arrival of the Fleet Air Arm’s first V/STOL fighter led to 700A, which formed at Yeovilton in June 1979 to introduce the Sea Harrier FRS.1, disbanding in March 1980. Trials activity continued into the 1990s with 700L re‑formed at RNAS Portland, Dorset, in July 1990 as an OEU for the Lynx HAS.3, disbanding in July 1992.

700 Naval Air Squadron - Intensive Flying Trials Units
Unit	Date formed	Naval Air Station	Date disbanded	Aircraft	Commanding officer	Notes
700H Whirlwind HAS.7 IFTU	18 March 1957	RNAS Lee-on-Solent	26 September 1957	Westland Whirlwind HAS.7	Lieutenant Commander J.G.C. Williams, RN	
700X Scimitar F.1 IFTU	27 August 1957	RNAS Ford	29 May 1958	Supermarine Scimitar F.1	Commander T.G. Innes,, RN (KIA 21 March 1958); Lieutenant Commander W.A. Tofts, AFC, RN; Lieutenant Commander J.D. Russell (from 17 April 1958)	
700Y Sea Vixen FAW.1 IFTU	4 November 1958	RNAS Yeovilton	1 July 1959	de Havilland Sea Vixen FAW.1; Hawker Hunter T.8	Commander M.H.J. Perrie, RN	became 892 Naval Air Squadron
700H Whirlwind HAS.7 IFTU	1 June 1959	RNAS Culdrose	27 August 1959	Westland Whirlwind HAS.7	Lieutenant Commander A.G. Cornabe, RN	
700G Gannet AEW.3 IFTU	17 August 1959	RNAS Culdrose	1 February 1960	Fairey Gannet AEW.3	Lieutenant Commander W. Hawley, RN	became 'A' Flight 849 Naval Air Squadron
700H Wessex HAS.1 IFTU	1 April 1960	RNAS Culdrose	12 January 1962	Westland Wessex HAS.1	Lieutenant Commander R. Turpin, RN	
700Z Buccaneer S.1 IFTU	7 March 1961	RNAS Lossiemouth	15 January 1963	Blackburn Buccaneer S.1; Hawker Hunter T.8; Gloster Meteor T.7	Lieutenant Commander A.J. Leahy, MBE, DSC, RN	
700W Wasp HAS.1 IFTU	4 June 1963	RNAS Culdrose	4 March 1964	Westland Wasp HAS.1	Lieutenant Commander K. Mitchell, DFC, RN	
700V Wessex HU.5 IFTU	29 October 1963	RNAS Culdrose	7 May 1964	Westland Wessex HU.5	Lieutenant Commander C.J Isacke, RN	became 848 Naval Air Squadron
700B Buccaneer S.2 IFTU	9 April 1965	RNAS Lossiemouth	30 September 1965	Blackburn Buccaneer S.2; Hawker Hunter T.8	Commander N.J.P. Mills, RN	
700H Wessex HAS.3 IFTU	9 January 1967	RNAS Culdrose	15 September 1967	Westland Wessex HAS.3	Lieutenant Commander C.R.V. Doe, RN	
700P Phanton FG.1 IFTU	30 April 1968	RNAS Yeovilton	31 March 1969	McDonnell Douglas F-4K Phantom II FG.1	Commander A.M.G. Pearson, RN	
700S Sea King HAS.1 IFTU	1 July 1969	RNAS Culdrose	29 May 1970	Westland Sea King HAS.1	Lieutenant Commander V.G. Sirett, RN	
700L Lynx HAS.2 IFTU	1 September 1976	RNAS Yeovilton	16 December 1977	Westland Lynx HAS.2; SH-14A Lynx Mk.25	Lieutenant Commander G.A Cavalier, RN	
700A Sea Harrier FRS.1 IFTU	26 June 1979	RNAS Yeovilton	31 March 1980	British Aerospace Sea Harrier FRS.1	Lieutenant Commander N.D. "Sharkey" MacCartan-Ward, DSC, AFC, RN	became 899 Naval Air Squadron
700L Lynx HAS.3(CTS) OEU	6 July 1990	RNAS Portland	17 July 1992	Westland Lynx HAS.3	Lieutenant Commander C.E Thornton, RN; Lieutenant Commander M. Boland, RN (14 July 1992)	(Lynx CTS Trials)
700M Merlin HM.1 ITFU/OEU	1 December 1998	RNAS Culdrose	13 March 2008	AgustaWestland Merlin HM1		disbanded into 824 Naval Air Squadron
700W Wildcat HMA2 Trials Unit	14 May 2009	RNAS Yeovilton/MOD Boscombe Down	30 July 2014	AgustaWestland Wildcat HMA2		Merged with 702 Naval Air Squadron to form 825 Naval Air Squadron
700X Scan Eagle OT&E Unit	1 October 2014	RNAS Culdrose	-	Boeing Insitu Scan Eagle UAV; AeroVironment RQ-20 Puma; QinetiQ Banshee Jet 80+		

=== 700M Merlin HM1 IFTU/OEU (1998-2008) ===
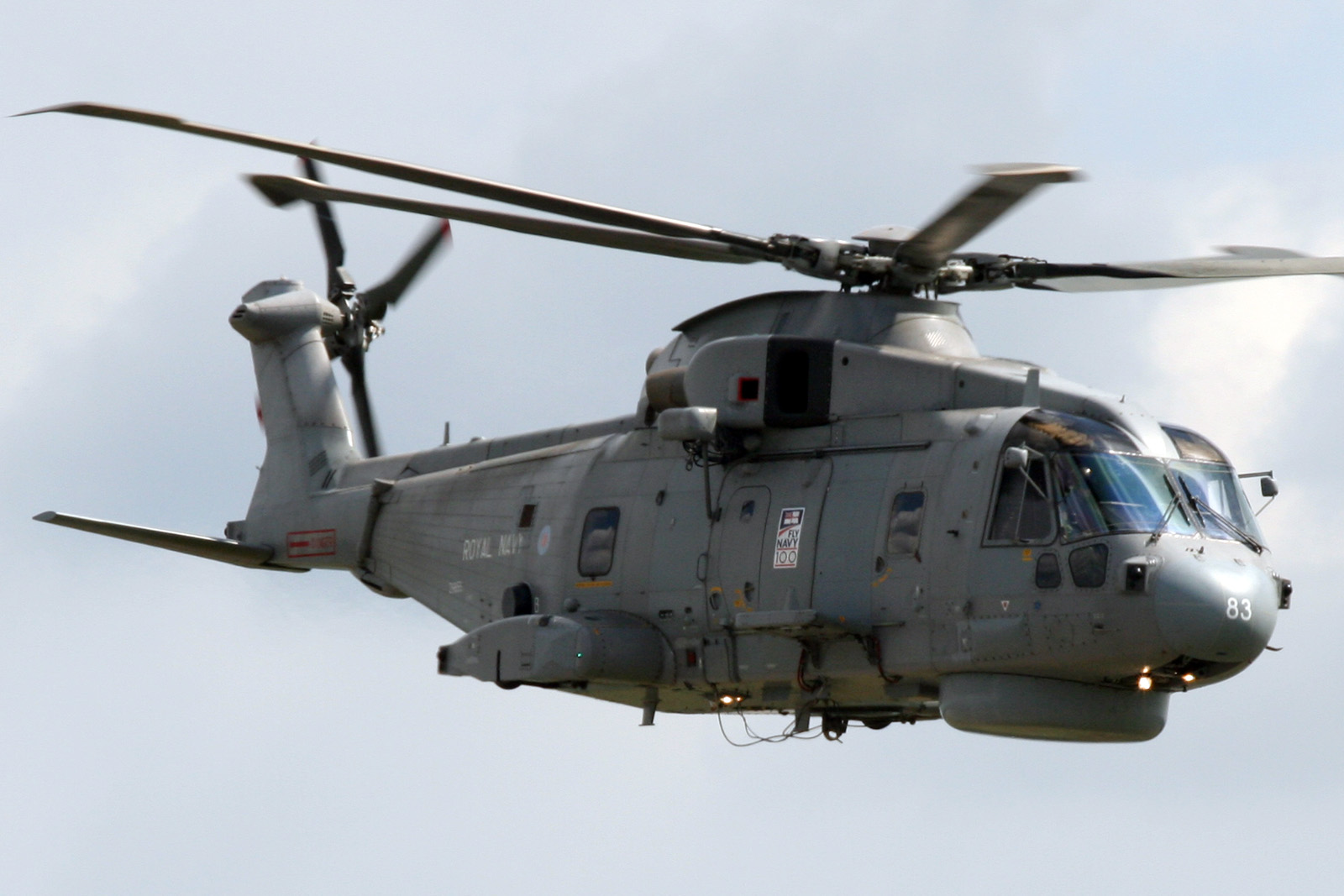
Merlin HM1

More recently, the squadron was re-commissioned at RNAS Culdrose (HMS Seahawk) in Cornwall during December 1998 as 700M Naval Air Squadron, with a primary role as an Intensive Flying Trials Unit (IFTU) of testing and evaluating the AgustaWestland Merlin HM1 helicopter. It functioned as the IFTU for nearly three years and oversaw the Training Flight from March 1999 until the establishment of 824 Naval Air Squadron.

In September 2001 the unit became the Operational Evaluation Unit (OEU) for the Fleet Air Arm's Merlin helicopter. In 2002 the OEU deployed to both the United States Navy's Atlantic Undersea Test and Evaluation Center (AUTEC) and NATO's Fleet Operational Readiness Accuracy Check Site (FORACS) and the following year the aircrew only deployed on Operation Telic to enlarge 814 Naval Air Squadron.

From 2003 to 2006, ongoing trials contributed to the progressive development of the aircraft mission system, armaments and sensors. In 2007 the OEU deployed to the Caribbean aboard HMS Ocean to take part in Counter Narcotics operations with the US Coastguard and was involved with a seizure of nearly half a ton of cocaine worth around £29 million. 700M Naval Air Squadron disbanded on 31 March 2008, transferring its aircraft and personnel to 824 Naval Air Squadron and also forming a new flight, 824 OEU.

=== 700W Wildcat HMA2 Trials Unit (2009-2014) ===
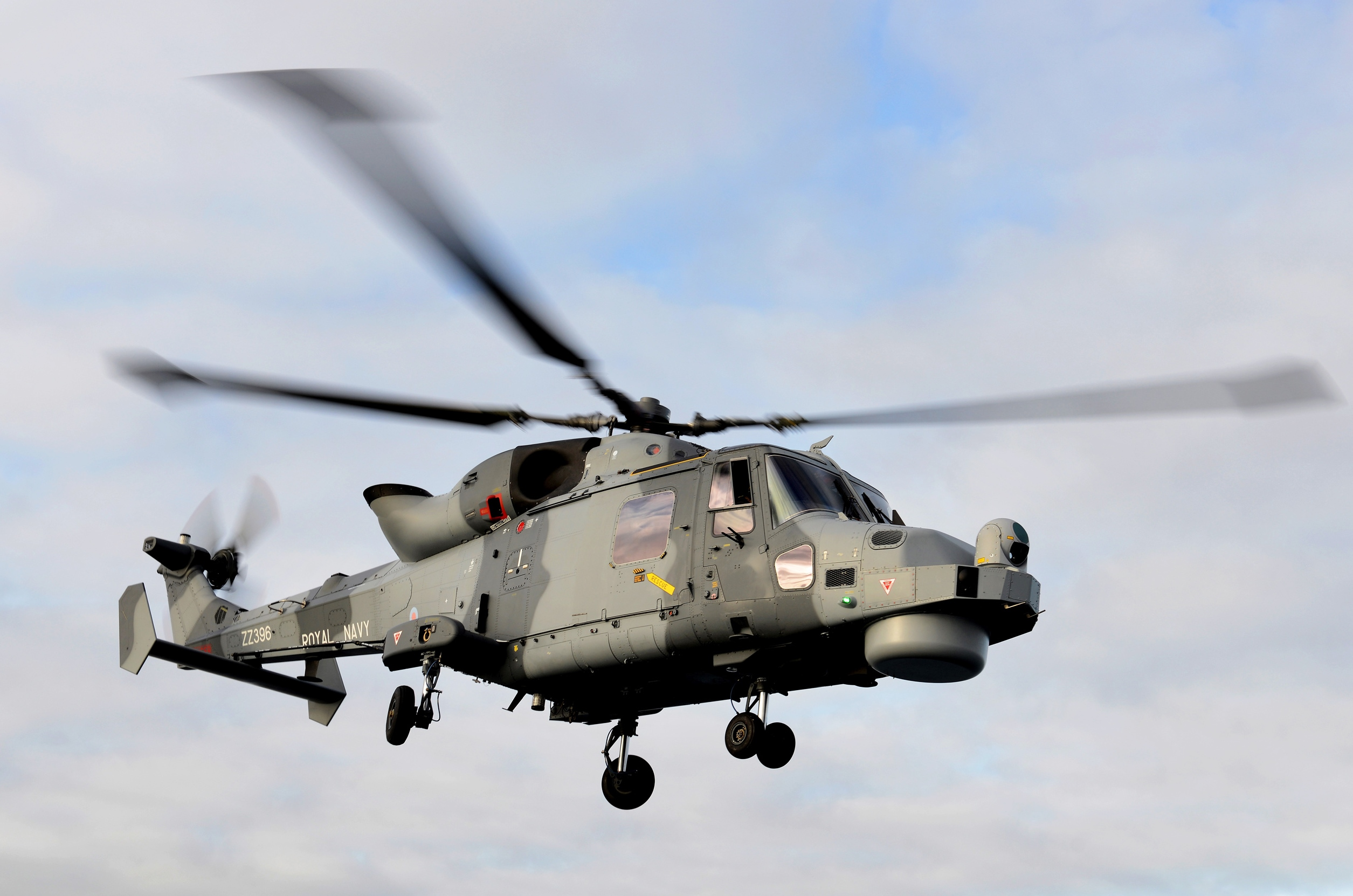
A Wildcat HMA2 of 700(W) Naval Air Squadron conducting flying trials near HMS Monmouth off the South coast of the UK

The 700W Naval Air Squadron was re-established from the Lynx Operational Evaluation Unit at RNAS Yeovilton as the Lynx Wildcat Fielding Squadron in May 2009. Its mission involved collaboration with AgustaWestland and the QinetiQ Rotary Wing Test and Evaluation Squadron at MOD Boscombe Down, Wiltshire, to evaluate the Wildcat HMA2, although no formal aircraft was assigned to the squadron. From January 2013, 700W received five Wildcat helicopters for operational evaluation and conversion training.

The squadron was disbanded in July 2014 when it was merged with 702 Naval Air Squadron to form 825 Naval Air Squadron, the first operational Fleet Air Arm AgustaWestland Wildcat unit.

=== Maritime Unmanned Air System (2014-present) ===
In October 2014 the squadron reformed as 700X Naval Air Squadron at RNAS Culdrose (HMS Seahawk), Cornwall. It was initially tasked with Operational Test and Evaluation (OT&E) for the Boeing Insitu ScanEagle an unmanned surveillance and reconnaissance aerial vehicle. The squadron was setup to undertake Remotely Piloted Air Systems (RPAS) trials, and it previously acted as a parent unit for the various ship-based flights operating the ScanEagle. It was first deployed from the Type 23 frigates HMS Somerset and HMS Northumberland and RFA Cardigan Bay and it was subsequently operated from the Type 23 frigate HMS Kent, which had been deployed to the Arabian Sea to commence counter-piracy operations. However, the Royal Navy ceased operating ScanEagle by November 2017.

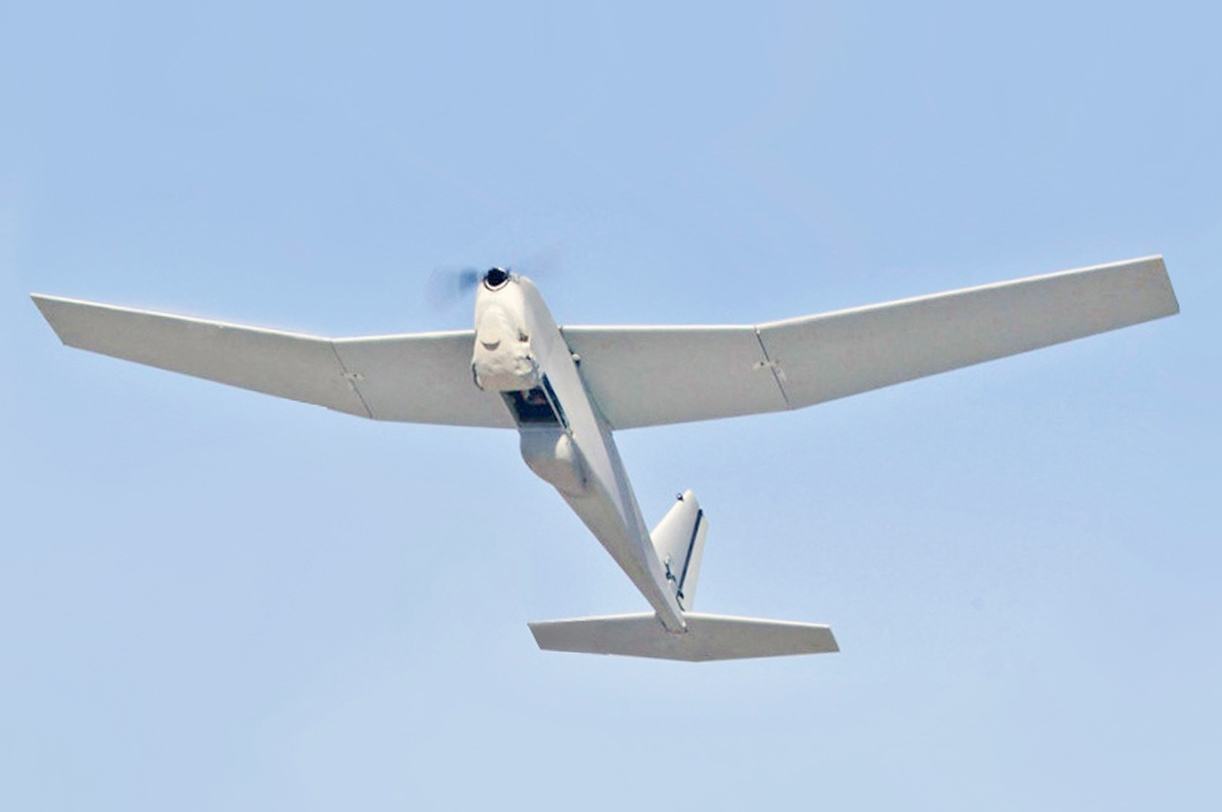
RQ-20 Puma unmanned aerial vehicle

In November 2019, 700X Naval Air Squadron tested two new Unmanned Aircraft Systems (UAS), namely, the AeroVironment RQ-20 Puma, a small, battery powered, hand-launched intelligence and surveillance UAV, and the AeroVironment Wasp III miniature UAV. By 2020 the squadron had three flights operating with the RQ-20 Puma system for deployment. These were designated Phantom Flights A, B and C, with each flight made up of a commander, an air engineering technician and a naval airman.

The initial operational test was during the name ship of her class HMS Albion's Mediterranean deployment. To operate the Puma system, the three personnel who made up the flight were the Flight Commander who integrated the Puma with the ship, the mission operator who flew the Puma and the vehicle operator who controlled the camera. As of 2021, twelve Puma systems were deployed with the squadron permitting individual teams to be embarked on Royal Navy vessels as might be required. In 2024, the Navy reported that there were a total of nine qualified Puma teams, six of which were dedicated to supporting the Royal Marines in 40 and 45 Commando.

By the end of 2022 a team from 700X Naval Air Squadron had constructed their own remotely-piloted air system (RPAS). The octo-quadcopter weighed 20 kilograms (44 lb) and was named Walrus after the amphibious maritime patrol aircraft used by the squadron during the Second World War. The quadcopter was planned to be used by the Royal Navy as an independent test and evaluation platform. Initial ground tests and assessments of it took place inside the controlled environment of a hangar, and when completed Walrus was passed operational and ready to be used for different sensor and payload tests.

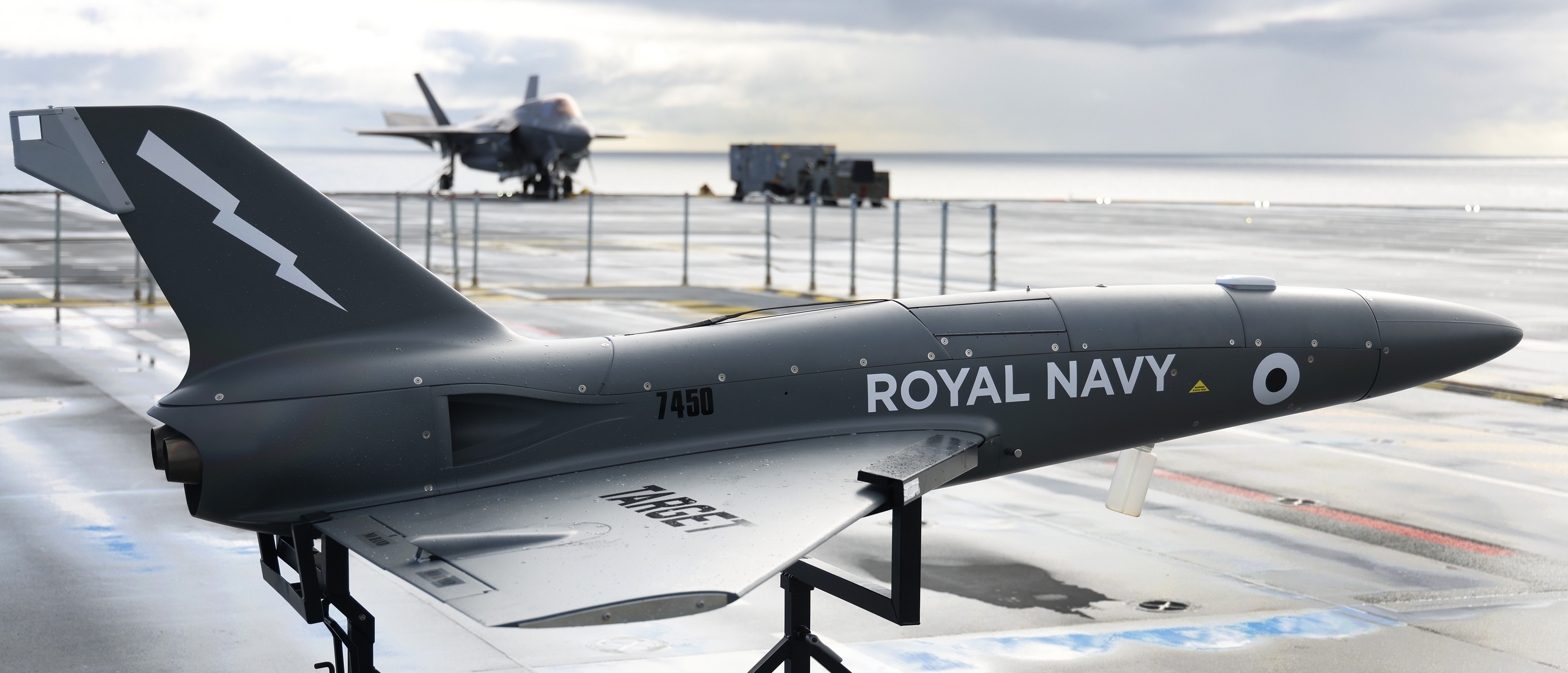
A QinetiQ Banshee Jet 80+ drone on the flight deck of HMS Prince of Wales

In 2023 a new flight was formed by 700X Naval Air Squadron to learn how to maintain and safely operate the QinetiQ Banshee Jet 80+. The Banshee Jet 80+ drones can achieve above 400 miles per hour (640 km/h) and are of capable more than 60 miles (97 km) range. The 3m x 2.5m drone is launched from a pneumatic platform. It can be operated from the ground where onboard cameras and sensors are examined. The Royal Navy took delivery of the Banshee 80+ with the intention of using it to test all different types of sensors and the test flights were scheduled to take place during the summer at Predannack Airfield, Mullion, which the squadron uses as a centre of expertise for flights and training. However, on 9 April 2025, the Royal Navy declared the conclusion of the two-year trial for 700X NAS use of the drone, resulting in the Banshee's retirement from active service.

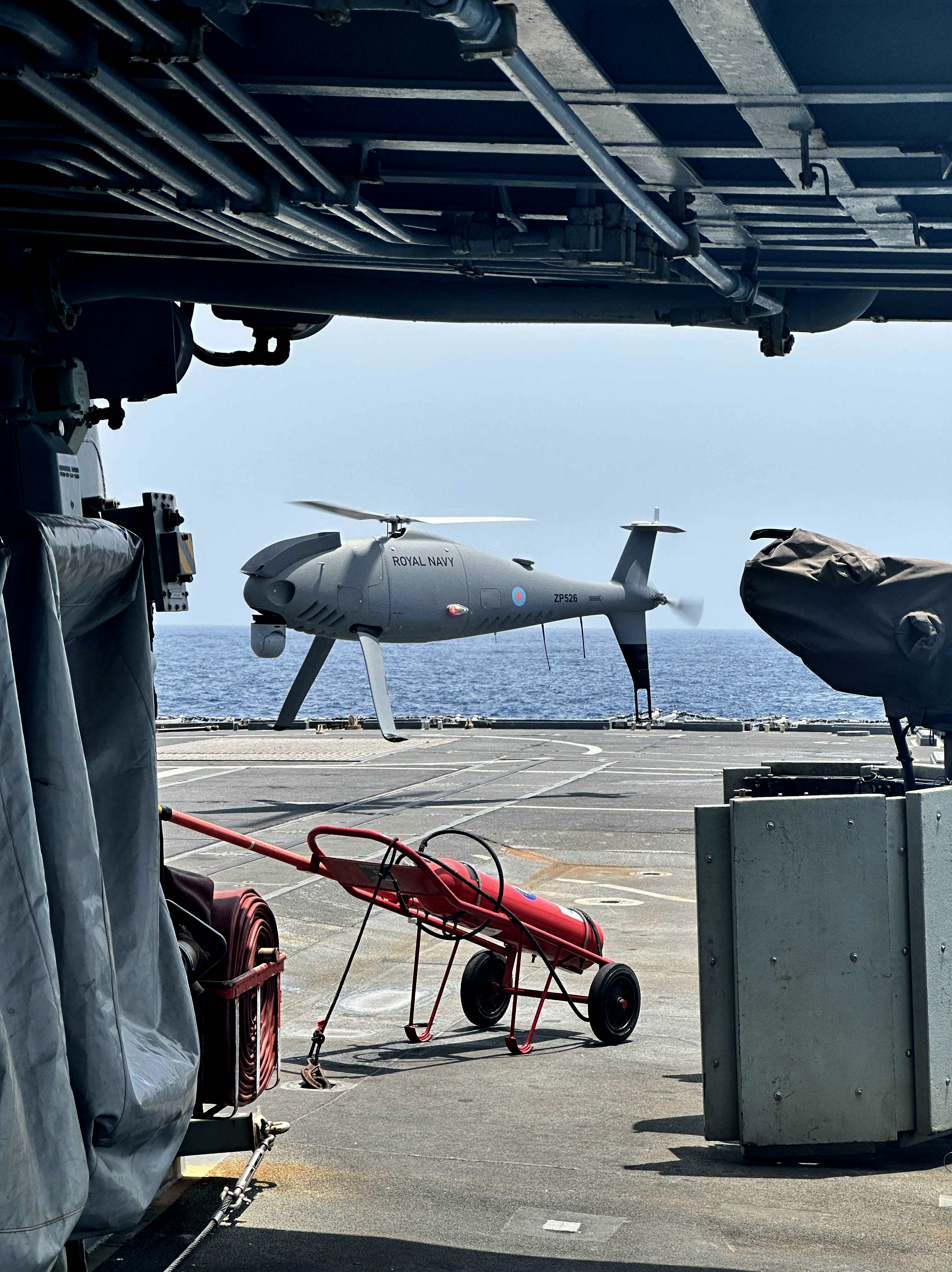
Peregrine rotary-wing UAV trials aboard HMS Lancaster

In the beginning of 2023, the Royal Navy chose the Schiebel Camcopter S-100 for use in intelligence-gathering, surveillance, and reconnaissance operations. It is designated as "Peregrine" within the Royal Navy, named after HMS Peregrine, which was the former Royal Naval Air Station RNAS Ford. In August 2024, the squadron began trials on the Type 23 frigate HMS Lancaster with the Peregrine rotary-wing unmanned aerial vehicle (UAV). The rotary-wing UAV was designed to operate alongside its regular helicopter detachment and provide enhanced surveillance capabilities to the frigate.

Logistics unmanned aerial vehicles (UAVs) facilitated the transfer of supplies between vessels for the Carrier Strike Group 25 (Operation Highmast) deployment. HMS Prince of Wales carried a small fleet of Malloy Aeronautics T150 UAVs. These were responsible for transporting lightweight cargo, including engineering parts and personal parcels, between ships, thereby allowing helicopters to focus on more critical missions such as anti-submarine warfare and surface surveillance. A total of nine T-150 drones were managed by 700X Naval Air Squadron. A team of twelve personnel conducted trials of the system at sea.

In autumn 2025 the squadron undertook joint trials with the United States Eighth Army in South Korea to assess heavy‑lift drone support for frontline logistics and casualty evacuation. Operating a Malloy T‑150 at the Rodriguez Live Fire Complex, the squadron demonstrated autonomous delivery of ammunition, water, medical supplies and the potential movement of wounded personnel in contested environments. The work built on its earlier milestone during Carrier Strike Group 25 preparations, when a T‑150 completed the first autonomous ship‑to‑ship via drone resupply between HMS Prince of Wales and HMS Dauntless.

In January 2026, personnel from 700X NAS deployed to Hyères Naval Air Base, France, with the Peregrine UAV to conduct joint training with the French Naval Aviation. The deployment enabled the squadron to exchange operational experience with French operators of the Schiebel S-100 Camcopter, while also renewing operator qualifications. The exercise formed part of the Royal Navy’s continued development of uncrewed maritime aviation and strengthened cooperation between the two navies in the operation of rotary-wing uncrewed aircraft systems.

Also in January 2026, personnel from 700X NAS participated in the ‘Eagles Eye’ trials at Predannack Airfield, Cornwall, alongside Wildcat HMA2 helicopters from 815 Naval Air Squadron and industry partners. During the trials, the squadron’s RQ-20 Puma UAVs were integrated into a multi-node mesh network, enabling a Wildcat HMA2 helicopter crew to receive live surveillance data from multiple unmanned systems while airborne. The demonstrations formed part of the Royal Navy’s development of a “hybrid air wing” concept, exploring the integration of crewed and uncrewed aircraft through networked command and control. The RQ-20 Puma, which had been operated by 700X NAS for more than six years, was remotely tasked from the Wildcat HMA2 helicopter to provide targeting information alongside a Providence unmanned aerial system (UAS) and ground-based sensors.

In February 2026, a flight commander from 700X Naval Air Squadron, Lieutenant Commander Adrian “AJ” Hill, became the first Royal Navy drone operator to receive a Fleet Air Arm Green Endorsement, the service’s highest aviation safety commendation. During trials of the Peregrine rotary‑wing unmanned aerial vehicle aboard HMS Lancaster in the Gulf of Oman, the aircraft suffered a sudden computer failure while hovering autonomously at around 60 feet (18 m) and descended to within one or two feet of the sea. Hill took manual control and recovered the £2.5 million unmanned aerial vehicle, an action cited as demonstrating exceptional professional skill and preventing a significant loss of equipment and operational capability.

During Exercise Tamber Shield in 2026, elements of 700X Naval Air Squadron were integrated into Royal Navy trials of crewed–uncrewed co‑operation in the confined waters of western Norway. Operating RQ-20 Puma uncrewed aircraft from the Royal Norwegian Navy's Haakonsvern Naval Base and the Royal Navy's type 45 destroyer HMS Duncan, the squadron provided reconnaissance and targeting information to 815 Naval Air Squadron Wildcats conducting Martlet missile serials against simulated fast attack craft and aerial threats. The deployment formed part of the Fleet Air Arm’s continuing evaluation of uncrewed systems in support of surface and aviation units, with 700X NAS contributing sensor coverage, route surveillance and threat cueing during helicopter manoeuvres in fjord environments.

In August 2026, Scout Flight of 700X Naval Air Squadron conducted heavy‑lift drone trials in the Caribbean while embarked in the Batch 2 River-class patrol vesselHMS Trent. Using the Malloy T‑150B unmanned aerial vehicle, the squadron carried out multiple launch and recovery sorties to develop shipboard procedures and familiarise the ship’s company with the system. The trials represented the first heavy‑lift drone flight from a Royal Navy patrol boat and formed part of wider experimentation into ship‑to‑shore logistics for humanitarian assistance and disaster relief operations.

== Aircraft flown ==
The squadron operated a variety of different aircraft and versions:

- Fairey Swordfish I/FP torpedo bomber/floatplane (January 1940 – January 1942)
- Fairey Seafox reconnaissance seaplane (January 1940 – September 1942)
- Supermarine Walrus amphibious maritime patrol aircraft (January 1940 – March 1944)
- Fairey Fulmar Mk.I reconnaissance/fighter aircraft (September 1941)
- Fairey Swordfish torpedo bomber (July 1943 – December 1943)
- Douglas Dauntless scout plane and dive bomber (December 1944 – February 1946)
- Miles Master II advanced trainer aircraft (October 1944 – July 1946)
- Grumman Wildcat Mk VI fighter aircraft (December 1944)
- Grumman Avenger Mk.I torpedo bomber (June 1945 – February 1946)
- Grumman Avenger Mk.II torpedo bomber (March 1945 – May 1945)
- Fairey Barracuda Mk II torpedo and dive bomber (January 1945 – March 1946)
- Fairey Firefly I fighter aircraft (January 1945 – September 1949)
- Stinson Reliant I liaison and training monoplane (January 1945 – February 1946)
- Supermarine Seafire F Mk.III fighter aircraft (January 1945 – February 1946)
- Supermarine Seafire Mk.Ib fighter aircraft (February 1945 – September 1945)
- Supermarine Seafire F Mk.XV fighter aircraft (February 1945 – March 1948)
- Vought Corsair Mk III fighter-bomber (February 1945 – February 1946)
- Grumman Wildcat Mk V fighter aircraft (February - March 1945)
- Curtiss Helldiver I dive bomber (November 1945 – December 1945)
- Curtiss Seamew I observation floatplane (November 1945 – December 1945)
- Hawker Hurricane Mk.IIc fighter aircraft (January 1945 – May 1945)
- Fairey Swordfish III torpedo bomber (January 1945 – May 1945)
- Vought Corsair Mk I fighter-bomber (March 1945 – November 1945)
- Grumman Hellcat F. Mk. II fighter aircraft (June 1945 – January 1946)
- Grumman Martlet Mk V fighter aircraft (June 1945 – February 1946)
- Blackburn Firebrand T.F. III strike fighter (June 1945 – March 1946)
- Fairey Albacore torpedo bomber (January 1946 – February 1946)
- Fairey Fulmar Mk.II reconnaissance/fighter aircraft (January 1946 – February 1946)
- Supermarine Walrus amphibious maritime patrol aircraft (January 1945 – February 1946)
- Airspeed Oxford training aircraft (February 1946 – August 1947)
- North American Harvard III advanced trainer aircraft (April 1947 – September 1949)
- Fairey Barracuda TR 5 torpdeo and dive bomber (February 1948 – June 1948)
- Blackburn Firebrand T.F. 5 strike fighter (February 1948)
- Hawker Sea Fury F.10 fighter aircraft (June 1948 – September 1949)
- Avro Anson Mk I multirole training aircraft (August 1955 – May 1956)
- Supermarine Attacker FB.2 jet fighter-bomber (August 1955 – February 1956)
- Westland Wyvern S.4 strike aircraft (August 1955 - February 1957)
- Fairey Gannet AS.1 anti-submarine warfare aircraft (August 1955 – June 1961)
- Hawker Sea Hawk F1 jet fighter (August 1955 – November 1955)
- Hawker Sea Hawk FB3 jet fighter-bomber (August 1955 – September 1958)
- Hawker Sea Hawk FGA 4 jet fighter/ground attack aircraft (August 1955 – September 1959)
- Hawker Sea Fury FB.11 jet fighter-bomber (December 1955 – January 1956)
- Grumman Avenger AS.5 anti-submarine warfare aircraft (June 1956 – August 1958)
- Hawker Sea Hawk F2 jet fighter (November 1956 – February 1957)
- Short Seamew anti-submarine warfare aircraft (November 1956 – February 1957)
- de Havilland Sea Vampire F.20 jet fighter-bomber (August 1955 – November 1956)
- de Havilland Sea Venom FAW.21 jet fighter-bomber (January 1956 – March 1961)
- de Havilland Sea Venom FAW.20 jet fighter-bomber (September 1956 – August 1959)
- Fairey Firefly TT.Mk 4 target tug aircraft (August 1955 – February 1957)
- Hawker Sea Hawk FGA 6 jet fighter/ground attack aircraft (July 1957 – August 1959)
- de Havilland Sea Vampire T.22 jet trainer (July 1957 – October 1957)
- Supermarine Scimitar F.1 jet strike fighter (March 1958 – February 1959)
- Hawker Sea Hawk FB5 jet fighter-bomber (November 1958 – August 1959)
- Westland Whirlwind HAR.3 utility and air-sea search and rescue helicopter (September 1958 – June 1961)
- Westland Whirlwind HAS.7 anti-submarine warfare helicopter (September 1958 - February 1960)
- Westland Dragonfly HR.1 air-sea search and rescue helicopter (February 1959 – October 1959)
- Saro P.531‑O/N utility helicopter (October 1959 – June 1961)
- Gloster Meteor TT.20 jet high-speed target tug (December 1959 – July 1961)
- Westland Whirlwind HAR.1 utility and air-sea search and rescue helicopter (May 1960 – November 1960)

=== IFTU ===
700A Squadron

- British Aerospace Sea Harrier FRS.1 vertical and/or short take-off and landing (V/STOL) jet fighter, reconnaissance and attack aircraft (June 1979 - March 1980)

700B Squadron

- Blackburn Buccaneer S.2 maritime jet strike aircraft (April - September 1965)
- Hawker Hunter T.8 jet trainer (April - May 1965)

700G Squadron

- Fairey Gannet AEW.3 airborne early warning aircraft (August 1959 - January 1960)

700H Squadron

- Westland Whirlwind HAS.7 anti-submarine warfare helicopter (March - September 1957)
- Westland Whirlwind HAS.7 anti-submarine warfare helicopter (June - August 1959)
- Westland Wessex HAS.1 anti-submarine warfare helicopter (April 1960 - January 1962)
- Westland Wessex HAS.3 anti-submarine warfare helicopter (January - September 1976)

700L Squadron

- Westland Lynx HAS.2 anti-submarine warfare helicopter (September 1976 - December 1977)
- SH-14 Lynx Mk 25 anti-submarine warfare helicopter (November 1976 - May 1977)
- Westland Lynx HAS.3 anti-submarine warfare helicopter (July 1990 - July 1992)

700M Squadron

- AgustaWestland Merlin HM1 anti-submarine warfare helicopter (December 1998 - February 2008)

700P Squadron

- McDonnell Douglas F-4K Phantom FG.1 all-weather, long-range supersonic jet interceptor and fighter-bomber (April 1968 - March 1969)

700S Squadron

- Westland Sea King HAS.1 anti-submarine warfare helicopter (August 1969 - May 1970)

700V Squadron

- Westland Wessex HU.5 troop transporter (October 1963 - May 1964)

700W Squadron

- Westland Wasp HAS.1 anti-submarine warfare helicopter (June 1963 - March 1964)
- AgustaWestland Wildcat HMA2 Utility, SAR and ASuW helicopter (January 2013 - July 2014)

700X Squadron

- Supermarine Scimitar F.1 jet strike fighter (August 1957 - May 1958)
- de Havilland Sea Vampire T.22 jet trainer (August 1957 - May 1958)
- Boeing Insitu Scaneagle small unmanned surveillance and reconnaissance aerial vehicle (October 2014 - 2017)

700Y Squadron

- De Havilland Sea Vixen FAW.1 jet fighter (November 1958 - July 1959)
- Hawker Hunter T.8 jet trainer (November 1958 - January 1959)

700Z Squadron

- Blackburn Buccaneer S.1 maritime jet strike aircraft (August 1961 - December 1962)
- Hawker Hunter T.8 jet trainer (May 1961 0 December 1962)
- Gloster Meteor T.7 jet trainer (May - December 1961)

== Battle honours ==
700 Naval Air Squadron has been awarded eight battle honours, during the Second World War:

- River Plate 1939
- Norway 1940
- Spartivento 1940
- Atlantic 1940–41
- Matapan 1941
- Mediterranean 1942
- North Africa 1942-43
- Normandy 1944

== Assignments ==
700 Naval Air Squadron was assigned as needed to form part of larger unit:

- 50th Training Air Group (May 1948 - August 1949)

== Naval air stations and other airbases ==
700 Naval Air Squadron operated from a number of naval air stations of the Royal Navy, Royal Air Force stations and other airbases in the United Kingdom and overseas:

1940 - 1944

- Royal Naval Air Station Hatston (HMS Sparrowhawk), Mainland, Orkney, (21 January 1940 - 22 June 1942)
- Royal Naval Air Station Twatt (HMS Tern), Mainland, Orkney, (22 June 1942 - 24 March 1944)
  - Courses:
    - Royal Naval Air Station Donibristle (HMS Merlin), Fife, (1940 – 1943)
    - Royal Naval Air Station Dundee (HMS Condor II), Angus, (1940 – 1943)
    - HMS Pegasus (1941 – 1944)
  - disembarked Flights UK:
    - Royal Naval Air Station Arbroath (HMS Condor), Angus, (1940 – 1943)
    - Royal Naval Air Station Dundee (HMS Condor II), Angus, (1940 – 1943)
    - Royal Air Force Grimsetter, Mainland, Orkney, (1940 – 1943)
    - Royal Naval Air Station Hatston (HMS Sparrowhawk), Mainland, Orkney, (1940 – 1943)
    - Royal Naval Air Station Lee-on-Solent (HMS Daedalus), Hampshire, (1940 – 1944)
    - Royal Air Force Mount Batten, Devon, (1940 – 1943)
    - Royal Air Force Roborough, Devon, (1940 – 1943)
    - RN Air Section Speke, Merseyside, (1940 – 1943)
    - Royal Naval Air Station Twatt (HMS Tern), Mainland, Orkney, (1941 – 1944)
  - disembarked Flights Overseas:
    - Royal Naval Air Station Bermuda, Boaz Island, Bermuda, (1940 – 1943)
    - Royal Naval Air Station Dekheila (HMS Grebe), Alexandria, Egypt, (1940 – 1943)
    - Royal New Zealand Air Force Station Hobsonville, Aukland, New Zealand, (1940 – 1943)
    - Royal Air Force Kalafrana, Malta, (1940)
    - RN Air Section Gibraltar, Gibraltar, (1940 – 1943)
    - Royal Air Force Seletar, Singapore, (1940 – 1941)
    - RN Air Section Tafaraoui, Oran, Algeria, (1943)
- disbanded - (24 March 1944)

1944 - 1949

- Royal Naval Air Station Donibristle (HMS Merlin), Fife, (11 October - 7 November 1944)
- Royal Naval Air Station Worthy Down (HMS Kestrel), Hampshire, (7 November 1944 - 23 November 1945)
- Royal Naval Air Station Middle Wallop (HMS Flycatcher), Hampshire, (23 November 1945 - 1 April 1946)
- Royal Naval Air Station Yeovilton (HMS Heron), Somerset, (1 April 1946 - 30 September 1949)
- disbanded - (30 September 1949)

1955 - 1961

- Royal Naval Air Station Ford (HMS Peregrine), West Sussex, (18August 1955 - 19 September 1958)
  - RN Air Section North Front, Gibraltar, (Detachments 1956 – 1958)
  - Royal Naval Air Station Lossiemouth (HMS Fulmar), Moray, (Detachments 1957 – 1960)
  - Royal Naval Air Station Brawdy (HMS Goldcrest), Pembrokeshire, (Detachments 1957 – 1960)
  - Royal Naval Air Station Portland (HMS Osprey), Dorset, (Detachments 1959 – 1961)
- Royal Naval Air Station Yeovilton (HMS Heron), Somerset, (19 September 1958 - 5 January 1960)
- Royal Naval Air Station Merryfield (HMS Vulture), Cornwall, (5 January 1960 - 10 October 1960)
- Royal Naval Air Station Yeovilton (HMS Heron), Somerset, (10 October 1960 - 3 July 1961)
- disbanded - (3 July 1961)

=== 700 Squadron Shetland Flight ===
- Royal Air Force Sullom Voe, Shetland, (16 July 1940 - 28 May 1941)
- disbanded - (28 May 1941)

=== 700 Squadron Stornoway Flight ===
- Royal Air Force Stornoway, Isle of Lewis, (11 November 1940 - March 1941)
- to Shetland Flight at Royal Air Force Sullom Voe, Shetland, (March 1941)

=== 700 (Mediterranean) Squadron ===
- Royal Naval Air Station Dekheila (HMS Grebe), Alexandria, Egypt, (16 October 1941)
- RN Air Section Aboukir (HMS Nile II), Alexandria, Egypt, (January 1942 - 18 April 1942)
- Royal Air Force St Jean D'Acre, Acre, Israel, (18 April 1942 - 11 May 1942)

became: 700 (Levant) Squadron

- Royal Air force Beirut, Beirut, Lebanon, (11 May 1942 - 1 October 1942)
  - Latakia (Detachment June - September 1942)
- became 701 Naval Air Squadron (1 October 1942)

=== 700 (Gibraltar) Squadron ===
- HMS Argus (20 November 1942 - 27 November 1942)
- RN Air Section North Front, Gibraltar, (27 November 1942 - 27 April 1943)
- disbanded - (27 April 1943)

=== 700 (Algiers) Squadron ===
- RN Air Section North Front, Gibraltar, (December 1942 - 8 January 1943)
- Arzew, Oran, Algeria, (8 January 1943 - 5 April 1943)
- disbanded - (5 April 1943)

=== 700W Flight ===
- Royal Naval Air Station Sandbanks, Dorset, (12 - 26 July 1943)
  - Royal Naval Air Station Lee-on-Solent (HMS Daedalus), Hampshire, (Detachment 23–27 July 1943)
- Royal Naval Air Station Machrihanish (HMS Landrail), Argyll and Bute, (26 July - 14 August 1943)
- Royal Naval Air Station Eglinton (HMS Gannet), County Londonderry, (14 August - 15 September 1943)
- Royal Naval Air Station Machrihanish (HMS Landrail), Argyll and Bute, (15 - 25 September 1943)
- HMS Fencer (25 September - 9 October 1943)
- Royal Air Force Lagens, Azores, (9 - 24 October 1943)
- HMS Fencer (24 October - 19 November 1943)
- Royal Naval Air Station Machrihanish (HMS Landrail), Argyll and Bute, (19 November - 16 December 1943)
- disbanded into 836 Naval Air Squadron - (16 December 1943)
