= RNAS Hatston =

Former Royal Naval Air Station in Orkney, Scotland

RNAS Hatston HMS Sparrowhawk HMS Tern II
- Kirkwall, on the Mainland of Orkney in Scotland
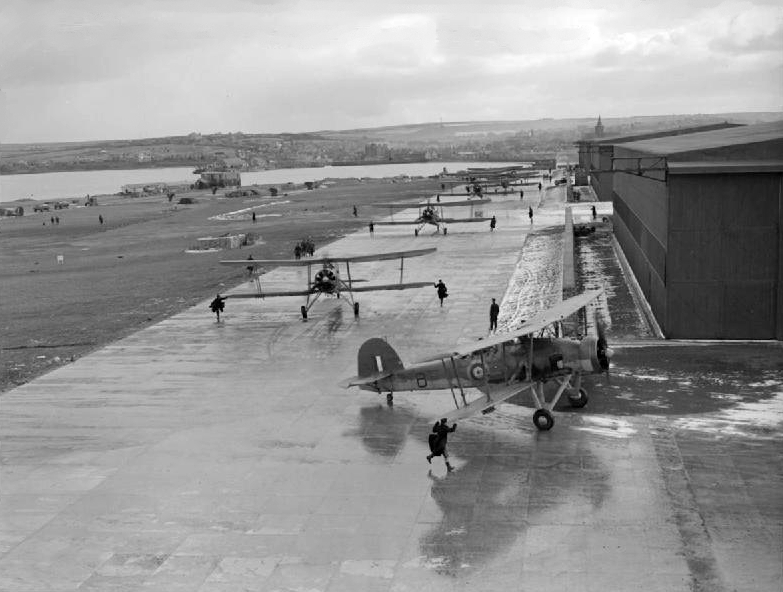
- Fairey Swordfish taxi along the tarmac to take off for an exercise with dummy torpedoes from HMS Sparrowhawk, Royal Naval Air Station, Hatston

- HMS Sparrowhawk

Site information
- Type: Royal Naval Air Station
- Code: H
- Owner: Admiralty
- Operator: Royal Navy
- Controlled by: Fleet Air Arm
- Condition: Disused

Location
- Shown within the Orkney Islands RNAS Hatston (the United Kingdom)
- Coordinates: 58°59′39″N 002°58′35″W
- Grid reference: HY435125

Site history
- Built: 1934
- In use: October 1939 - 1948
- Fate: Ferry terminal vehicle parking area / Industry / Open land
- Battles/wars: European theatre of World War II

Garrison information
- Garrison: Fleet Air Arm
- Occupants: 700 Naval Air Squadron HQ (Accommodation for disembarked Ship's Flight Aircraft); 771 Naval Air Squadron (Home Fleet Fleet Requirements Unit)

Airfield information
- Elevation: 7 metres (23 ft) AMSL
Runways
Direction	Length and surface
15/33	914 metres (2,999 ft) Asphalt concrete
07/25	741 metres (2,431 ft) Asphalt concrete
12/30	722 metres (2,369 ft) Asphalt concrete
01/19	713 metres (2,339 ft) Asphalt concrete

Royal Naval Air Station Hatston, or more commonly known as RNAS Hatston; (commissioned HMS Sparrowhawk), was a military airfield located one mile to the north west of Kirkwall, on the island of Mainland, Orkney, Scotland, built as a Royal Naval Air Station. It was located near the strategically vital naval base of Scapa Flow, which for most of the twentieth century formed the main base of the ships of the Home Fleet. The naval air station was designed to provide accommodation for disembarked Front-Line squadrons and accommodation for disembarked Ship's Flight Aircraft and was home to the Home Fleet's Fleet Requirements Unit, 771 Naval Air Squadron.

The airbase was situated near two notable landmarks, it was located next to the town and port of Kirkwall, with Scapa Flow 2.5 miles (4 km) south. The airfield was sited on the south bank of the Bay of Kirkwall, 1 mile (2 km) north east of the town of Kirkwall, and the road from Kirkwall to Finstown forms the southern boundary of the airfield.

It was purpose built by the Admiralty and commissioned on 2 October 1939 as HMS Sparrowhawk, the airbase remained operational for almost six years, before It was ‘paid off’ on 1 August 1945. It immediately re-commissioned on the same day as HMS Tern II. Six weeks later it decommissioned for a second time, on 15 September and the airbase was reduced to care and maintenance.

== History ==
In 1939 an Admiralty representative sought the advice of Ted Fresson on the best site for an airfield in Orkney. Fresson, the founder of Highland Airways and now working for Scottish Airways, recommended the site at Hatston. Fresson had earlier wanted to create an airfield there, but the land owner had refused him. Fresson warned that the location would become very muddy and unsuitable for modern aircraft, and recommended that asphalt runways be built. Thus once the airfield was established later that year, it was probably the first in Britain to have hard runways. The airfield was declared operational in early 1940.

During the Second World War, it was host to a number of different types of aircraft of the Fleet Air Arm, including Fairey Swordfish, Blackburn Rocs, Grumman Martlet IV and Grumman Avengers. Two squadrons of Blackburn Skuas flew from Hatston on 10 April 1940, on a mission to sink the German cruiser Königsberg, in which they were successful.

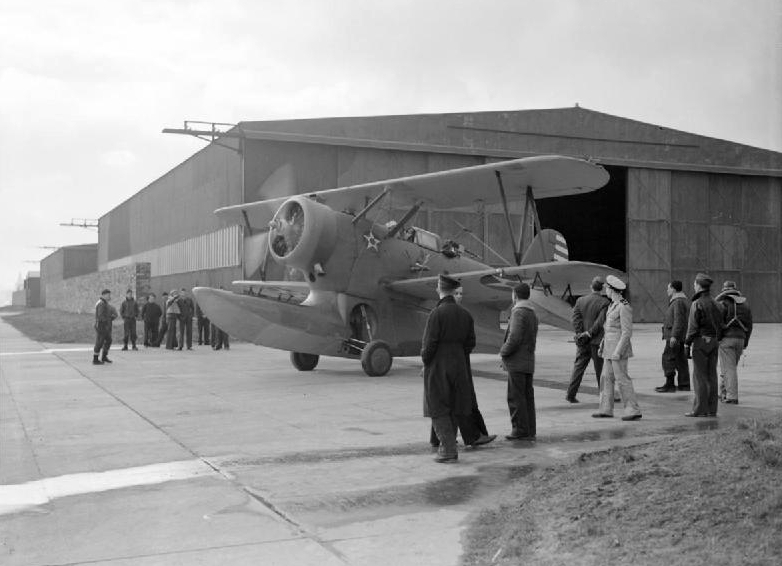
A US Navy Grumman J2F Duck at RNAS Hatston in 1942

From April 1942 a number of United States Navy squadrons operated out of RNAS Hatston, the airbase being used by American aircraft including Douglas TBD Devastator, an American torpedo bomber, Grumman F4F Wildcat, an American carrier-based fighter aircraft and Vought SB2U Vindicator, an American carrier-based dive bomber.

=== Second World War (1939–1945) ===
During the Second World War large numbers of various front line Fleet Air Arm squadrons and their associated aircraft used RNAS Hatston for short periods of time after disembarking from Royal Navy aircraft carriers before they anchored in Scapa Flow. Two Fleet Air Arm units did have a more permanent presence at the airbase. 700 Naval Air Squadron (700 NAS), which provided final training for catapult aircraft aircrew before they embarked on their assigned ships, formed at the airbase in 1940 remaining until moving the short distance to nearby RNAS Twatt (HMS Tern) during 1942. 771 Naval Air Squadron (771 NAS), a Fleet Requirements Unit (FRU), was based at RNAS Hatston from 1939, relocating around the same time as 700 NAS to RNAS Twatt, in 1942. It operated a number of different aircraft types, undertaking various tasks, supporting the Home Fleet at Scapa Flow.

One of the functions of the airbase was to provide an airfield to a Fleet Requirements Unit, which was tasked with operational training for the Home Fleet, which was based in Scapa Flow.

771 Naval Air Squadron had formed at RNAS Lee-on-Solent (HMS Daedalus) with a northern and southern element. The southern part became its own squadron and the northern flight became solely 771 NAS, stationed at RNAS Hatston (HMS Sparrowhawk) in support of the Home Fleet, which was based at the wartime anchorage at Scapa Flow, carrying out various types of exercises with the ships and providing target-towing facilities for the naval gunners. It was equipped with Hawker Henley, a two-seat target tug, Blackburn Skua, an aircraft carrier-based dive bomber/fighter aircraft, Blackburn Roc, an aircraft carrier-based turret fighter and Fairey Swordfish, a biplane torpedo bomber. Later, Bristol Blenheim, a British light bomber and a couple of Martin Maryland, an American light bomber, were received. It was one of the latter aircraft which started a chain of events that led to the sinking of the German battleship Bismarck. On 22 May 1941, a Martin Maryland of 771 NAS was undertaking a reconnaissance flight to Bergen in weather considered by RAF Coastal Command to be unsuitable. The aircrew discovered that Bismark had left a Norwegian fjord. In July 1942, 771 NAS moved to RNAS Twatt.

700 Naval Air Squadron formed at RNAS Hatston on 21 January 1940 as a result of amalgamating the 700 series of Catapult Squadrons. It was initially equipped with forty-two Supermarine Walrus, eleven Fairey Seafox and twelve Fairey Swordfish foatplanes. From July, a small number of Supermarine Walrus operated from RAF Sullom Voe, designated as the Shetland Flight, with aircraft and crews from RNAS Hatston and disembarked Flights from the Home Fleet. These carried out local anti-submarine patrols and shipping escort under the control of No. 18 Group RAF, within RAF Coastal Command. In November the squadron took over the 701 Naval Air Squadron aircraft which were operating from Stornoway harbour and this became known as 700 Stornoway Flight. This Flight moved to RAF Sullom Voe and joined the Shetland Flight, in March 1941, but this then disbanded in May, when RAF aircraft became available.

In June 1942 700 NAS moved its HQ, known as ‘A’ Flight, to RNAS Twatt (HMS Tern). By this time the squadron provided a ten-week training course for new catapult Flights. The final two weeks of the course were spent attached to ‘A’ Flight at RNAS Hatston for final training, before joining their allocated ship. The training was broken down into an initial three weeks of aerodrome flying, consisting circuits and landings, dive-bombing, photography and anti-submarine warfare, at RNAS Donibristle (HMS Merlin), in Fife. A second three-week block was spent at RNAS Dundee (HMS Condor II), a seaplane base / repair depot, in Dundee, where the focus was on water operations, which included night landings. Week seven was a catapult course aboard HMS Pegasus, a Royal Navy aircraft carrier/seaplane carrier, in the Irish Sea. Week eight was then a return to RNAS Donibristle (HMS Merlin).

== Units ==
List of first and second line squadrons, station flight and other flying units based at this location:

- 700 NAS, 701 NAS, 712 NAS, 746 NAS, 771 NAS
- 800 NAS, 801 NAS, 802 NAS, 803 NAS, 804 NAS, 806 NAS, 807 NAS, 809 NAS,
- 810 NAS, 811 NAS, 812 NAS, 813 NAS, 814 NAS, 816 NAS, 817 NAS, 818 NAS, 819 NAS,
- 820 NAS, 821 NAS, 822 NAS, 823 NAS, 824 NAS, 825 NAS, 826 NAS, 827 NAS, 828 NAS, 829 NAS,
- 830 NAS, 831 NAS, 832 NAS, 833 NAS, 835 NAS, 836M Flight, 837 NAS, 837D Flight,
- 840 NAS, 841 NAS, 842 NAS, 845 NAS, 846 NAS, 848 NAS, 852 NAS, 853 NAS, 856 NAS,
- 860 NAS, 878 NAS, 880 NAS, 881 NAS, 882 NAS, 883 NAS, 884 NAS, 885 NAS, 887 NAS, 888 NAS,
- 890 NAS, 891 NAS, 893 NAS, 894 NAS, 896 NAS, 898 NAS, 899 NAS,
- 1770 NAS, 1771 NAS,
- 1820 NAS, 1840 NAS, 1841 NAS, 1842 NAS,
- No. 254 Squadron RAF

== Post Royal Navy and current use ==
After the Second World War, the aerodrome of RNAS Hatston, became Kirkwall's main civil airport and was served by both Allied Airways and Scottish Airways, which were absorbed by British European Airways (BEA) in 1947. By 1948 BEA was operating Douglas Dakota transport aircraft which were deemed too large to use the runways safely. They moved operations to a larger airfield, RAF Grimsetter, 3 miles (4.8 km) south-east of Kirkwall. RNAS Hatston was officially closed in 1948, but from 1953 until 1957 was the home of the Orkney Flying Club.

Finally it was closed and turned into an industrial estate, with some buildings becoming council housing. Several local street names commemorate the airfield, including Sparrowhawk Road, Seafire Road, Swordfish Road, Skua Road, Dakota Road and Gladiator Road.

== See also ==
- Military history of Scotland
- Naval air station
