= HNLMS Karel Doorman (R81) =

Colossus class aircraft carrier

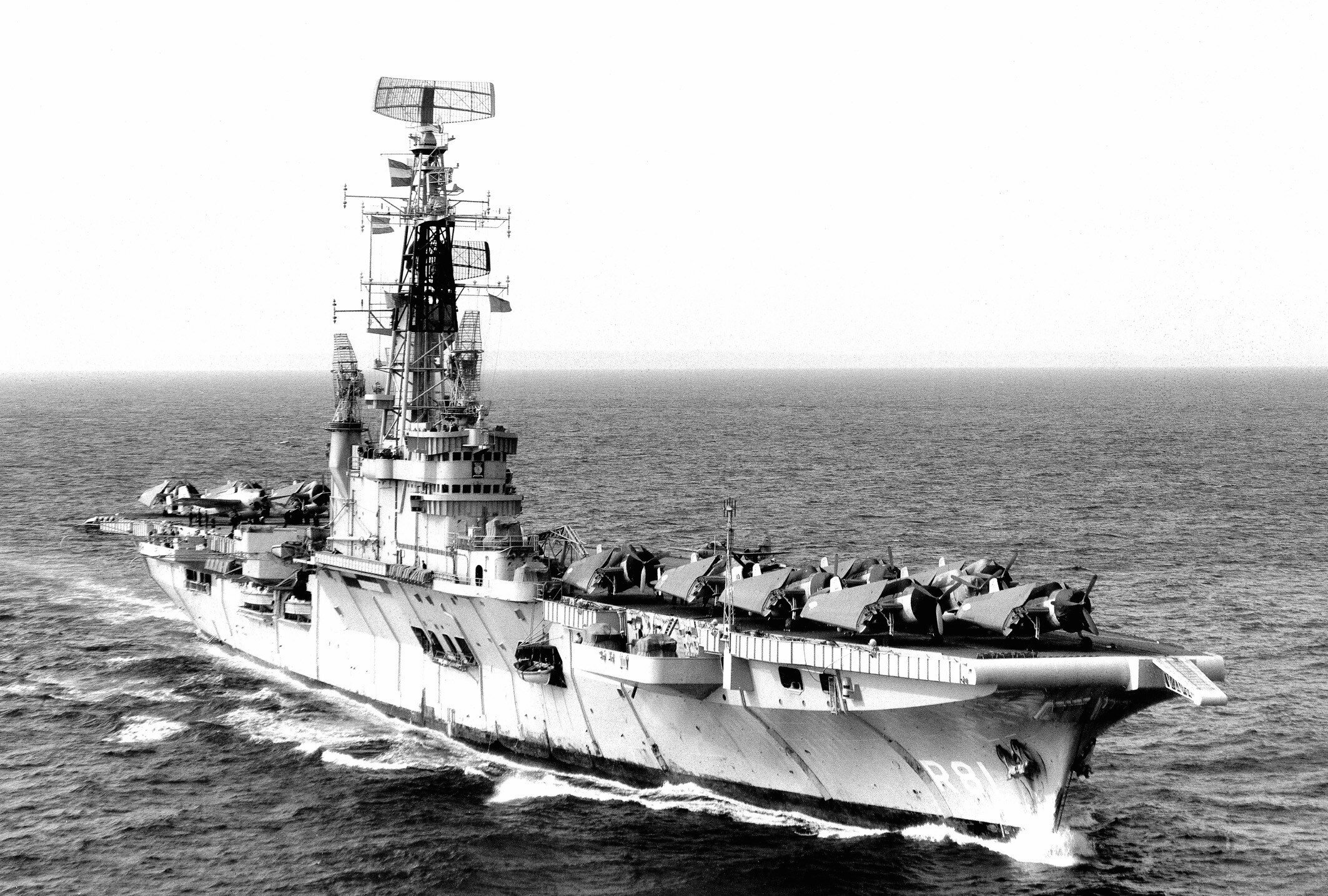
- HNLMS Karel Doorman

History

United Kingdom
- Name: HMS Venerable
- Ordered: 7 August 1942
- Builder: Cammell Laird
- Yard number: 1126
- Laid down: 3 December 1942
- Launched: 30 December 1943
- Commissioned: 27 November 1944
- Decommissioned: April 1947
- Identification: Pennant number R63
- Fate: Sold to the Netherlands, 1 April 1948

Netherlands
- Name: HNLMS Karel Doorman
- Namesake: Karel Doorman
- Acquired: 1 April 1948
- Commissioned: 28 May 1948
- Decommissioned: 29 April 1968
- Refit: 1955-1958; 1965-1966
- Identification: R81
- Fate: Sold to Argentina, 15 October 1968

Argentina
- Name: ARA Veinticinco de Mayo
- Namesake: Date of the May Revolution
- Acquired: 15 October 1968
- Commissioned: 12 March 1969
- Decommissioned: 1997
- Out of service: Inoperable by 1990
- Refit: 1969
- Home port: Puerto Belgrano Naval Base
- Identification: V-2
- Fate: Provided spare parts for Minas Gerais and remainder was scrapped in 2000

General characteristics
- Class & type: Colossus-class aircraft carrier
- Displacement: 19,900 tons
- Length: 192 m (629 ft 11 in)
- Beam: 24.4 m (80 ft 1 in)
- Draught: 7.5 m (24 ft 7 in)
- Installed power: 40,000 shp (30 MW)
- Propulsion: 4 × Admiralty 3-drum boilers; 2 × Parsons geared steam turbines; 2 × propeller shafts
- Speed: 25 kn (46 km/h; 29 mph)
- Complement: 1,300
- Armament: 12 x Bofors 40 mm L/60 gun Anti-Aircraft guns

HNLMS Karel Doorman (R81) (Dutch: Hr.Ms. Karel Doorman (R81)) was a Colossus-class aircraft carrier of the Royal Netherlands Navy. Formerly the British ship HMS Venerable, she was sold to the Netherlands in 1948 as a light attack carrier. In 1960, she was involved in the West New Guinea dispute with Indonesia. In the mid-1960s, her role was changed to anti-submarine warfare carrier and only ASW aircraft and helicopters were carried. An engine room fire took her out of service in 1968. She was sold to Argentina in 1969 and renamed ARA Veinticinco de Mayo.

== Purchase ==
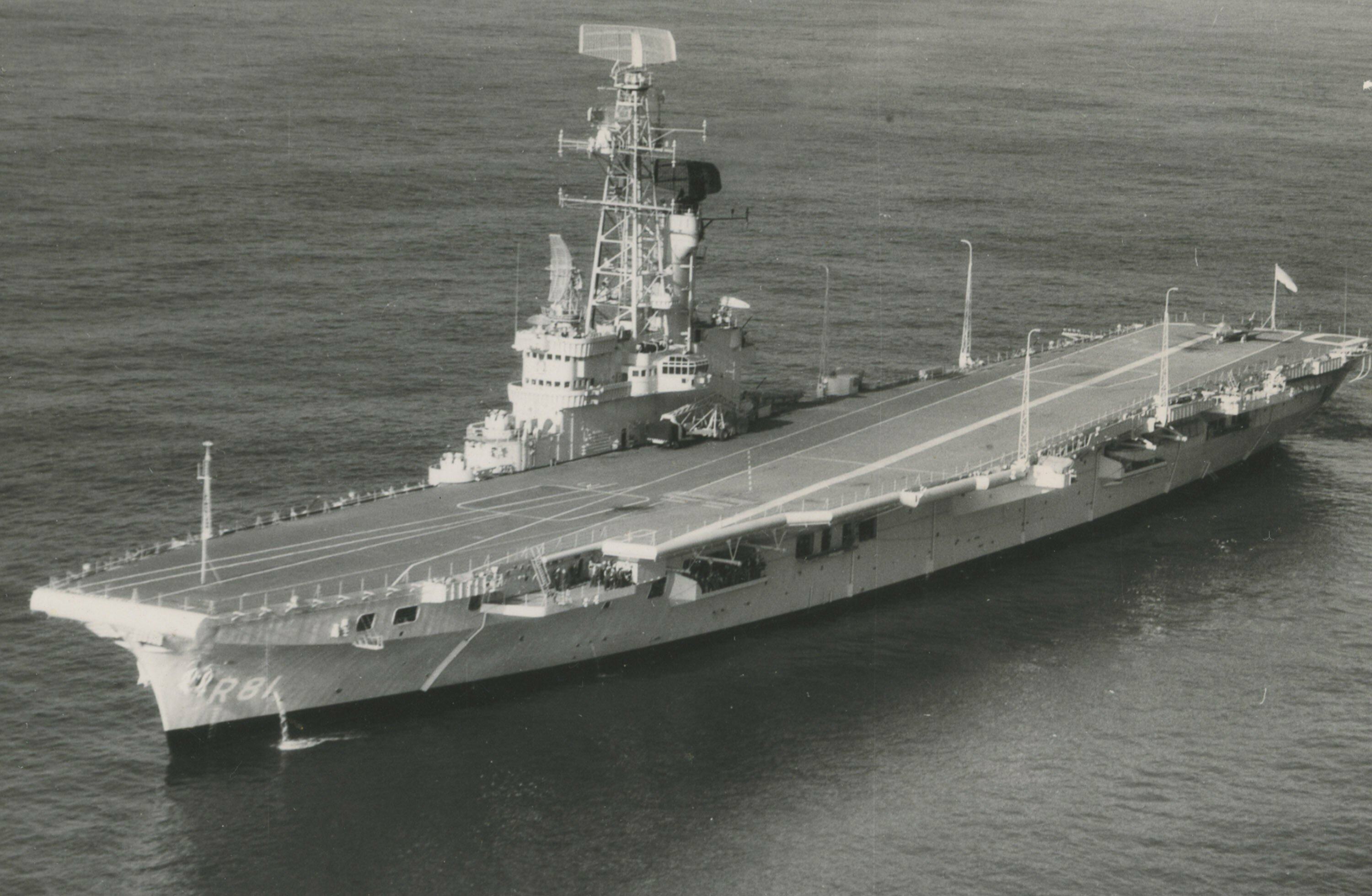
The Karel Doorman was substantially rebuilt with a new, angled (8°) flight deck, steam catapult, elevators, island etc. Seen here in 1958.

Built at Cammell Laird in Birkenhead on 3 December 1942, Venerable was launched just over a year later and commissioned on 17 January 1945.

In 1948, Venerable's short career in the Royal Navy came to an end when she was sold to the Netherlands and recommissioned as HNLMS Karel Doorman, replacing a smaller Nairana-class escort carrier of the same name while in Dutch service.

In 1955-58 she was rebuilt with an 8° angled flight deck, new elevators, new island, 40 mm anti-aircraft guns, steam catapult, and all new aviation facilities and electronics were fitted, including a Dutch-built new radar. At the same time, a similar Dutch rebuild was done to her sister ship, the Minas Gerais.

== Cruises ==
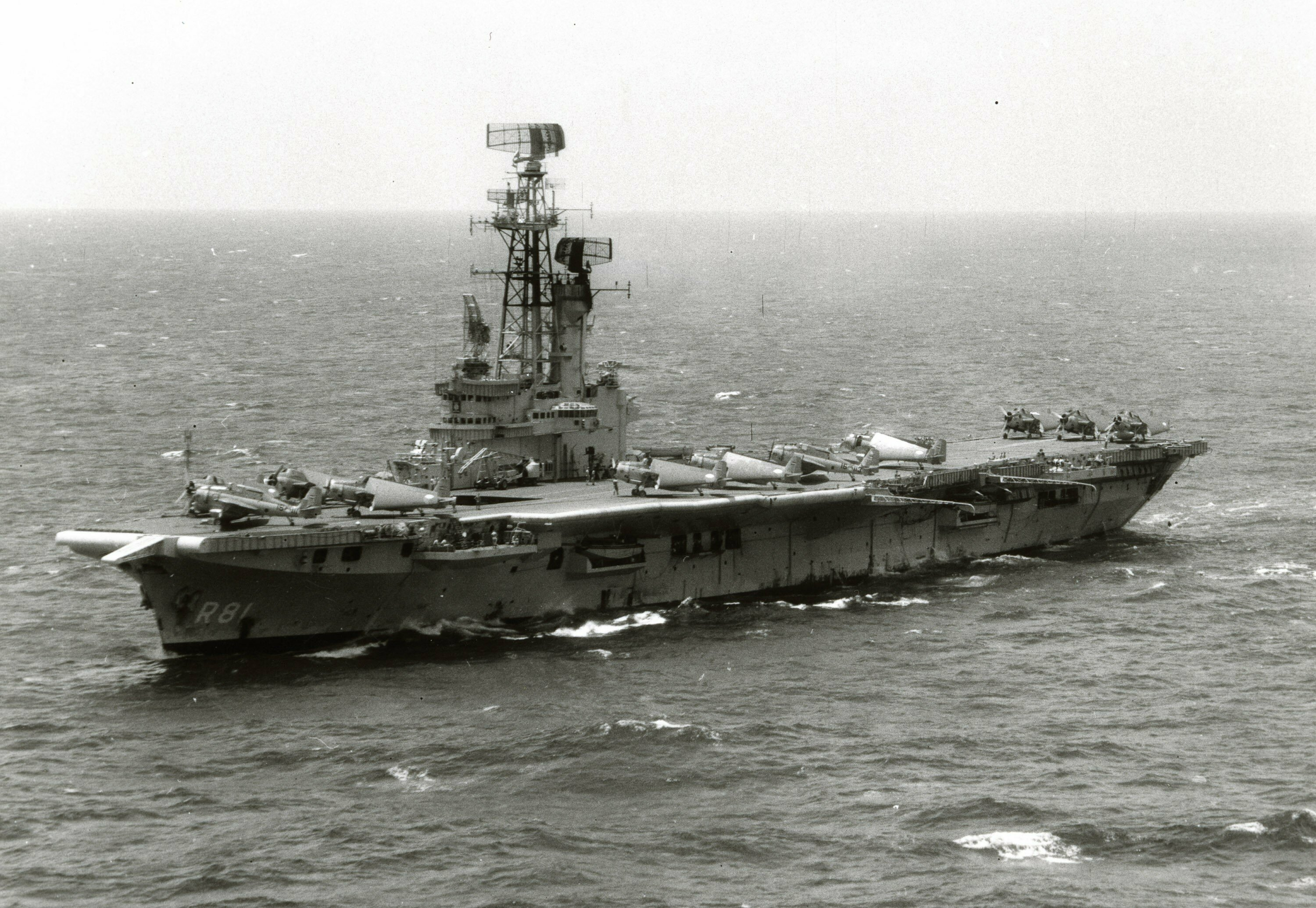
Karel Doorman on her cruise to the United States and Antilles in 1959.

Karel Doorman, frigate Johan Maurits van Nassau, and light cruiser Jacob van Heemskerck made a voyage to the Netherlands Antilles on 2 January 1950. Embarked on Karel Doorman was Prince Bernhard. The ships returned to the Netherlands on 4 May.

In 1954, during a North American cruise, she visited Montreal, Quebec, Canada for an air show appearance.

Early in 1959 the ship made a trip to the United States (Newport, Rhode Island, and Fort Lauderdale, Florida) and then continued on to visit the Antilles again.

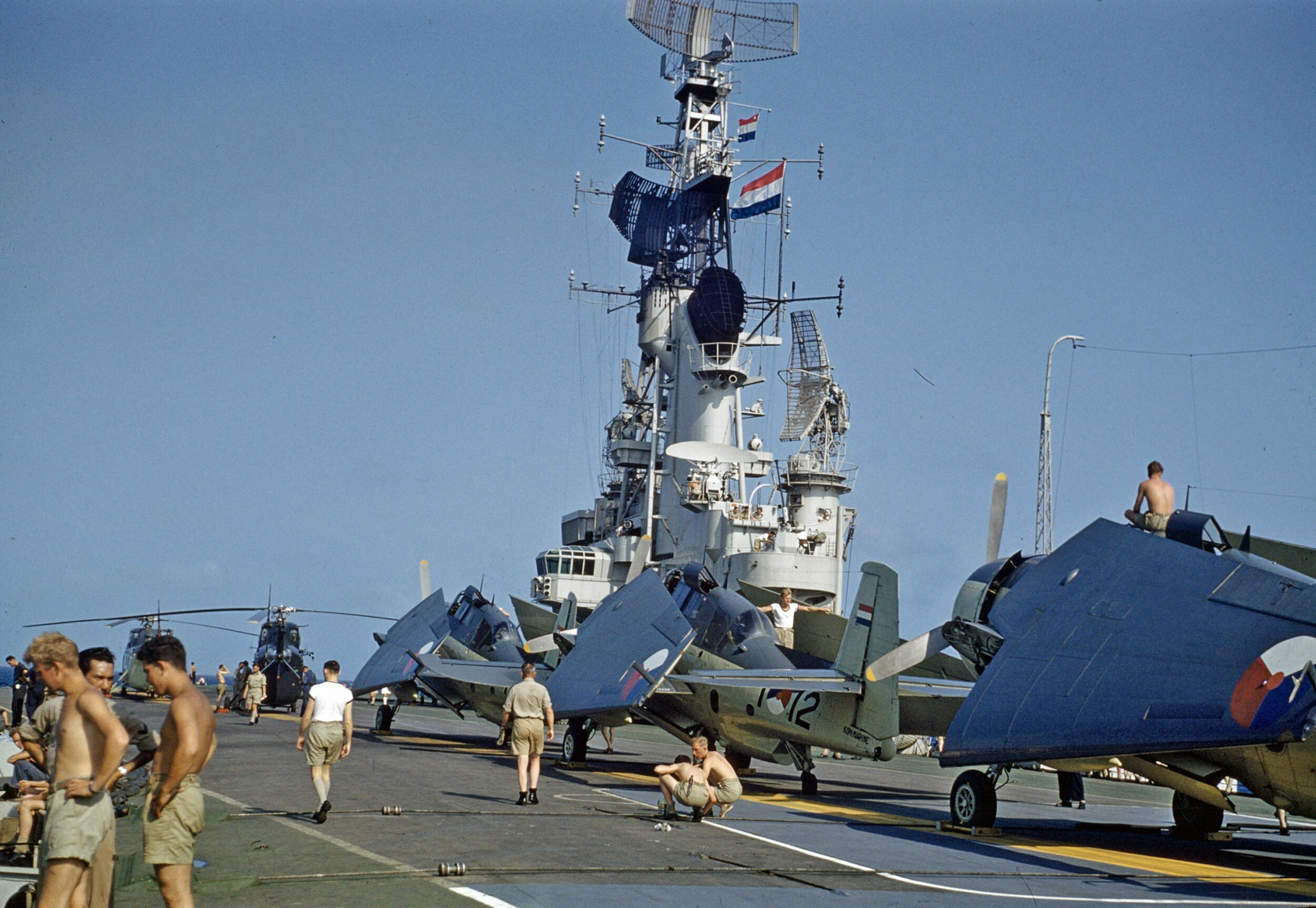
Aircraft parked on the flight deck of Karel Doorman

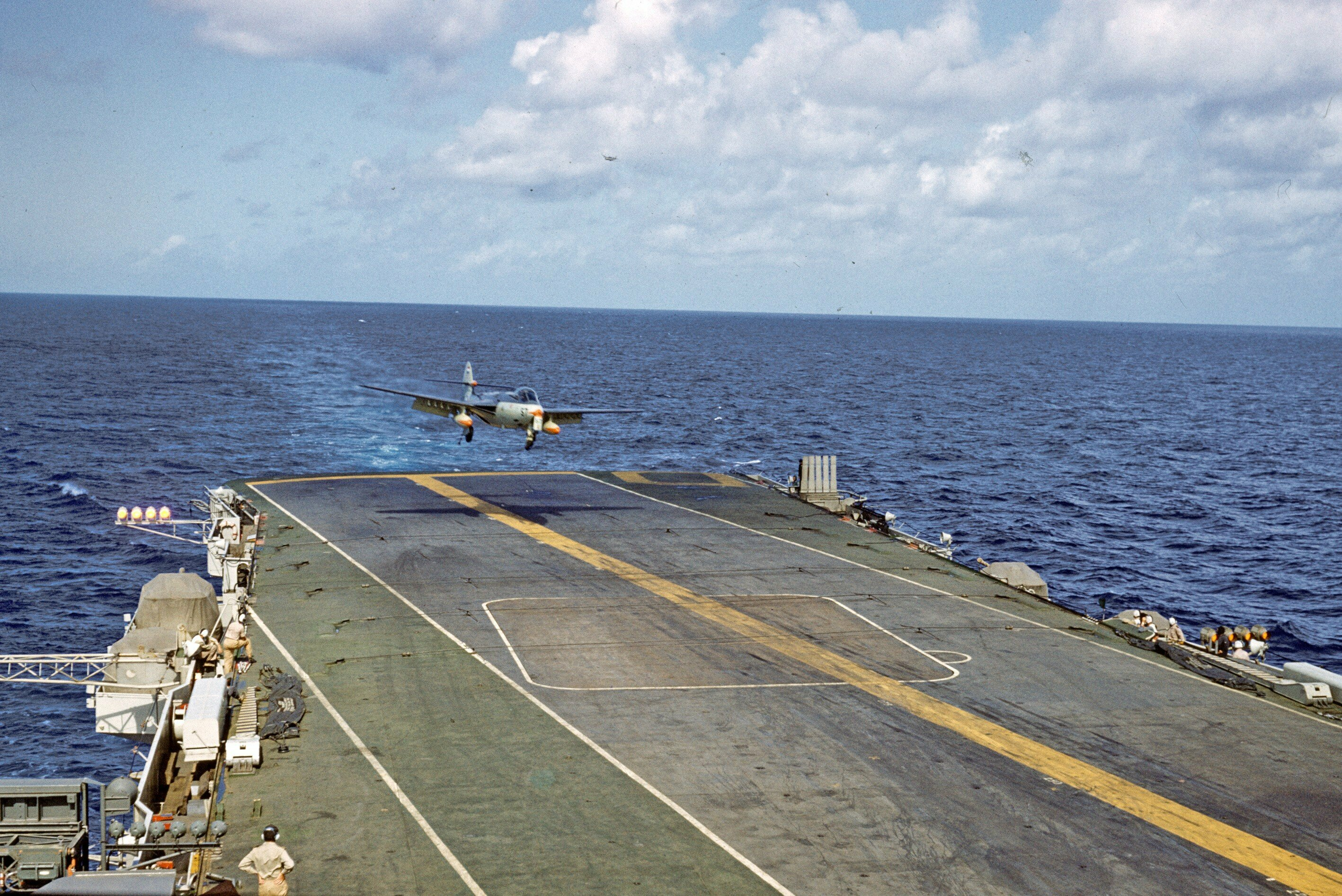
Flight operations onboard the Karel Doorman; Hawker Sea Hawk on approach.

In 1960, during the Dutch decolonization and planned independence of Western New Guinea, a territory which was also claimed by Indonesia, Karel Doorman set sail along with two destroyers and a modified oil tanker to "show the flag". In order to avoid possible problems with Indonesia's ally Egypt at the Suez Canal, she instead sailed around the Horn of Africa. She arrived in Fremantle, Australia, where the local seamen's union went on strike in sympathy with Indonesia; the crew used the propeller thrust of aircraft chained down on deck to nudge the carrier into dock without tugs. In addition to her air wing, she was ferrying twelve Hawker Hunter fighters to bolster the local Dutch defence forces, which she delivered when she arrived at Hollandia, New Guinea. Karel Doorman was also to have visited Yokohama, Japan during this Asian cruise to celebrate the 350th anniversary of the establishment of Japanese-Dutch diplomatic relations but, due to Indonesian and local protests, Japan withdrew its invitation.

During her maintenance between 20 December 1960 and 10 April 1961 a TACAN antenna was installed on her mast.

After the 1964 refit, Karel Doorman served the rest of her career mostly conducting NATO anti-submarine patrols in the north Atlantic, no longer carrying strike or fighter aircraft as part of her regular air wing. Karel Doorman also regularly conducted various exercises near Scotland during her career.

On 19 March 1965 Karel Doorman hit a rock at the Oslofjord, while evading a Norwegian tugboat. The collision caused significant damage to the bow, which had to be repaired at Wilton-Fijenoord.

=== Western New Guinea Crisis ===
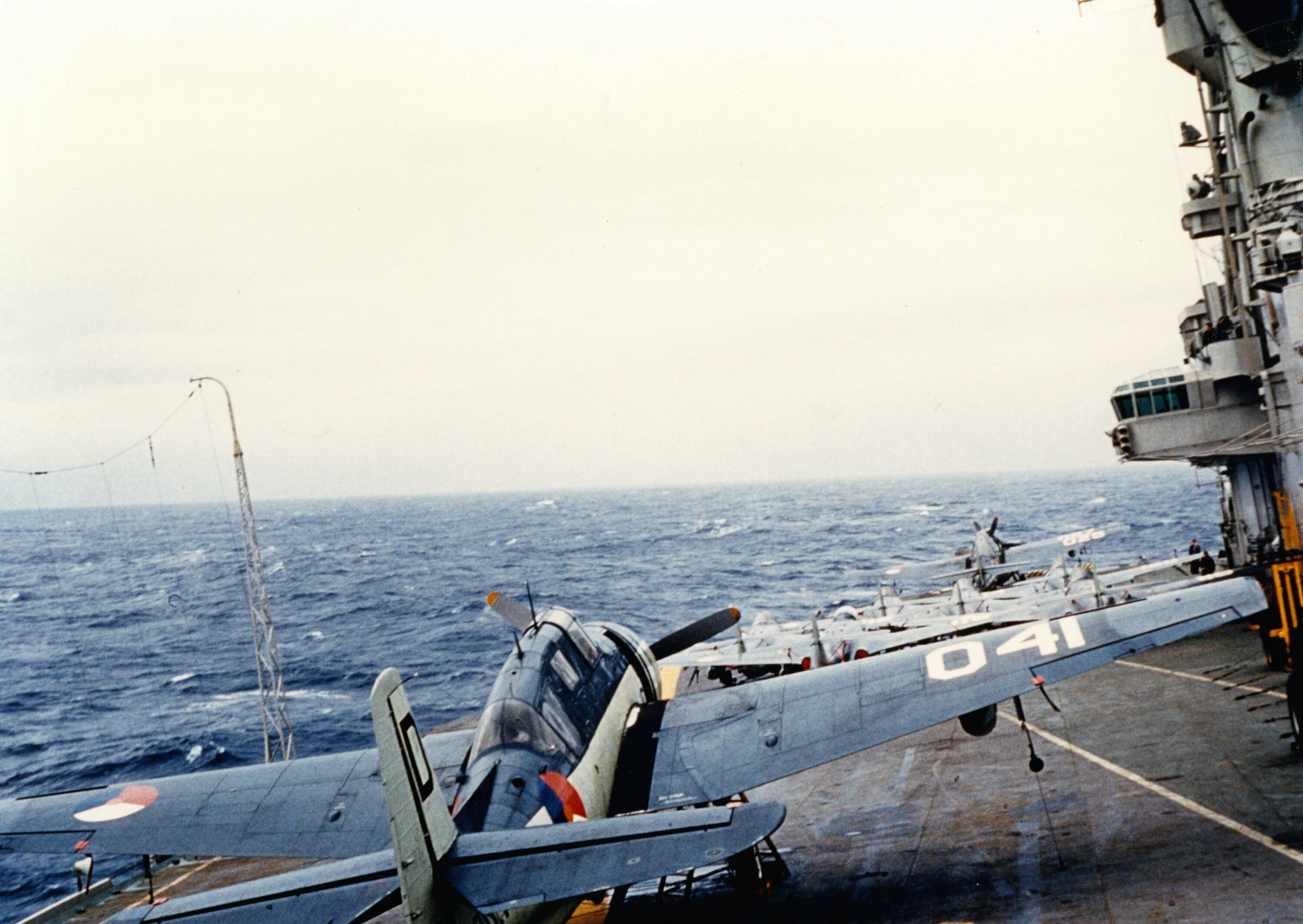
Karel Doorman in the high seas, 1960

During the 1960 crisis, Indonesia prepared for a military action named Operation Trikora. For an invasion, the Indonesian Air Forces (TNI-AU) hoped to sink this aircraft carrier with Soviet-supplied Tupolev Tu-16KS-1 Badger naval bombers using AS-1 Kennel / KS-1 Kometa anti-ship missiles (six planes were intended for the attack on Karel Doorman). This bomber launched missile strike mission was cancelled because of the ceasefire between Indonesia and the Netherlands; this led to a Dutch withdrawal and United Nations temporary peacekeeping administration followed by handover of Western New Guinea to Indonesia.

== Decommissioning ==
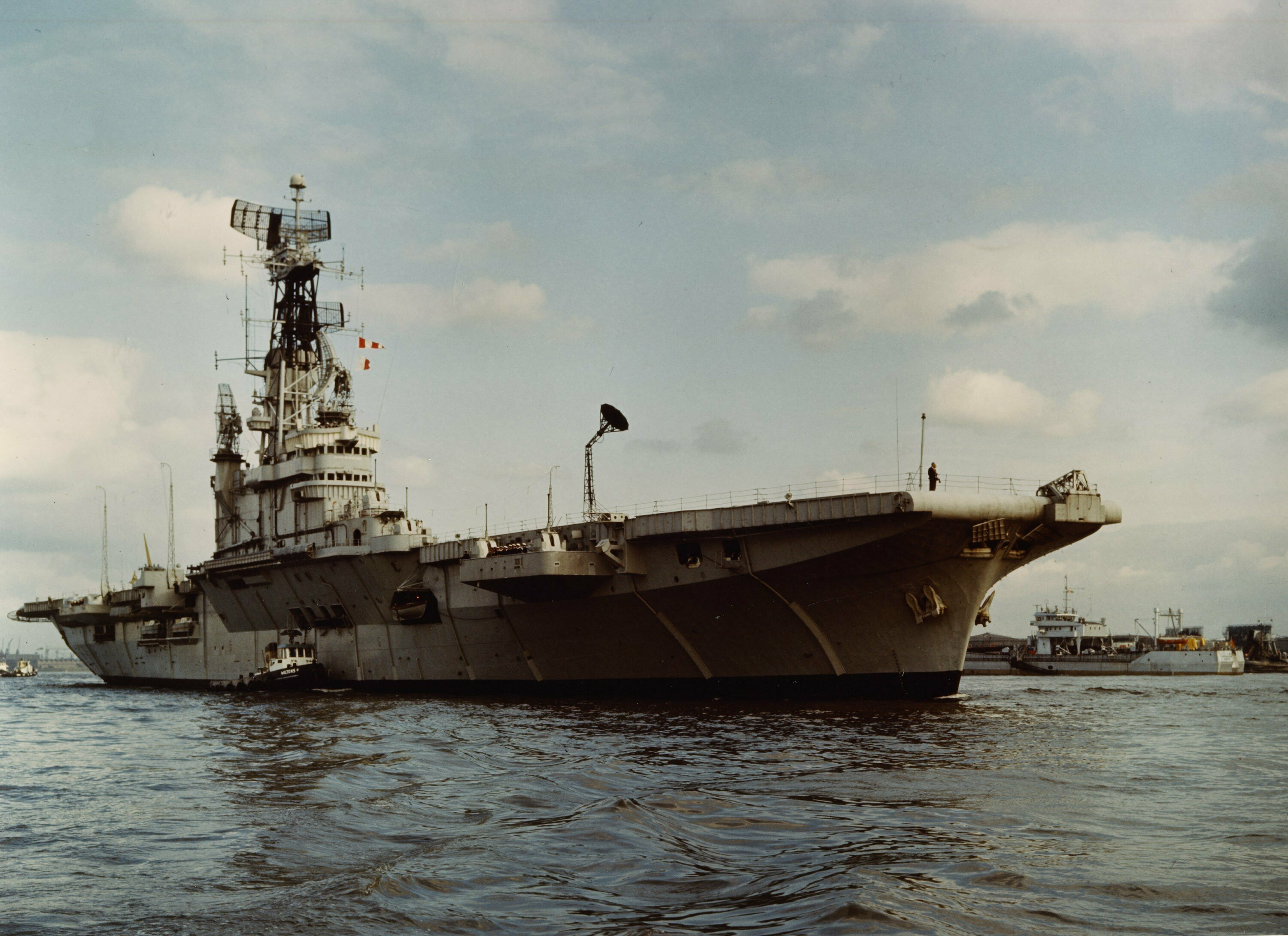
Karel Doorman in 1969 following repairs in preparation for her transfer to Argentina.

In 1964, following the settlement of issues threatening its former colonial territories and changes in the mission for the Royal Netherlands Navy within NATO, coupled with the huge costs for operating and maintaining an aircraft carrier, it was decided to withdraw her from the operational fleet by the early 1970s. This was to coincide with the arrival of long range maritime patrol aircraft that were to take over the ASW role Karel Doorman had been tasked to perform ever since the start of the 1960s.

A boiler room fire on 26 April 1968 removed her from Dutch service. To repair the fire damage, new boilers were transplanted from the incomplete HMS Leviathan, at the Wilton-Fijenoord shipyard in Rotterdam. In 1969, the costs for repairing the damage were compared to the relatively short time Karel Doorman was still to serve in the fleet; this comparison proved to be her undoing. She was sold to the Argentine Navy, renamed Veinticinco de Mayo, where she would later play a role in the 1982 Falklands War.

In the late 1960s, the NATO anti-submarine commitment was taken over by a squadron of Westland Wasp helicopters operated from six Van Speijk-class anti-submarine frigates and two squadrons of shore based maritime patrol aircraft. These were one squadron of Breguet Atlantique sea-reconnaissance aircraft and one of P-2 Neptunes.

== Air wing ==
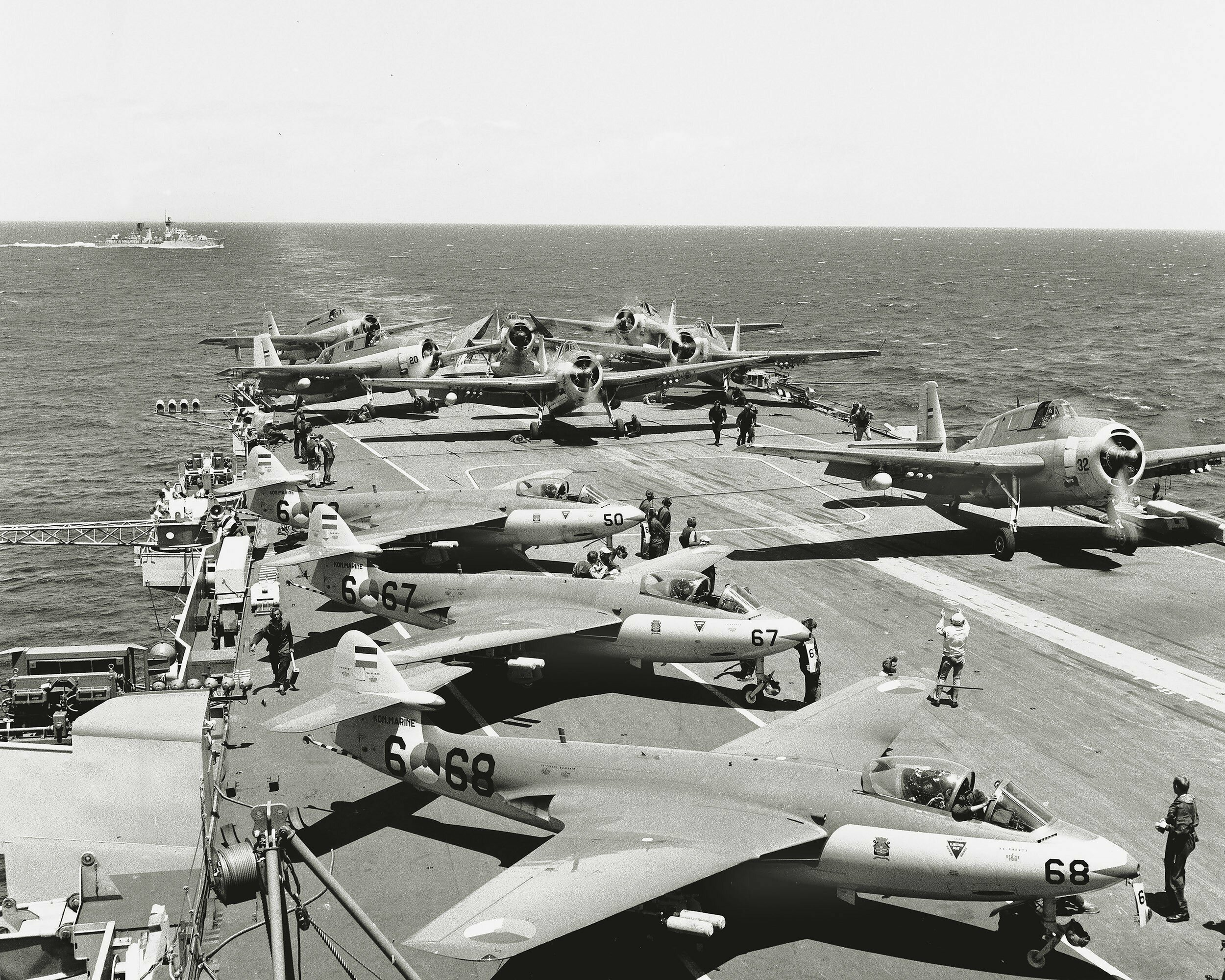
The unusual air wing carried by the Karel Doorman: Sea Hawks and ASW Avenger aircraft.

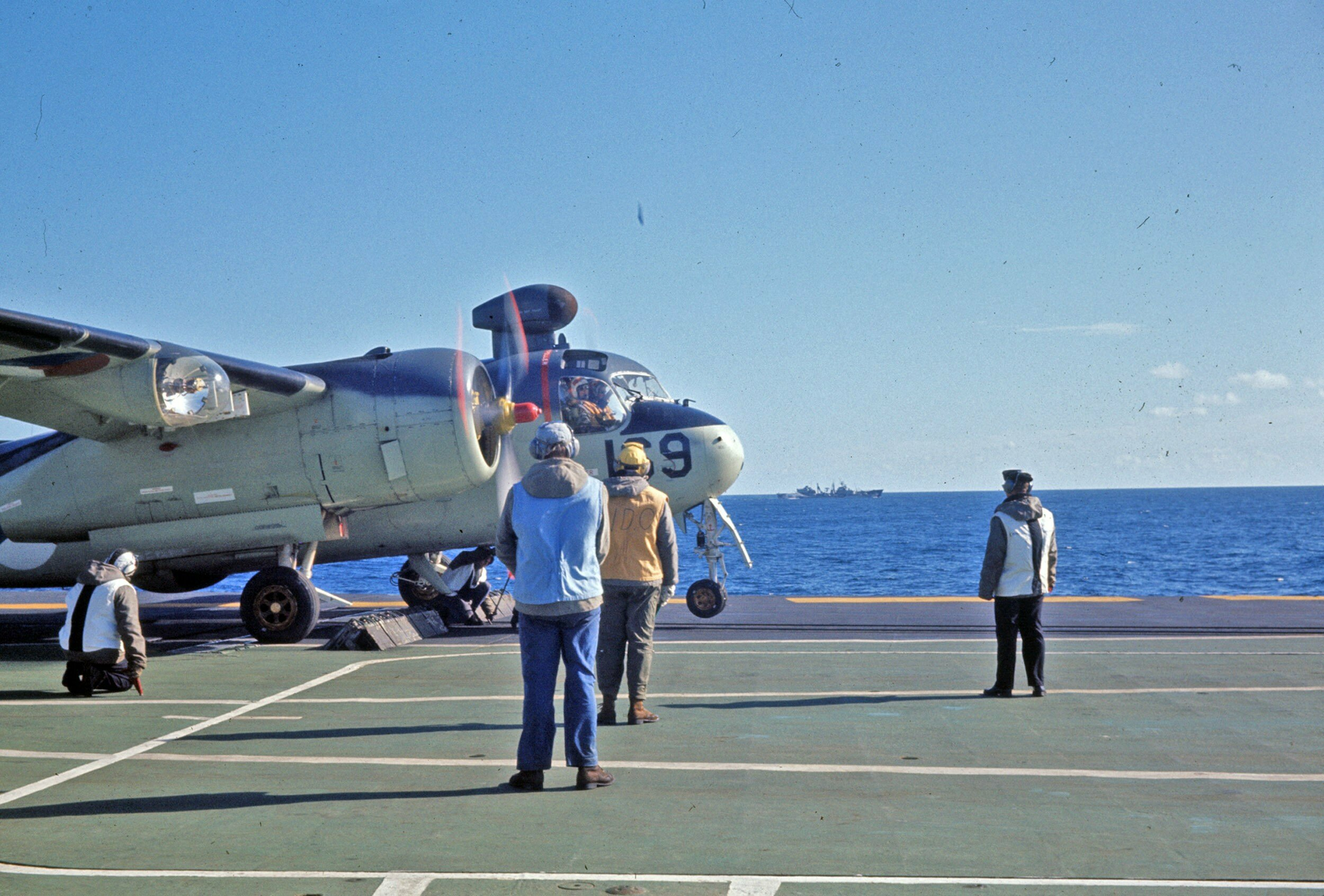
Royal Netherlands Navy S2F-1 Tracker being prepared for catapult-assisted take-off.

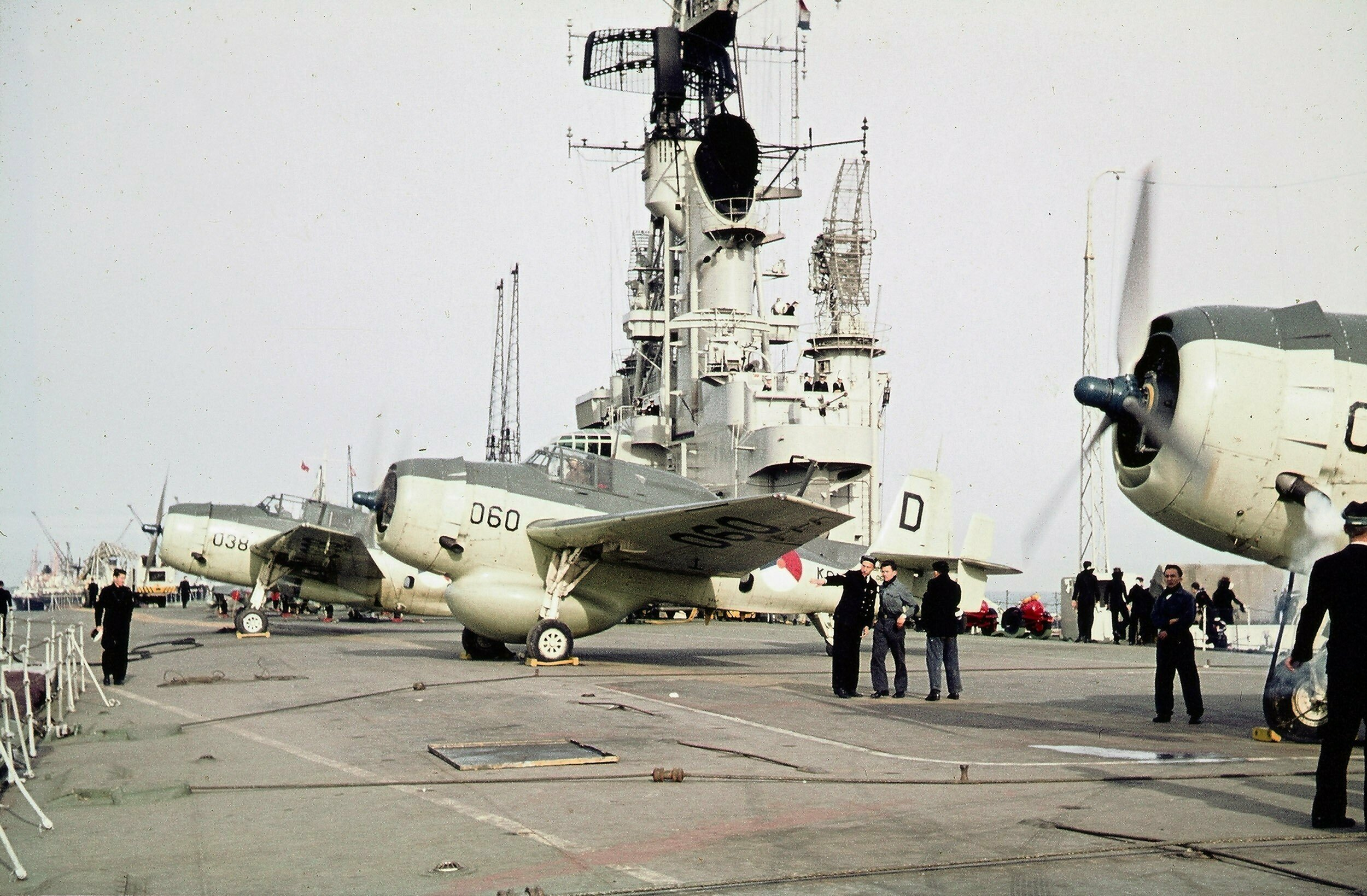
TBM-3S2 (anti-submarine) and TBM-3W2 (airborne early warning radar) Avenger aircraft lined up on the flight deck of Karel Doorman.

First deploying as an attack carrier with 24 World War II era propeller driven Fairey Firefly strike fighters and Hawker Sea Fury fighters, for sea rescue a Supermarine Sea Otter flying boat was carried, it was replaced by a Sikorsky S-51 helicopter.

From 1958, she operated with an ASW/Strike profile with up to 14 Grumman TBF Avenger ASW/torpedo bombers, 10 Hawker Sea Hawk fighters (a first generation naval jet fighter considered by the larger naval powers to be undersized and nearly obsolete at the time of delivery to the Dutch) and 2 Sikorsky S-55 ASW helicopters.

In 1960, the Royal Netherlands Navy received 17 Canadian built Grumman S-2 Tracker ASW aircraft formerly used by the Royal Canadian Navy. Changing roles to a dedicated NATO antisubmarine warfare carrier, a wing of 8 Grumman S-2 Trackers and 6 Sikorsky S-58 ASW helicopters served aboard from 1961 until the 1968 shipboard fire and removal from Dutch service.

From 1959, Dutch Sea Hawks were equipped with Sidewinder missiles that significantly enhanced and extended their air-to-air combat capabilities. While never engaged in combat, the aircraft were present as a carrier based deterrent during the 1962 New Guinea Indonesia crisis. They served aboard between 1957 and 1964 until Karel Doorman's overhaul, after which the attack role was eliminated and 22 aircraft were transferred to land based reserve storage - they were all retired from service by the end of the 1960s after the sale of Karel Doorman to Argentina.

== See also ==
- List of aircraft carriers
