= 1942 Design Light Fleet Carrier =

1940s class of aircraft carriers of the Royal Navy

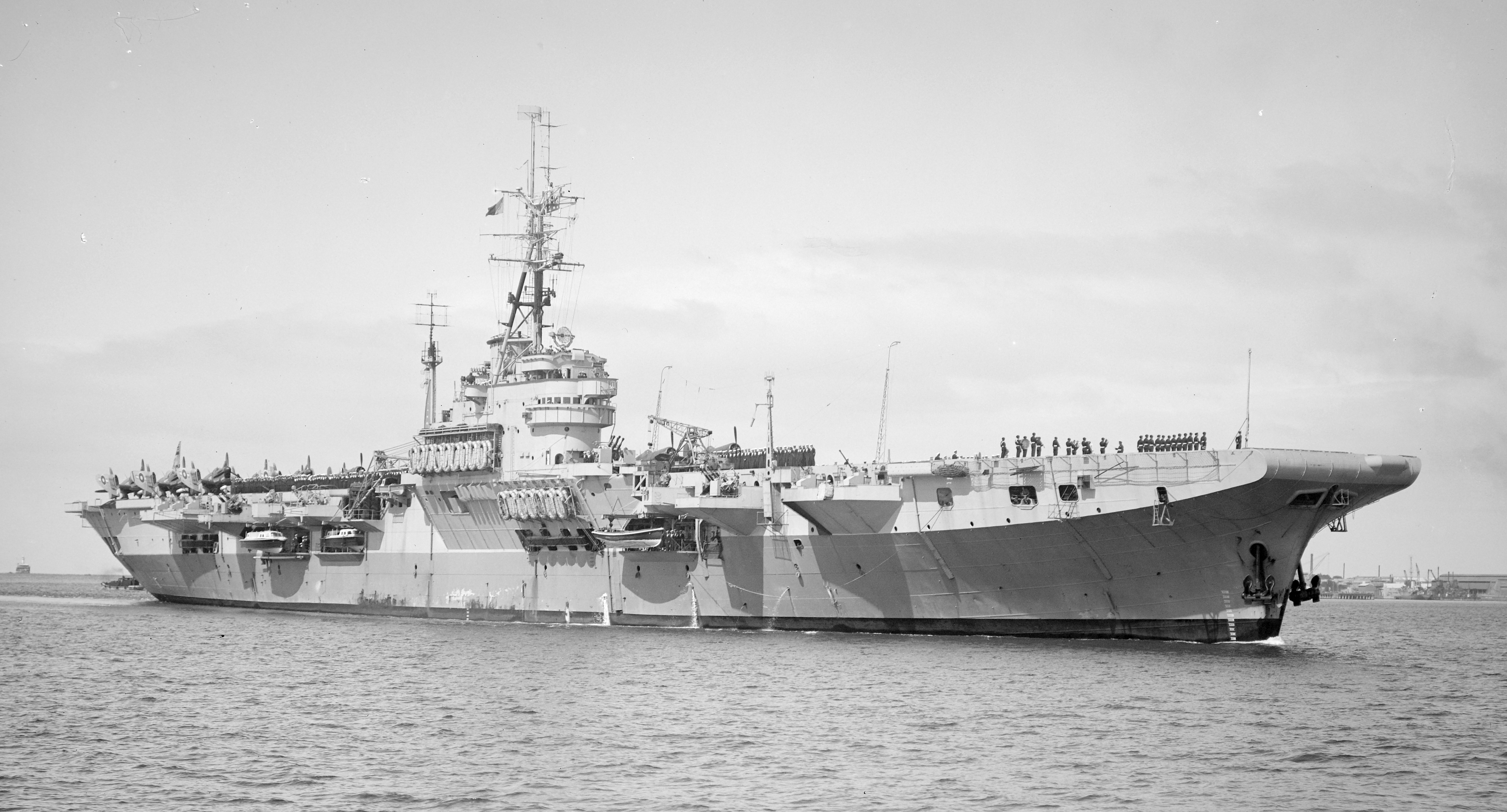
- HMS Glory in 1946

Class overview
- Operators: Royal Navy; Argentine Navy; Royal Australian Navy; Brazilian Navy; Royal Canadian Navy; French Navy; Indian Navy; Royal Netherlands Navy
- Succeeded by: Centaur class
- Subclasses: Colossus class; Majestic class
- Built: March 1942 – April 1961
- In commission: December 1944 – October 2001
- Planned: 16
- Completed: 8 Colossus class, plus 2 maintenance carriers; 5 Majestic class
- Canceled: 1
- Scrapped: 15

General characteristics (Colossus class: as designed)
- Displacement: 13,200 tons (standard); 18,000 tons (full load)
- Length: 690 ft (210 m) flight deck; 695 ft (212 m) overall
- Beam: 80 ft (24 m)
- Draught: 18 ft 6 in (5.64 m) standard; 23 ft 3 in (7.09 m) full load
- Propulsion: Parsons geared turbines; 4 × Admiralty 3-drum boilers; 40,000 shp (30,000 kW); 2 propeller shafts
- Speed: 25 knots (46 km/h; 29 mph)
- Range: 12,000 nautical miles (22,000 km; 14,000 mi) at 14 knots (26 km/h; 16 mph)
- Complement: 1,050
- Armament: 6 × 4-barrelled 2 pounder anti-aircraft guns; 16 × twin 20 mm Oerlikon mountings; All weapons later replaced by 40 mm Bofors in varying configurations
- Aircraft carried: Up to 52

General characteristics (Majestic class: as designed)
- Displacement: 15,750 tons (standard); 19,500 tons (full load)
- Draught: 19 ft 6 in (5.94 m) standard; 24 ft 9 in (7.54 m) full load
- Armament: 30 × 40 mm Bofors (6 twin mountings, 18 single mountings)
- Notes: Other characteristics as above

The 1942 Design Light Fleet Carrier, commonly referred to as the British Light Fleet Carrier, was a light aircraft carrier design created by the Royal Navy during the Second World War, and used by eight naval forces between 1944 and 2001. They were designed and constructed by civilian shipyards to serve as an intermediate step between the expensive, full-size fleet aircraft carriers and the less expensive but limited-capability escort carriers.

Sixteen Light Fleet carriers were ordered, and all were laid down to the Colossus class design during 1942 and 1943. However, only eight were completed to this design; of these, four entered service before the end of the war, and none saw front line operations. Two more were fitted with maintenance and repair facilities instead of aircraft catapults and arresting gear, and entered service as aircraft maintenance carriers. The final six were modified during construction to handle larger and faster aircraft, and were re-designated as the Majestic class. The construction of the six ships was suspended at the end of the war. Five were eventually completed with the last commissioning in 1961; however, the sixth, Leviathan, was dismantled for spare parts and scrap.

Although not completed in time to fight in the war, the carriers in Royal Navy service participated in the Korean War and the Suez Crisis. During the latter, two Colossus-class ships performed the first ship-based helicopter assault in history. Four Colossuses and all five completed Majestics were loaned or sold to seven foreign nations – Argentina, Australia, Brazil, Canada, France, India, and the Netherlands – with three ships serving in three different naval forces during their careers. Foreign-operated Light Fleets took part in the Korean War, the First Indochina War, the Vietnam War, the Indo-Pakistani War of 1971, and the Falklands War.

Despite being intended as 'disposable warships', all of the completed Light Fleet carriers exceeded their planned three-year service life. The maintenance carriers were the first to be paid off in the 1950s, and by the 1960s, all of the Royal Navy carriers, (bar Triumph, which was later recommissioned as a repair ship) had been sold to other nations or for ship breaking. The carriers in other navies had longer service lives. At the time of her decommissioning in 2001, Minas Gerais was the oldest active aircraft carrier in the world. Despite attempts to preserve several of these carriers as museum ships, the last surviving example, Vikrant, was sold for scrapping in 2014.

== Design and construction ==
Experiences during the early part of the Second World War had demonstrated to the British that the Royal Navy needed access to defensive air cover for Allied fleets and convoys, which could only be provided by more aircraft carriers. In mid-1941, the Director of Naval Construction was instructed to investigate how best to achieve this without the lengthy construction times normally associated with carriers. The options were to refit the surviving Hawkins-class cruisers with flight decks and aviation facilities, convert additional merchant vessels and passenger liners into vessels similar to but more capable than previous merchant aircraft carriers, or create a new design for a cheap, lightly armed, and unarmoured ship similar to the American escort carriers. In December 1941, it was decided that a new design was the best option.

This ship was conceived as an intermediate step between the expensive fleet carriers and the limited-capability escort carriers. The design had to be as simple as possible so construction time was kept to a minimum and so more shipyards (particularly those with no naval construction experience) could be used. However, the ships had to be capable of operating in fleet actions. Originally designated the 'Intermediate Aircraft Carrier', the ships were reclassified as 'Light Fleet Carriers'. Because naval design staff were overworked, the carrier was primarily designed by shipbuilders at Vickers-Armstrongs.

The Light Fleet design, completed at the start of 1942, was effectively a scaled-down Illustrious. Each carrier would displace 13,190 tons at standard load and 18,040 tons at full load, have a length of 690 feet (210 m) at the flight deck and 695 feet (212 m) overall, a maximum beam of 80 feet (24 m), and a draught of 18 feet 6 inches (5.64 m) at standard displacement, and 23 feet 6 inches (7.16 m) at full load displacement. The hull was built to Lloyd's specifications for merchant vessels from keel to maindeck, but incorporated better subdivision of compartments to reduce secondary damage by flooding.

The propulsion machinery was of a similar design to that used in cruisers—some of the steam turbines were sourced from cancelled cruisers. The machinery was arranged in two compartments (each containing two Admiralty 3-drum boilers and a Parsons geared turbine), which were staggered en echelon, with the starboard compartment forward of the port. These provided 40,000 shaft horsepower to two propeller shafts, driving the carriers at a maximum speed of 25 knots (46 km/h; 29 mph), with 15 knots (28 km/h; 17 mph) as the designated economical speed.

The carriers were intended to be 'disposable warships': to be scrapped and replaced at the end of the war or within three years of entering service. However, all exceeded this planned service life, with one ship operating from 1945 to 2001.

=== Colossus class ===
Construction was approved by the Board of Admiralty in February 1942, with the first two ships, Colossus and Glory, laid down in March. During 1942 and 1943, another fourteen Light Fleet carriers (named the Colossus class after the lead ship) were laid down under the 1942 Programme, to be constructed by eight British shipyards. Although it was originally planned that each Light Fleet would be ready for service in 21 months, modifications to the design saw the planned construction time increase to 27 months. Even with the omission of several important pieces of backup equipment, only two ships met this target.

The ships were launched from late 1943 onwards, with the first commissioned in December 1944. However, the delays meant that only four ships (Colossus, Glory, Venerable, and Vengeance; formed up as the 11th Aircraft Carrier Squadron) were completed before the end of the Second World War, and only eight of the sixteen planned Light Fleets were completed as Colossus-class carriers.

During operational service, the living conditions aboard the Colossus-class ships were criticised, which resulted in the abolition of hammocks in favour of fixed bunks and the introduction of centralised eating arrangements in later warship designs.

=== Maintenance carriers ===
The impracticality of shore-based repair establishments in the Far East and Pacific theatres of the Second World War saw a requirement for aircraft maintenance carriers. Instead of building new ships from scratch, two under-construction Colossuses, Perseus and Pioneer, were marked for conversion as they would enter service quicker, and could be converted back into operational aircraft carriers if required, a need which never arose. Both ships were completed before the end of the war, with Pioneer sailing to the Pacific in company with the 11th Aircraft Carrier Squadron; Pioneer had repaired 24 aircraft since her arrival in the Pacific.

As the ships were designed with the repair and transportation of aircraft in mind, much of the equipment required for carrier flight operations, including control facilities, arresting gear, and catapult, were not installed. This space was instead used for additional hangar room, repair and maintenance workshops, and system testing facilities.

=== Majestic class ===
The six remaining Light Fleet hulls were originally to be completed as Colossus-class ships, but the rapid development of carrier-based aircraft and anti-aircraft weapons required modifications to the original design. The catapult, arrestor cables, and aircraft lifts had to be upgraded to handle faster and heavier aircraft, while the flight deck was reinforced. Improved weapons and radars were fitted, and equipment to perform replenishment at sea was installed. The modifications increased the full-load displacement by 1,500 tons, and the draught by 1 foot 6 inches (0.46 m). This led to the six ships being reclassified as the Majestic class in September 1945. Five carriers were launched before the end of the Second World War, with the sixth launched in late September 1945.

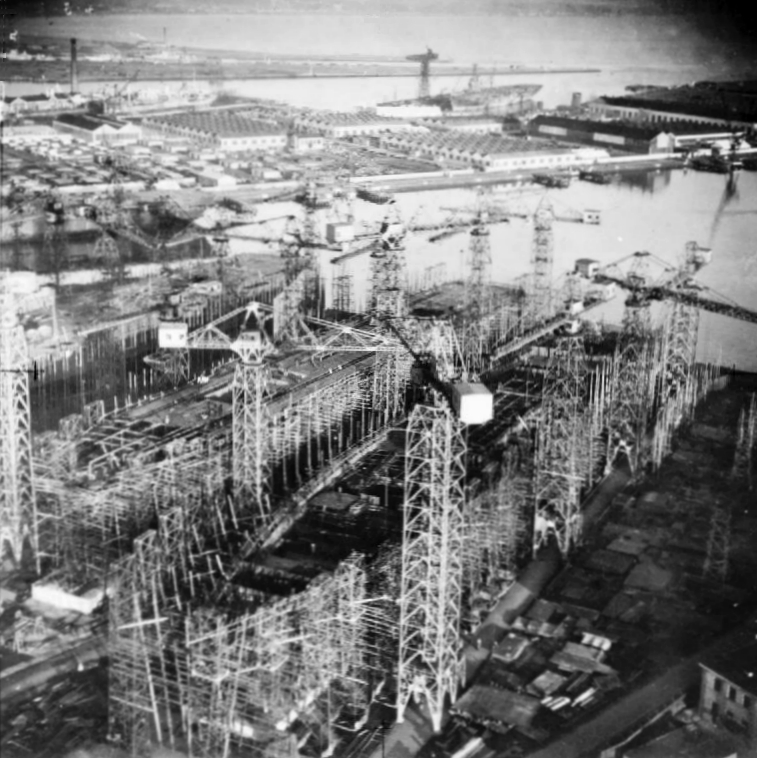
Magnificent (left) and Powerful under construction at Harland and Wolff in 1944

Following the war's end, work on the Majestic class was suspended, then restored to a low-priority status, with the rate of work increasing as foreign nations purchased the ships. Two, Magnificent and Terrible, entered service more-or-less as designed, but the next three were heavily upgraded with three British developments allowing the operation of larger, faster, jet-propelled aircraft: the angled flight deck, the steam catapult, and the mirror landing aid. The sixth, Leviathan, was not completed. Work was suspended in May 1946, and plans to convert her into a commando carrier or missile cruiser, or sell her to a foreign buyer, fell through. During the 1950s, she was used as an accommodation ship in Portsmouth Harbour and, in 1966, her boilers were removed and sold to the shipyard refitting the Colossus-class HNLMS Karel Doorman for Argentine service. Leviathan was scrapped in May 1968. None of the completed Majestic-class vessels saw service in the Royal Navy.

In 1943, eight 'Improved Majestics' were planned, but developments in carrier aviation and the rapid obsolescence of the Light Fleets and the wartime armoured carriers required a larger and more capable design, which became the four-ship Centaur class.

== Weapons ==
=== Aircraft ===
In the original design, each ship was capable of carrying 41 aircraft. A redesign of the available parking area on the flight deck in March 1942 saw the ships' air group expanded to 24 Fairey Barracuda torpedo bombers and 24 Supermarine Seafire fighters, or 18 Barracudas and 34 Seafires. In RN service, the Barracuda was later replaced by the Fairey Firefly, and the Seafire was superseded by the Hawker Sea Fury during the Korean War. Early in their careers, Glory and Ocean were fitted out for night flying operations: these carriers were to embark a 32-strong air group; mixed between Fireflies and Grumman F6F Hellcats supplied by the United States as part of the Lend Lease program.

To launch and recover aircraft, the carriers were initially equipped with hydraulic catapults, arresting gear, and crash barriers. Aircraft were stored in a single hangar measuring 445 by 52 feet (136 by 16 m), with a height clearance of 17 feet 6 inches (5.33 m). This allowed the Light Fleets to later operate aircraft that the fleet carriers, which generally had two hangars with lower clearance in each, could not. The hangar was serviced by two aircraft lifts.

=== Armament ===
The Light Fleets were the first British aircraft carriers where the ship's air group was seen as the 'main armament'; any mounted weapons were to be for close-range anti-aircraft defence. The Colossus design called for six quadruple barrelled 2 pounder gun mounts, and 16 twin Oerlikon 20 mm cannons. Two 4-inch (102 mm) guns were originally included, but an increase in the design's flight deck length in March 1942 saw them displaced. The ships were unarmoured, as increasing the size of the vessels was deemed more important than protection.

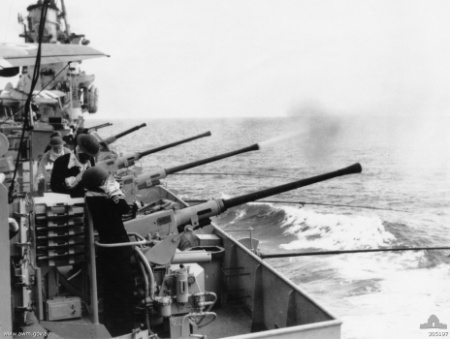
Some of Sydney's Bofors guns firing during gunnery practice in 1951

Lessons learned during the early part of the Pacific War showed the superiority of the Bofors 40 mm gun to other anti-aircraft weapons. By the end of the war, all Colossus-class ships had swapped all their other weapons for Bofors in single and twin mountings, and the Majestic design had been modified to carry 30 of the guns: 18 single mountings, and 6 twin mountings. The number of Bofors carried by the Light Fleets was reduced after the war, with British ships carrying only eight.

== Royal Navy service ==
=== Second World War and aftermath ===
Although four Colossus-class ships were completed before the end of the war, they did not see front-line action: the war in Europe had proceeded to the point where aircraft carriers were of limited use, and by the time the carriers reached the Pacific, Japan had surrendered. The four ships, assigned to the British Pacific Fleet, were instead used for the transportation of returning soldiers and rescued prisoners-of-war, to help alleviate the shortage of troopships and liners. As with the Colossus class, the maintenance carriers were completed but did not enter active service before the end of the war. They were reclassified as Ferry Carriers, and used to transport aircraft to British bases and ships across the world.

During the late 1940s and early 1950s, the carriers were used as testbeds for new aircraft and technology. Throughout late 1945, Ocean was used to test several new aircraft: the Hawker Sea Fury and de Havilland Sea Hornet piston-engine fighters during August, and the de Havilland Sea Vampire jet-propelled fighter-bomber in December. On 3 December 1945, a de Havilland Sea Vampire became the first jet aircraft to land on a carrier—two months before, Ocean's flight deck saw the last landing of a Fairey Swordfish torpedo bomber. The angled flight deck concept (which would later be installed on several of the Majestic-class carriers) was first trialled aboard Triumph: the straight-line deck markings were removed, and markings for an angled landing painted on. After a two-year loan to Canada, Warrior served as a testbed for rubberised flexible decks and skid-like landing gear during 1948 and 1949. During 1951 and 1952, Perseus was used as a trials ship for the under-development steam catapult.

=== Korean War ===
The Colossus class first saw combat during the Korean War. Following the invasion of South Korea by North Korea on 25 June, ships of the British Far East Fleet that were operating in Japanese waters, including the carrier Triumph, were placed under the United States Far East Commander, to operate in retaliation to the invasion under the instructions of the United Nations Security Council. The first carrier attack began on 3 July 1950, with aircraft from Triumph and United States carrier USS Valley Forge performing air strikes on North Korean airfields.

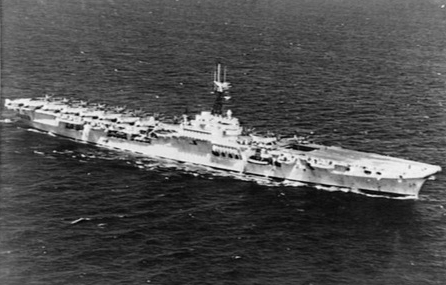
HMS Glory during her 1951 deployment to the Korean War

Between them, the Colossus-class carriers Triumph, Theseus, Glory, and Ocean, along with the Majestic-class HMAS Sydney, maintained a constant Anglo-Australian aircraft carrier presence for the duration of the Korean War. The Light Fleets were cheaper to operate than the armoured fleet carriers while providing a similar sized air group, but during the war proved to be slower, less comfortable, and more prone to wear-and-tear than other RN carriers. Financial and manpower restrictions meant that only one Light Fleet could be deployed to Korea at a time. Warrior also contributed to the Korean War effort by transporting replacement aircraft from the United Kingdom to British bases throughout the Far East region, which were then drawn upon by the active carriers.

Following the end of the Korean War, Warrior and Sydney returned to Korean waters on separate deployments, to ensure that the armistice was enforced and hostilities did not re-ignite.

=== Suez Crisis ===
Ocean and Theseus were part of the British response to the 1956 Suez Crisis. The two ships were not used as aircraft carriers; instead they were equipped with helicopters and tasked with transporting ashore 45 Commando, a battalion of the Royal Marines, in order to secure harbours and other landing points for heavy equipment. This, the first ship-based helicopter assault, was successful, and prompted the development of the amphibious assault ship.

=== Decommissioning and disposal ===
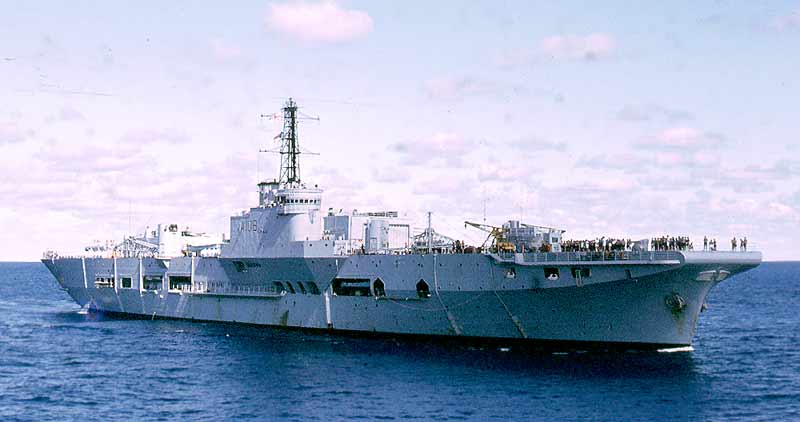
Triumph, following her conversion into a repair ship

The two maintenance carriers were decommissioned during the 1950s and scrapped: Pioneer was sold in 1954, and Perseus in 1958. With the exception of HMS Triumph, the Colossus-class carriers that remained in RN service were disposed of during the early 1960s. None was significantly modernised during its service life. Triumph left service in 1958, underwent a major conversion into a Heavy Repair Ship, and re-entered service in 1965.

== Foreign service ==
As Britain was unable to maintain the size of her wartime fleet after the end of the Second World War, several Colossus-class ships were placed into reserve, while work on the Majestic class was initially halted at the end of the war, then restored to a low-priority status. Demands for fiscal cutbacks, combined with the rapid obsolescence of the carriers by the development of jet aircraft, saw four of the eight Colossuses and all five completed Majestics sold off to other nations.

The majority of the Light Fleets in foreign service were modernised, either during construction or afterwards, to operate jet aircraft. This usually consisted of the installation of an angled flight deck, upgrading the aircraft catapult to be steam-powered, and installing an optical landing system: Australian Majestic-class carrier HMAS Melbourne was the third aircraft carrier in the world, after HMS Ark Royal and USS Forrestal, to be constructed with these features instead of having them added later.

=== Argentina ===
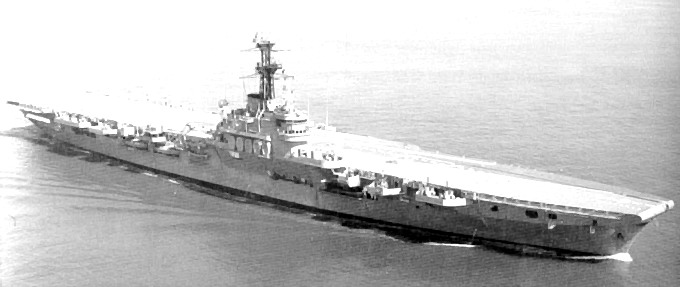
ARA Independencia in 1965

After a two-year loan to Canada, and a second period in Royal Navy commission, Warrior was sold to the Argentine Navy in 1958, and commissioned as ARA Independencia on 11 November. She was equipped with the Vought F4U Corsair, but proved unsuitable for Grumman F9F Panther jet fighters incorporated in 1963. Independencia served as the Argentine flagship until she was replaced by the Dutch Karel Doorman (formerly HMS Venerable), which was sold on to Argentina in 1969 and commissioned as ARA Veinticinco de Mayo. Independencia was struck from service in 1971 and broken up for scrap.

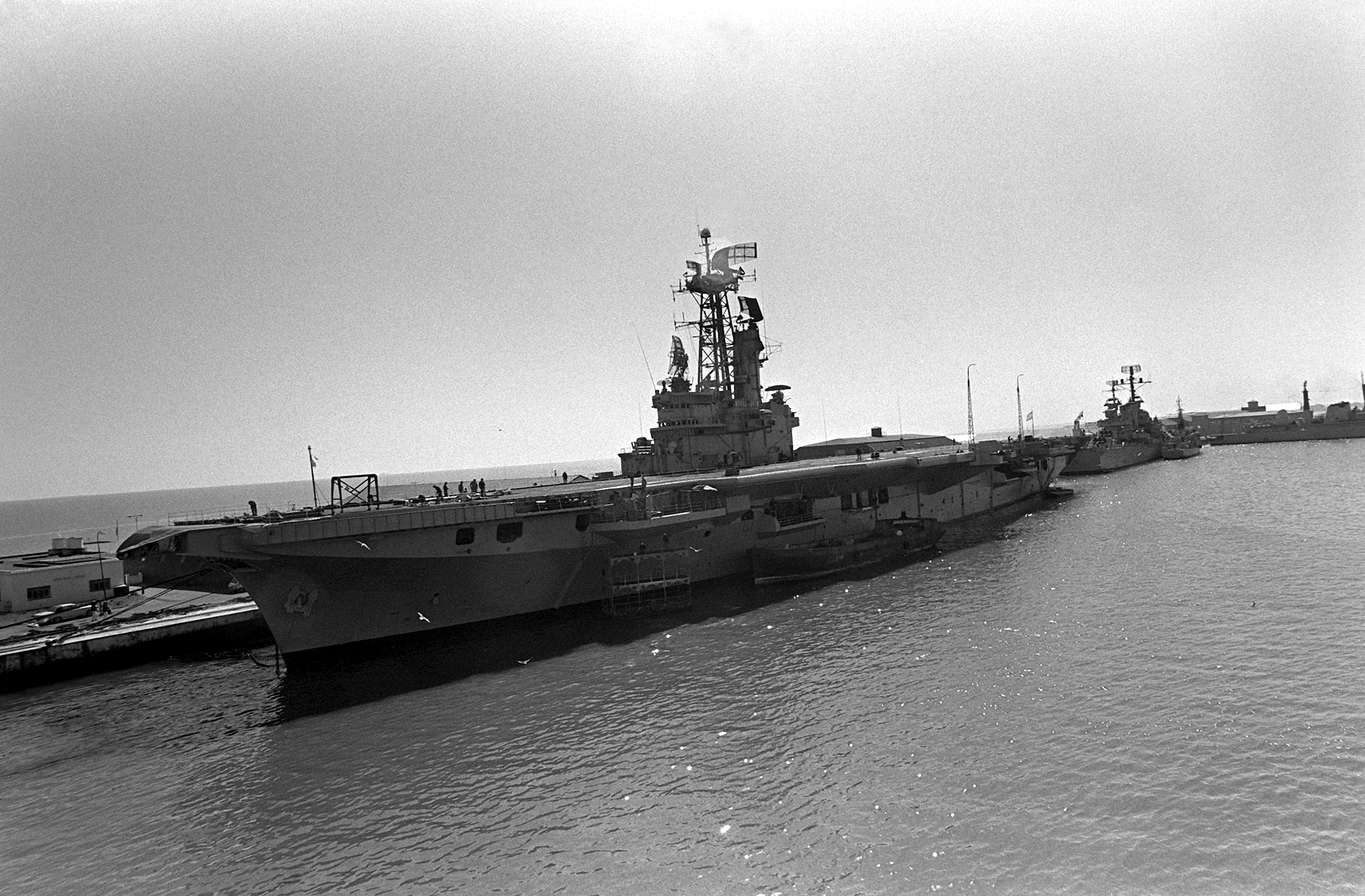
ARA Veinticinco de Mayo in 1979

Veinticinco de Mayo was initially equipped with F9F Panther and later with Douglas A-4 Skyhawk jet fighters; these were replaced with French Dassault Super Étendards in the 1980s. The carrier provided air cover for the Occupation of the Falkland Islands in April 1982. After hostilities broke out on 1 May 1982, it attempted an attack on the Royal Navy Task Force which did not take place, as poor winds prevented the heavily laden A-4Q jets from being launched. She remained confined to port for the rest of the Falklands War, particularly after the British submarine HMS Conqueror sank the Argentine cruiser ARA General Belgrano. Problems with her propulsion machinery meant that Veinticinco de Mayo was effectively inoperable from June 1986, although it was not until the start of 1999 that she was marked for scrapping.

=== Australia ===
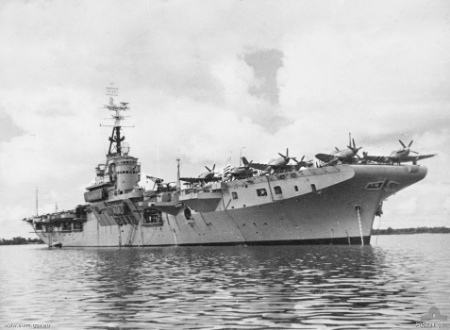
Sydney at anchor in Korean waters during 1951

In 1944, the Australian government suggested that Australian personnel be used to help counteract a personnel shortage in the Royal Navy by manning an aircraft carrier, one or more cruisers, and six destroyers. The Admiralty deemed a Colossus-class Light Fleet to be the most appropriate aircraft carrier, and Venerable was initially proposed for transfer to the Royal Australian Navy as a gift or on loan. The plan was deferred on the Australian end until a review of manpower requirements across the entire war effort was completed. The ship manning proposal was revisited in mid-1945, but the surrender of Germany in May meant that British shortages were not as problematic; as a counteroffer, the purchase of the Colossus-class Ocean by Australia was suggested. The Australian government decided against the purchase of Ocean in June.

Following the Second World War, a post-war review suggested that the Royal Australian Navy acquire three aircraft carriers as the core of a new fleet; funding restrictions saw the number of proposed carriers dropped to two. To this end, Australia acquired two Majestic-class ships: Terrible, which was commissioned in 1948 as HMAS Sydney; and Majestic, which was upgraded for jet operations and commissioned in 1955 as HMAS Melbourne. While waiting for Majestic/Melbourne to finish modernisation, the Colossus-class Vengeance was loaned to Australia from 1952 until 1955, allowing it to operate a two-carrier fleet.

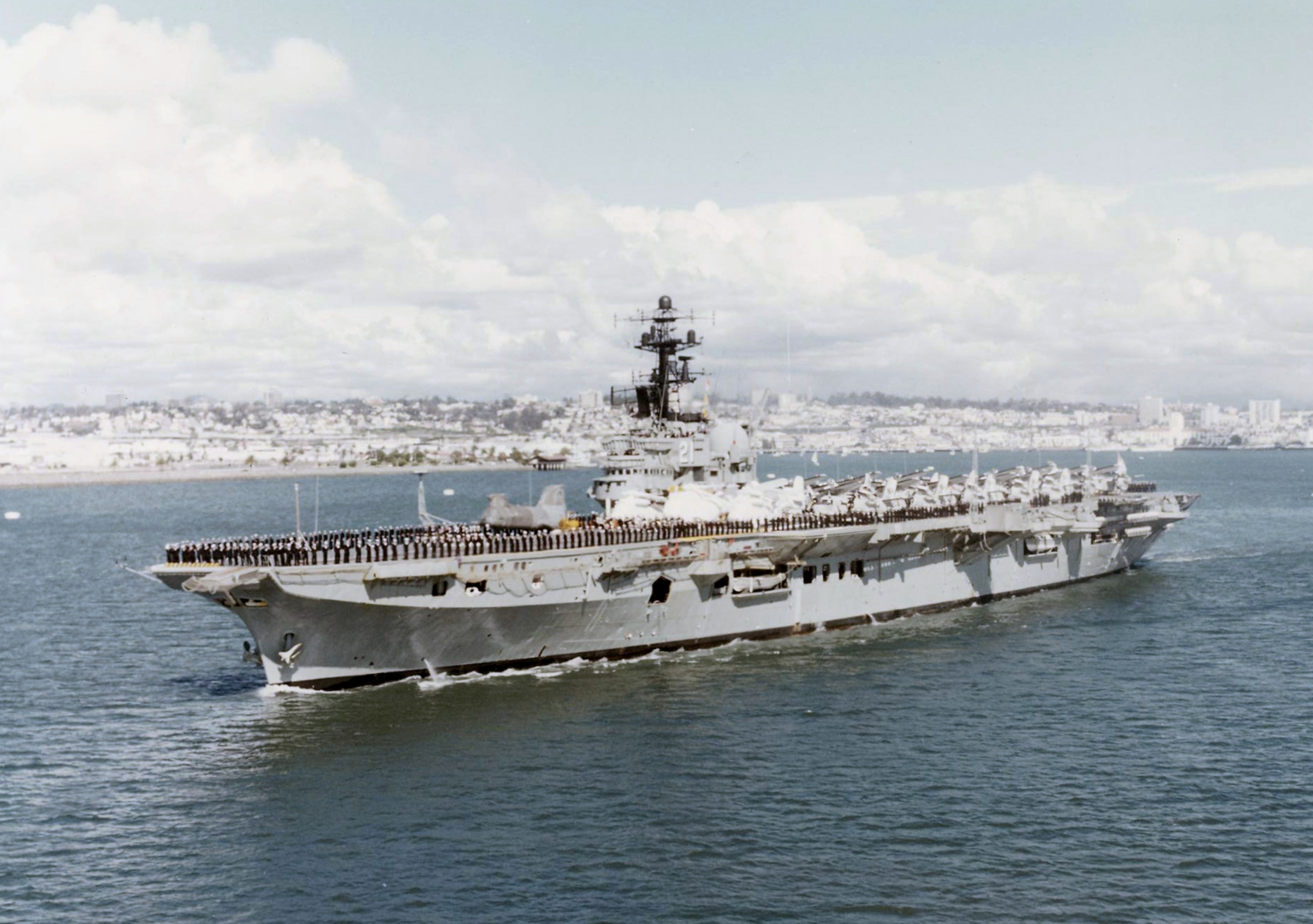
Melbourne enters San Diego in 1977

The first aircraft carrier acquired by the Royal Australian Navy, Sydney was deployed to Korea in order to maintain a consistent Commonwealth carrier presence in the conflict. Operating between September 1951 and January 1952, Sydney was the first carrier owned by a Commonwealth Dominion to see combat. Reclassified as a training ship in 1955, Sydney was decommissioned in 1958 but reactivated in 1962 as a fast troop transport. In her troopship role, Sydney travelled to Vietnam 25 times between 1965 and 1972. She was decommissioned in November 1973, and sold to a South Korean company for scrapping in 1975.

Although deployed to the Far East Strategic Reserve on several occasions, and assigned to escort Sydney to and from Vietnam on three occasions, Melbourne was not directly involved in any conflict during her career. However, she collided with and sank two plane guard destroyers—HMAS Voyager in 1964, and USS Frank E. Evans in 1969—which, along with several minor collisions and incidents, led to the reputation that the carrier was jinxed. Melbourne was sold to China for scrapping in 1985; instead of being broken up, she was studied as part of the nation's top-secret carrier development program, and may not have been dismantled until 2002. There were plans to replace Melbourne with the British carrier HMS Invincible, but Invincible was withdrawn from sale following her service in the Falklands War, and a 1983 election promise to not replace the carrier saw the end of Australian carrier-based fixed-wing aviation.

=== Brazil ===
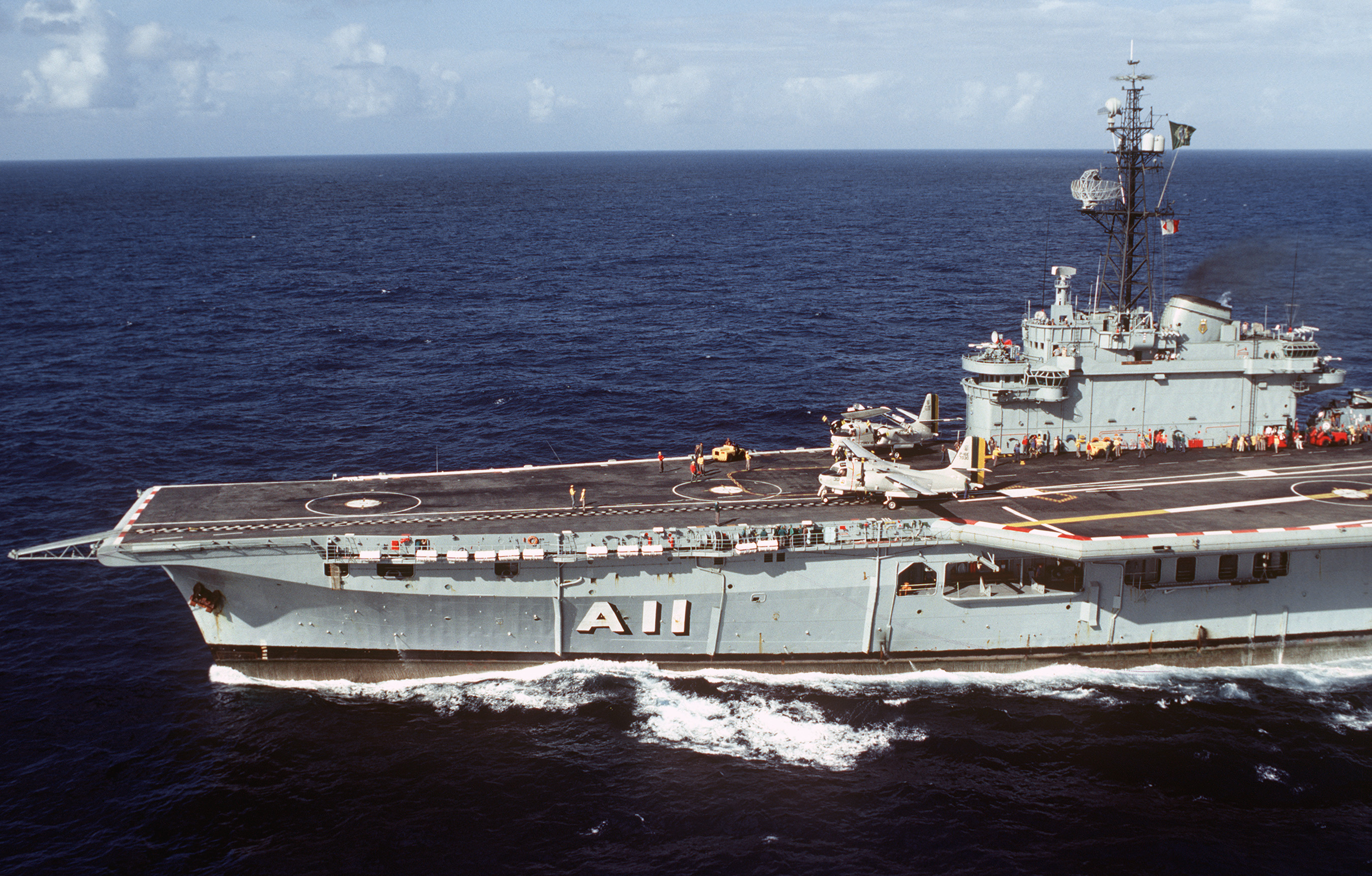
Minas Gerais about to launch an S-2 Tracker

After Vengeance was returned from her loan to Australia, she was sold to the Brazilian Navy on 14 December 1956. From mid-1957 until December 1960, the carrier underwent a massive refit and reconstruction at Verolme Dock in Rotterdam; the work performed included the installation of an 8.5-degree angled flight deck and a steam catapult, strengthening of arresting gear, and reinforcing of the hangar lifts. The carrier was commissioned into the Marinha do Brasil (MB, Brazilian Navy) as Minas Gerais on 6 December 1960.

The Brazilian carrier was equipped with Grumman S-2E Tracker fixed-wing aircraft, and Sikorsky ASH-3D Sea King, AS-355 Ecureuil, and AS332 Super Puma helicopters. Brazilian law prevented the MB from operating fixed-wing aircraft, so two separate air groups had to be embarked. In 1999, the MB acquired Douglas A-4KU Skyhawks—the first time Brazilian naval aviators were permitted to operate fixed-wing aircraft until the carrier's 2001 decommissioning. Minas Gerais was replaced by NAe São Paulo (the former French carrier Foch).

Minas Gerais was the last of the Second World War-era light aircraft carriers to leave service, and at the time of her decommissioning was the oldest active aircraft carrier in the world. The carrier was marked for sale in 2002, and was actively sought after by British naval associations for return to England and preservation as a museum ship, although they were unable to raise the required money. In December 2003 the carrier was listed for sale on auction website eBay, but was removed because the site's rules prevented the sale of military ordnance. Sometime between February and July 2004, the carrier was towed to the ship breaking yards at Alang, India, for dismantling.

=== Canada ===
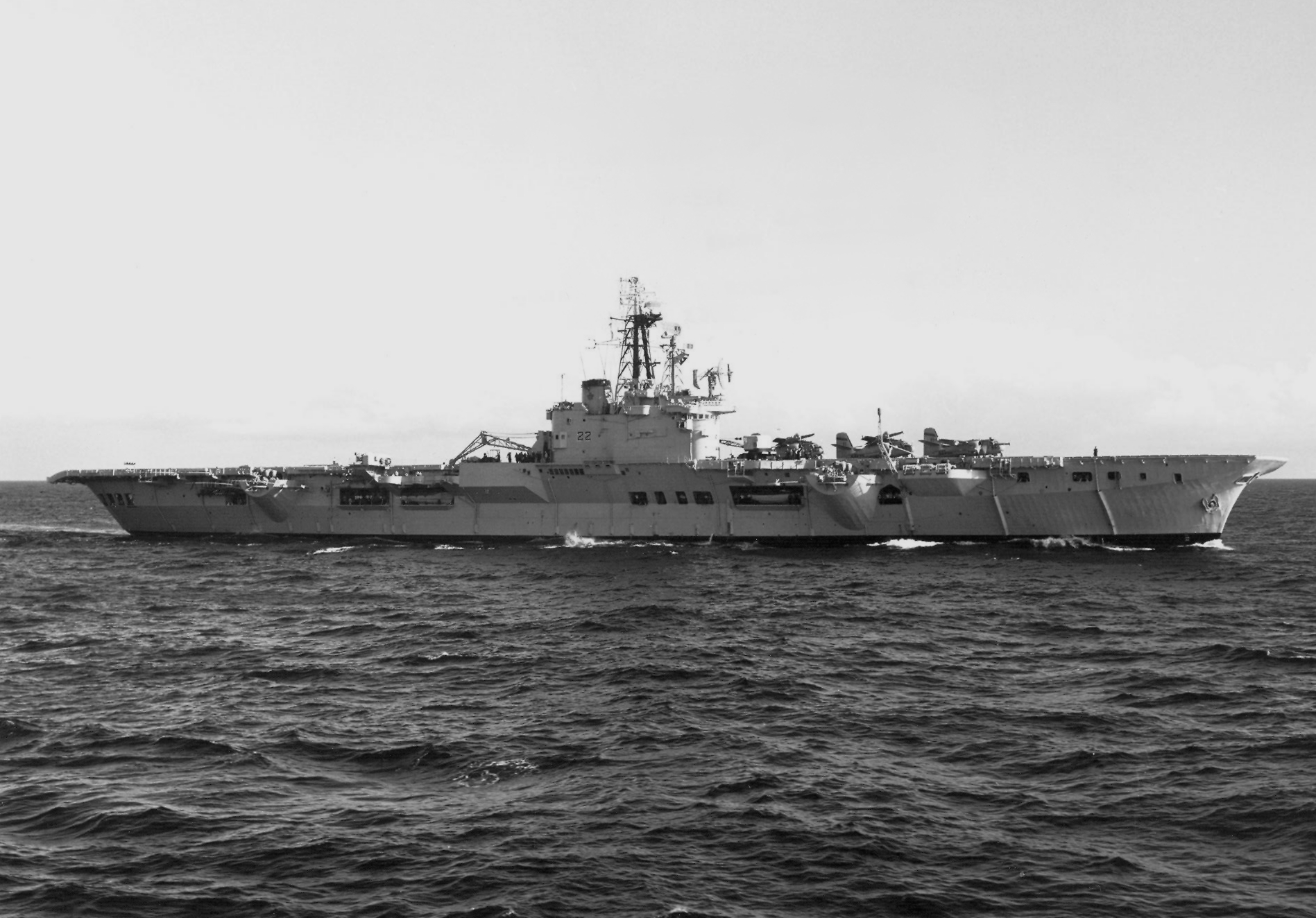
Bonaventure underway in 1961

Following wartime experience showing the effectiveness of naval aviation, the Royal Canadian Navy decided to acquire an aircraft carrier. The Canadian government decided to purchase the Majestic-class carrier Powerful, and have her upgraded to modern standards. The Colossus-class Warrior was transferred on a two-year loan from 1946 to 1948, so the experience gained by providing ship's companies for two British escort carriers during the war could be maintained. The upgrading of Powerful took longer than expected, and as Warrior had to be returned by 1948, Magnificent was completed to the basic Majestic design and loaned to the Royal Canadian Navy in 1948 as HMCS Magnificent. On her return to Britain, Warrior was used as a trials ship, then modernised before her sale to Argentina. The loan of Magnificent continued until the completion of Powerful in 1957, at which point Magnificent was returned to the British. She was to be sold to another nation, but after no buyers came forward, the carrier was scrapped.

In the meantime, Powerful had been upgraded to operate jet aircraft. The modifications included an 8° angled flight deck and steam catapult, and she was equipped with American weapons, radars, and jet aircraft instead of their British equivalents. She was commissioned in 1957 as HMCS Bonaventure. The carrier's design could not keep up with the advances in naval aircraft during the early 1960s, and in 1962, the ship's McDonnell F2H Banshee fighters were retired, leaving an anti-submarine warfare (ASW) focused air group of Sikorsky CH-124 Sea King helicopters and Grumman S-2 Tracker ASW aircraft. Bonaventure received a major mid life refit in 1967, but was withdrawn in 1970 after defence cuts. Her departure marked the end of Canadian carrier-based aviation.

=== France ===
Lead ship Colossus was loaned to the French Navy in August 1946 and renamed Arromanches. The vessel remained in French service, and was purchased outright in 1951. She was deployed to French Indochina, and operated during the First Indochina War from 1949 to 1954. After the war's end, the carrier was assigned to the Mediterranean. She participated in the 1956 Suez Crisis, operating air strikes against Egyptian positions around Port Said. A modernisation from 1957 to 1958 saw the installation of a 4° angled flight deck and an optical landing system, allowing Arromanches to operate Breguet Alizé anti-submarine aircraft.

Arromanches was replaced in active service by the French-built Clemenceau class, and was converted into a training ship in 1960. Apart from a short stint as an anti-submarine carrier in 1968, the ship remained in this role until her 1974 decommissioning. Arromanches was broken up for scrap in 1978.

=== India ===
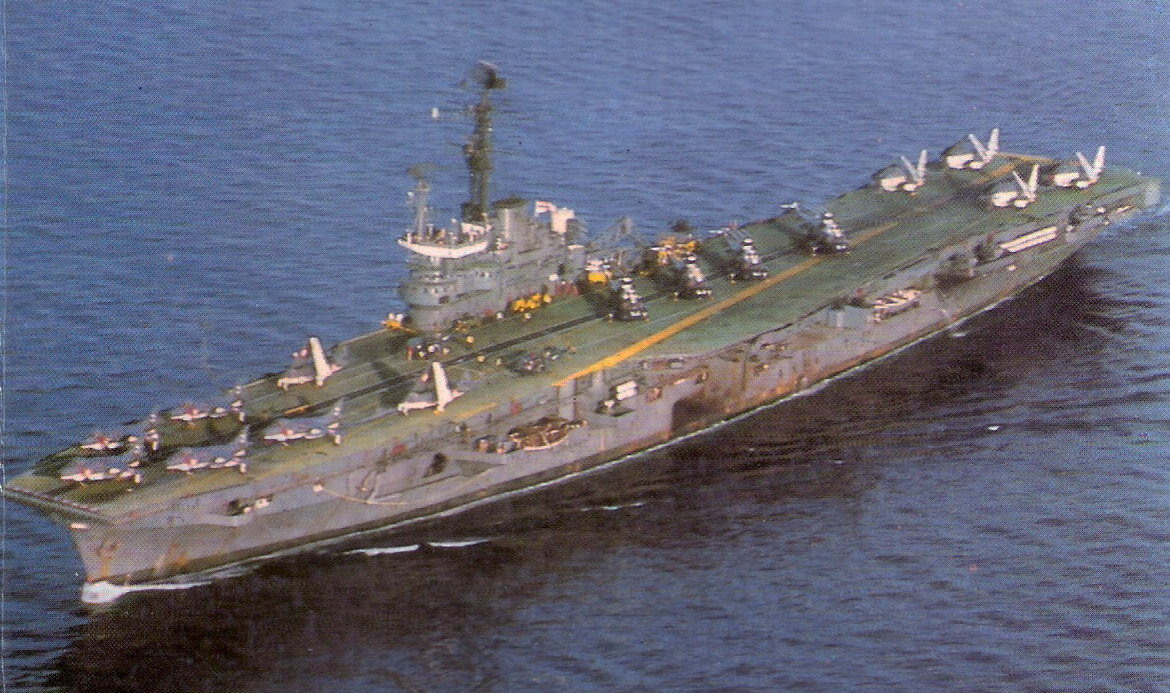
Vikrant underway in 1984, with a mix of fixed-wing aircraft and helicopters on the flight deck

Work on the Majestic-class Hercules was suspended in May 1946, with the ship about 75% complete. The carrier remained in an unfinished condition until January 1957, when she was purchased by the Indian Navy. Fitted with an angled flight deck, Hercules was commissioned into the Indian Navy as INS Vikrant in 1961. Vikrant was not involved in the 1962 Sino-Indian War or the 1965 Indo-Pakistani War because she was docked for maintenance and refits on both occasions. She did operate during the 1971 Indo-Pakistani War, with her air group performing strike and interdiction operations in East Pakistan.

A major upgrade between 1979 and 1982 saw the carrier fitted with a new propulsion system, an updated radar suite, and a 9.75° ski-jump ramp to be used by Sea Harriers. The carrier was last deployed in 1994, and she was decommissioned in 1997. Vikrant helped the Indian Navy to become the dominant regional power.

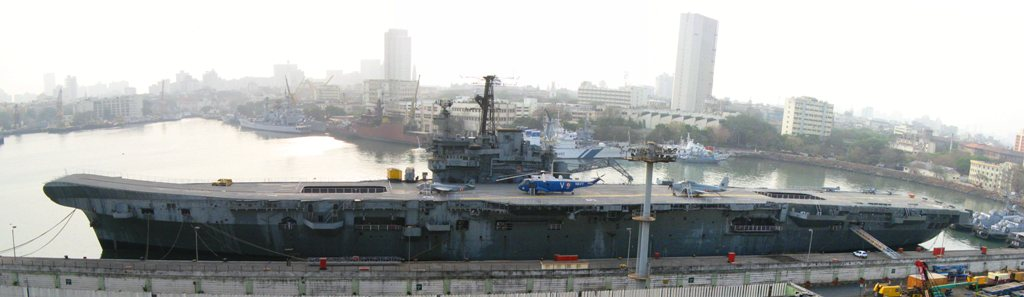
The Indian aircraft carrier INS Vikrant in 2008

Following her decommissioning, Vikrant was marked for preservation as a museum ship. Vikrant was opened to the public by the Indian Navy for short periods, but the inability to find an operating partner, lack of funds, and the deterioration of the ship led to the closure of the museum in 2012, and the sale of the vessel for ship breaking in early 2014.

=== Netherlands ===
The Royal Netherlands Navy acquired the Colossus-class Venerable in 1948, and commissioned her as HNLMS Karel Doorman. Initially, the carrier operated piston-engined aircraft, but underwent modernisation from 1955 to 1958, including a steam catapult, reinforced flight deck and aircraft lifts, and an 8° angled deck. Between the upgrade and 1964, Karel Doorman possessed a mixed air group of jet fighters, anti-submarine aircraft, and helicopters; the fixed-wing aircraft were removed in that year.

Between 10 March 1966 and 17 April 1967 Karel Doorman was overhauled at the shipyard of Verolme in Rozenburg. During this overhaul her boiler system was replaced with that of the mothballed HMS Leviathan. The cost of replacing the boiler system were estimated at the time to be around 2 million Dutch guilders.

In 1968, Karel Doorman was heavily damaged by fire. She was repaired with equipment stripped from other Light Fleet carriers in reserve and awaiting disposal. However, before the fire, the Royal Netherlands Navy was reconsidering carrier-based operation, and instead of returning her to service, Karel Doorman was sold to Argentina.

== Ships ==
List of Colossus-class ships
Name	Builder	Laid down	Launched	Commissioned	Paid off	Foreign service and notes	Fate
Colossus	Vickers-Armstrong	1 June 1942	30 September 1943	16 December 1944	1946	French Navy: Arromanches (1946–1974)	Scrapped in France 1978
Glory	Harland & Wolff	27 August 1942	27 November 1943	2 April 1945	1956		Scrapped in Scotland 1961
Ocean	Stephen & Sons	8 November 1942	8 July 1943	8 August 1945	1960		Scrapped in Scotland 1962
Venerable	Cammell Laird	3 December 1942	30 December 1943	17 January 1945	April 1947	Royal Netherlands Navy: HNLMS Karel Doorman (1948–1968)	Scrapped in India 1999
Venerable	Cammell Laird	3 December 1942	30 December 1943	17 January 1945	April 1947	Argentine Navy: ARA Veinticinco de Mayo (1969–1999)	Scrapped in India 1999
Vengeance	Swan Hunter	16 November 1942	23 February 1944	15 January 1945	1952	Royal Australian Navy HMAS Vengeance (1952–1955)	Scrapped in India 2004
Vengeance	Swan Hunter	16 November 1942	23 February 1944	15 January 1945	1952	Brazilian Navy: Minas Gerais (1960–2001)	Scrapped in India 2004
Pioneer	Vickers-Armstrong	2 December 1942	20 May 1944	8 February 1945	1954	Completed as maintenance carrier	Scrapped in Scotland 1954
Warrior	Harland & Wolff Ltd.	12 December 1942	20 May 1944	2 April 1945	1946	Royal Canadian Navy HMCS Warrior (1946–1948)	Scrapped in Argentina 1971
Warrior	Harland & Wolff Ltd.	12 December 1942	20 May 1944	2 April 1945	1946	Returned to Royal Navy (1948–1958)	Scrapped in Argentina 1971
Warrior	Harland & Wolff Ltd.	12 December 1942	20 May 1944	2 April 1945	1946	Argentine Navy: ARA Independencia (1958–1971)	Scrapped in Argentina 1971
Theseus	Fairfield Shipbuilding and Engineering Company	6 January 1943	6 July 1944	9 February 1946	1957		Scrapped in Scotland 1962
Triumph	R. & W. Hawthorn Leslie & Company Limited	27 January 1943	2 October 1944	9 May 1946	1975	Reclassified as repair ship in 1965	Scrapped in Spain 1981
Perseus	Vickers-Armstrong	1 June 1943	26 March 1944	19 October 1945	1957	Completed as maintenance carrier	Scrapped in Scotland 1958

List of Majestic-class ships
Name	Builder	Laid down	Launched	Commissioned	Paid off	Foreign service and notes	Fate
Majestic	Vickers-Armstrong	15 April 1943	28 February 1945	28 October 1955	30 May 1982	Royal Australian Navy as Melbourne	Scrapped in China 1985
Terrible	HM Dockyard Devonport	19 April 1943	30 September 1944	16 December 1948	12 November 1973	Royal Australian Navy as Sydney	Scrapped in South Korea 1975
Magnificent	Harland & Wolff	29 July 1943	16 November 1944	21 March 1948	1956	Royal Canadian Navy as Magnificent	Scrapped in Scotland 1965
Hercules	Vickers-Armstrong (construction); Harland & Wolff (fitting out)	14 October 1943	22 September 1945	4 April 1961	31 January 1997	Indian Navy as Vikrant	Scrapped in India 2014–2015
Leviathan	Swan, Hunter & Wigham Richardson, Limited	18 October 1943	7 June 1945	—N/a	—N/a	Scrapped before completion	Scrapped in Scotland 1968
Powerful	Harland & Wolff	27 November 1943	27 February 1945	17 January 1957	3 July 1970	Royal Canadian Navy as Bonaventure	Scrapped in Taiwan 1971

== See also ==
- List of ship classes of World War II

== Bibliography ==
Books

- Bastock, John (1975). Australia's Ships of War. Cremorne, NSW: Angus and Robertson. ISBN 0-207-12927-4. OCLC 2525523.
- Bishop, Chris; Chant, Christopher (2004). Aircraft carriers: the world's greatest naval vessels and their aircraft. Grand Rapids, MI: Zenith. ISBN 0-7603-2005-5. OCLC 56646560.
- Blackman, Raymond, ed. (1968). Jane's Fighting Ships, 1968–69 (71st ed.). London: Jane's Publishing Company. OCLC 123786869.
- Donohue, Hector (October 1996). From Empire Defence to the Long Haul: post-war defence policy and its impact on naval force structure planning 1945–1955. Papers in Australian Maritime Affairs (No. 1). Canberra: Sea Power Centre. ISBN 0-642-25907-0. ISSN 1327-5658. OCLC 36817771.
- Fontenoy, Paul E. (2006). Aircraft carriers: an illustrated history of their impact. Weapons and Warfare. ABC-CILO. ISBN 1-85109-573-X.
- Hall, Timothy (1982). HMAS Melbourne. North Sydney, NSW: George Allen & Unwin. ISBN 0-86861-284-7. OCLC 9753221.
- Harding, Richard (2005). The Royal Navy 1930–2000: innovation and defence. Routledge. ISBN 0-7146-5710-7.
- Hobbs, David (1996). Aircraft Carriers of the British and Commonwealth Navies. London: Greenhill Books. ISBN 1-85367-252-1.
- Hobbs, David (2005). "HMAS Sydney (III): a symbol of Australia's growing maritime capability". In Stevens, David; Reeve, John (eds.). The Navy and the Nation: the influence of the Navy on modern Australia. Crows Nest, NSW: Allen & Unwin. ISBN 1-74114-200-8. OCLC 67872922.
- Ireland, Bernard (2008) [2005]. The Illustrated Guide to Aircraft Carriers of the World. London: Anness Publishing. ISBN 978-1-84477-747-1. OCLC 156616762.
- Konstam, Angus (2010). British Aircraft Carriers 1939–45. New Vanguard No. 168. illustrated by Tony Bryan. Oxford: Osprey Publishing. ISBN 978-1-84908-079-8.
- McCaffrie, Jack (2007). "Korea: The first challenge for Australian naval aviation". In Stevens, David; Reeve, John (eds.). Sea Power ashore and in the air. Ultimo, NSW: Halstead Press. ISBN 978-1-920831-45-5. OCLC 271328006.
- Polmar, Norman (2001) [1993]. The Naval Institute Guide to the Ships and Aircraft of the U.S. Fleet (17th ed.). Annapolis, Md: Naval Institute Press. ISBN 1-55750-656-6. OCLC 249124965.
- Preston, Antony (2000). Aircraft Carriers. Sydney, NSW: AP Publishing. ISBN 0-86827-042-3.
- Robbins, Guy (2001). The Aircraft Carrier Story: 1908–1945. London: Cassel & Co. ISBN 0-304-35308-6. OCLC 45306859 – via Internet Archive.
- Snowie, J. Allan (1987). The Bonnie: HMCS Bonaventure. Erin, ON: The Boston Mills Press. ISBN 0-919783-40-6.
- Wragg, David (2009). A Century of Maritime Aviation: 1909–2009. South Yorkshire: Pen & Sword Maritime. ISBN 978-1-84884-036-2.
- Wright, Anthony (June 1998) [1978]. Australian Carrier Decisions: the acquisition of HMA Ships Albatross, Sydney and Melbourne. Papers in Australian Maritime Affairs. Vol. 4. Canberra: Sea Power Centre. ISBN 0-642-29503-4. ISSN 1327-5658. OCLC 39641731.

Journal articles

- Corless, Josh (1 June 1999). "The Brazilian Navy blazes a trail in the South Atlantic". Jane's Navy International. 104 (6). Jane's Information Group.
- English, Adrian J. (1 May 1996). "Latin American Navies still treading water". Jane's Navy International. 101 (3). Jane's Information Group.
- Hobbs, David (Winter 2004). "British Commonwealth Carrier Operations in the Korean War". Air & Space Power Journal. 18 (4): 62–71. ISSN 1555-385X.
- Hobbs, David (October 2007). "HMAS Melbourne (II) – 25 Years On". The Navy. 69 (4): 5–9. ISSN 1322-6231.
- Storey, Ian; Ji, You (Winter 2004). "China's aircraft carrier ambitions: seeking truth from rumours". Naval War College Review. 57 (1): 77–93. ISSN 0028-1484. Archived from the original on 1 April 2008.

Newspaper articles

- Parry, Simon (25 July 2004). "Sad end to symbol of city's liberation". Sunday Morning Post.
- Syal, Rajeev; Lashmar, Paul (16 June 2002). "Race to save historic ship from scrap heap". The Daily Telegraph. London.
- Tembhekar, Chittaranjan (14 April 2010). "No takers for INS Vikrant's museum plan". The Times of India. Archived from the original on 11 August 2011.
- Tweedie, Neil (10 January 2004). "For internet sale: aircraft carrier, only three owners". The Daily Telegraph. London. Archived from the original on 28 September 2008.
