= ARA Veinticinco de Mayo (V-2) =

Colossus-class aircraft carrier

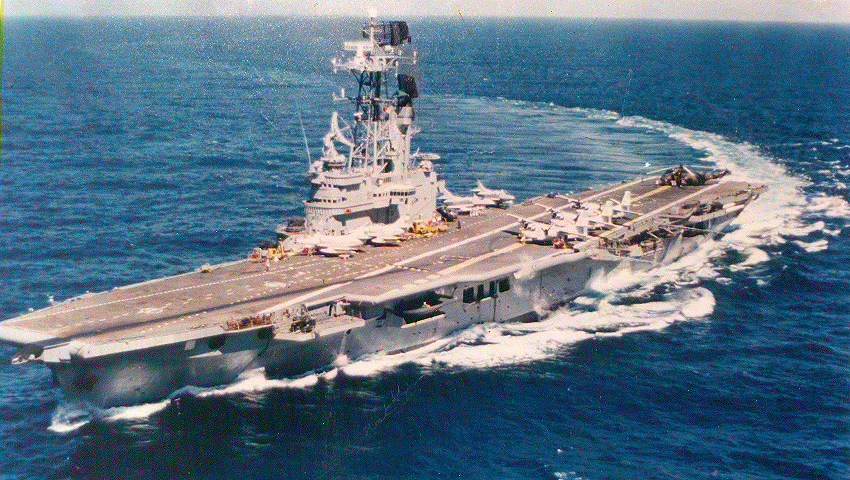
- Veinticinco de Mayo

History

United Kingdom
- Name: Venerable
- Ordered: 7 August 1942
- Builder: Cammell Laird
- Yard number: 1126
- Laid down: 3 December 1942
- Launched: 30 December 1943
- Commissioned: 27 November 1944
- Decommissioned: April 1947
- Identification: Pennant number: R63
- Fate: Sold to the Netherlands, 1 April 1948

Netherlands
- Name: Karel Doorman
- Namesake: Karel Doorman
- Acquired: 1 April 1948
- Commissioned: 28 May 1948
- Decommissioned: 29 April 1968
- Refit: 1955–1958; 1965–1966
- Identification: Pennant number: R81
- Fate: Sold to Argentina, 15 October 1968

Argentina
- Name: Veinticinco de Mayo
- Namesake: 25 May, date of the May Revolution
- Acquired: 15 October 1968
- Commissioned: 12 March 1969
- Decommissioned: 1997
- Out of service: Inoperable by 1990
- Refit: 1969
- Home port: Puerto Belgrano
- Fate: Provided spare parts for Brazilian aircraft carrier Minas Gerais and remainder was scrapped in Alang, India in 2000

General characteristics
- Class & type: Colossus-class aircraft carrier
- Displacement: 19,900 tons
- Length: 211 m (692 ft 3 in)
- Beam: 24.4 m (80 ft 1 in)
- Draught: 7.5 m (24 ft 7 in)
- Propulsion: 4 boilers with steam turbines; 2 shafts; 40,000 shp (30,000 kW)
- Speed: 24 knots (44 km/h)
- Complement: 1,300
- Armament: 12 × 40 mm AA guns
- Aircraft carried: 21

ARA Veinticinco de Mayo (V-2) was a Colossus-class light aircraft carrier in the Argentine Navy from 1969 to 1997. The English translation of the name is Twenty-fifth of May, which is the date of Argentina's May Revolution in 1810.

The ship previously served in the Royal Navy as HMS Venerable and the Royal Netherlands Navy as HNLMS Karel Doorman. She was deployed south during the Beagle Crisis in 1978 and in the first weeks of the Falklands War (Spanish: Guerra de las Malvinas), where her aircraft were deployed against the Royal Navy task force, but spent the bulk of the war in port.

== History ==
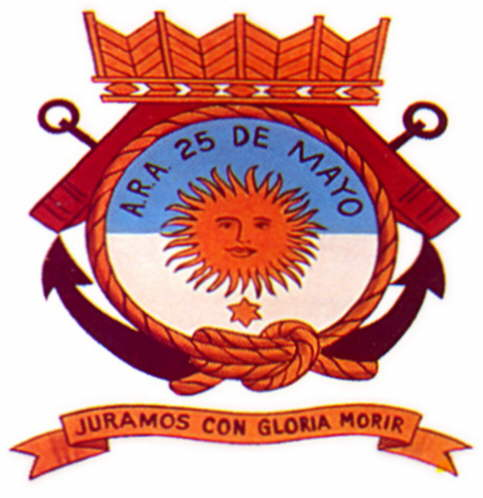
ARA Veinticinco de Mayo badge with the motto "Juramos con gloria morir" which means "We swear to die gloriously", a reference to the Argentine National Anthem.

The ship was built for the Royal Navy by Cammell Laird in Birkenhead, England during the Second World War. As a Colossus-class aircraft carrier, she was named HMS Venerable and saw service in the British Pacific Fleet. Venerable only served three years in the Royal Navy before being sold to the Netherlands as HNLMS Karel Doorman.

After a boiler room fire, the carrier was rebuilt at Wilton-Fijenoord, sold to Argentina, and renamed Veinticinco de Mayo. The Argentine Navy already operated a carrier, ARA Independencia This ship was also a former Royal Navy Colossus class; however, Independencia's catapult was not powerful enough to launch jet aircraft, while Veinticinco de Mayo had had a much more powerful catapult fitted during the Dutch rebuild. Independencia was decommissioned in 1970, leaving Veinticinco de Mayo as the sole remaining carrier in the Argentine fleet. She could carry up to 24 aircraft.

The air group started with F9F Panthers and F9F Cougar jets and later these were replaced with A-4Q Skyhawks supported by S-2 Tracker anti-submarine warfare aircraft and Sikorsky Sea King helicopters.

In September 1969, during the voyage of the recently bought Veinticinco de Mayo from the Netherlands, Hawker Siddeley demonstrated their Harrier GR.1 on board the carrier for a possible sale to the Argentine Navy.

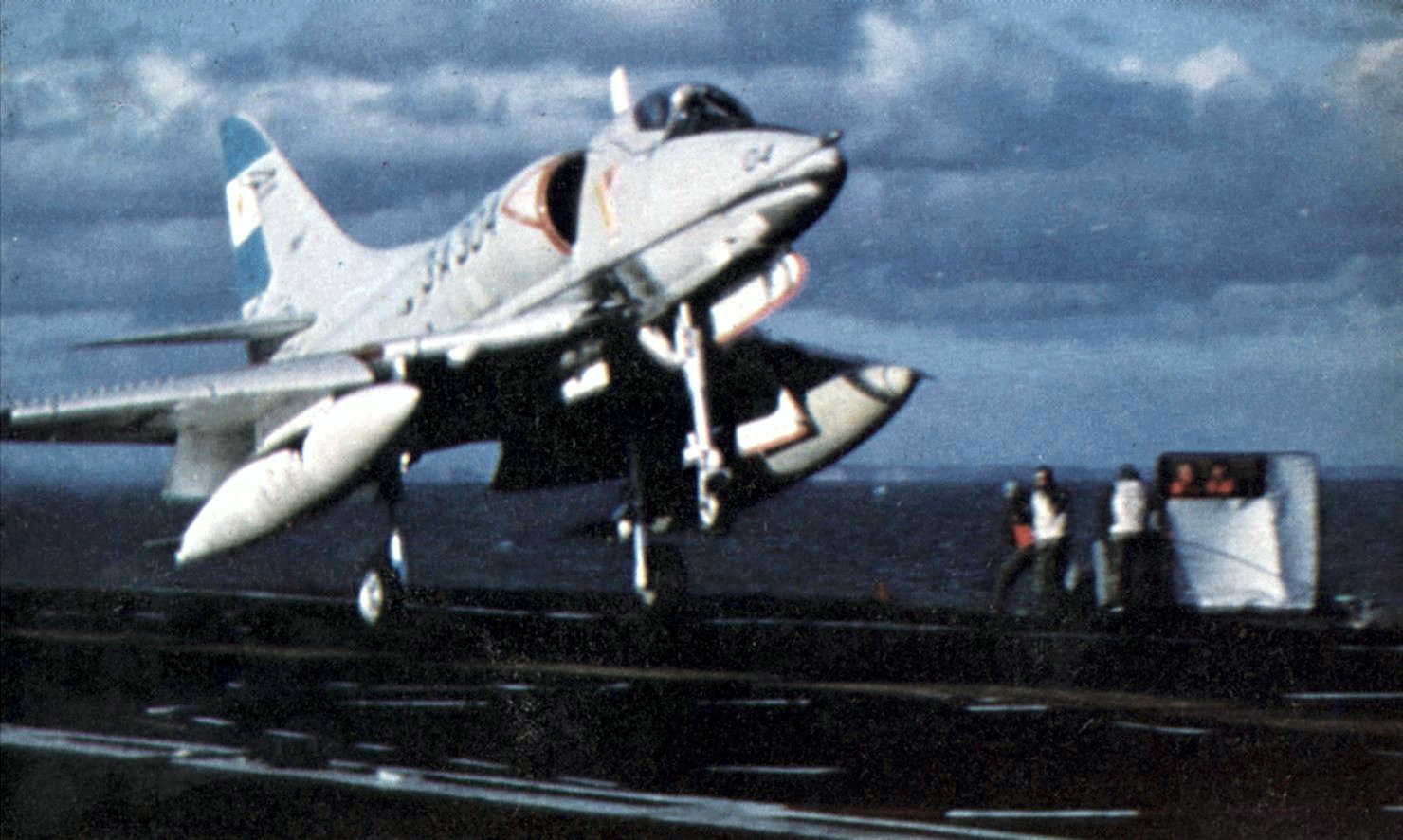
A-4Q landing on Veinticinco de Mayo, circa 1982

During the 1970s the ship was refitted and updated several times, though in each case the duration of each repair period was never more than 3–5 months, allowing her to be available to deploy. Her last pre-Falklands refit occurred during 1981, when she received an update to her radar, arresting gear, steam catapult and (most noticeably) the forward edge of the port side angled deck was filled out via an enlarged sponson. These improvements would theoretically enable her to operate the Super Etendard strike aircraft purchased from France, but it was discovered during testing that the catapult had difficulties launching the aircraft type. As a result, her strike airwing was limited to the A-4Q Skyhawks.

=== Beagle Conflict ===
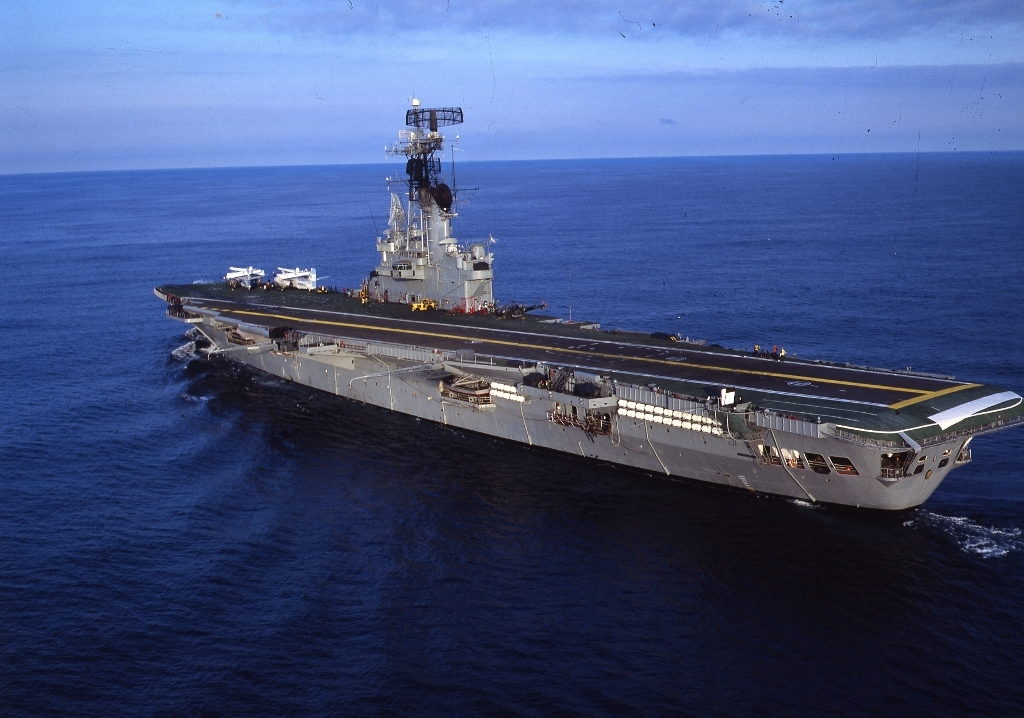
Veinticinco de Mayo, between 1978 and 1980

During Operation Soberanía, Veinticinco de Mayo was planned to support the invasion of the Picton, Nueva and Lennox islands.

=== Falklands War ===
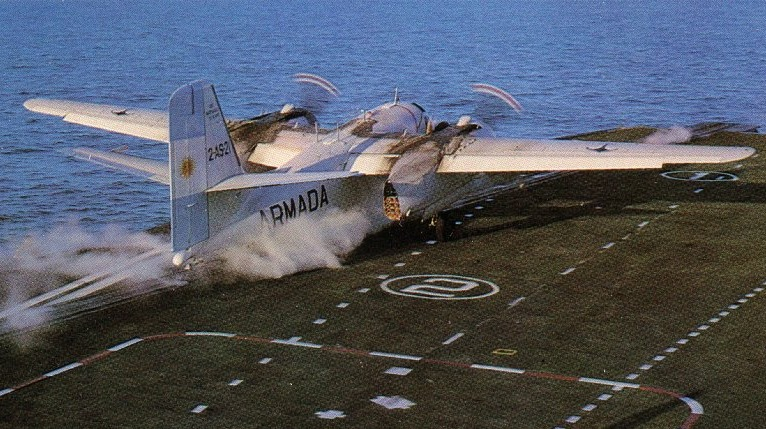
S-2G Tracker taking off from Veinticinco de Mayo

During the Falklands War, Veinticinco de Mayo was used in support of the initial Argentine landings on the Falklands. On the day of the invasion, she waited with 1500 army soldiers outside Stanley harbour as the first submarine and boat-landed commandos secured landing areas and then Argentine marines made the main amphibious landing. Her aircraft were not used during the invasion. Later, in defence of the occupation, she was deployed in a task force north of the Falkland Islands, with the cruiser ARA General Belgrano to the south. The British had assigned HMS Splendid (S106), a nuclear-powered submarine, to track down Veinticinco de Mayo and sink her if necessary. Rear Admiral Sandy Woodward, commanding the British task force from HMS Hermes stated in his book One Hundred Days that, had Splendid located the carrier, he would have "Recommended in the strongest possible terms to the Commander-in-Chief Admiral Sir John Fieldhouse that we take them both out this night".

Following the outbreak of hostilities on 1 May 1982, the Argentine carrier planned an attack on the Royal Navy Task Force. Veinticinco de Mayo's S-2 Trackers detected the British fleet late that day, and a strike by all eight A-4Q Skyhawk jets was prepared, scheduled to take-off at dawn. The attack did not take place, because subsequent Tracker sorties had failed to relocate the British fleet. After the British nuclear-powered submarine HMS Conqueror sank General Belgrano, Veinticinco de Mayo returned to port. The naval A-4Q Skyhawks flew the rest of the war from the airbase in Río Grande, Tierra del Fuego.

=== Disposal ===
In 1983, Veinticinco de Mayo was modified to carry the Super Étendard, and her British-built CAAIS combat data system was replaced by a Dutch SEWACO system, which was compatible with the Argentine Navy's new Almirante Brown-class destroyers. From 1986, problems in her engines largely confined her to port; rendering her unserviceable.

Work began in 1988 to refit the carrier, with it being planned to replace her steam turbines with gas turbines, while providing an auxiliary steam plant to power the ship's steam catapults. By 1994, the ship's machinery had been removed, but a shortage of funds led to work stopping. In December 1996, the Argentine Navy announced that Veinticinco de Mayo would be discarded. By this time, she had already been stripped of various major pieces of equipment, which were used as spares for the Brazilian carrier Minas Gerais, another Colossus-class ship which had been heavily modified in the Netherlands. Finally, in 2000, she was towed to Alang, India for scrapping.

Although Minas Gerais was offered to the Argentine Navy in 2000 as a replacement, she was rejected due to her poor condition and high restoration and maintenance costs. As of the 2020s, the Argentine Naval Aviation has lost the use of carrier-capable fixed-wing aircraft. While five refurbished Super Étendard aircraft were delivered to the Navy from France in 2019, these aircraft were missing key spare parts and therefore remained unserviceable. In 2021, it was reported that the return of these aircraft to an operational configuration was also encountering problems as the ejector seats of the aircraft were the MK6, manufactured by British firm Martin-Baker.

== See also ==
- List of aircraft carriers
- List of ships of the Argentine Navy
- Veinticinco de Mayo cruiser
