= Brazilian aircraft carrier Minas Gerais =

1960–2001 Colossus-class aircraft carrier of the Brazilian Navy

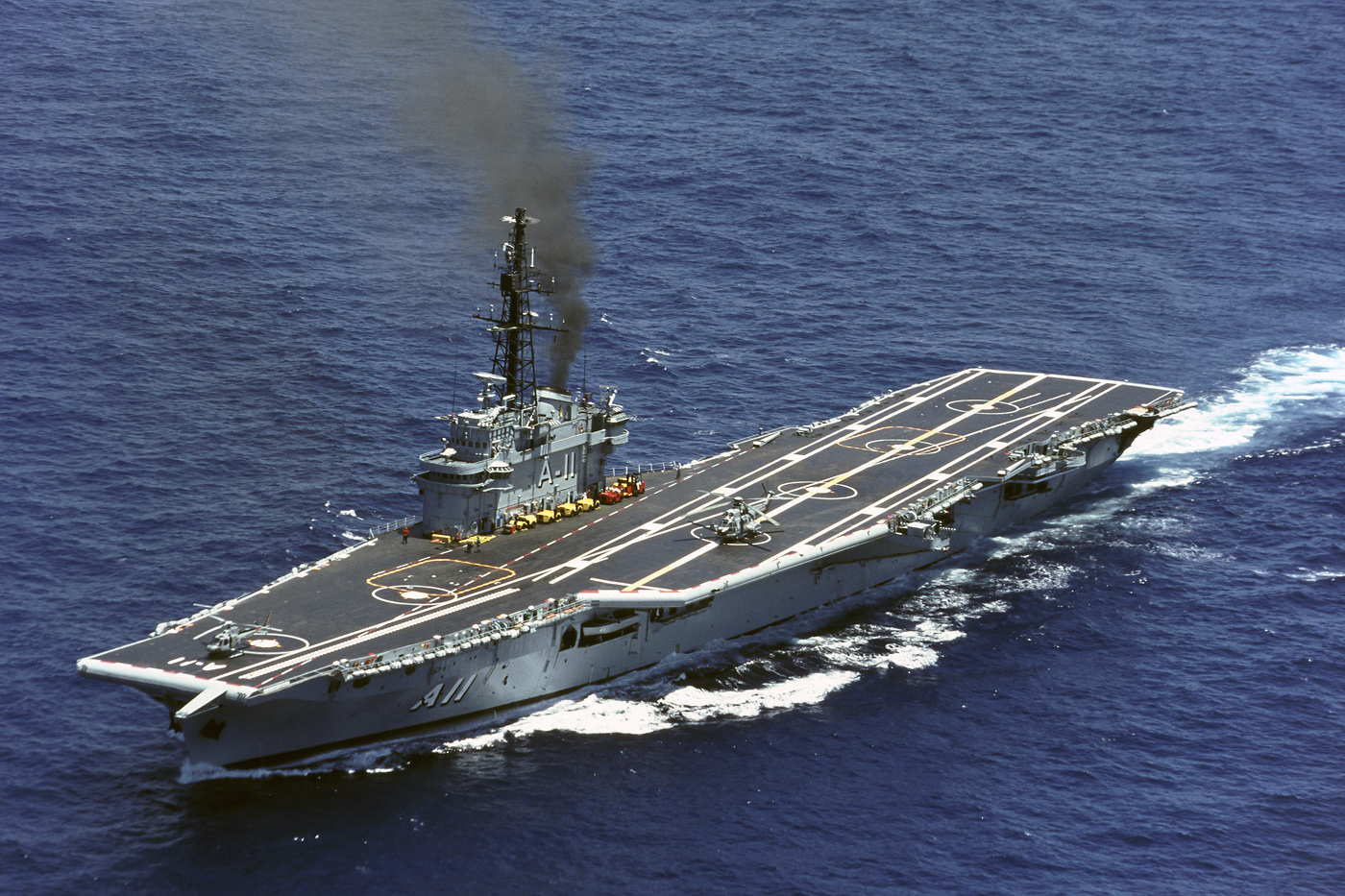
- Minas Gerais in October 1996

History

Brazil
- Name: Minas Gerais
- Namesake: State of Minas Gerais
- Builder: Swan Hunter
- Laid down: 16 November 1942 as HMS Vengeance (R71)
- Launched: 23 February 1944
- Completed: 15 January 1945
- Acquired: 14 December 1956
- Builder: Verolme Dock, Rotterdam (reconstruction)
- Cost: US$27,000,000
- Commissioned: 6 December 1960
- Decommissioned: 16 October 2001
- Fate: Scrapped in India in 2004
- Badge

General characteristics (Brazil service)
- Class & type: Modified Colossus-class aircraft carrier
- Displacement: 15,890 tons standard; 17,500 tons normal; 19,890 tons full load
- Length: 630 ft (190 m) between perpendiculars; 695 ft (212 m) overall
- Beam: 80 ft (24 m)
- Draught: 24.5 ft (7.5 m)
- Speed: 25 knots (46 km/h; 29 mph) at 120 revolutions
- Range: 12,000 nautical miles (22,000 km; 14,000 mi) at 14 knots (26 km/h; 16 mph); 6,200 nautical miles (11,500 km; 7,100 mi) at 23 knots (43 km/h; 26 mph)
- Complement: 1,000 + 300 air group
- Sensors & processing systems: Air search: Lockheed AN/SPS-40B; E/F band; Surface search: Plessey AWS 4; E/F band; Navigation: Signaal ZW06; I band; Fire control: 2 × AN/SPG-34; I/J band; CCA: Scanter Mil-Par; I band
- Armament: (1960); 10 × Bofors 40 mm anti-aircraft guns (2 quad, 1 twin); 2 × 47 mm saluting guns; (1994); 2 x twin Mistral (missile); 2 × 47 mm saluting guns
- Aircraft carried: 21
- Notes: Taken from:

NAeL Minas Gerais (pennant number A 11) was a Colossus-class light aircraft carrier operated by the Brazilian Navy from 1960 until 2001. The ship was laid down for the United Kingdom's Royal Navy during World War II as HMS Vengeance, was completed shortly before the war's end, and did not see combat. After stints as a training vessel and Arctic research ship, the carrier was loaned to the Royal Australian Navy from 1952 to 1955. She was returned to the British, who sold her to Brazil in 1956.

The ship underwent a four-year conversion in the Netherlands to make her capable of operating heavier naval aircraft. She was commissioned into the MB as Minas Gerais (named after the state of Minas Gerais) in 1960; the first purchased by a Latin American nation, and the second to enter service, behind the Argentinian ARA Independencia (also Colossus-class). Between 1987 and 1996, the carrier was unable to operate fixed-wing aircraft because of a defective catapult, and was retasked as a helicopter carrier and amphibious assault ship.

Minas Gerais remained in service until 2001, when she was replaced by NAe São Paulo. At the time of her decommissioning, she was the oldest operational aircraft carrier in the world, and the last operational unit of the World War II Light Fleet design. Despite attempts to preserve the carrier as a museum ship, and after several failed attempts to auction the ship off (including a listing on eBay), Minas Gerais was sold for scrap in 2004 and taken to Alang, India for breaking up.

== Design and construction ==
The carrier was constructed by Swan Hunter for the Royal Navy (RN) as HMS Vengeance. She was laid down on 16 November 1942, and launched on 23 February 1944. Construction was completed on 15 January 1945, and Vengeance was commissioned into the RN.

The Colossus-class carriers were intended to be 'disposable warships': they were to be operated during World War II and scrapped at the end of hostilities or within three years of entering service. Despite this plan, the ship had a service life of over 55 years across three navies.

== Early operational history ==
After commissioning, Vengeance was assigned to the 11th Aircraft Carrier Squadron, which was attached to the British Pacific Fleet. The carrier arrived in Sydney, Australia in July 1945, but remained in the harbour for refits until the end of World War II. Vengeance operated in the waters of Asia until mid-1946, when she returned to England and was reassigned as a training vessel. In late 1948, Vengeance was converted for Arctic conditions, and from February 1949 to March 1949, she operated in Arctic waters as part of an experimental cruise to determine how well ships, aircraft, and personnel functioned in extreme cold.

From late 1952 until mid-1955, Vengeance was loaned to the Royal Australian Navy, to serve in place of the under-construction HMAS Melbourne.

== Purchase and modernisation ==
During the leadup to the 1955 presidential election, Juscelino Kubitschek de Oliveira, governor of the state of Minas Gerais promised Brazilian admirals to acquire an aircraft carrier for the Marinha do Brasil (MB, Brazilian Navy). Kubitschek later claimed that this was to avoid a naval rebellion during his inauguration at the start of 1956, and despite believing in the "military uselessness" of the second-hand warship, the sale of Vengeance to Brazil for US$9 million went through on 14 December 1956.

From mid-1957 until December 1960, the carrier underwent a massive refit and reconstruction in the Netherlands. The work was carried out by Verolme Dock in Rotterdam, and cost US$27 million. The most visible change was the installation of an 8.5-degree angled flight deck. The size of the angle required that an accessway be built around the starboard side of the island superstructure; the weight acting as a counterbalance for the flight deck's portside overhang. Combined with the fitting of a more powerful steam catapult, stronger arresting gear, reinforced hangar elevators, and a mirror landing aid, these modifications permitted the operation of jet aircraft up to 20,000 pounds (9,100 kg) in weight. The carrier's island superstructure was replaced, and a lattice mast was fitted to support the new fire control system and radar suite. The ship's boiler capacity was increased, and internal electricity was converted to AC through the installation of four turbo generators and one diesel generator.

The carrier was commissioned into the Marinha do Brasil as NAeL Minas Gerais (named for Kubitschek's home state) on 6 December 1960. She departed Rotterdam for Rio de Janeiro on 13 January 1961. The duration of the refit meant that while the carrier was the first purchased by a Latin American nation, she was the second to enter service, after another Colossus-class carrier entered service with the Argentine Navy as ARA Independencia in July 1959.

=== Weapons and systems ===
During the ship's modernisation refit to become Minas Gerais, her armament was altered to consist of ten Bofors 40 mm anti-aircraft guns (2 quad mountings and 1 twin mounting), and two 47 mm saluting guns. In 1994, the Bofors were removed and replaced with two twin surface-to-air launchers for Mistral missiles. If additional armament was required, the Bofors could be reinstalled.

By 1996, Minas Gerais was fitted with the following radars: a Lockheed SPS-40B for air search, a Plessey AWS 4 for surface search, a Signaal ZW06 for navigation, two SPG-34 for fire control, and a Scanter Mil-Par for Carrier-Controlled Approach. The two search radars operate on NATO frequency bands designated E and F, the navigation and CCA radars operate on the NATO I band, and the fire control radars on both the I and J bands.

As of the mid-1990s, the carrier's air group consisted of six S-2E Trackers, four to six ASH-3D Sea Kings, two AS-355 Ecureuils, and three A-332 Super Pumas. In 1999, the MB acquired 20 A-4KU Skyhawks and 3 TA-4KU trainer aircraft from the Kuwait Air Force for $US70 million. Minas Gerais began operating these aircraft in late 2000.

== Brazilian operational history ==
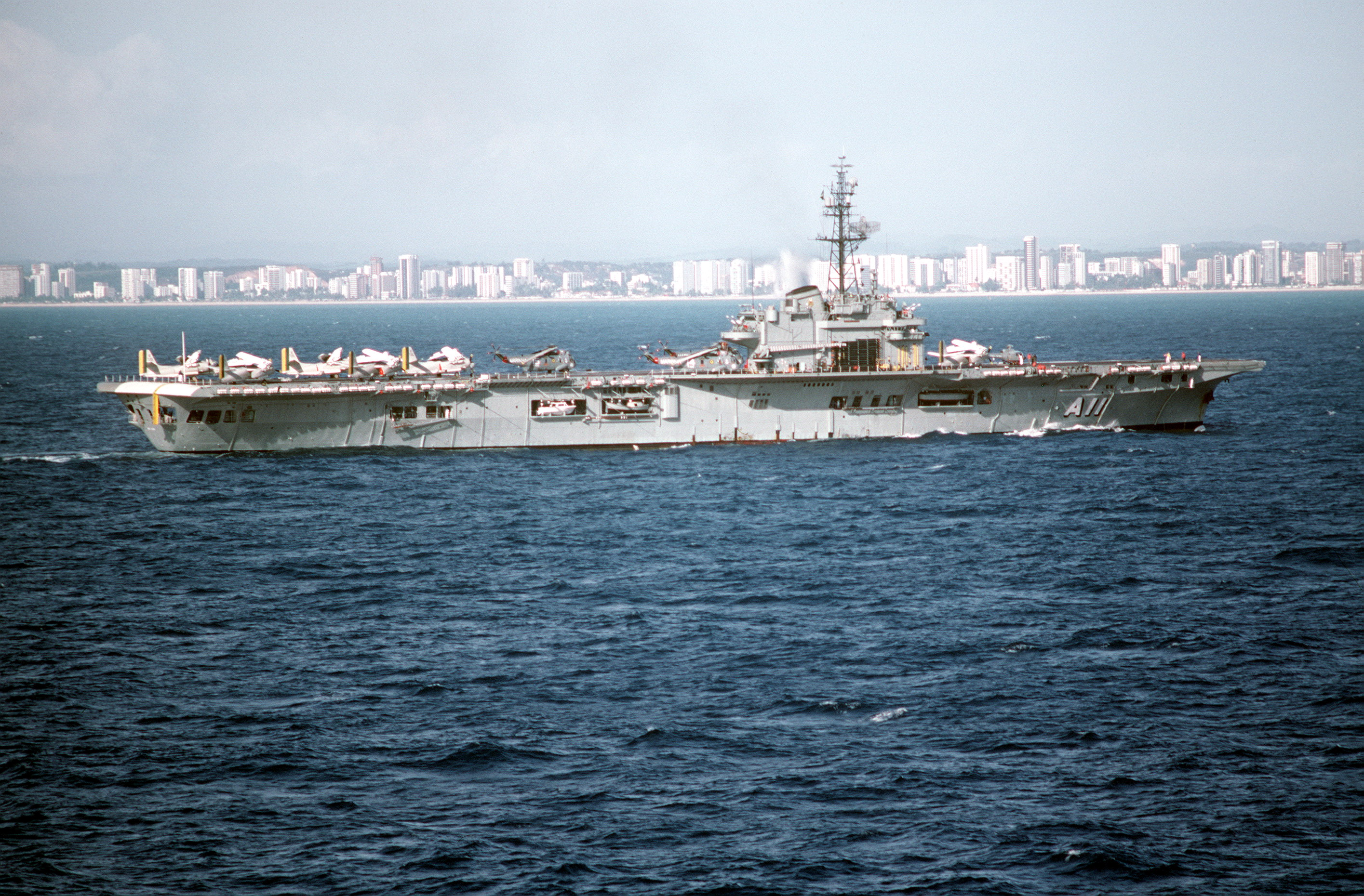
Minas Gerais underway in 1984

In 1965, President Humberto de Alencar Castelo Branco permitted the operation of helicopters to the Navy, fixed-wing aircraft were to remain the responsibility of the Força Aérea Brasileira (FAB, Brazilian Air Force). As a result, Minas Gerais was required to embark two air groups: the Navy operated helicopters while the Air Force operated S-2 Tracker aircraft. Consequently, the ship spent most of her Brazilian career operating as an anti-submarine warfare carrier.

From 1976 to 1981, the ship underwent a major refit. Work included the installation of a datalink to improve co-operation with Niterói-class frigates, updates to the radar suite, and other work to extend the carrier's life expectancy into the 1990s. In 1986, engine problems, combined with the inability for Argentina to fund a required modernisation of ARA Veinticinco de Mayo, saw the Argentine Colossus-class carrier confined to port, making Minas Gerais the only active aircraft carrier in the South American region. In December 1987, Minas Gerais herself was laid up after participating in Operation Dragon XXIII because of problems with her aircraft catapult. Although unable to operate as an aircraft carrier, the ship saw use over the following years in training exercises as an amphibious assault ship; using an air group of Eurocopter AS532 Cougar and Eurocopter AS350 Squirrel helicopters to transport Marines ashore.

Minas Gerais underwent a modernisation refit from July 1991 to October 1993. This included the overhaul of the boilers and engines, integration of a SICONTA command system, two new navigation radars and Scanter-MIL landing radar were installed, and preparation for the installation of Simbad launchers for Mistral surface-to-air missiles. The launchers themselves were installed in 1994, with the ten Bofors removed at the same time. The Bofors could be reinstalled to complement the ship's armament if needed. In November 1993, the carrier conducted a joint exercise with the Argentine Navy, where Argentine pilots flying Dassault-Breguet Super Étendard aircraft performed 177 touch-and-go landings, in order to maintain their carrier landing qualifications while Veinticinco de Mayo was out of service.

During 1995 and 1996, the ability to operate fixed-wing aircraft was restored to Minas Gerais after the catapult from the decommissioned Veinticinco de Mayo was acquired and installed. In 1997, Minas Gerais was loaned an A-4Q airframe by the Argentine Aviación Naval (Naval Aviation) for deck-handling and interface trials. This was in lead-up to the 1999 acquisition of 20 A-4KU Skyhawks and three TA-4KU trainer aircraft from the Kuwait Air Force for US$70 million. This was the first time since the carrier's commissioning that Força Aeronaval da Marinha (Brazilian Navy Aviation) had been permitted to own and operate fixed-wing aircraft. The 23 aircraft were formed as the First Intercept and Attack Squadron, had all entered service by early 2000, and began carrier operations in late October 2000. In order to operate the new fighters, Minas Gerais underwent a major refit at the Arsenal de Marinha do Rio de Janeiro. The main purpose of this refit was to upgrade the catapult to launch Skyhawks.

== Replacement and decommissioning ==
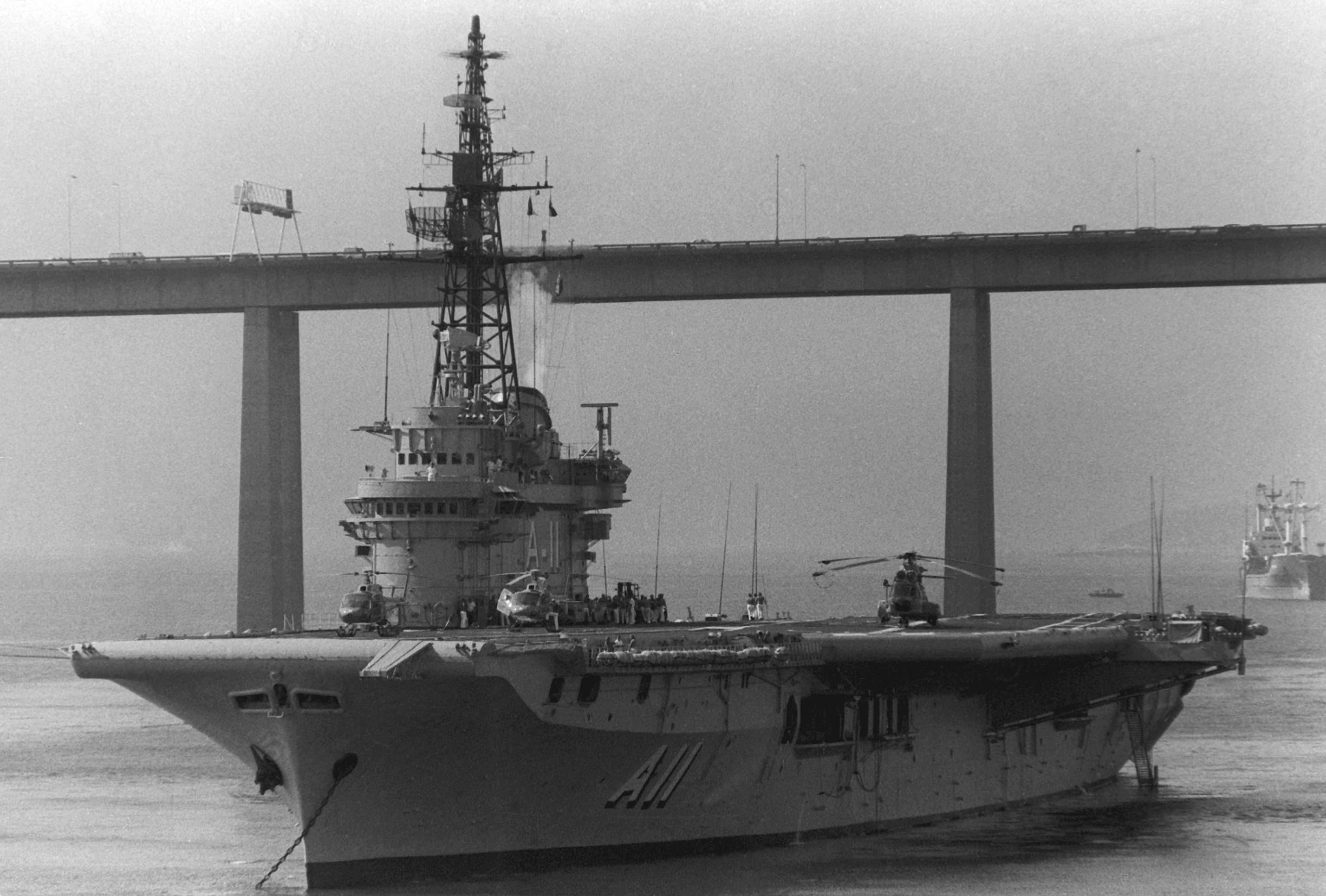
Minas Gerais at anchor in Rio de Janeiro in 1995

The replacement of Minas Gerais was first suggested in the early 1980s, as part of planned 15-year naval expansion program. Two different carrier designs were proposed. The first was for a 40,000-ton ship equipped with up to forty aircraft, including naval fighters. To complement this proposal, a plan to expand the Brazilian fleet air arm by acquiring second-hand A-4 Skyhawks from Kuwait or Israel was submitted. For this to happen, the 1965 ruling that prevented the MB from operating fixed-wing aircraft had to be overturned; a decision the FAB opposed. To make the purchase worthwhile, Minas Gerais would have to operate the aircraft until the replacement carrier entered service, which in turn required the installation of a modified steam catapult and arresting gear. As the ship had just emerged from a modernisation refit, this was an expensive proposition, and the Skyhawk acquisition plan was cancelled in October 1984. The Skyhawk plan was successfully revisited in the late 1990s. The second proposal was for a 25,000-ton helicopter carrier built to commercial standards. Later interpretations of this proposal suggested a ship similar to the Royal Navy's HMS Ocean.

Replacement of Minas Gerais was under serious consideration by 1999; despite numerous refits and life-extending upgrades, the MB predicted that the carrier would require replacement before 2010. As well as the two proposals, consideration was given to acquiring a second-hand carrier, such as the French Navy's Foch. One of the main issues in considering the replacement was the MB's significant investment in fixed-wing aviation in the late 1990s; a carrier capable of operating the recently acquired Skyhawks would be more expensive to acquire and operate than a STOVL or helicopter carrier, but the cheaper concepts would require the refactoring of Brazilian naval aviation. In the end, Foch was acquired, renamed NAe São Paulo, and slated to commission into the Marinha do Brasil in April 2001. She was downclassed as a helicopter support ship in 2001 before her decommissioning.

Minas Gerais was decommissioned on 16 October 2001: the last of the World War II-era light aircraft carriers to leave service. At the time of her decommissioning, she was the oldest active aircraft carrier in the world (a title passed on to the 1961-commissioned USS Kitty Hawk). Also at the decommissioning ceremony was 87-year-old Admiral Hélio Leôncio Martins, who was the first commander of the aircraft carrier. There were also crew who had served on the Minas Gerais at different times. The carrier was marked for sale in 2002, and was sought after by British naval associations for return to the United Kingdom and preservation as a museum ship, although they were unable to raise the required money. Just before Christmas 2003, the carrier was listed for sale on auction website eBay by a user claiming to be a shipbroker representing the owner. Bidding reached £4 million before the auction was removed from the website under rules preventing the sale of military ordnance. An auction in Rio de Janeiro in February 2004 also failed to sell the ship. Sometime between February and July 2004, the carrier was towed to the Alang Ship Breaking Yard, India for dismantling.

== See also ==
- Brazilian aircraft carrier São Paulo
- List of historical ships of the Brazilian Navy
