= Conolly Abel Smith =

Royal Navy Vice Admiral (1899–1985)

Vice-Admiral Sir Conolly Abel Smith GCVO CB JP
- Vice Admiral Abel Smith in 1960.
- Born: 3 December 1899; Branston, Lincolnshire, England
- Died: 3 December 1985 (aged 86); Galashiels, Scotland
- Military career
- Allegiance: United Kingdom
- Branch: Royal Navy
- Service years: 1912–1958
- Rank: Vice-Admiral
- Commands: No. 403 Flight FAA; No. 408 Flight FAA; Fighter Squadron 802 FAA; HMS London; HMS Condor (RNAS Arbroath); HMS Biter; HMS Heron (RNAS Yeovilton); HMS Triumph; HMY Britannia
- Conflicts: First World War; Second World War
- Awards: Knight Grand Cross of the Royal Victorian Order; Companion of the Order of the Bath; Mentioned in Despatches

Arms of Smith: Or, a chevron cotised sable between three demi-griffins couped of the last the two in chief respecting each other

Vice-Admiral Sir Edward Michael Conolly Abel Smith, GCVO, CB, JP (3 December 1899 – 3 December 1985) was a Royal Navy officer who served during the First and Second World Wars.

== Family ==
Conolly Abel Smith (as he was usually known) was the second son of Eustace Abel Smith, JP, a banker of Longhills House, Branston, Lincolnshire, and Aileen Geta Katherine Conolly, the daughter of Colonel John Augustus Conolly, VC.

== Naval career ==
Abel Smith entered the Royal Naval College, Osborne, in September 1912, at the age of 13, continuing his training at Royal Naval College, Dartmouth. From 1915 he served aboard the battlecruiser Princess Royal, receiving promotion to sub-lieutenant on 15 May 1918, and to lieutenant on 15 May 1920.

On 16 June 1924 Abel Smith was attached to the Royal Air Force, who were in control of all naval aviation at that time, with the rank of flying officer, to attend No. 1 Flying Training School at Netheravon, Wiltshire. From 23 October 1925 he was stationed at HMS Columbine, the naval base at Port Edgar in the Firth of Forth, then from 3 April 1926 served as the Flight Commander of No. 403 Flight FAA aboard the carrier Hermes on the China Station, receiving promotion to flight lieutenant on 1 January 1928 and to lieutenant-commander on 15 May 1928. From 3 March 1929 he served aboard the heavy cruiser Cumberland, and from 20 March 1930 on the carrier Glorious in the Mediterranean Fleet, firstly as the Flight Commander of No. 408 Flight, then as Squadron Commander of Fighter Squadron 802 FAA. He was promoted to squadron leader on 1 January 1933 and commander on 30 June 1933.

From 14 May 1934 Abel Smith attended a tactical course at Portsmouth Naval Base, and from 3 September 1934 he served in the Naval Air Division of the Admiralty in London. On 8 December 1936 he was appointed commanding officer of the cruiser London in the Mediterranean, receiving promotion to wing commander on 1 January 1937. From 2 January 1939 he was attached to the Admiralty, serving as Naval Equerry to King George VI.

In August 1939 he was appointed Commander (Flying) in the carrier HMS Courageous which was sunk by a U-boat on 17 September 1939 off the south coast of Ireland, losing half her complement. He received promotion to captain on 30 June 1940. From 5 July 1940 Abel Smith served as Commanding Officer of HMS Condor, the Royal Naval Air Station at Arbroath. In January 1942 he was appointed Commanding Officer of the escort carrier Biter, and received a Mention in Despatches for his efforts during the invasion of North Africa ("Operation Torch"). He returned to shore duty in July 1943 to serve as commander of HMS Heron (RNAS Yeovilton). From 28 March 1944 he was the Assistant Naval Attaché (from 26 September 1944 the Naval Attaché) and the Naval Air Attaché at the British Embassy, Washington, D.C. (HMS Saker) until early 1946.

On 24 June 1946 Abel Smith was appointed flag captain of the carrier Triumph, serving until May 1949. On 8 July 1949 he was promoted to rear-admiral. From 1950 to 1951 he served as Vice-Controller (Air), Chief of Naval Air Equipment and Chief Naval Representative to the Ministry of Supply. On 2 February 1953 he was appointed Flag Officer, Royal Yachts (FORY), serving as commanding officer of HMY Britannia, and as the Flag Officer of Royal Navy. receiving promotion to vice-admiral on 1 September 1952.

Abel Smith retired on 14 February 1958 and was appointed Lord Lieutenant of Selkirkshire on the 16th, serving until 1975. He also served as a Justice of the Peace, and as an Extra Naval Equerry to Queen Elizabeth II.

== Personal life ==
On 28 December 1932 Abel Smith married Lady Mary Elizabeth Carnegie (1899–1996), daughter of Charles Carnegie, 10th Earl of Southesk, at St Andrew's Church, Brechin. They had one daughter (b. 1936) and one son (b. 1939).

== Cultural references ==
Conolly Abel-Smith has been portrayed on screen by Adrian Lukis in the second season of The Crown. In Len Deighton's book SS-GB, Conolly is the leader of a struggling British government-in-exile.

== Awards and honours ==
- Companion of the Order of the Bath (CB), 7 June 1951
- Grand Cross of the Royal Victorian Order (GCVO), 1 January 1958
- Knight Commander of the Royal Victorian Order (KCVO), 25 May 1954
- Commander of the Royal Victorian Order (CVO), 13 June 1946

Also:

- Commander 1st class of the Order of the Dannebrog (Denmark), May 1957
- Grand Cross of the Military Order of Aviz (Portugal), February 1957
- Grand Cross of the Order of St. Olav (Norway), June 1955

Honorary titles
Preceded by Sir Samuel Strang Steel	Lord Lieutenant of Selkirkshire; 1958–1975	Succeeded by John Scott, 9th Duke of Buccleuch
