= List of Hawker Hart and variants operators =

Several countries and many Royal Air Force units operated the Hawker Hart and its variants.

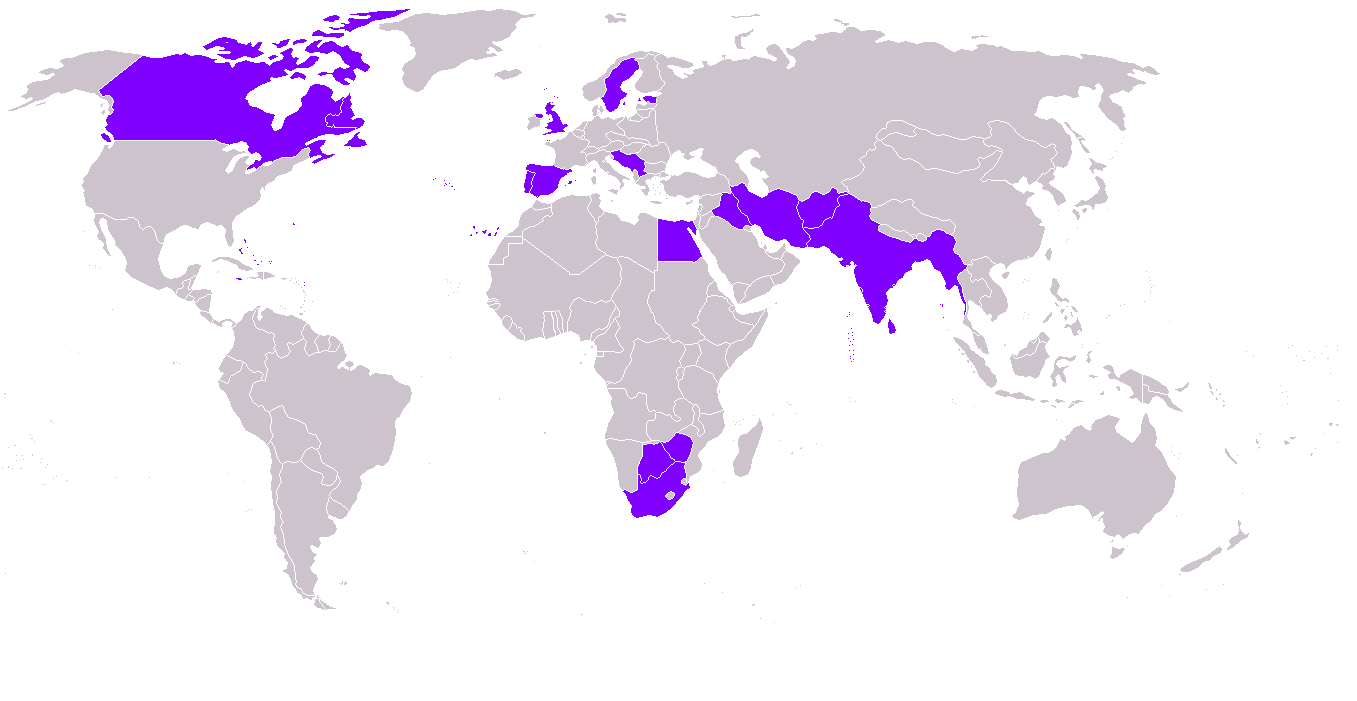
Hart, Audax, Demon, and Osprey operators

== Operators ==
=== Hawker Hart ===
Afghanistan

- Afghan Air Force received eight aircraft in 1937.

Canada

- Royal Canadian Air Force

Egypt

- Royal Egyptian Air Force

Estonia

- Estonian Air Force received eight Harts with interchangeable wheel and float undercarriages in 1932. They remained in use until the Soviet occupation of Estonia in 1940.

Finland

- Finnish Air Force received five ex-Swedish Air Force Harts in 1940.

British India

- Royal Indian Air Force
  - No. 1 Squadron, Indian Air Force
  - No. 2 Squadron, Indian Air Force
  - No. 1 Service Flying Training School, Ambala

Iran

- Imperial Iranian Air Force

South Africa

- South African Air Force received over 50 ex-RAF Harts from 1937.
  - 1 Squadron SAAF

Southern Rhodesia

- Southern Rhodesian Air Force
  - No. 1 Squadron

Sweden

- Royal Swedish Air Force received four Hawker-built Harts powered by Bristol Pegasus radial engines in 1934, with 42 more Pegasus powered Harts built under licence.

United Kingdom

- Royal Air Force
  - No. 5 Squadron RAF June 1940–February 1941
  - No. 6 Squadron RAF October 1935–March 1938
  - No. 11 Squadron RAF February 1932–July 1939
  - No. 12 Squadron RAF January 1931–October 1936
  - No. 15 Squadron RAF June 1934–March 1936
  - No. 17 Squadron RAF October 1935–May 1936
  - No. 18 Squadron RAF November 1931–May 1936
  - No. 24 Squadron RAF
  - No. 27 Squadron RAF 1939–1940
  - No. 33 Squadron RAF February 1930–March 1938
  - No. 39 Squadron RAF November 1931–July 1939
  - No. 40 Squadron RAF November 1935–March 1936
  - No. 45 Squadron RAF September 1935–January 1936
  - No. 57 Squadron RAF October 1931–May 1936
  - No. 60 Squadron RAF
  - No. 81 Squadron RAF
  - No. 142 Squadron RAF
  - No. 173 Squadron RAF
  - No. 235 Squadron RAF
  - No. 237 Squadron RAF
  - No. 296 Squadron RAF
  - No. 500 Squadron RAF
  - No. 501 Squadron RAF
  - No. 502 Squadron RAF
  - No. 503 Squadron RAF
  - No. 504 Squadron RAF
  - No. 510 Squadron RAF
  - No. 600 Squadron RAF
  - No. 601 Squadron RAF
  - No. 602 Squadron RAF
  - No. 603 Squadron RAF
  - No. 604 Squadron RAF
  - No. 605 Squadron RAF
  - No. 609 Squadron RAF
  - No. 610 Squadron RAF
  - No. 611 Squadron RAF
- Fleet Air Arm
  - 780 Naval Air Squadron
  - 781 Naval Air Squadron

Kingdom of Yugoslavia

- Royal Yugoslav Air Force - Four Harts were loaned to Yugoslavia in 1931.

=== Hawker Audax ===
British India

- Royal Indian Air Force
  - No. 1 Squadron, Indian Air Force
  - No. 2 Squadron, Indian Air Force
  - No. 3 Squadron, Indian Air Force
  - No. 4 Squadron, Indian Air Force
  - No. 1 Service Flying Training School, Ambala

Canada

- Royal Canadian Air Force

Egypt

- 4 Squadron, Royal Egyptian Air Force

Iraq

- Iraqi Air Force

Iran

- Imperial Iranian Air Force

Southern Rhodesia

- Southern Rhodesian Air Force
  - No. 1 Squadron

Straits Settlements

United Kingdom

- Royal Air Force
  - No. 2 Squadron RAF
  - No. 4 Squadron RAF
  - No. 5 Squadron RAF in India
  - No. 13 Squadron RAF
  - No. 16 Squadron RAF
  - No. 20 Squadron RAF
  - No. 24 Squadron RAF
  - No. 26 Squadron RAF
  - No. 28 Squadron RAF
  - No. 52 Squadron RAF
  - No. 61 Squadron RAF
  - No. 63 Squadron RAF
  - No. 77 Squadron RAF
  - No. 105 Squadron RAF
  - No. 114 Squadron RAF
  - No. 144 Squadron RAF
  - No. 146 Squadron RAF
  - No. 148 Squadron RAF
  - No. 173 Squadron RAF
  - No. 208 Squadron RAF
  - No. 211 Squadron RAF
  - No. 226 Squadron RAF
  - No. 237 Squadron RAF
  - No. 267 Squadron RAF
  - No. 615 Squadron RAF
- Fleet Air Arm
  - 780 Naval Air Squadron

=== Hawker Demon ===
Australia

- Royal Australian Air Force
  - No. 1 Squadron RAAF
  - No. 2 Squadron RAAF
  - No. 3 Squadron RAAF
  - No. 4 Squadron RAAF
  - No. 12 Squadron RAAF
  - No. 21 Squadron RAAF
  - No. 22 Squadron RAAF
  - No. 23 Squadron RAAF
  - No. 25 Squadron RAAF
  - No. 1 Service Flying Training School
  - No. 1 Air Depot
  - No. 2 Air Depot
  - No. 3 Bombing and Gunnery School
  - Communications and Survey Flight

United Kingdom

- Royal Air Force
  - No. 6 Squadron RAF
  - No. 23 Squadron RAF
  - No. 25 Squadron RAF
  - No. 29 Squadron RAF
  - No. 41 Squadron RAF
  - No. 64 Squadron RAF
  - No. 65 Squadron RAF
  - No. 74 Squadron RAF
  - No. 208 Squadron RAF
  - No. 600 Squadron RAF
  - No. 601 Squadron RAF
  - No. 604 Squadron RAF
  - No. 607 Squadron RAF
  - No. 608 Squadron RAF

=== Hawker Hardy ===
Belgian Congo

- Force Publique

United Kingdom

- Royal Air Force
  - No. 6 Squadron RAF
  - No. 30 Squadron RAF

Southern Rhodesia

- Southern Rhodesia Air Force
  - No. 237 Squadron RAF

=== Hawker Hartebeest ===
South Africa

- South African Air Force
  - 1 Squadron SAAF
  - 2 Squadron SAAF
  - 40 Squadron SAAF
  - 41 Squadron SAAF

=== Hawker Osprey ===
Portugal

- Portuguese Navy

Spain

- Spanish Republican Navy

Sweden

- Royal Swedish Air Force

United Kingdom

- Fleet Air Arm
  - 701 Naval Air Squadron
  - 711 Naval Air Squadron
  - 712 Naval Air Squadron
  - 713 Naval Air Squadron
  - 714 Naval Air Squadron
  - 715 Naval Air Squadron
  - 716 Naval Air Squadron
  - 718 Naval Air Squadron
  - 750 Naval Air Squadron
  - 755 Naval Air Squadron
  - 757 Naval Air Squadron
  - 758 Naval Air Squadron
  - 759 Naval Air Squadron
  - 800 Naval Air Squadron
  - 801 Naval Air Squadron
  - 802 Naval Air Squadron
  - 803 Naval Air Squadron
  - No. 404 (Fleet Fighter) Flight
  - No. 405 (Fleet Fighter) Flight
  - No. 406 (Fleet Fighter) Flight
  - No. 407 (Fleet Fighter) Flight
  - No. 409 (Fleet Fighter) Flight
  - No. 443 (Fleet Reconnaissance) Flight
  - No. 444 (Fleet Reconnaissance) Flight
  - No. 445 (Fleet Reconnaissance) Flight
  - No. 447 (Fleet Reconnaissance) Flight

== See also ==
- Hawker Hart
- Hawker Hind

== Bibliography ==
- Halley, James J. The Squadrons of the Royal Air Force. Tonbridge, Kent, UK: Air-Britain (Historians), 1980. ISBN 0-85130-083-9.
- Mason, Francis K. The British Bomber Since 1914. London: Putnam Aeronautical Books, 1994. ISBN 0-85177-861-5.
- Mason, Francis K. The British Fighter since 1912. Annapolis, Maryland, USA: Naval Institute Press, 1992. ISBN 1-55750-082-7.
- Mason, Francis K. Hawker Aircraft since 1920. London: Putnam Aeronautical Books, 1991. ISBN 0-85177-839-9.
- Sturtivant, Ray and Balance, Theo. The Squadrons of the Fleet Air Arm. Tonbridge, Kent, UK: Air-Britain (Historians), 1994. ISBN 0-85130-223-8.
- Thetford, Owen. "By Day and By Night: Hawker Hart and Hind": Operational History Part One. Aeroplane Monthly, July 1995, Vol. 24 No. 1, Issue No 267, pp. 50–57. London: IPC. ISSN 0143-7240.
- Wixey, Ken. "Hart Of The Matter:Part One - Hawker's Hart 'Family': The Hart Bomber And The Army Co-Op Audax". Air Enthusiast, No 96, November/December 2001. Stamford UK: Key Publishing. pp. 24–33.
