= Peter Carmichael (Royal Navy officer) =

Former Royal Navy pilot

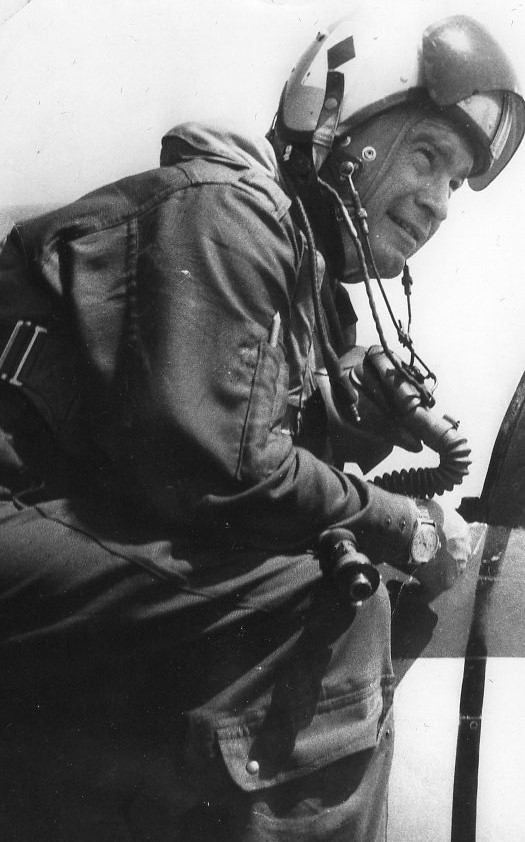
- Born: 11 August 1923; Hull
- Died: 25 July 1997 (aged 73); Holyhead
- Military career
- Allegiance: United Kingdom
- Branch: Royal Navy
- Service years: 1942–1984
- Rank: Commander
- Nickname: "Hoagy"
- Commands: 806 Naval Air Squadron
- Conflicts: Second World War; Korean War
- Awards: Officer of the Order of the British Empire; Distinguished Service Cross

Commander Peter Carmichael, OBE, DSC (11 August 1923 – 25 July 1997), nicknamed "Hoagy", was a combat pilot with the Royal Navy during and after the Second World War. Later, he became famous during the Korean War for allegedly shooting down a jet-engined MiG-15 while flying a piston-engined Hawker Sea Fury, the only recorded victory of a piston-engined aircraft over a jet fighter during the Korean War. However, this claim is now disputed, and the kill is currently claimed by another Royal Navy pilot – Brian 'Schmoo' Ellis – flying with Carmichael on the day in-question.

== Early life and career ==
Carmichael was born on 11 August 1923 and attended Worksop College a Public School in North Nottinghamshire. Carmichael was a renowned schoolboy rugby player and played for both the Rest of England versus Home Counties (where he scored three tries) and the North of England Public Schools in 1941. After leaving school he joined the Royal Navy in 1942 and undertook pilot training in the United States and South Africa, before flying Supermarine Seafires and Chance-Vought F4U Corsairs during the final days of the Second World War. After the war, Carmichael flew the Blackburn Firebrand, before converting to the Hawker Sea Fury in June 1948.

== Korean War ==
In November 1951 Carmichael, along with the rest of 802 Squadron, received notification that the squadron would be deployed to Korea in early 1952, starting with a short voyage to Malta aboard HMS Theseus. This was followed by a two-month break for an intensive work-up at RNAS Hal Far, before the squadron sailed to Korea aboard HMS Ocean in April, with a four-day stop over in Hong Kong to receive additional aircraft and pilots.

=== MiG kill ===
On 9 August 1952 Carmichael, flying his regular Sea Fury (WJ232), was leading a four aircraft formation to attack railway facilities between Manchon and Pyongyang when, in the vicinity of Chinnampo, his Number 2, Sub-Lieutenant Carl Haines, gave a radio warning of MiGs diving towards the Sea Furys from behind and the right. As Carmichael later stated:

Eight MiGs came at us out of the sun. I did not see them at first, and my No. 4, 'Smoo' Ellis, gave a break when he noticed tracer streaming past his fuselage.
We all turned towards the MiGs and commenced a 'scissors'. It soon became apparent that four MiGs were after each section of two Furies, but by continuing our break turns, we presented impossible targets. They made no attempt to bracket us.
One MiG came at me head on. I saw his heavy tracer shells. I fired a burst, then he flashed past me. I believe Carl got some hits on him too. This aircraft then broke away, and went head on to my Nos 3 and 4, Lieutenant Pete Davies and 'Smoo' Ellis. They were seen to get good hits on one who broke away with smoke coming from him.

Although some sources claim a second MiG-15 was downed by the British pilots, most accounts do not mention this. Regardless, this incident was the only air-to-air engagement by a British pilot in a British aircraft during the Korean War. However, Royal Air Force pilots flying on exchange with the USAF did claim at least seven kills during the course of the conflict.

He was subsequently awarded the Distinguished Service Cross in 1953.

In 2018, it was found that the kill may have been erroneously credited to Lieutenant Carmichael; The kill is now claimed by Brian 'Schmoo' Ellis, a sub-lieutenant flying in formation with Lieutenant Carmichael that day. Ellis claims that he was the only pilot in the flight that returned with no ammunition left, while Carmichael only expended about 10% of his cannon rounds during a routine 'gun check' strafing-run on a stretch of sand. Ellis claims that the Royal Navy simply awarded the kill to the most senior man in the flight – Carmichael – despite most of the flight knowing the truth. The Royal Navy has not disputed Ellis' claim, and although there was no gyro gun sight camera to prove him correct, his colleagues also endorsed that credit should go to him.

== Later service ==
By 1960, Carmichael was commanding officer of Lossiemouth based 806 Naval Air Squadron, the last Royal Navy unit flying Hawker Sea Hawks. He was appointed an Officer of the Order of the British Empire in the 1968 New Year Honours, and later went on to serve as Commanding Officer of T.S. Prince of Wales, Holyhead Sea Cadets until his retirement in 1984. Carmichael died on 25 July 1997.
