= No. 408 (Fleet Fighter) Flight RAF =

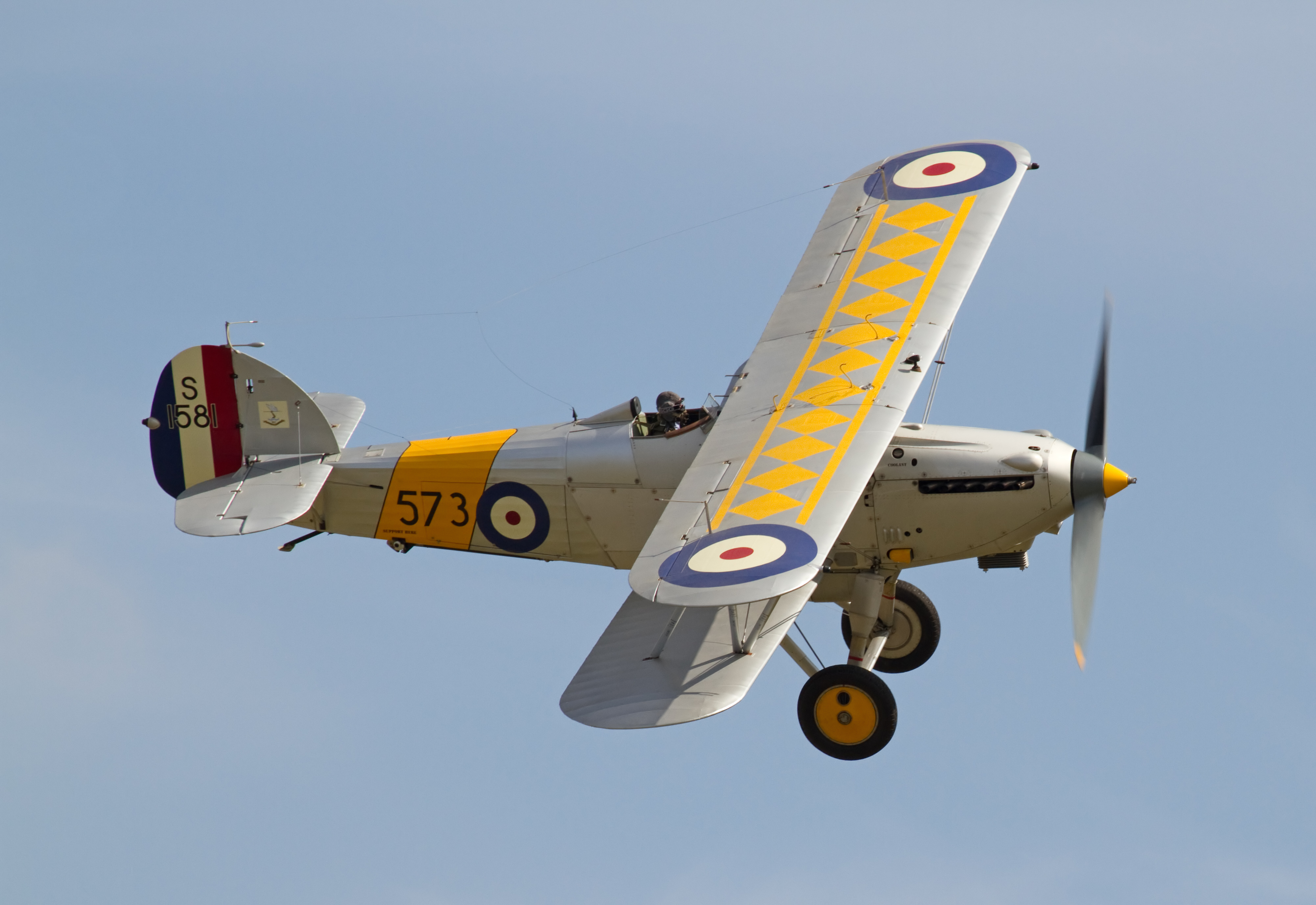
Hawker Nimrod S1585, painted in the colours it wore while serving with 408 Flight, (2011)

408 (Fleet Fighter) Flight was a naval aviation unit of the Royal Air Force operating during the early 1930s.

== Early history ==
408 (Fleet Fighter) Flight was formed on 30 March 1929 at RNAS Donibristle.

The following aircraft were known to be used by this flight:

- Fairey Flycatcher S1293 19
- Hawker Nimrod S1585 576.

== Disbandment ==
The unit was disbanded and merged with 409 (Fleet Fighter) Flight aboard HMS Glorious on 3 April 1933, both units becoming 802 Naval Air Squadron.
