= No. 409 (Fleet Fighter) Flight RAF =

No. 409 (Fleet Fighter) Flight was a naval aviation unit of the Royal Air Force operating during the early 1930s.

The unit was formed on 7 October 1932 at Gosport. The Flight was disbanded and merged with 408 (Fleet Fighter) Flight aboard HMS Glorious on 3 April 1933, to form 802 Naval Air Squadron.
