= Air Battle of South Korea =

Air campaign early in the Korean War (1950)

- Part of Korean War
Date	25 June to 20 July 1950
Location	Over Kimpo and Suwon, South Korea and Pyongyang, North Korea
Result	United Nations victory

Belligerents
United States; South Korea; United Kingdom; Australia	North Korea

Commanders and leaders
(United States) George E. Stratemeyer	

Units involved
(United States) Fifth Air Force (First Republic of Korea) Republic of Korea Air Force (Australia) No. 77 Squadron RAAF (United Kingdom) 800 Naval Air Squadron (United Kingdom) 802 Naval Air Squadron	(North Korea) 1st Air Division

Strength
1,200 aircraft	132 aircraft

Casualties and losses
~10 aircraft destroyed, ~20 aircraft damaged	110 aircraft destroyed

The Air Battle of South Korea was an air campaign early in the Korean War occurring roughly from 25 June to 20 July 1950 over South Korea between the air forces of North Korea and the United Nations, including the countries of South Korea, the United States and the United Kingdom. The month-long fight for air supremacy over the country included several small engagements over airfields in Seoul and Taejon and ultimately ended in victory for the UN air force, which was able to destroy the small North Korean People's Air Force.

== Background ==
=== Invasion ===
On the morning of 25 June 1950, ten divisions of the North Korean People's Army launched a full-scale invasion of the nation's neighbor to the south, the Republic of Korea. The force of 89,000 men moved in six columns, catching the Republic of Korea Army by surprise, resulting in a rout. The smaller South Korean army suffered from widespread lack of organization and equipment, and was unprepared for war. The numerically superior North Korean force destroyed isolated resistance from the 38,000 South Korean soldiers on the front before it began moving steadily south.

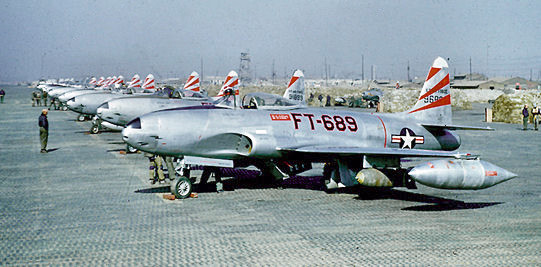
F-80Cs of the 8th Fighter-Bomber Group in Korea during the summer of 1950.

To prevent South Korea's collapse, the United Nations Security Council voted to send military forces. The United States Seventh Fleet dispatched Task Force 77, led by the fleet carrier USS Valley Forge; the British Far East Fleet dispatched several ships, including HMS Triumph, to provide air and naval support. By 27 June the naval and air forces moving to Korea had authorization to attack North Korean targets with the goal of helping repel the North Korean invasion of the country. With the US forces seeing the North Korean attack as an act of war, it became imperative to evacuate civilians and American diplomats from Korea, as the forces of the North and South were battling across the peninsula. On 27 June the South Koreans were losing the First Battle of Seoul. Most of South Korea's forces retreated in the face of the invasion. The North Koreans captured the city on 28 June, forcing the South Korean government and its shattered army to retreat further south.

In the meantime, US naval and air forces were evacuating US diplomats, military dependents, and civilians by ship and air transport, hoping to get American civilians out of the country "by any means." Civilians were being gathered at Suwon Airfield and Kimpo Airfield near Seoul, before moving to Incheon and out of the country. These airlifts and convoys were being escorted by aircraft from the Far East Air Force, which was operating its aircraft from bases in Japan.

=== Air forces involved ===
The United States Air Force had 1,172 aircraft in the Pacific region at the time of the outbreak of the Korean War, including hundreds of F-80 Shooting Stars as well as numerous F-82 Twin Mustangs, B-26 Invaders, B-29 Superfortresses, among others. Hundreds of aircraft were available to be immediately mustered against the North Korean invasion, many of them the newest jet engine-powered fighter aircraft. The aircraft could fulfill a variety of missions and were well equipped, well armed and out of reach of North Korean attack, with many bases safely in Japan. Additionally, the Fleet Air Arm of the United Kingdom, and the Royal Australian Air Force of Australia provided assistance as 800 Naval Air Squadron, 802 Naval Air Squadron, and No. 77 Squadron RAAF were dispatched to provide additional support for ground operations. The combined airpower had about 33,975 personnel. The Republic of Korea Air Force had 1,800 personnel but only 22 planes: 12 liaison aircraft and 10 T-6 Texan trainer aircraft purchased from Canada.

The North Korean People's Air Force (KPAF) consisted of 132 aircraft and 2,000 personnel, of whom only 80 were pilots and most poorly trained. The two Koreas had very small air forces of their own, with the North Koreans' 132 aircraft organized into the KPAF 1st Air Division. At the start of the war, these aircraft were used boldly to the North Koreans' advantage. Aware of their air superiority over the Republic of Korea Air Force and not expecting UN intervention, the North anticipated light resistance in the air.

== History ==
=== Battle ===
At the 25 June outbreak of the war, the US aircraft in Japan immediately began moving to the closest bases to the Korean Peninsula, Itazuke Air Base and Ashiya Air Base. UN Commander Douglas MacArthur ordered another 250 aircraft brought to Korea for the conflict.

==== Attack at Suwon ====
North Korean aircraft first met US aircraft in combat during the Battle of Suwon Airfield, in which 7 of the 13 North Korean aircraft were destroyed. The Lavochkin La-7 and Ilyushin Il-10 were easily outmatched by the superior F-82s and F-80Cs, which also had better-trained pilots. The 8th Fighter Wing, which was attempting to defend Suwon to allow evacuation of US civilians, encountered repeated harassing attacks from the North Koreans operating out of Heijo Airfield in Pyongyang. Heijo was the KPAF's main base, but in the first few days in the war the US pilots only had authorization to defend themselves if attacked; they could not conduct offensive operations into North Korea.

==== Raid of Heijo Airfield ====
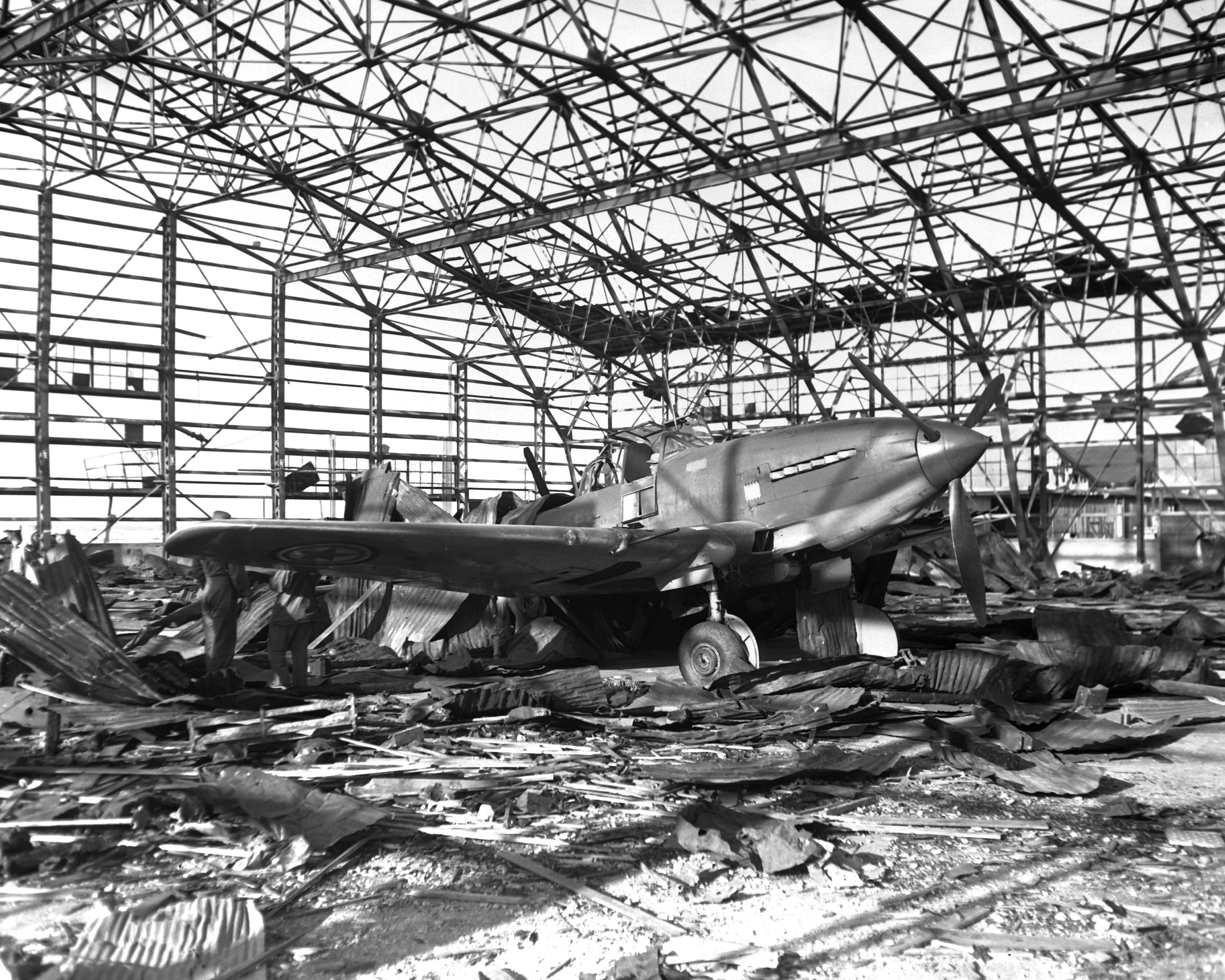
North Korean Ilyushin Il-10 at Kimpo International Airport, South Korea.

On 29 June the KPAF returned to attack Suwon, and six sorties strafed the airfield during the morning, but each time were driven off by F-80s. In the course of these attacks Lieutenant William T. Norris and Lieutenant Roy W. Marsh each shot down a North Korean aircraft. The North Koreans were able to destroy a C-54 Skymaster parked at the airfield. The sorties culminated in a battle above Suwon in the midst of a conference of US military leaders in the town. Leaders including MacArthur and Lieutenant General George E. Stratemeyer personally witnessed the final sortie of the day, in which four North Korean aircraft attacked four P-51 Mustangs over the town. The P-51s succeeded in shooting down all four North Korean aircraft, with Lieutenant Orrin R. Fox scoring two kills and Lieutenants Richard J. Burns, and Harry T. Sandlin scoring one each. Ground forces also downed a North Korean aircraft during a subsequent attack. MacArthur subsequently authorized Stratemeyer to launch strikes into North Korea to destroy North Korean airfields and establish air superiority for the US forces.

The 8th Tactical Reconnaissance Squadron sent aircraft to scout all of North Korea's airfields. By the afternoon, the aircraft had not completed their scouting missions, but a bombing mission was nonetheless ordered against Heijo. At 16:15, 18 B-26 Invaders of the 3rd Bombardment Group took off from airbases in Japan. These would be the first offensive action against North Korea. The aircraft arrived at the airfield just after dark. There they found a substantial number of aircraft from North Korea's 1st Air Division parked on the tarmac, caught completely by surprise. The US subsequently placed their fragmentation bombs along the hangar line, ramps, and revetment areas. In the confusion, the North Koreans were only able to get one aircraft off the ground to oppose the flight, a Yak-3 which was quickly shot down by Staff Sergeant Nyle S. Mickley, a gunner aboard one of the bombers. By the end of the raid, the US destroyed an estimated 25 North Korean aircraft on the ground and one in the air while suffering no losses.

==== Subsequent strikes ====
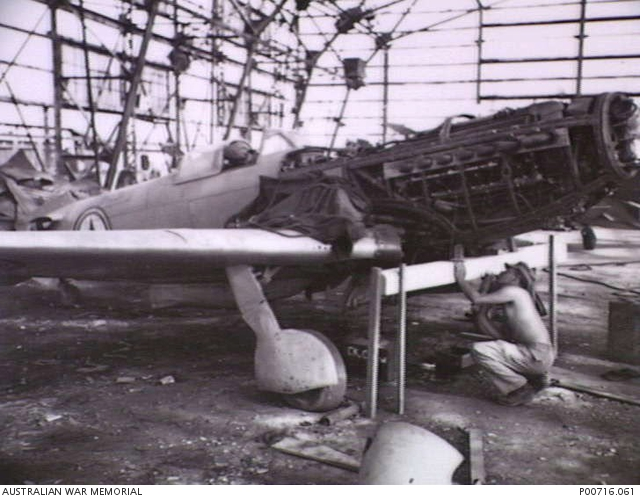
A North Korean Yak-9 inspected by Australian servicemen at Kimpo, 1950

With the successful strike on Heijo Airfield, the UN attempted more attacks against North Korean airfields. The 19th Bombardment Group launched a 2 July strike at Yonpo Airfield based on faulty intelligence that there were 65 aircraft there. Only 16 aircraft were in the field, none of which were damaged by the airstrike. In the meantime, Task Force 77 launched attacks on airfields in Pyongyang and Ojong-ni, downing two aircraft and damaging ten others in the 3–4 July attack. On 6 July a flight of four North Korean Yak-9s with ROKAF markings attacked Osan and damaged a telephone station, though for the rest of the week North Korean air forces stayed out of the sky.

When they returned to the fight a week later, the North Koreans employed guerrilla tactics with their aircraft, some continuing to use ROKAF markings and timing their strikes when UN patrols were out of the skies refueling. On 10 July, seven Yak-9s were hidden at the captured Kimpo airfield and used in strikes against UN positions at Cheongju. The next day they surprised and damaged several F-80s in the area. On 12 July the Yak-9s shot down a B-29 as it was bombing bridges in Seoul. Two more attacked a flight of F-80s flying over the battle at Chochiwon, damaging them. By the end of the day another UN L-4 had been shot down. On 15 July two more Yaks ambushed a flight of B-26s near Taejon, forcing one to land. Airstrikes against UN ground positions at Taejon persisted until 19 July. The North Koreans strafed ground positions and also dropped propaganda leaflets signed by US prisoners of war.

In counterattacks against the KPAF, the UN responded on 15 July with an attack on Kimpo, destroying two or three of the seven Yak-9s there and damaging the runway at the airfield. On 18 July Task Force 77 attacked Pyongyang and Pyongyang East Airfields, destroying 14 aircraft and damaging 13 more. The next day, Task Force 77 attacked Yonpo and destroyed 15 more aircraft there, and three more at Sondok. That day near Pyonggang, F-80s of the 8th Fighter-Bomber Group destroyed another 14 fighters and one bomber, and damaging seven others. On 20 July another strike by 14 B-29s destroyed the runways at Pyongyang and Onjong-ni. In the process of these strikes, the UN aircraft also shot down six North Korean aircraft opposing the attacks. By the end of the day on 20 July only 65 of the KPAF 1st Air Division's original aircraft were intact, and only 34 of them were operable.

North Korean airpower ceased to resist UN forces after 20 July, except for isolated engagements. On 5-6 August the final airstrikes on Pyongyang airfields destroyed another 18 combat aircraft, and 7 more were damaged. By this point the North Korean Air Force was considered to have been destroyed, losing 110 aircraft and only possessing 35, with only 18 operable. Through August and September, the North Koreans could only muster at most 16 sorties per day, most by isolated, single aircraft.

== Air-to-ground operations ==
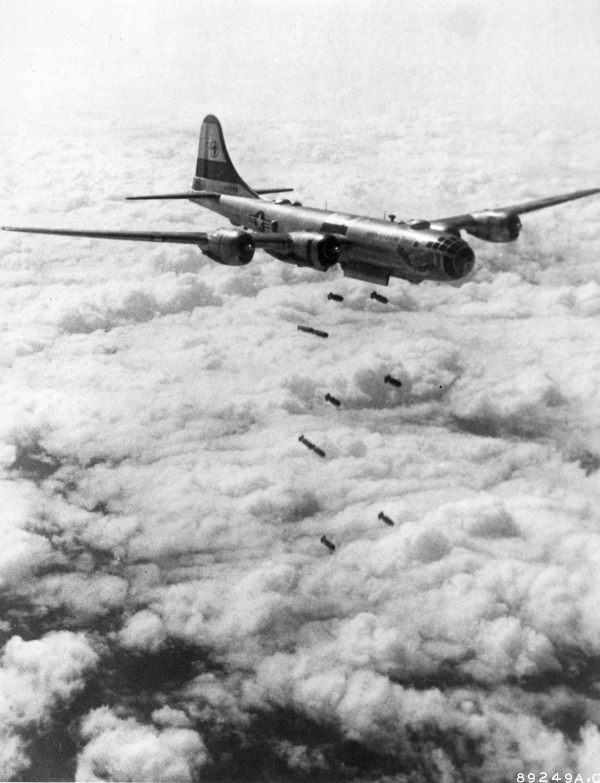
A B-29 Superfortress during a Korean War bombing run. B-29s conducted the majority of air interdiction raids against North Korean supply lines.

By 30 June, air assets were being rallied against ground targets as well as aircraft. That day the 19th Bombardment Group was being used to bomb targets along the Han River. Meanwhile, the 3rd Bombardment Group bombed targets around Seoul, seeking to slow the North Korean advance southward from the recently captured city. These assets also attacked North Korean convoys and troop movements along the roads to great effect. During these attacks North Korean aircraft rarely opposed the US aircraft, but in a few occasions Yak-9 flights appeared, and in one instance engaged a flight of F-80s from the 36th Fighter-Interceptor Squadron, allowing Lieutenants Charles A. Wurster and John B. Thomas to score a victory each. In spite of 25 bombing missions in Seoul, however, the North Korean troops were continuing their advance, forcing the US forces to abandon Suwon Airfield.

Beginning with the 5 July Battle of Osan, US troops began a continuous and unsuccessful ground campaign against the North Koreans, and many of the US air assets were used in close air support and airstrike roles to aid the faltering ground troops. From this point on, bombers mounted strategic bombing missions against military targets of all types supporting the North Korean ground troops, including ports, armor concentrations and supply stockpiles. A massive interdiction campaign ensued which would have implications for the upcoming conflicts. As more US Air Force, US Navy and US Marine Corps aviation assets arrived in the country, they increased their interdiction campaigns for several days, striking bridges and strategic areas though going mostly unthreatened by the North Korean Air Force. One F-80 was lost when it hit power lines during a bombing run.

The North Korean ground troops, unprepared for the aggressive use of US air power and untrained in countering it, continued to operate tightly packed convoys on open roads, allowing the US air forces to attack and ravage them repeatedly. From 7 to 9 July an estimated 197 trucks and 44 T-34 tanks were destroyed between Seoul and Pyongtaek. Though they subsequently won ground engagements at the Battle of Pyongtaek and Battle of Chonan, the North Korean ground troops were taking heavy losses from US air forces. On a few occasions, the UN airpower made mistakes, such as a 3 July bombing by No. 77 Squadron RAAF that hit a South Korean convoy near Suwon. At the same time, UN aircraft began flying at higher altitudes because combined small arms fire from North Korean ground targets was taking a heavier toll on UN aircraft. By mid July, these aircraft were flying up to 200 sorties per day to support UN ground troops, who by this point were losing the Battle of Chochiwon and the Battle of Taejon. By the start of the Battle of Pusan Perimeter, the air battle for South Korea had been won by the UN, and it used its air superiority decisively to its advantage during that battle. The UN would remain unopposed in the skies until Chinese forces entered the war in November 1950.

== Aftermath ==
In spite of the unsuccessful UN ground action from 25 June to 4 August, the air battle for South Korea was considered a crucial success for the UN forces. Able to attain air superiority over its outmatched enemy, the UN air forces were able to concentrate its efforts on attacking the North Koreans on the ground, and in the process inflicted significant casualties. This, in conjunction with bombing missions against North Korean armor, supplies and ports, greatly hampered North Korean efforts against the Pusan Perimeter, contributing to the eventual UN victory on the ground.

Stratemeyer later said the victory was "short and sweet" but attributed the victory more to the North Koreans' lack of a modern air force than to skill; he felt his pilots were just as inexperienced as the UN ground troops and could have faced similar defeats had they not outnumbered the North Koreans. The victory in the air battles also meant a large number of other advantages for the war during August and September: UN troops were able to move by day without fear of air attack, and UN naval ships could operate close to shore. North Korean troops were confined to night attacks to avoid UN aircraft, and much of its limited navy was also destroyed. By the end of the battle, the Eighth Army had more air support than General Omar Bradley's Twelfth United States Army Group in Europe during World War II.
