= Norman A. Ough =

Norman Arthur Ough (10 November 1898 – 3 August 1965) was a marine model maker whose models of Royal Navy warships are regarded as among the very finest of warship models.

== Family and early life ==
Ough was born in Leytonstone, London. His father, Arthur Ough (1863–1946), was an architect, surveyor and civil engineer. At the age of two Ough accompanied his parents to Hong Kong, where his father was employed as an architect for the University of Hong Kong and the Kowloon-Canton Railway, remaining there for four years. He was educated at Highfield School, Liphook, Hampshire and Bootham School in York.

== Later life ==
Ough was a conscientious objector during the First and Second World Wars. From the mid-1930s he lived in a flat at 98 Charing Cross Road, London. He never married and there is much anecdotal evidence that he lived a frugal, even impoverished, lifestyle in which model-making was a totally absorbing pursuit even to the extent of twice being hospitalised for failing to eat adequately due to concentration on his work.

== Models ==
Many of Ough's models are on display or held in store in museums including the Imperial War Museum, the National Maritime Museum and the Royal United Services Museum. One of his earlier models was of the battleship HMS Queen Elizabeth, which he made for Lord Howe, who presented it to Earl Beatty. There followed commissions for his models from many museums. At one time he was employed by Earl Mountbatten to make models of ships on which he had served, who remarked in a reply dated 20 July 1979 to a letter received from a visitor to his Broadlands estate "How interesting that the great model maker, Norman Ough, was a cousin of yours... I was told by the maker of the model of HMS Hampshire, also on display, that other model makers considered Norman Ough, the greatest master of his craft of this century."

Norman A. Ough's model of HMS Dorsetshire in No. 14 Dry Dock, Portsmouth, held by the National Maritime Museum at No. 1 Smithery, Chatham Historic Dockyard.

Models held by National Maritime Museum
Ship	Identification
Service Cutter (1:96 scale)†	Ref. No. SLR1819
HMS Queen Elizabeth (battleship)†	Ref. No. SLR1414
HMS Illustrious (aircraft carrier)†	Ref. No. SLR1544
HMS Warwick (destroyer)†	Ref. No. SLR1446
HMS Cygnet (destroyer)†	Ref. No. SLR1500
HMS Daring (destroyer)†	Ref. No. SLR1504
HMS Barfleur (destroyer)†	Ref. No. SLR1576
Models held by Imperial War Museum
HMS Revenge (battleship)†	Cat. No. MOD123
HMS Osiris (submarine)	Cat. No. MOD833
HMS Dartmoor (minesweeper)†	Cat. No. MOD840
HMS London (cruiser)	Cat. No. MOD563
HMS Dorsetshire (cruiser)† (depicted in No. 14 Dry Dock, Portsmouth)	Cat. No. MOD269
HMS Lion (battlecruiser)	Cat. No. MOD143
HMS Iron Duke (battleship)	Cat. No. MOD127
HMS Vindictive (cruiser)	Cat. No. MOD352
HMS Hawkins (cruiser)	Cat. No. MOD1637
HMS Penelope (cruiser)	Cat. No. MOD153
Jutland Fleet: 151 models depicting the composition of the British Grand Fleet at the Battle of Jutland in 1916, on 4 panels each 80 x 13 inches	Cat. No. MOD242
Model held by Fleet Air Arm Museum, RNAS Yeovilton
HMS Glorious (aircraft carrier) (originally made for the RUS Museum)	
Model held by Plymouth City Museum
HMS Hood (battlecruiser)	
Models in private collections
HMS Repulse (battlecruiser)	
HMS Nestor (destroyer)	

†As at September 2017, these models were located at the collections and research facility at No. 1 Smithery, Chatham Historic Dockyard.

In an article written for an edition of the magazine Model Maker about his model of HMS Dorsetshire in No. 14 Dry Dock, Portsmouth, which is widely regarded as among his very best, Ough writes about the benefit of his early training as an artist in achieving the model's realism:

It was here that the writer's training as a figure and landscape artist helped, for in a work of this kind, which is in the context of art as well as craft, the control of tone in the colour is critical, any very positive colour being 'off key'.

== Plans ==
In preparation for his models, Ough drew meticulous plans of the ships, their weapons, fittings and boats, many of which are regarded as the most authoritative drawings of their subjects in existence. For years these plans were marketed through the David MacGregor Plans Service and after Ough's death in 1965 his plans became the sole property of David MacGregor. On MacGregor's death in 2003 the combined collection was bequeathed to the SS Great Britain Trust.

== Film Industry work ==
Ough was commissioned to construct models for effects in several films including Convoy (1940), Sailors Three (1940), Spare a Copper (1940), Ships with Wings (1941), The Big Blockade (1942), San Demetrio London (1943) and Scott of the Antarctic (1948).
