= Battle of Kimpo Airfield =

Part of Korean War

- Part of Korean War
Date	27 June 1950
Location	Over Seoul and Kimpo, South Korea
Result	United Nations victory

Belligerents
United States; United Nations	North Korea

Commanders and leaders
(United States) James W. Little	(North Korea) unknown

Units involved
(United States) 8th Fighter Wing	(North Korea) 1st Air Division

Strength
5 F-82 Twin Mustangs; 4 F-80C Shooting Stars	8 Ilyushin Il-10s; 5 Yakovlev Yak-9s

Casualties and losses
several aircraft damaged, one South Korean T-6 Texan destroyed on the ground	7 aircraft destroyed

The Battle of Kimpo Airfield was the first aerial battle of the Korean War occurring on 27 June 1950 over Kimpo Airfield. The battle, between aircraft of the United States and North Korea, ended in a victory for the US Air Force after nine of its aircraft successfully shot down seven North Korean People's Air Force aircraft. It was the first direct engagement of the Air Battle of South Korea.

With the outbreak of the war two days earlier, the US forces were attempting to evacuate US civilians and diplomats from the city of Seoul, where a battle was ongoing between North and South Korean forces. Transport aircraft and ships, escorted by US fighter planes, were attempting to move civilians out of the country as fast as possible. During these missions on 27 June US forces were attacked by North Korean aircraft in two separate incidents in the Seoul area. Despite being outnumbered, the better-built American aircraft outmaneuvered the North Koreans, quickly shooting down half of the attacking force.

The actions were among few air-to-air battles in the early phase of the war as the North Koreans, realizing their aircraft were outmatched, quickly stopped using them aggressively against the United Nations Command. The battle also signaled a turning point in the Jet Age, as new, jet engine powered fighter aircraft had easily bested conventional fighters.

== Background ==
On the morning of 25 June ten divisions of the North Korean People's Army launched a full-scale invasion of the Republic of Korea. The force of 89,000 men moved in six columns, catching the Republic of Korea Army by surprise, resulting in a rout. The smaller South Korean army suffered from widespread lack of organization and equipment, and was unprepared for war. The numerically superior North Korean forces destroyed isolated resistance from the 38,000 South Korean soldiers on the front before it began moving steadily south.

To prevent South Korea's collapse, the United Nations Security Council voted to send military forces. The United States Seventh Fleet dispatched Task Force 77, led by the fleet carrier USS Valley Forge; the British Far East Fleet dispatched several ships, including HMS Triumph, to provide air and naval support. By 27 June the naval and air forces moving to Korea had authorization to attack North Korean targets with the goal of helping repel the North Korean invasion of the country.

With the US forces accepting the North Korean attack as an act of war, it became imperative to evacuate civilians and American diplomats from Korea, as the forces of the north and south were battling across the peninsula. By 27 June the South Koreans were losing the First Battle of Seoul. Most of South Korea's forces retreated in the face of the invasion. The North Koreans captured the city on 28 June, forcing the South Korean government and its shattered army to retreat further south.

In the meantime, US naval and air forces were evacuating US diplomats, military dependents, and civilians by ship and air transport, hoping to get American civilians out of the country "by any means." Civilians were being gathered at Suwon Airfield and Kimpo Airfield in Seoul, before moving to Incheon and out of the country. These airlifts and convoys were being escorted by aircraft from the United States Far East Force, which was operating its aircraft from bases in Japan. The two Koreas had very small air forces of their own, with the North Koreans' 132 aircraft organized into the 1st Air Division. At the early phase in the war, these aircraft were used boldly to the North Koreans' advantage.

== Battle ==
=== First sortie ===
On the morning of 27 June a flight of five F-82 Twin Mustangs of the 68th Fighter Squadron and 339th Fighter Squadron, 8th Fighter Wing commanded by World War II flying ace Major James W. Little were escorting four C-54 Skymaster aircraft out of Kimpo. The four transports were unarmed and filled with civilians from the Seoul area, en route to Japan.

Around 12:00, a flight of five Korean People's Air Force (KPAF) Yakovlev Yak-9s appeared at an altitude of 10,000 feet (3,000 m). The North Korean aircraft were headed for Kimpo Airfield with the intention of attacking US transports. Spotting the transport aircraft, the five North Korean planes immediately descended on them and opened fire, scoring several hits. The North Koreans then opened fire on the five US fighters guarding the transport aircraft. Little ordered return fire and personally fired the first shot against the North Koreans.

The North Korean aircraft split off into two groups, with two climbing rapidly into the clouds and the remaining three descending. Two F-82s piloted by Lieutenant Charles B. Moran (tail number 46-357) and Lieutenant William G. Hudson (tail number 46-383) followed the ascending pair. The two North Korean aircraft maneuvered around Moran's aircraft and opened fire, damaging the tail of his plane. Hudson responded by attacking the lead plane, forcing it to ascend further. Hudson's shots struck the aircraft in the fuselage and right wing. The North Korean pilot subsequently bailed out of the aircraft, though the navigator remained in it and was killed when the aircraft crashed.

Moran, in the meantime, had stalled while attempting to avoid the second North Korean plane, and when his aircraft recovered he was able to quickly shoot down the second aircraft which had accelerated in front of his. Little then dove his aircraft to engage the three remaining aircraft, quickly shooting one down while attempting to assist Moran.

The US planes, which were faster and more maneuverable than the North Korean aircraft, easily outperformed them. Within several minutes, three victories were claimed; one each by Little, Hudson, and Moran. The remaining two North Korean planes immediately fled. The US aircraft, in the meantime, suffered damage from the dogfight though none was shot down. Fire broke out in Little's cockpit, but he rallied the other aircraft and continued to escort them to their destination in Japan.

Initial reports differed on who had made the first kill, which would be the first North Korean plane shot down by the United Nations forces in the war. Later research indicated Hudson had successfully shot down the first aircraft. The timing of Hudson and Moran's victories remains unclear, and it is possible each scored a victory within seconds of the other. For his determination in leading the flight, though, Little was awarded a Silver Star.

=== Second sortie ===
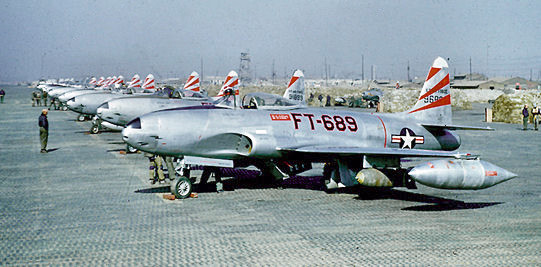
F-80Cs of the 8th Fighter-Bomber Group in Korea during the summer of 1950.

Word of the dogfight spread throughout the area, and an air alert was quickly posted over Seoul. In response, four F-80C Shooting Star aircraft of the 35th Fighter-Bomber Squadron under Captain Raymond E. Schillereff were posted in the skies over Seoul to counter any North Korean aircraft appearing in the area. The F-80s were jet engine-powered fighter aircraft which would easily defeat all of the aircraft known in the North Koreans' air force.

Early in the afternoon, the North Korean aircraft returned in larger numbers to attack the air transports. A flight of eight Ilyushin Il-10s appeared in the airspace between Seoul and Incheon, attempting to ambush transport aircraft while still on the ground at the airfields. The F-80s spotted the North Korean planes and engaged them. The North Korean aircraft split into two groups of four and quickly destroyed a Republic of Korea Air Force T-6 Texan parked on the tarmac at Kimpo.

==== First US jet-aircraft victory ====
The four F-80 aircraft were able to attack the North Koreans from a greater distance. With a minimal amount of maneuvering, the US aircraft rushed the North Korean formation and quickly shot four of them down; two by Lieutenant Robert E. Wayne, one by Lieutenant Robert H. Dewald, and one by Schillereff. These victories were the first for US Air Force jet-powered fighters in history.

The four remaining North Korean pilots immediately retreated to the north. The aircraft likely staged at Pyongyang Air Base and informed their superiors. No additional North Korean aircraft were spotted in the area for the rest of the day. By the end of the day the US aircraft from the three squadrons had flown 163 sorties.

== Aftermath ==
The battle was the first air-to-air dogfight between the United Nations and North Korea in the war. The North Koreans were unsuccessful in attempting to shoot down the air transports, and in the end none of the refugees in the evacuation was injured by the North Koreans. In all, the operation saw 2,001 people, including 1,527 US nationals, evacuated from the peninsula ahead of the wider war.

The battle was also considered a sign of the US's arrival into the Jet Age. The Il-10, which had been considered a high quality and effective conventional aircraft in World War II, had been easily outmatched by the F-80 and its jet engine. The engagement was a rare example of an air-to-air battle at the early phase of the war, and North Korean forces became much more cautious when deploying their aircraft in battle, knowing they were easily outnumbered and outmatched by UN forces. For the next several months, the UN forces enjoyed air supremacy, operating their air forces in support of ground combat virtually unopposed. The public perception of the F-80s, which had to this point been cautious, improved with news of the victories.
