= 802 Naval Air Squadron =

Inactive flying squadron of the Royal Navy's Fleet Air Arm

- Squadron badge
- Active: Royal Air Force; 1933–1939; Royal Navy: 1939–1940; 1940–1941; 1942; 1945; 1946–1947; 1947–1952; 1953–1955; 1956–1959
- Disbanded: 10 April 1959
- Country: United Kingdom
- Branch: Royal Navy
- Type: Single-seat fighter squadron
- Role: Carrier-based fighter squadron
- Part of: Fleet Air Arm
- Mottos: Prima Ferire (Latin for 'First to Strike')
- Aircraft: See Aircraft flown section for full list.
- Engagements: World War II: Norwegian campaign; Battle of the Atlantic; Arctic convoys of World War II; Operation Torch; Korean War: Air Battle of South Korea; Suez Crisis: Operation Musketeer
- Decorations: Boyd Trophy 1952
- Battle honours: Norway 1940; Atlantic 1941; Arctic 1942; North Africa 1942; Korea 1952

Commanders
- Notable commanders: Lieutenant Peter Carmichael, RN

Insignia
- Squadron Badge Description: In a blue field, Issuant from water, in base barry wavy white and blue, an arm embowed gold, the hand grasping an arrow white, winged gold
- Identification Markings: 561-576 (Nimrod); 548-549, 560 (Osprey); G6A+ (Sea Gladiator); single letters (Martlet); single letters (Seafire); to 131-145 (Seafire January 1946); 101-123 (Sea Fury); to 171-182 (Sea Fury February 1953); 171-182 (Sea Hawk November 1954); 131-142 (Sea Hawk from February 1956)
- Fin Carrier Codes: V (Seafire January 1946); Q:T (Sea Fury); to T:O (Sea Fury February 1953); J (Sea Hawk November 1954); O:Z:R:E (Sea Hawk from February 1956)

802 Naval Air Squadron (802 NAS), colloquially called 802 Squadron, is an inactive Fleet Air Arm (FAA) naval air squadron of the United Kingdom's Royal Navy (RN). It most recently operated the Hawker Sea Hawk FB.5 fighter-bomber aircraft between April 1957 and March 1959, based at RNAS Lossiemouth, Moray.

Established in April 1933, the squadron flew various biplane fighter aircraft and was initially deployed from HMS Glorious, but was ultimately lost when the carrier was sunk in June 1940. Reformed in November with Grumman Martlet, these aircraft were assigned to operate from HMS Audacity and HMS Argus during July and August 1941; the latter detachment, designated 802B Flight, was soon reassigned to HMS Victorious. The squadron regrouped aboard HMS Audacity, however, it faced its second loss at sea when HMS Audacity was sunk by U-751 in December 1941.

Reformed in February 1942 with Hawker Sea Hurricane, the squadron embarked in HMS Avenger in September for an Arctic convoy and later to offer air cover for a segment of the North African invasion force. However, the squadron was lost when the carrier was torpedoed by U-155 in November 1942. It did not reform until May 1945 and operated with Supermarine Seafire. During the Korean War of 1950 to 1953 the squadron flew Hawker Sea Fury where notably one of the squadron was credited with shooting down a MiG-15.

== History ==
=== Interwar period (1933-1939) ===
802 Squadron was formed on 3 April 1933 aboard HMS Glorious by the merger of two independent Royal Air Force naval units, 408 (Fleet Fighter) Flight and 409 (Fleet Fighter) Flight. By 1939, 802 Squadron was operating from HMS Grebe, the Royal Naval Air Station at Dekheila, Alexandria in Egypt, where, like all of the Royal Air Force's Fleet Air Arm squadrons, it was taken over by the Admiralty on 24 May 1939. Aircraft flown by the unit included the Hawker Nimrod I, Hawker Osprey I, Hawker Osprey III, and Hawker Osprey III Seaplane.

=== Second World War (1939-1945) ===
In April 1940 802 Squadron was serving aboard HMS Glorious with twelve Gloster Sea Gladiators when the carrier was recalled to participate in the defence of Norway. The squadron ceased to exist after HMS Glorious was sunk by the German battleships Scharnhorst and Gneisenau on 8 June 1940 during the defence of Norway.

Reformed from part of 804 Squadron on 21 November 1940 with Grumman Martlet Mk I fighter aircraft, the squadron's sub-flights embarked on the aircraft carriers HMS Audacity in July 1941, with B flight serving on HMS Argus in August. In the following month the whole squadron was involved in Gibraltar escort convoys from HMS Audacity from which it shot down four Focke-Wulf Fw 200's. The squadron was lost on 21 December 1941 when HMS Audacity was sunk by U-751.

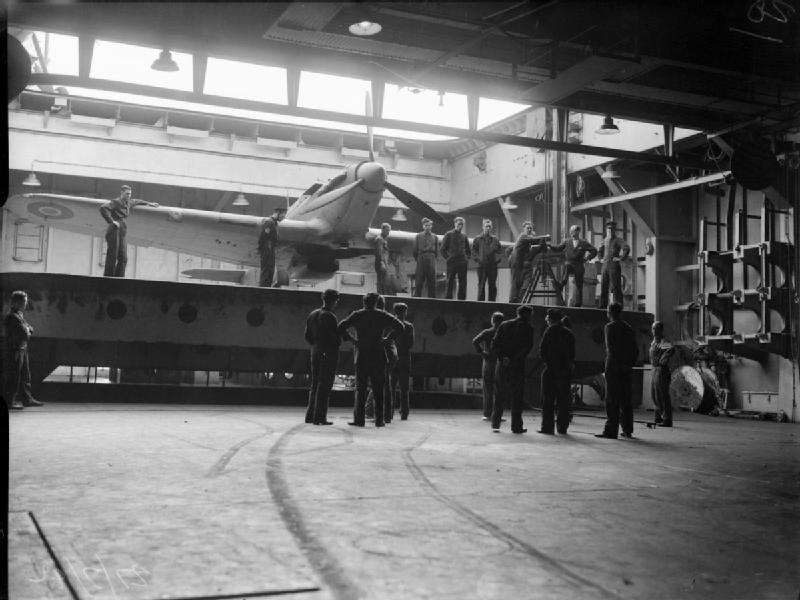
Inside the hangar of Avenger, showing the lift bringing down a Sea Hurricane of 802 Squadron

The squadron was re-formed at RNAS Yeovilton (HMS Heron), Somerset, in February 1942 with six Hawker Sea Hurricane Mk IB fighters, before embarking in the name ship of her class HMS Avenger for escorting the Arctic convoy PQ 18 in September during which time five enemy aircraft were shot down and 17 damaged in conjunction with 883 Squadron and subsequently the return convoy QP 14

The strength of 802 Squadron was later increased to nine aircraft. These were Hawker Sea Hurricane Mk IIBs. Subsequently, the squadron re-embarked on HMS Avenger in October, which was designated to the escort force of the 49-ship slow convoy KMS1 that departed from Loch Ewe on 22 October, heading towards Algiers. This convoy, along with others, constituted the elements of the invasion force for Operation Torch, the Allied landings in North Africa. The aircraft operating from HMS Avenger conducted strikes against coastal defences as well as the airfields located at Blida and Maison Blanche.

While returning to the UK the squadron was lost with the ship when HMS Avenger was torpedoed and sunk by U-155 on 15 November 1942.

=== Seafire (1945-1948) ===
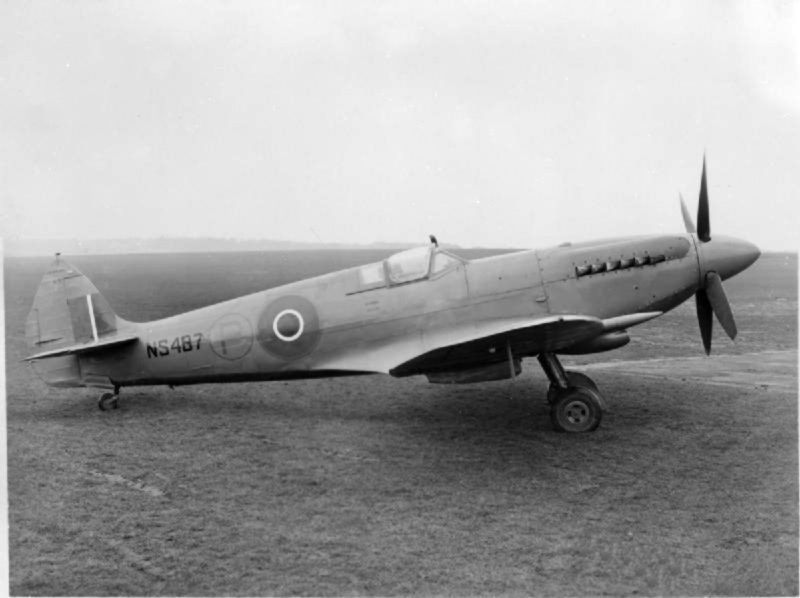
A Seafire F Mk.XV; an example of the type used by 802 Squadron

802 squadron lay dormant until May 1945 when it reformed at RNAS Arbroath (HMS Condor), Angus, as a single-seat fighter squadron with twelve Supermarine Seafire L Mk.IIIs and twelve F Mk.XVs. In August the L Mk.IIIs were replaced with twelve F Mk.XVs. By VJ day, the squadron had spent a short period embarked in HMS Queen, and had been anticipated to leave for the British Pacific Fleet with 9th Carrier Air Group. In December the squadron disbanded at RNAS Ayr (HMS Wagtail), South Ayrshire.

In January 1946, the squadron reformed with Supermarine Seafire F Mk.XVIIs and personnel set sail for the Far East in April without their aircraft, with the intention of relieving 1851 Naval Air Squadron aboard the Colossus-class aircraft carrier HMS Vengeance. However, upon receiving twelve new Supermarine Seafire F Mk.XVs, the squadron instead embarked in sister ship HMS Venerable. In March 1947, the ship returned home, and upon arrival in Plymouth, 802 Squadron disembarked to RNAS Eglinton (HMS Gannet) in County Londonderry and subsequently disbanded on 30 March.

When the squadron was re-established with twelve aircraft at RNAS Eglinton on 1 May 1947, the Seafire F.15s were once more the aircraft utilised, as a component of the 15th Carrier Air Group. In September, the Group embarked in HMS Vengeance and subsequently departed for the Mediterranean; however, 802 returned to the UK in March 1948.

=== Sea Fury (1948-1954) ===
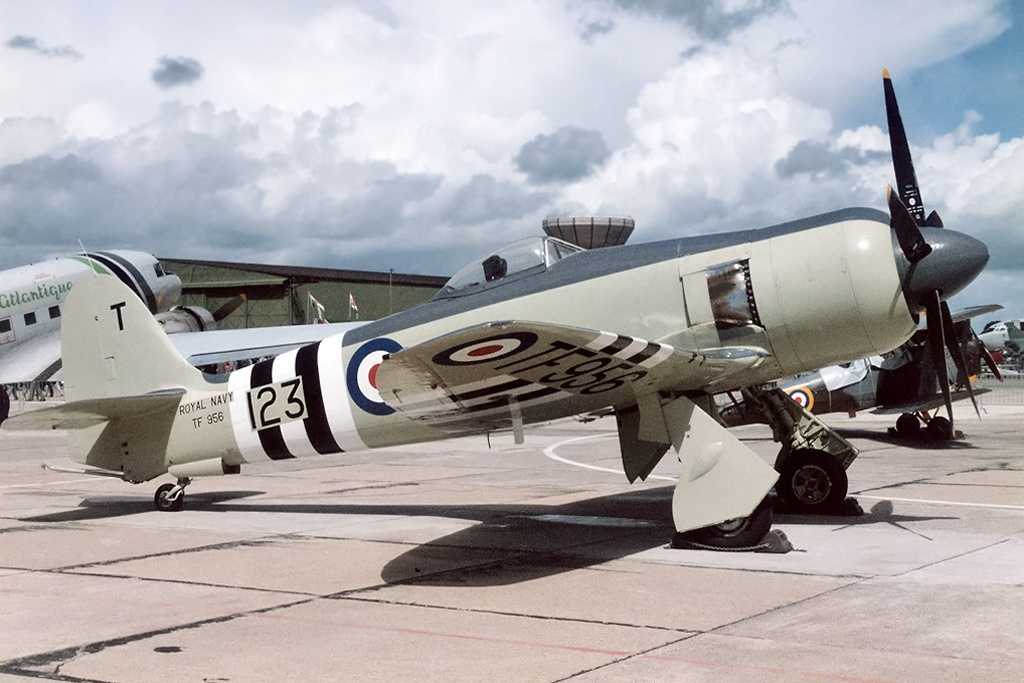
A Sea Fury FB.11 in 802 Squadron markings

The squadron re-equipped with thirteen Sea Fury F.10s. The Hawker Sea Fury represented the final piston-engine fighter utilised by the Fleet Air Arm in front-line squadrons, operating from 1947 to 1955. It was notable for being the first British naval aircraft to feature power-folding wings in regular service. The Sea Fury commenced its operational service in the late summer of 1947.

These were quickly replaced with FB. 11s and the squadron re-boarded HMS Vengeance in August for a trip to South Africa, where a disembarkation period featured an eight-day goodwill tour by seven Sea Furies throughout the nation. In February 1949, the Air Group carried out Arctic trials, subsequently spending the years 1950-51 primarily in the UK and Home waters. In September 1951, the squadron embarked in the Colossus-class light fleet carrier HMS Theseus.

==== Korean War (1950-1953) ====
During the Korean War 802 Squadron was assigned to the Colossus-class light fleet carrier HMS Ocean. In July, the newly appointed commanding officer did not return from a sortie just days after assuming command. In August, a Mikoyan-Gurevich MiG-15 kill was attributed to a pilot from the squadron. Lieutenant Peter "Hoagy" Carmichael was thought to have shot down a MiG-15 on 9 August 1952. Carmichael was recorded to have achieved this feat during a dogfight which started when a formation of four Sea Furys under his command were attacked by eight MiGs during a fighter-bomber mission over Chinnampo. It was later confirmed by squadron testimony and comparison against the squadron diary that the kill was achieved by Sub Lieutenant Brian 'Shmoo' Ellis, making the more junior 'Shmoo' one of only a handful of pilots of a piston engined propeller planes to have shot down a jet aircraft.

Approximately 4,000 sorties were conducted from 11 May to 31 October. In November, the squadron relocated the majority of its aircraft to a sister ship the aircraft carrier HMS Glory or to RNAS Sembawang (HMS Simbang), Singapore, subsequently moving to HMS Theseus at Malta, where it was disbanded upon reaching RNAS Lee-on-Solent (HMS Daedalus), Hampshire, in December. It jointly received the Boyd Trophy with 825 Naval Air Squadron for its operations in Korea throughout 1952.

==== Post Korean War ====
In February 1953, 802 Squadron was re-established with twelve Sea Fury FB.11s at RNAS Arbroath, subsequently embarking its aircraft aboard HMS Theseus in April. Following the squadrons participation in the Coronation Review of the Fleet flypast, it re-embarked for a cruise in the Mediterranean before returning to the United Kingdom.

=== Sea Hawk (1954-1959) ===
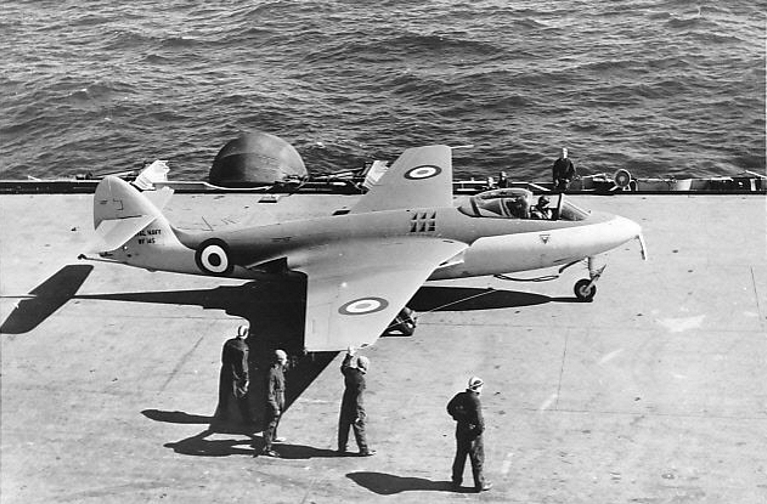
A Sea Hawk F1 on Eagle; an example of the type used by 802 Squadron

In February 1954, 802 Naval Air Squadron transitioned to the Sea Hawk F1 at RNAS Lossiemouth (HMS Fulmar), Moray. The inaugural production Hawker Sea Hawk took to the skies in November 1951, and it was integrated into FAA squadrons in 1953, replacing the Supermarine Attacker jet fighter and the Hawker Sea Fury piston-engined fighter. Similar to other FAA Sea Hawk units during that period, the squadron utilised later variants of the Sea Hawk as they were made available, culminating in the FGA 4 fighter/ground attack variant by the time it set sail on the Audacious-class aircraft carrier HMS Eagle for the Mediterranean, in May 1955. However, 802 Squadron disbanded in November of that year.

==== Suez Crisis (1956) ====
By the time of the Suez Crisis, 802 Squadron had already reformed at RNAS Lossiemouth and was equipped with Sea Hawk FB 3 fighter-bombers, one of these aircraft lost the front of a drop tank to ground fire while the squadron was embarked aboard the Centaur-class light fleet carrier HMS Albion in September 1956. In November, during Operation Musketeer, assaults were conducted on airfields, followed by attacks on artillery positions primarily located in the Port Said region.

==== Post Suez ====
802 Squadron re-equipped with Sea Hawk FB 5 fighter-bombers before transferring to the Audacious-class aircraft carrier HMS Ark Royal in May 1957. Following a trip to the United States, which included cross-operations with the United States Navy's aircraft carrier USS Saratoga, 802 Squadron completed two tours in the Mediterranean, the second of these starting in September 1958 aboard HMS Eagle and ending with the disbandment of 802 Squadron at RNAS Lossiemouth on 10 April 1959.

Plans to reform 802 Squadron at Yeovilton in 1979 with five British Aerospace Sea Harriers failed to materialise.

== Aircraft flown ==
The squadron has flown a number of different aircraft types, including:

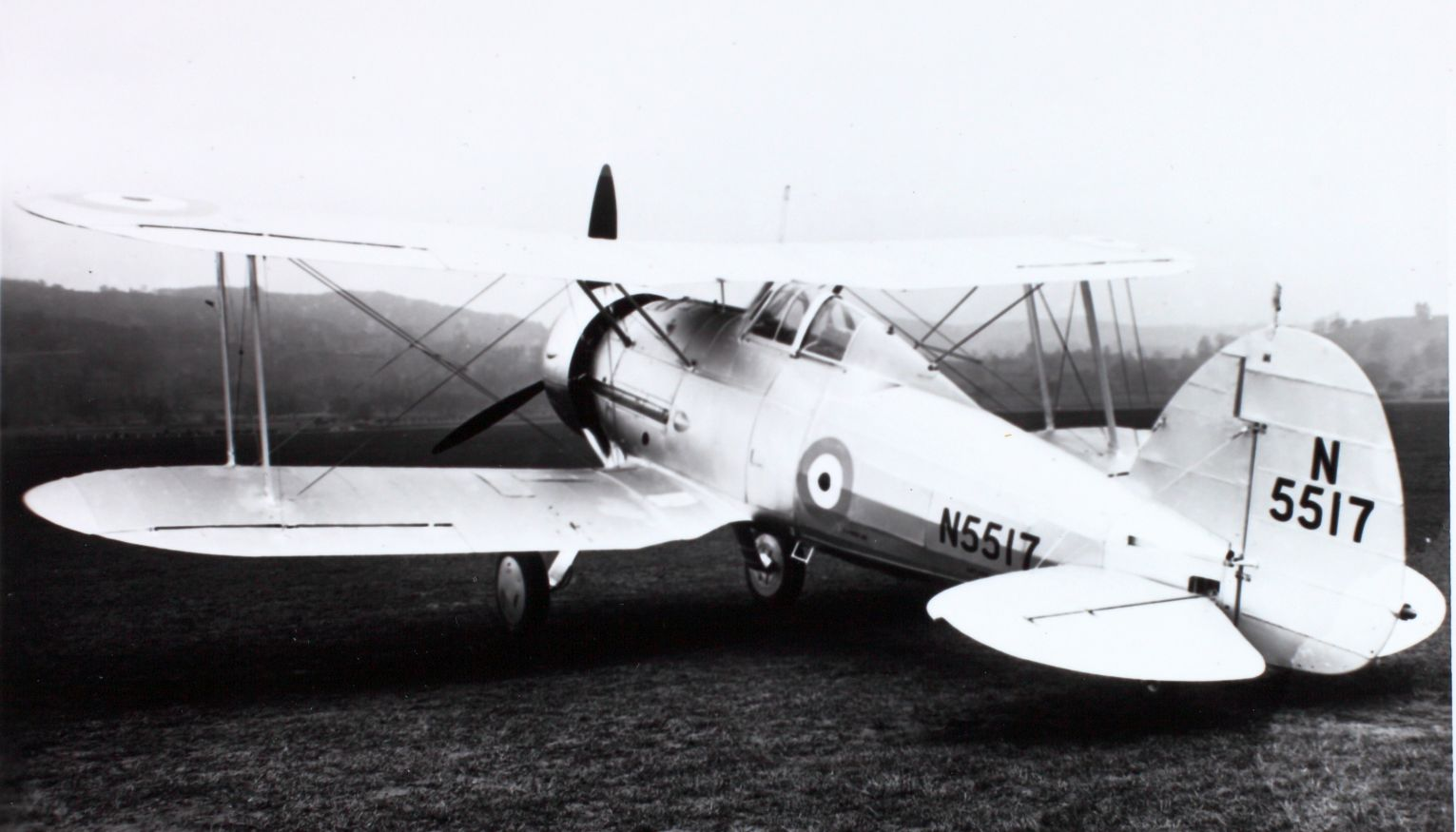
Sea Gladiator

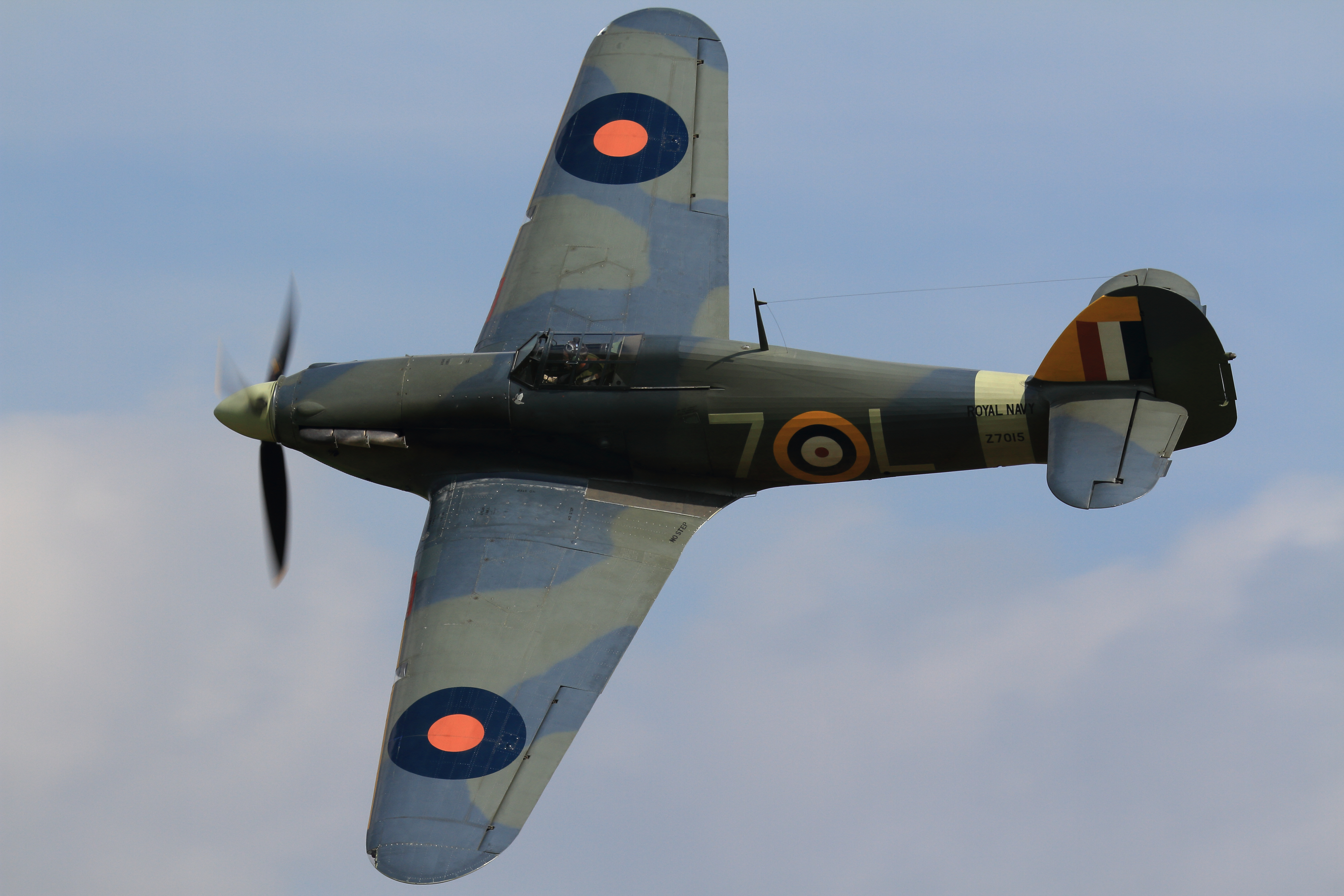
Sea Hurricane Mk 1B

- Hawker Nimrod I fighter aircraft (April 1933 - May 1939)
- Hawker Nimrod II fighter aircraft (April 1933 - May 1939)
- Hawker Osprey fighter aircraft (April 1933 - May 1939)
- Gloster Sea Gladiator fighter aircraft (May 1939 - June 1940)
- Grumman Martlet Mk I fighter aircraft (November 1940 - December 1941)
- Hawker Hurricane Mk.I fighter aircraft (5 - June 1941)
- Grumman Martlet Mk III fighter aircraft (June - December 1941)
- Hawker Sea Hurricane Mk IB fighter aircraft (February - September 1942)
- Hawker Sea Hurricane MK IIB fighter aircraft (September - November 1942)
- Supermarine Seafire F Mk.XV fighter aircraft (May - December 1945, May 1946 - March 1947)
- Supermarine Seafire L Mk.III fighter aircraft (May - August 1945)
- Supermarine Seafire F Mk.XVII fighter aircraft (January - April 1946, May 1947 - March 1948)
- Hawker Sea Fury F.10 fighter aircraft (April - June 1948)
- Hawker Sea Fury FB.11 fighter-bomber (May 1948 - November 1952, February 1953 - March 1954)
- Hawker Sea Fury T.20 two-seat training aircraft (February 1953 - February 1954)
- Hawker Sea Hawk F.1 jet fighter aircraft (February - April 1954)
- Hawker Sea Hawk F.2 jet fighter aircraft (May 1954 - July 1955)
- Hawker Sea Hawk FGA.4 fighter/ground attack aircraft (November 1954 - November 1955)
- Hawker Sea Hawk FB.3 fighter-bomber (February 1956 - July 1957)
- Hawker Sea Hawk FB.5 fighter-bomber (April 1957 - March 1959)

== Battle honours ==
The battle honours awarded to 802 Naval Air Squadron are:

- Norway 1940
- Atlantic 1941
- Arctic 1942
- North Africa 1942
- Korea 1952

== Assignments ==
802 Naval Air Squadron was assigned as needed to form part of a number of larger units:

- 15th Carrier Air Group (June 1946 - March 1947, May 1947 - April 1950, September 1950 - January 1952)
- 17th Carrier Air Group (March - December 1952)

== Commanding officers ==
List of commanding officers of 802 Naval Air Squadron:

1933 - 1940

- Lieutenant Commander E.M.C. Abel Smith, RN, (Squadron Leader RAF), from 3 April 1933
- Squadron Leader W.E. Swann, RAF, from 10 June 1933
- Lieutenant Commander J.B. Heath, RN, (Flight Lieutenant RAF), from 13 May 1934
- Squadron Leader R.H. Hanmer, MC, RAF, from 15 January 1935
- Squadron Leader F.E. Bond, RAF, from 11 June 1936
- Lieutenant Commander J.P.G. Bryant, RN, (Squadron Leader RAF), from 11 January 1938
- Lieutenant J.F. Marmont, RN, from 1 March 1940 (KiA 8 June 1940)
- disbanded - 8 June 1940

1940 - 1941

- Lieutenant Commander J.M. Wintour, RN, from 21 November 1940 (KiA 8 November 1941)
- Lieutenant D.C.E.F. Gibson, DSC, RN, from 11 November 1941
- disbanded - 21 December 1941

1942

- Lieutenant D.C.E.F. Gibson, DSC, RN, from 1 February 1942
- Lieutenant Commander E.W.T. Taylour, DSC, RN, from 7 April 1942 (KiA 13 September 1942)
- Lieutenant D.P.Z. Cox, RN, from 26 September 1942 (KiA 15 November 1942)
- disbanded - 15 November 1942

1945

- Lieutenant Commander R.E. Hargreaves, DSC, RN, from 1 May 1945
- Lieutenant(A) W.A. Wallace, RNVR, from 1 November 1945
- disbanded - 10 December 1945

1946 - 1947

- Lieutenant Commander(A) B.H. Harriss, RN, from 10 January 1946
- disbanded - 30 March 1947

1947 - 1952

- Lieutenant Commander M. Hordern, DSC, RN, from 18 May 1947
- Lieutenant Commander R.W. Kearsley, RN, 22 December 1948
- Lieutenant Commander P.H. Moss, RN, from 30 March 1950
- Lieutenant Commander J.M. Henry, RN, from 21 August 1950
- Lieutenant Commander S.F.F. Shotton, DSC, RN, from 21 January 1951
- Lieutenant Commander D.A. Dick, DSC, RN, from 13 July 1952 (KiA 24 July 1952)
- Lieutenant P. Carmichael, RN, from 25 July 1952
- Lieutenant Commander P.H. London, DSC, RN, from 24 August 1952
- disbanded - 17 December 1952

1953 - 1955

- Lieutenant Commander D.M. Steer, RN, from 2 February 1953
- Lieutenant Commander I.H.F. Martin, DSC, RN, from 19 August 1954
- disbanded - 22 November 1955

1956 - 1959

- Lieutenant Commander R.L. Eveleigh, DSC, RN, from 6 February 1956
- Lieutenant Commander P.E. Atterton, RN, from 22 July 1957
- Lieutenant Commander W.D. Lang, RN, from 8 December 1958
- disbanded - 10 April 1959

Note: Abbreviation (A) signifies Air Branch of the RN or RNVR.

== See also ==
- Eric Brown (pilot) - Royal Navy Captain and test pilot and former 802 Squadron pilot
- Operation Juno - the loss of the Royal Navy aircraft carrier HMS Glorious with 802 Squadron emabrked
- Exercise Strikeback
