= HMS Condor =

Two vessels and one shore establishment of the Royal Navy have been named HMS Condor after the condor, the largest flying land birds in the Western Hemisphere.

- HMS Condor (1876), a Condor-class gunboat launched in 1876 and sold in 1889. She took part in the bombardment of Alexandria during the 1882 Urabi Revolt in Egypt, while under the command of Lord Charles Beresford.
- HMS Condor (1898), a Condor-class sloop launched in 1898 and lost off Cape Flattery on the North-West corner of the Continental United States during a storm in December 1901 whilst travelling from Esquimalt in Canada to Honolulu.
- HMS Condor (shore establishment) A former Royal Naval Air Station, HMS Condor at Arbroath, near Dundee became RM Condor in 1971. It is the base for 45 Commando, Royal Marines.
- HMS Condor II (shore establishment) A former Royal Naval Air Station, HMS Condor II at Dundee, known as RNAS Dundee between 1940 and 1944.
