= Manchón =

Manchón is a surname. Notable people with the surname include:

- Beatriz Manchón (born 1976), Spanish sprint canoeist
- Blanca Manchón (born 1987), Spanish windsurfer
- Eduardo Manchón (1930–2010), Spanish footballer

== See also ==
- Manchón-Guamuchal, a nature reserve in Guatemala
