= HMS Glorious =

Royal Navy aircraft carrier sunk in WWII

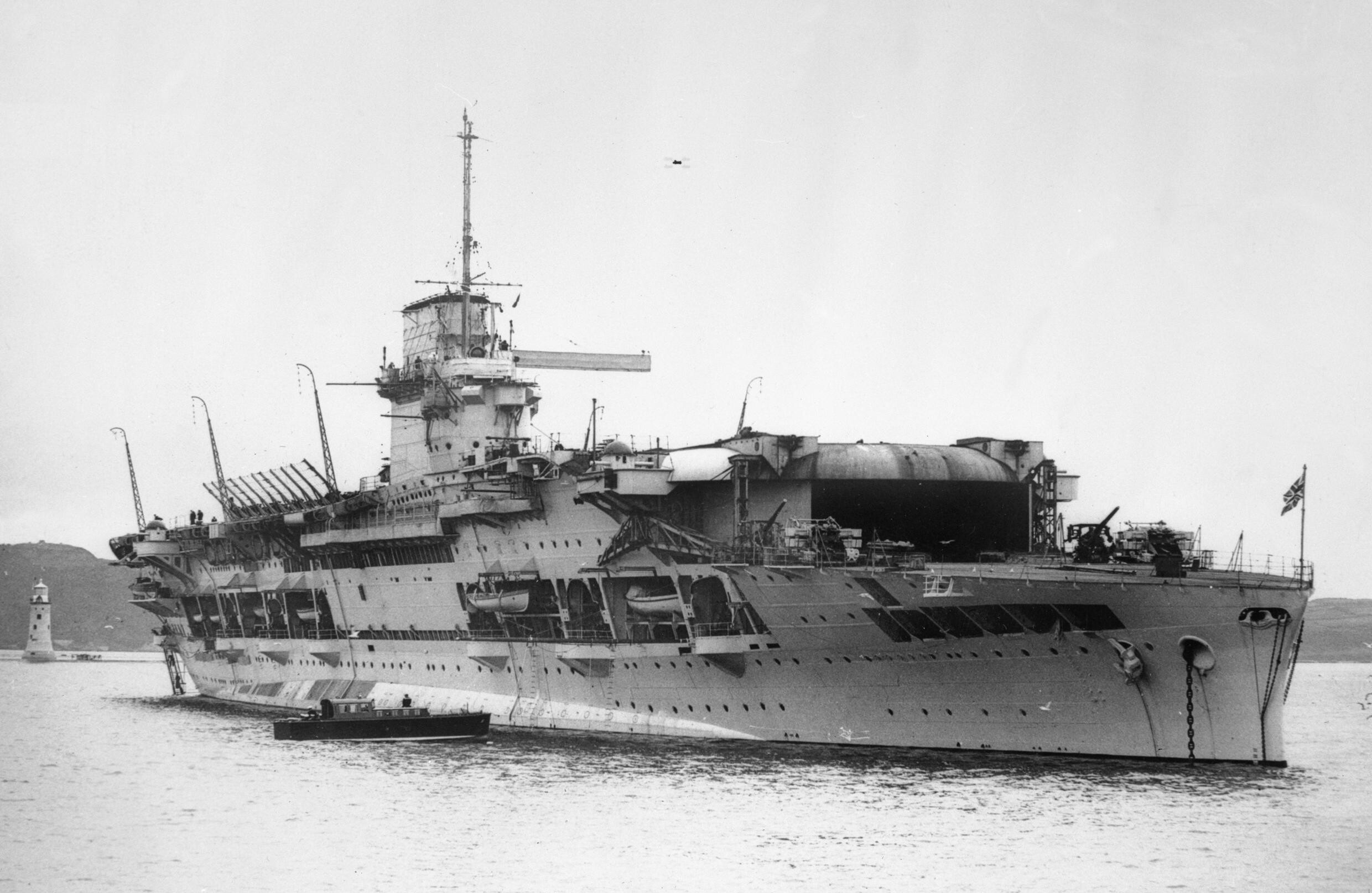
- Glorious after her conversion into an aircraft carrier

History

United Kingdom
- Name: Glorious
- Ordered: 14 March 1915
- Builder: Harland and Wolff, Belfast
- Cost: £1,967,223
- Yard number: 482–484
- Laid down: 1 May 1915
- Launched: 20 April 1916
- Completed: 31 December 1916
- Commissioned: January 1917
- Reclassified: Converted to aircraft carrier, 1924–1930
- Identification: Pennant number: 77
- Nickname(s): Laborious
- Fate: Sunk by Scharnhorst and Gneisenau, 8 June 1940

General characteristics (as battlecruiser)
- Class & type: Courageous-class battlecruiser
- Displacement: 19,180 long tons (19,488 t) normal; 22,360 long tons (22,719 t) (deep load)
- Length: 786 ft 9 in (239.8 m) (o/a)
- Beam: 81 ft (24.7 m)
- Draught: 25 ft 10 in (7.9 m)
- Installed power: 18 Yarrow boilers; 90,000 shp (67,113 kW)
- Propulsion: 4 shafts; 4 geared steam turbines
- Speed: 32 knots (59 km/h; 37 mph)
- Range: 6,000 nmi (11,000 km; 6,900 mi) at 20 knots (37 km/h; 23 mph)
- Complement: 842 officers and men
- Armament: 2 × twin 15 in (381 mm) guns; 6 × triple 4 in (102 mm) guns; 2 × single 3 in (76 mm) AA guns; 2 × 21 in (533 mm) torpedo tubes
- Armour: Belt: 2–3 in (51–76 mm); Decks: .75–3 in (19–76 mm); Barbettes: 3–7 in (76–178 mm); Turrets: 7–9 in (178–229 mm); Conning tower: 10 in (254 mm)

General characteristics (as aircraft carrier)
- Class & type: Courageous-class aircraft carrier
- Displacement: 24,970 long tons (25,370 t) (normal); 27,419 long tons (27,859 t) (deep load)
- Length: 735 ft 1.5 in (224.1 m) (p/p); 786 ft 9 in (239.8 m) (o/a)
- Beam: 90 ft 6 in (27.6 m) (at waterline)
- Draught: 27.75 ft (8.5 m)
- Speed: 30 knots (56 km/h; 35 mph)
- Range: 5,860 nmi (10,850 km; 6,740 mi) at 16 knots (30 km/h; 18 mph)
- Complement: 793 + 490 air group (1931)
- Armament: 16 × single 4.7 in (120 mm) DP guns
- Armour: Belt: 2–3 in (51–76 mm); Decks: .75–1 in (19–25 mm); Bulkhead: 2–3 in (51–76 mm)
- Aircraft carried: 48

HMS Glorious was the second of the three Courageous-class battlecruisers built for the Royal Navy during the First World War. Designed to support the Baltic Project championed by the First Sea Lord, Lord Fisher, they were relatively lightly armed and armoured. Glorious was completed in late 1916 and spent the war patrolling the North Sea. She participated in the Second Battle of Heligoland Bight in November 1917 and was present when the German High Seas Fleet surrendered a year later.

Glorious was paid off after the war, but was rebuilt as an aircraft carrier during the late 1920s. She could carry 30 per cent more aircraft than her half-sister Furious which had a similar tonnage. After re-commissioning in 1930, she spent most of her career operating in the Mediterranean Sea. After the start of the Second World War in 1939, Glorious spent the rest of the year hunting for the commerce-raiding German cruiser Admiral Graf Spee in the Indian Ocean before returning to the Mediterranean. She was recalled home in April 1940 to support operations in Norway. While evacuating British aircraft from Norway in June, the ship was sunk by the German battleships Scharnhorst and Gneisenau in the North Sea with the loss of over 1,200 lives.

== Design and description ==
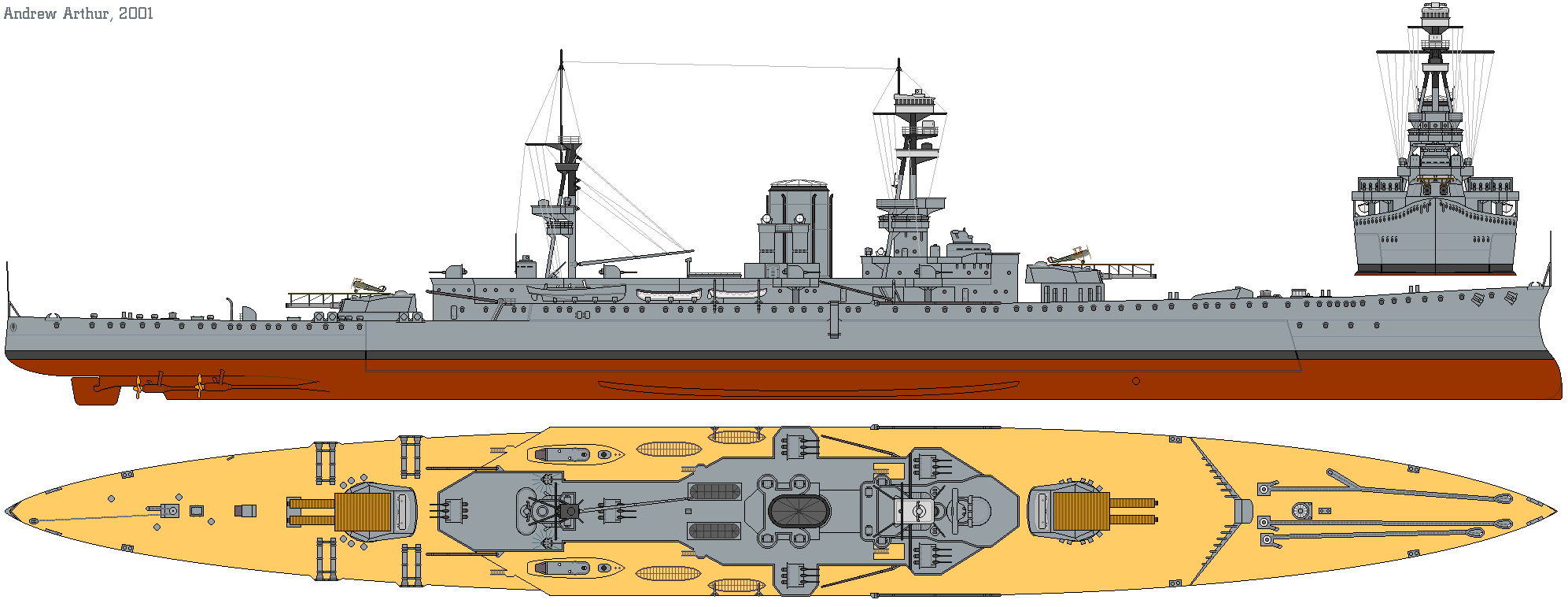
Three-view drawing as completed in 1917

During the First World War, Admiral Fisher was prevented from ordering an improved version of the preceding Renown-class battlecruisers by a wartime restriction that banned construction of ships larger than light cruisers. To obtain ships suitable for traditional battlecruiser roles, such as scouting for fleets and hunting enemy raiders, he settled on a design with the minimal armour of a light cruiser and the armament of a battlecruiser. He justified their existence by claiming he needed fast, shallow-draught ships for his Baltic Project, a plan to invade Germany via its Baltic coast.

Glorious had an overall length of 786 feet 9 inches (239.8 m), a beam of 81 feet (24.7 m), and a draught of 25 feet 10 inches (7.9 m) at deep load. She displaced 19,180 long tons (19,490 t) at load and 22,560 long tons (22,922 t) at deep load. Glorious and her sisters were the first large warships in the Royal Navy to have geared steam turbines. The Parsons turbines were powered by eighteen Yarrow boilers. During the ship's abbreviated sea trials, she reached 31.42 knots (58.19 km/h; 36.16 mph). The ship was designed to normally carry 750 long tons (760 t) of fuel oil, but could carry a maximum of 3,160 long tons (3,210 t). At full capacity, she could steam for an estimated 6,000 nautical miles (11,110 km; 6,900 mi) at 20 knots (37 km/h; 23 mph).

Glorious carried four BL 15-inch (381 mm) Mark I guns in two twin-gun turrets, one each fore ('A') and aft ('Y'). Her secondary armament was 18 BL 4-inch (102 mm) Mark IX guns mounted in six triple mounts. These mounts had the three breeches too close together and the 23 loaders tended to interfere with one another. This negated the mount's intended high rate of fire against torpedo boats and other smaller craft. A pair of QF 3-inch (76 mm) 20 cwt (Note: "Cwt" is the abbreviation for hundredweight, 30 cwt referring to the weight of the gun.) anti-aircraft guns were fitted abreast of the mainmast on Glorious. She mounted two submerged tubes for 21-inch torpedoes and 10 torpedoes were carried.

== First World War ==
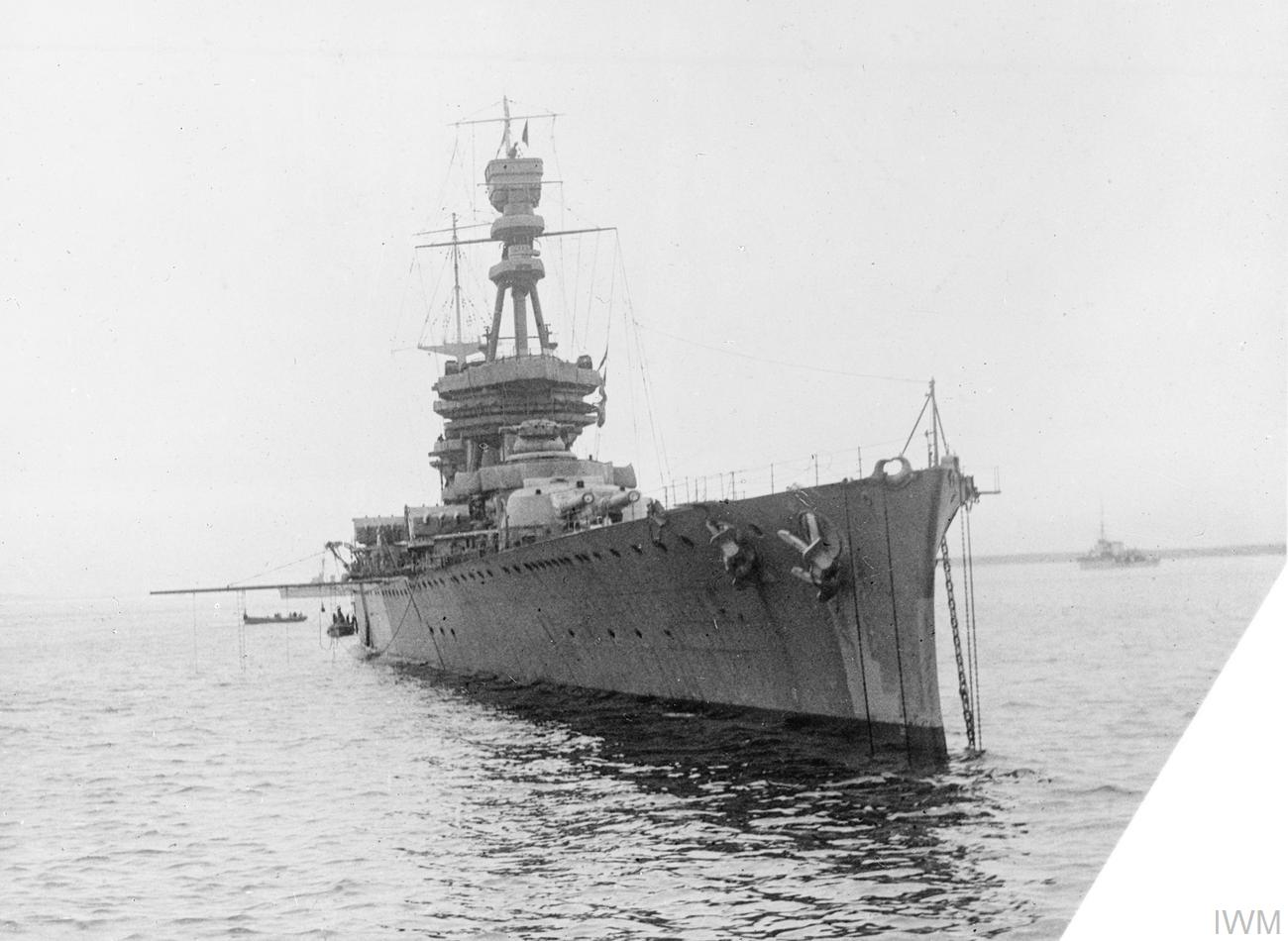
Glorious at anchor during the First World War

Glorious' keel was laid down on 1 May 1915 by Harland and Wolff at their Belfast shipyard. She was launched on 20 April 1916 and completed on 14 October at a cost of £1,967,223. During her sea trials the following month, her sister Courageous sustained structural damage while running at full speed in a rough head sea and had the damaged areas stiffened shortly afterwards to prevent a recurrence. Glorious did not suffer similar damage and did not receive her stiffening until 1918. Upon commissioning, Courageous served with the 3rd Light Cruiser Squadron of the Grand Fleet. After most of the 1st Cruiser Squadron was sunk at the Battle of Jutland, the squadron was re-formed with Courageous and Glorious. Glorious received six twin-tube torpedo mounts in mid-1917: one mount on each side of the mainmast on the upper deck and two mounts on each side of 'Y' turret on the quarterdeck.

On 16 October 1917 the Admiralty received word of German ship movements, possibly indicating some sort of raid. Admiral Beatty, commander of the Grand Fleet, ordered most of his light cruisers and destroyers to sea in an effort to locate the enemy ships. Courageous and Glorious were not initially ordered to sea, but were sent to reinforce the 2nd Light Cruiser Squadron patrolling the central part of the North Sea later that day. Two German Brummer-class light cruisers slipped through the gaps in the British patrols and destroyed a convoy bound for Norway during the morning of 17 October, but the British warships received no word of the engagement until that afternoon. The 1st Cruiser Squadron was ordered to intercept, but was unsuccessful as the German cruisers were faster than expected.

=== Second Battle of Heligoland Bight ===
Throughout 1917 the Admiralty was becoming more concerned about German efforts to sweep paths through the British-laid minefields intended to restrict the actions of the High Seas Fleet and German submarines. A preliminary raid on German minesweeping forces on 31 October by light forces destroyed 10 small ships and the Admiralty decided on a larger operation to destroy the minesweepers and their light cruiser escorts. Based on intelligence reports, the Admiralty allocated the 1st Cruiser Squadron on 17 November 1917, with cover provided by the reinforced 1st Battlecruiser Squadron and distant cover by the battleships of the 1st Battle Squadron.

The German ships, four light cruisers of II Scouting Force, eight destroyers, three divisions of minesweepers, eight sperrbrecher (cork-filled trawlers) and two trawlers to mark the swept route, were spotted at 7:30 am, (Note: The times used in this section are in UTC, which is one hour behind CET, which is often used in German works.) silhouetted by the rising sun. Courageous and the light cruiser Cardiff opened fire with their forward guns seven minutes later. The Germans responded by laying a smoke screen and this made spotting targets very difficult. The British continued in pursuit, but lost track of most of the smaller ships in the smoke and concentrated fire on the light cruisers as opportunity permitted. One 15-inch shell hit a gun shield of SMS Pillau, but it did not affect her speed. At 8:33 the left-hand gun in Glorious's forward turret was wrecked when a shell detonated inside the gun barrel. At 9:30 the 1st Cruiser Squadron broke off their pursuit to avoid a minefield marked on their maps. The ships turned south, playing no further role in the battle. Glorious required five days of repairs to fix damage caused by premature detonation and her own muzzle blast. She fired 57 15-inch and 213 four-inch shells during the engagement.

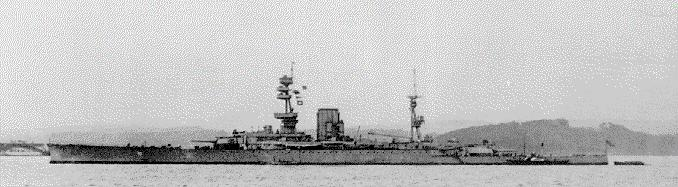
Glorious in 1918

Glorious received flying-off platforms on top of her turrets in 1918. A Sopwith Camel was carried on the rear turret and a Sopwith 1½ Strutter on the forward turret. On 5 November 1918, Glorious was anchored off Burntisland in the Firth of Forth together with the seaplane tender Campania and the battleship Royal Oak when a sudden Force 10 squall caused Campania to drag her anchor and collide first with Royal Oak and then with Glorious. Both Royal Oak and Glorious suffered only minor damage, but Campania was holed by her collision with Royal Oak. Campania′s engine rooms flooded, and she settled by the stern and sank five hours later without loss of life.

Glorious was present at the surrender of the German High Seas Fleet on 21 November 1918. She was placed in reserve at Rosyth, Scotland, on 1 February 1919 and served as a turret drill ship, being also flagship of the rear-admiral commanding the Devonport Reserve between 1921 and 1922.

== Conversion ==
The Washington Naval Treaty of 1922 limited the amount of capital ship tonnage and the Royal Navy was forced to scrap many of its older battleships and battlecruisers. However up to 66,000 long tons (67,059 t) of existing ships could be converted into aircraft carriers, for which the Courageous-class ships' large hulls and high speeds made them ideal candidates. Glorious began her conversion at Rosyth in 1924, and was towed to Devonport where she was completed on 24 February 1930. During the ship's post-conversion sea trials, she reached 29.47 knots (54.58 km/h; 33.91 mph). Her 15-inch turrets were placed into storage and later reused during the Second World War for Vanguard, the world's last battleship to be built.

Her new design improved on her half-sister Furious which lacked an island and a conventional funnel. All superstructure, guns, torpedo tubes, and fittings down to the main deck were removed. A two-storey hangar, each level 16 feet (4.9 m) high and 550 feet (167.6 m) long, was built on top of the remaining hull; the upper hangar level opened on to a short flight deck, below and forward of the main flight deck. The lower flying-off deck improved launch and recovery cycle flexibility until heavier fighters requiring longer takeoff rolls made the lower deck obsolete in the 1930s. Two 46-by-48-foot (14.0 m × 14.6 m) lifts were installed fore and aft in the flight deck. An island with the bridge, flying-control station, and funnel was added on the starboard side as islands had been found not to contribute significantly to turbulence. By 1939 the ship could carry 34,500 imperial gallons (157,000 L; 41,400 US gal) of petrol for her aircraft.

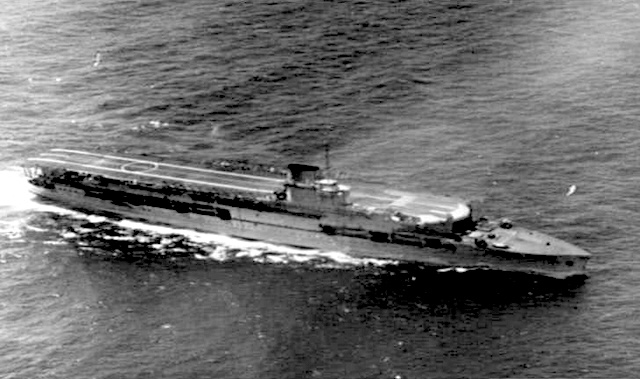
Aerial view of Glorious under way, 1936

Glorious received a dual-purpose armament of sixteen QF 4.7-inch (120 mm) Mark VIII guns in single mounts. One mount was on each side of the lower flight deck and a pair was on the quarterdeck. The remaining twelve mounts were distributed along the sides of the ship. During her 1935 refit, the ship received three octuple QF two-pounder (40 mm) "pom-pom" mounts, one on each side of the flying-off deck, forward of the 4.7-inch guns, and one behind the island on the flight deck. She also received a single quadruple mount for water-cooled 0.5 in (12.7 mm) Vickers machineguns for anti-aircraft use.

The ship recommissioned on 24 February 1930 for service with the Mediterranean Fleet, but was attached to the Home Fleet from March to June 1930. She relieved Courageous in the Mediterranean Fleet in June 1930 and remained there until October 1939. In a fog on 1 April 1931 Glorious rammed the French ocean liner Florida amidships while steaming at 16 knots (30 km/h; 18 mph). The impact crumpled 60 feet (18.3 m) of the flying-off deck and killed 1 seaman aboard Glorious and 24 passengers and crew aboard Florida. The ship was forced to put into Gibraltar for temporary repairs. She had to sail to Malta for permanent repairs which lasted until September 1931. Sometime in the early 1930s, transverse arresting gear was installed. She was refitted at Devonport from July 1934 to July 1935 where she received two hydraulic accelerators (catapults) on her upper flight deck, which was also extended to the rear, her quarterdeck was raised one deck and she received her multiple pom-pom mounts. Glorious participated in the Coronation Fleet Review at Spithead on 20 May 1937 for King George VI before returning to the Mediterranean.

=== Air group ===
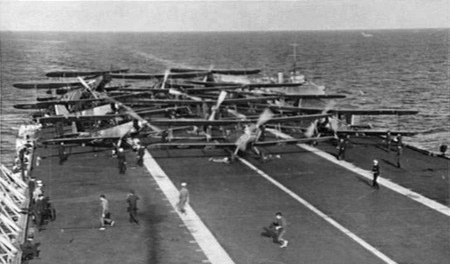
A squadron of Fairey Seals preparing for takeoff from Glorious, 1936

The ship could carry up to 48 aircraft; when first recommissioned, she carried Fairey Flycatcher fighters, Blackburn Dart and Blackburn Ripon torpedo bombers, and Fairey IIIF reconnaissance planes of the Fleet Air Arm. From 1933 until Glorious returned to the United Kingdom in April 1940, aside from a period when refitting in the mid-1930s, she carried 802 Squadron which flew a mixture of nine Hawker Nimrod and three Hawker Osprey fighters, until re-equipping with a dozen Gloster Sea Gladiators in May 1939. 812 and 823 Squadrons were embarked for reconnaissance and anti-ship attack missions. They flew the Blackburn Ripon, the Blackburn Baffin and the Fairey Swordfish torpedo bombers and as well as Fairey IIIF and Fairey Seal reconnaissance aircraft. When Glorious recommissioned after her refit in 1935, 825 Squadron was embarked, initially with Fairey IIIFs, but the squadron converted to Fairey Swordfish in May 1936.

== Second World War ==
Glorious served briefly with the Mediterranean Fleet for a time after the Second World War broke out. In October 1939, she moved through the Suez Canal to the Indian Ocean where she became part of Force J which was organised to hunt for the Admiral Graf Spee in the Indian Ocean. It was not successful and Glorious remained in the Indian Ocean until December when she returned to the Mediterranean.

=== Norwegian Campaign ===
She was recalled to the Home Fleet in April 1940 to provide air cover for British forces landing in Norway. Eighteen Gloster Gladiators of No. 263 Squadron RAF were flown aboard to be transferred to Norwegian airbases. Eleven Blackburn Skuas of 803 Squadron, plus eighteen Sea Gladiators from 802 and 804 Squadrons were also embarked. Glorious and Ark Royal arrived off central Norway on 24 April where 263 Squadron was flown off and their own aircraft attacked targets in and south of Trondheim before Glorious had to return to Scapa Flow late on 27 April to refuel and embark new aircraft. Glorious's Sea Gladiators provided air cover for the two carriers. They damaged one Heinkel He 111 bomber on a reconnaissance mission. Before departing she transferred four serviceable Skuas to Ark Royal. She returned on 1 May, but had been unable to load many new aircraft because of poor weather. Only a dozen Swordfish of 823 Squadron, three Skuas and one Blackburn Roc managed to be flown aboard. The task force was under heavy air attack by the Luftwaffe all day and was withdrawn that evening. One Junkers Ju 87 Stuka dive bomber was shot down after it dropped its bomb by the Sea Gladiators on patrol.

Glorious returned on 18 May with six Supermarine Walrus flying boats of 701 Squadron and 18 Hawker Hurricanes of No. 46 Squadron RAF. The latter aircraft had been loaded aboard by crane. The Walruses were quickly flown off to Harstad, but the airfield in Skånland was not yet ready for the Hurricanes and they were still aboard when Glorious returned to Scapa on 21 May. Glorious came back to the Narvik area on 26 May and the Hurricanes were quickly flown off.

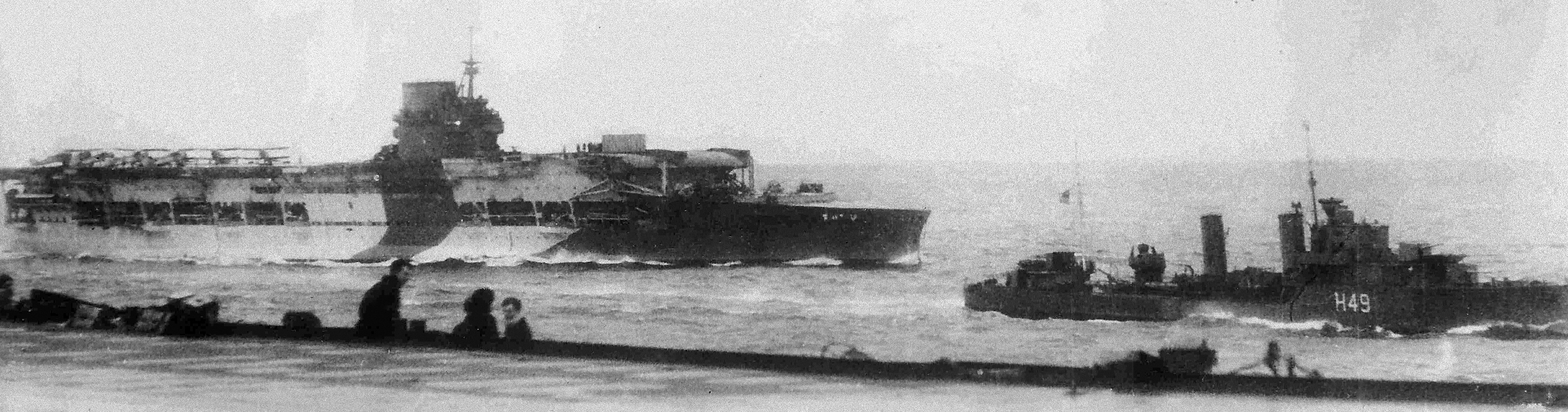
Glorious photographed in May 1940 from the deck of Ark Royal; the destroyer with her is Diana

Even this success proved ephemeral and British forces were ordered to withdraw a few days later. The evacuation (Operation Alphabet) began in the north on the night of 3/4 June and Glorious arrived off the coast on 2 June to provide support, although she only carried nine Sea Gladiators of 802 and six Swordfish from 823 Squadrons for self-defence as it was hoped to evacuate the RAF fighters if at all possible. Ten Gladiators of 263 Squadron were flown aboard from their base at Bardufoss during the afternoon of 7 June and the Hurricanes of 46 Squadron were landed without significant problems in the early evening despite having a much higher landing speed than the biplanes. These had been flown off from land bases to keep them from being destroyed in the evacuation after the pilots discovered that a 7 kg (15 lb) sandbag carried in the rear of the Hurricane allowed full brakes to be applied immediately on landing. This was the first time that high-performance monoplanes without tailhooks had landed on an aircraft carrier.

The commanding officer of Glorious, Captain Guy D'Oyly-Hughes, was a former submariner who had been executive officer of Courageous for 10 months. He was granted permission to proceed independently to Scapa Flow in the early hours of 8 June. Howland maintains the reason was to hold a court-martial of his Commander (Air), J. B. Heath, who had refused an order to carry out an attack on shore targets on the grounds that the targets were at best ill-defined and his aircraft were unsuited to the task. Heath had been left behind in Scapa to await trial. Another rationale was that Glorious was running short of fuel. One possibility was that Glorious, with her Swordfish detachment equipped with long-range fuel tanks, had been selected for Operation Paul, the mining of Luleå harbor, which had to happen before Narvik was evacuated.

=== Sinking ===
Unknown to the British, the German Navy had launched Operation Juno: the German battleships Scharnhorst and Gneisenau, the heavy cruiser Admiral Hipper and four destroyers were ordered to attack the British base at Harstad and support the German advance towards Narvik. Whilst preparing to attack on 7 June, the German commander realized the British were evacuating Norway and instead of attacking Harstad, he chose to intercept the evacuation convoys on 8 June. During the morning of 8 June some ships were intercepted but no convoy was found. The German force then split up. Admiral Hipper and the four destroyers were sent to Trondheim to refuel and then provide artillery support for the German force (Gruppe Feuerstein) advancing to Narvik.

Scharnhorst and Gneisenau continued to search for convoys in the Norwegian Sea. At 15:45 a lookout at the highest platform on Scharnhorst sighted a dust cloud, and then the mast of Glorious at a distance of 46 km (29 mi). The German battleships gave chase immediately and at 16:10 the two escorting destroyers, Acasta and Ardent were detected as well. (Note: All times used in this section are Greenwich Mean Time.)

The British spotted the German ships shortly after 16:00 and Ardent was dispatched to investigate. Glorious did not alter course or increase speed. Five Swordfish were ordered to the flight deck and Action Stations were ordered 16:20. No combat air patrol was being flown, no aircraft were ready on the deck for quick take-off and there was no lookout in Glorious's crow's nest. Scharnhorst opened fire on Ardent at 16:27 at a range of 16,000 yards (15 km), causing the destroyer to withdraw, firing torpedoes and making a smoke screen. Ardent scored one hit with her 4.7-inch guns on Scharnhorst but was hit several times by the German ships' secondary armament and sank at 17:25.

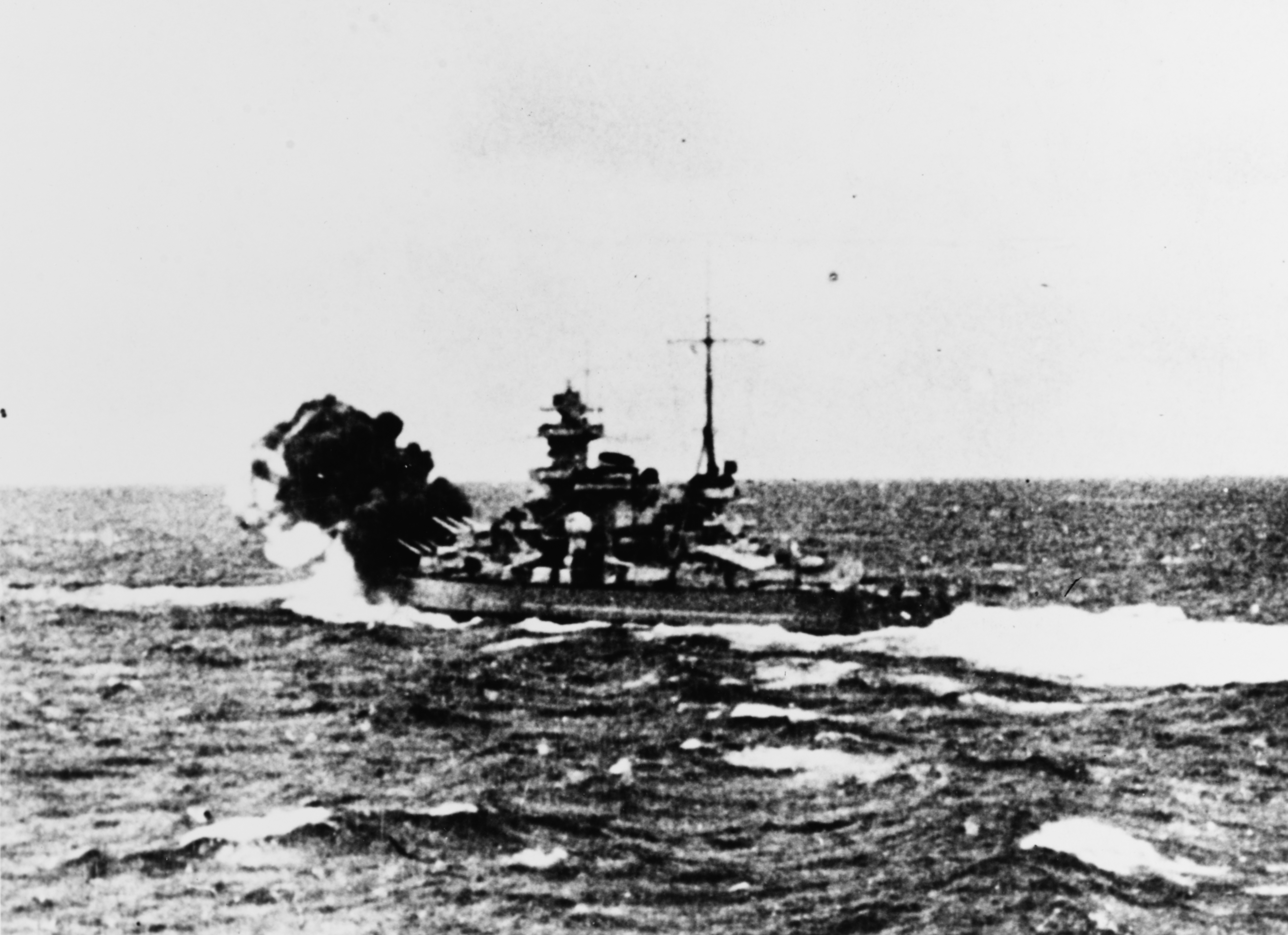
Scharnhorst firing on Glorious, 8 June 1940

Scharnhorst switched her fire to Glorious at 16:32 and scored her first hit six minutes later on her third salvo, at a range of 26,000 yards (24,000 m), (or 15 miles), when one 28.3-centimetre (11.1 in) shell hit the forward flight deck and burst in the upper hangar, starting a large fire. This hit destroyed two Swordfish being prepared for flight and the hole in the flight deck prevented any other aircraft from taking off. Splinters penetrated a boiler casing and caused a temporary drop in steam pressure. At 16:58 a second shell hit the homing beacon above the bridge and killed or wounded the captain and most of the personnel stationed there. Ardent's smokescreen became effective enough to impair the visibility of the Germans from about 16:58 to 17:20 so they ceased fire on Glorious.

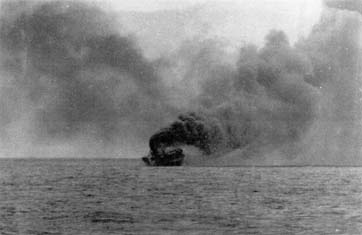
Glorious beginning to sink

Glorious was hit again in the centre engine room at 17:20 and this caused her to lose speed and commence a slow circle to port. She also developed a list to starboard. The German ships closed to within 16,000 yards and continued to fire at her until 17:40. Glorious sank at 18:10, approximately at 68°38′N 03°50′E, with 43 survivors.

As the German ships approached Glorious, Acasta, which had been trying to maintain the smokescreen, broke through her own smoke and fired two volleys of torpedoes at Scharnhorst. One of these hit the battleship at 17:34 abreast her rear turret and badly damaged her. Acasta also managed one hit from her 4.7-inch guns on Scharnhorst, but was riddled by German gunfire and sank at around 18:20.

Survivors estimated that about 900 men abandoned Glorious. With Scharnhorst damaged by the torpedo hit and unaware that Allied ships were not in contact with Glorious the German force withdrew and did not try to pick up survivors. The Royal Navy meanwhile, knew nothing of the sinking until it was announced on German radio. The Norwegian ship Borgund, on passage to the Faroe Islands, arrived late on 10 June and picked up survivors, eventually delivering 37 alive to Tórshavn of whom two later died. Another Norwegian ship, Svalbard II, also making for the Faeroes, picked up five survivors but was sighted by a German aircraft and forced to return to Norway, where the four still alive became prisoners of war for the next five years. Another survivor from Glorious was rescued by a German seaplane. Therefore, the total of survivors was 40, including one each from Acasta and Ardent. The total killed or missing was 1,207 from Glorious, 160 from Acasta and 152 from Ardent, a total of 1,519.

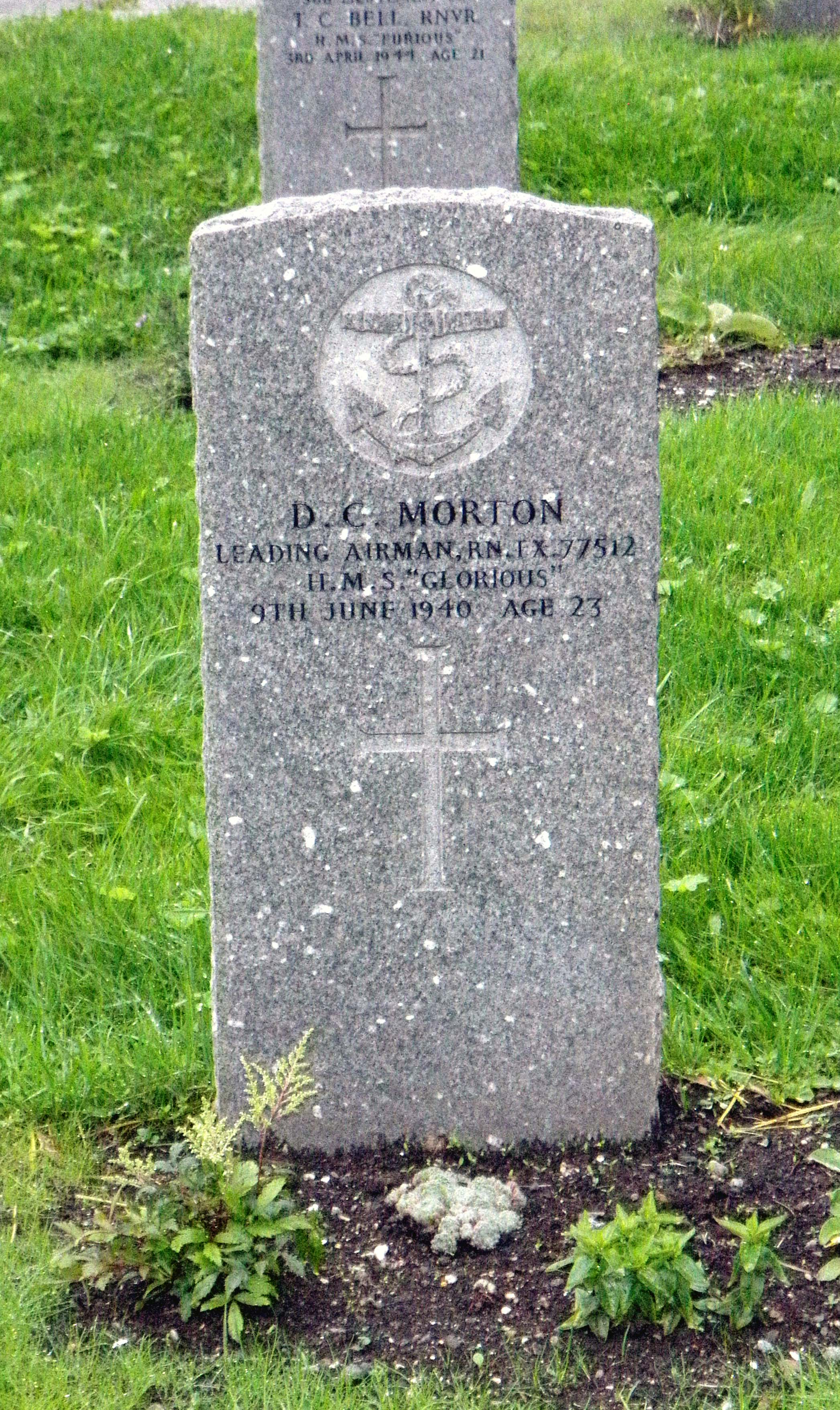
The gravestone in Tromsø of Leading Airman Donald Conrad Morton, who died in the sinking of Glorious

The sinkings and the failure to mount a rescue were embarrassing for the Royal Navy. All ships encountering enemies had been ordered to broadcast a sighting report, and the lack of such a report from Glorious was questioned in the House of Commons. It emerged that the heavy cruiser Devonshire had passed within 30–50 miles (48–80 km) of the battle, flying the flag of Vice-Admiral John Cunningham, who was carrying out orders to evacuate the Norwegian royal family to the UK and maintain radio silence. Some survivors from Glorious and Devonshire testified that a sighting report had been correctly sent, and received by Devonshire, but that it had been suppressed by Cunningham, who departed at high speed in accordance with his orders. It was also alleged that there was confusion over the use of wireless telegraphy frequencies on board Glorious which could have contributed to the failure of any other ship or shore-station to receive a sighting report. The absence of normal airborne patrols over Glorious and its destroyers, in conditions of maximum visibility, was named as a contributor to the sinkings.

The circumstances of the sinking were the subject of a debate in the House of Commons on 28 January 1999. After the existence of the Bletchley Park intelligence activities was made public in the 1970s, it was revealed that Naval Section personnel at Bletchley Park predicted a breakout into the Baltic by German warships based on traffic analysis but the RN Operational Intelligence Centre did not agree on the interpretation, and did not inform the Home Fleet.

=== Memorials ===
The most prominent memorial for the lost crew of HMS Glorious, HMS Ardent and HMS Acasta is situated in Southsea Common, Portsmouth, overlooking the promenade and is accessible to the public at all times. There are 176 memorials from the 1,531 servicemen lost with HMS Glorious, HMS Ardent and HMS Acasta at the Portsmouth Naval Memorial.

For many years the only memorial to the seamen lost in the three ships was a stained-glass window in the church of St Peter Martindale in Cumbria, on the east side of Ullswater. A new memorial plaque dedicated to HMS Glorious, and her escort destroyers Ardent and Acasta, was unveiled in St. Nicholas's Church, in HMS Drake, Devonport in 2002. On 8 June 2010, 70 years after the loss of Glorious, Acasta and Ardent, a memorial plaque inscribed in English and Norwegian was unveiled near the Trondenes Historical Centre in Harstad, Norway, the two destroyers' last port of call. A memorial plaque is mounted on a stone plinth next to a memorial tree, in the National Memorial Arboretum in Alrewas, Staffordshire. It can be found in the gardens in location 19-81. On 8 June 2019, a memorial plaque was unveiled in the Belvedere Gardens, Plymouth Hoe, dedicated to all crew members who lost their lives onboard HM Ships Glorious, Ardent and Acasta.

A model of HMS Glorious by model maker Norman A. Ough built for the Royal United Services Museum is now on display in the Fleet Air Arm Museum at RNAS Yeovilton.
