= 15th Carrier Air Group =

Royal Navy Fleet Air Arm Carrier Air Group

- White Ensign
- Active: 30 June 1945 to 30 March 1947; 16 May 1947 - 15 January 1952
- Country: United Kingdom
- Branch: Royal Navy
- Type: Carrier Air Group
- Size: One Colossus-class aircraft carrier plus support ships
- Part of: Fleet Air Arm

The 15th Carrier Air Group (15th CAG) was a carrier air group of the Royal Navy's Fleet Air Arm. It was initially formed in June 1945, for service in the British Pacific Fleet, until disbanding in March 1947. The group was embarked on the Colossus-class aircraft carrier, HMS Venerable.

The 15th CAG reformed in May 1947, at RNAS Eglinton (HMS Gannet), in County Londonderry, Northern Ireland, for embarkation on a sister ship, HMS Vengeance. In late 1951 the group was deployed on another sister ship HMS Theseus. The 15th Carrier Air Group disbanded in January 1952, at RNAS Culdrose (HMS Seahawk), in Cornwall, England.

== Naval Air Squadrons ==
15th Carrier Air Group consisted of a number of squadrons of the Fleet Air Arm.

Squadron	Aircraft	From	To	Notes
814 Naval Air Squadron	Fairey Barracuda to Dec 1945, then Fairey Firefly	June 1945	March 1947	
1851 Naval Air Squadron	Vought Corsair	June 1945	June 1946	Transferred to HMS Vengeance
802 Naval Air Squadron	Supermarine Seafire	June 1946	March 1947	
802 Naval Air Squadron	Hawker Sea Fury	May 1947	April 1950	15th CAG reformed at RNAS Eglinton
814 Naval Air Squadron	Fairey Firefly	May 1947	November 1950	15th CAG reformed at RNAS Eglinton
809 Naval Air Squadron	de Havilland Sea Hornet	April 1950	September 1950	replaced 802 Squadron
802 Naval Air Squadron	Hawker Sea Fury	September 1950	January 1952	returned and replaced 809 Squadron
825 Naval Air Squadron	Fairey Firefly	June 1951	September 1951	
814 Naval Air Squadron	Fairey Firefly	September 1951	January 1952	rejoined

== History ==
The squadrons of the Fleet Air Arm, stationed aboard the Royal Navy's Fleet and Light Fleet aircraft carriers for the British Pacific Fleet, were restructured into Air Groups in accordance with the policies of the United States Navy after the end of World War II in Europe. This reorganisation was intended to enhance operational effectiveness in the Pacific Theater against Japanese forces in 1945. The first four Colossus-class aircraft carriers were intended to accommodate Carrier Air Groups numbered from thirteen to eighteen. Each group was to consist of a squadron of twenty-one Vought Corsair aircraft and a squadron of twelve Fairey Barracuda planes.

=== 1945 - 1947 ===
The 15th Carrier Air Group was formed on 30 June 1945 and was based on the light aircraft carrier, HMS Venerable, a Colossus-class aircraft carrier. The group initially consisted 814 Naval Air Squadron, flying Fairey Barracuda, a carrier-borne torpedo and dive bomber aircraft, and 1851 Naval Air Squadron, flying Vought Corsair, an American carrier-borne fighter aircraft. 814 Squadron replaced its Fairey Barracuda with Fairey Firefly, a carrier-borne fighter and reconnaissance aircraft, in December 1945. Then, in June 1946 1851 NAS transferred to sister ship, HMS Vengeance and 802 Naval Air Squadron replaced it in the Air Group, bringing its Supermarine Seafire aircraft, a navalised version of the Supermarine Spitfire fighter. The 15th CAG was disbanded in 1947.

=== 1947 - 1952 ===
The 15th Carrier Air Group was reestablished on 16 May 1947 at RNAS Eglinton (HMS Gannet), County Londonderry, Northern Ireland. This reformation was intended for the Colossus-class aircraft carrier, HMS Vengeance, and included 802 and 814 Naval Air Squadrons. At this location, 802 Squadron transitioned from its Supermarine Seafire aircraft to Hawker Sea Fury, a British fighter aircraft. In April 1950, 802 Squadron departed from the group and was succeeded by 809 Naval Air Squadron, which introduced the de Havilland Sea Hornet, a twin-engined fighter aircraft. However, in the subsequent September, 802 Squadron rejoined the group while 809 Squadron exited.

In November 1950, the group was reduced to only 802 Squadron following the departure of 814 Squadron. It was not until June 1951 that the group regained its original strength with the arrival of 825 Naval Air Squadron, which operated Fairey Firefly aircraft. Nevertheless, 825 Squadron remained for approximately three months before departing in September 1951. Subsequently, 814 Squadron returned to the Air Group and the group embarked on another Colossus-class aircraft carrier, HMS Theseus. The 15th Carrier Air Group was disbanded on 15 January 1952 at RNAS Culdrose (HMS Seahawk) in Cornwall, England.

== Air Group Commanders ==
List of the commanding officers of the 15th Carrier Air Group, with date of appointment:

1945 - 1947

- Lieutenant Commander P.D. Gick, DSC, RN, from 30 June 1945
- Lieutenant Commander T.G.V. Percy, DSC, RN, from 14 January 1946
- disbanded - 30 March 1947

1947 - 1952

- Lieutenant Commander W.R.J. MacWhirter, DSC, RN, from 16 May 1947
- Lieutenant Commander J.G. Baldwin, DSC, RN, from 15 March 1948
- Lieutenant Commander J.N. Ball, DSC, RN, from 16 May 1949
- Lieutenant Commander J.O. Armour, RN, from 19 April 1950
- none, from 22 November 1950
- disbanded - 15 January 1952

== See also ==
- List of Fleet Air Arm groups
- List of aircraft carriers of the Royal Navy
- List of aircraft of the Fleet Air Arm
- List of Fleet Air Arm aircraft in World War II
