= 814 Naval Air Squadron =

Flying squadron of the Royal Navy's Fleet Air Arm

- Squadron badge
- Active: Royal Air Force; 1938–1939; Royal Navy: 1939–1942; 1944–1950; 1950–1955; 1957–1959; 1960–1961; 1961–1970; 1973–2000; 2001–present
- Country: United Kingdom
- Branch: Royal Navy
- Type: Torpedo Bomber Reconnaissance squadron
- Role: Carrier-based anti-submarine warfare (ASW)
- Part of: Fleet Air Arm
- Home station: RNAS Culdrose
- Nickname: 'The Flying Tigers'
- Motto: In hoc signo vinces (Latin for 'In this sign you will conquer')
- Aircraft: AgustaWestland Merlin HM2
- Battle honours: Atlantic 1940
- Website: Official website

Commanders
- Current commander: Commander Ben Kerley

Insignia
- Squadron Badge Description: Blue, base a bar wavy white a tiger's mask affronty proper winged white (1946)
- Identification Markings: 701-710 (Swordfish); A3A+ (Swordfish May 1939); H3A+ (Swordfish September 1939); single letters (Barracuda); B1A+ (Barracuda February 1945); R1A+ (Barracuda June 1945); 370-381 (Barracuda July 1945); 270-281 (Firefly); 285-296 (Firefly November 1946); 200-211 (Firefly September 1947); 213-224 (Firefly 1952); 255-263 (Firefly July 1952); 381-388 (Avenger); 280-287 (Gannet); 281-288 (Whirlwind); 340-347 (Wessex); 270-277 (Wessex June 1964); 264-275 (Sea King); 265-270 (Merlin)
- Fin Carrier/Shore Codes: B (Barracuda July 1945); T N (Firefly); V (Firefly November 1946); Q (Firefly September 1947); Q:T (Firefly 1952); J:GN (Firefly July 1952); GN:C (Avenger); H (Whirlwind); H:V (Wessex); H:B:L:N (Sea King); R (Merlin)

814 Naval Air Squadron (814 NAS), also referred to as 814 Squadron, nicknamed the Flying Tigers, is a Fleet Air Arm (FAA) naval air squadron of the United Kingdom's Royal Navy (RN). It currently operates the AgustaWestland Merlin HM2 anti-submarine warfare helicopter and is based at RNAS Culdrose (HMS Seahawk) in Cornwall.

The squadron was established in December 1938 and has undergone multiple disbandments and reformations throughout its history. It participated in the Second World War, initially operating Fairey Swordfish and later transitioning to Fairey Barracuda. In the late 1940s and early 1950s, the squadron adopted the Fairey Firefly, utilising four different variants before replacing them with Grumman Avenger, which was subsequently succeeded by Fairey Gannet. Beginning in 1960, the squadron shifted to helicopter operations, starting with the Westland Whirlwind, which was soon replaced by Westland Wessex. From 1983 to 2000, it operated four variants of the Westland Sea King, specifically designed for anti-submarine warfare.

== History ==
814 Naval Air Squadron was formed on 1 December 1938 as a torpedo reconnaissance squadron at RAF Southampton, Hampshire, equipped with six Fairey Swordfish I torpedo bomber aircraft.

=== Second World War ===
Originally embarked on aircraft carrier HMS Ark Royal in January 1939, the squadron was amongst those transferred to the Admiralty, when it took control of the FAA on 24 May 1939. and it transferred to HMS Hermes at the outbreak of the Second World War.

==== West Africa ====
HMS Hermes set sail for West Africa where the squadron helped search for the German cruiser Admiral Graf Spee. It also took part in the Battle of Dakar, damaging the Vichy French battleship Richelieu on 8 July 1940. Heavy anti-aircraft fire meant the squadron only achieved a single hit, however the battleship was out-of-action for over a year as a result. For its participation in the Battle of the Atlantic during 1940, the squadron received its only battle honour.

==== Indian Ocean ====
HMS Hermes and the squadron travelled to the Indian Ocean in December 1940. The squadron went on to provide support for land forces in British Somaliland in East Africa, during which five enemy merchant ships were captured. In May 1941, the squadron provided support to the Royal Air Force (RAF) in Iraq and later provided convoy protection in the Indian Ocean. In April 1942, while the squadron was ashore, HMS Hermes was sunk by Japanese aircraft off Ceylon (now Sri Lanka) whilst transiting between Trincomalee and the Maldives. 814 NAS subsequently disbanded during December 1942 at Katukurunda in Ceylon.

==== Far East ====
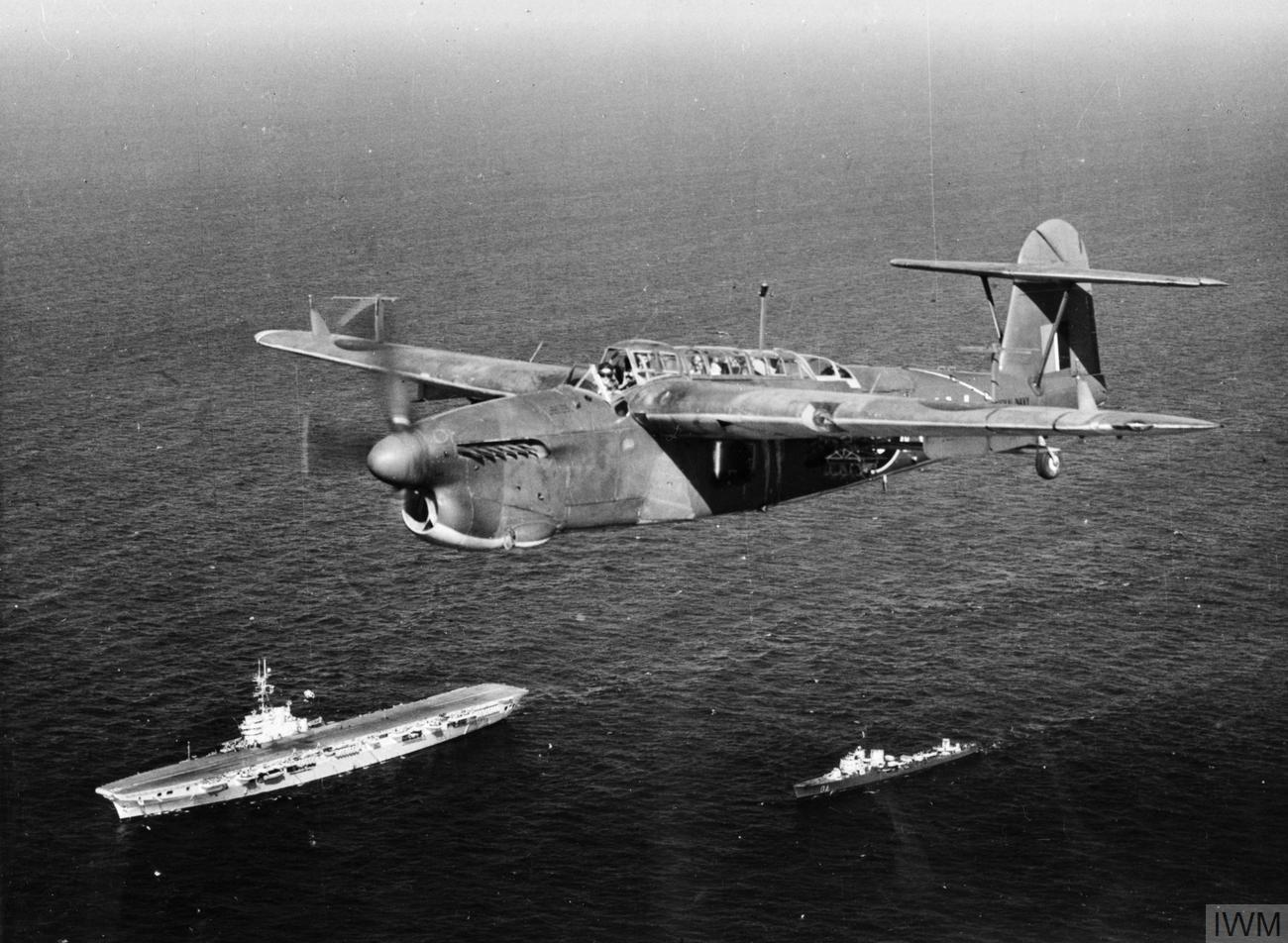
A Fairey Barracuda Mk II of 814 Squadron flying over HMS Venerable

The squadron reformed at RNAS Stretton (HMS Blackcap) in Cheshire during July 1944, now equipped with the Fairey Barracuda Mk II, a torpedo and dive bomber. It embarked on HMS Venerable in March 1945 and headed to the Far East for patrols.

In June, the squadron was reduced from eighteen to twelve aircraft and subsequently integrated into the 15th Carrier Air Group. It did not engage in any combat operations in the Pacific prior to the Japanese surrender.

=== Firefly (1945-1955) ===
In December 1945, the squadron began re-equipping with twelve Fairey Firefly FR.I aircraft at RNAS Nowra (HMS Nabbington) in New South Wales. The Fairey Firefly was developed in accordance with the Naval Specification N.5/40, continuing the Fleet Air Arm's tradition of creating fast two-seater aircraft that effectively combined fighter and reconnaissance capabilities. Production commenced, with the first Mk I delivered on 4 March 1943. The FR Mk I variant was specifically designed for fighter and reconnaissance missions, equipped with ASH detection radar to enhance its operational effectiveness.

By March 1946, these aircraft were re-embarked on HMS Venerable. Following additional operations in the Far East, most of the aircraft were subsequently transferred to sister ship HMS Glory, while the remaining units were decommissioned. The squadron returned to the UK and disembarked at RNAS Eglinton (HMS Gannet), County Londonderry, in March 1947. In May, the squadron underwent reform with new aircraft and re-embarked for the Mediterranean in September, remaining stationed at RNAS Ta Kali (HMS Goldfinch), Malta, from November until March 1948, when it returned home, leaving its aircraft behind.

In April, eight Firefly FR. 4s were received at RNAS Eglinton, which were then embarked on another sister ship HMS Vengeancein August. The Fairey Firefly FR.4 had its first flight on 25 May 1945. Its high-altitude performance improved significantly due to the two-speed, two-stage supercharged Rolls-Royce Griffon 74 engine, which boosted maximum speed by 50 miles per hour (80 km/h). Modifications included a four-bladed Rotol airscrew and an extended fin leading edge for enhanced stability. Additionally, two fairings were added beneath the wings: the port fairing for auxiliary fuel and the starboard fairing for the radar scanner.

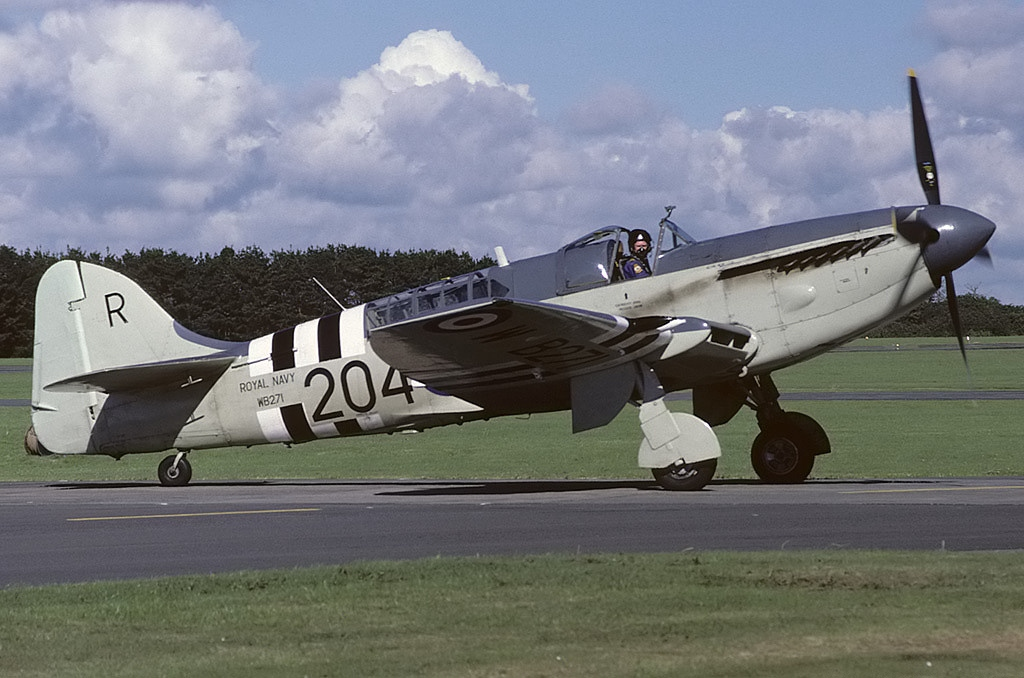
Fairey Firefly AS.5; an example of the type used by 814 Squadron

The squadron visited South Africa in October, engaging in an eight-day goodwill tour before returning home for Christmas. The following year, the carrier sailed to the Arctic Circle for cold weather trials, during which the first AS.5s were received, leading to the squadron being fully re-equipped by September. The Mk.5 emerged as the most extensively manufactured variant of the later Fireflies. This model marked a shift towards equipping the Firefly with various tools tailored for specialised functions, resulting in the development of subvariants such as the FR.5 for fighter reconnaissance, the NF.5 for night-fighting, and the AS.5 for anti-submarine patrol. The differences among these Fireflies were mainly internal. Early 1950 saw the squadron spend two months in the Mediterranean, followed by a visit to Norway in July. However, it disbanded on 19 November 1950.

The squadron reformed on 22 November 1950 at RNAS Culdrose (HMS Seahawk), Cornwall, initially using Firefly FR. 1s until the arrival of eight Firefly AS. 6s at the end of January 1951. The Mk.6, designated AS.6, was specifically designed for anti-submarine warfare and served as the primary anti-submarine aircraft for the Fleet Air Arm until the mid-1950s. Alongside 809 Squadron, it formed the 7th Night Air Group, the first all-weather group, and embarked on HMS Vengeance for work-up in May 1951, completing 927 hours of night training and earning the Boyd Trophy. In September, it transferred to the 15th Carrier Air Group aboard another sister ship HMS Theseus, but after the Air Group disbanded in January 1952, the squadron remained shore-based until embarking in the Audacious-class aircraft carrier HMS Eagle in June, making two Arctic trips before the year's end. The year 1953 was primarily spent on exercises, first in the Mediterranean and then in Home waters.

=== Avenger (1954-1955) ===
In March 1954, the squadron was re-equipped with eight Avenger AS.5 aircraft, 814 became the first Fleet Air Arm unit to operate this variant of Grumman Avenger. In 1953, during the presentation of the Navy Estimates in the House of Commons, it was declared that the Grumman Avenger would re-enter service with the Royal Navy. The purpose of the Avengers was to enhance the anti-submarine capabilities. A total of 100 post-war Avengers were provided under the Mutual Defence Assistance Programme, specifically of the TBM-3E variant utilised by the US Navy. The AS.5 aircraft underwent complete modifications to meet British specifications. The squadron later deployed to Malta in February 1955 aboard the name ship of her class HMS Centaur. After returning to home waters, the squadron disbanded in November, with the aircraft subsequently stored at RNAS Abbotsinch (HMS Sanderling), Renfrewshire.

=== Gannet (1957-1959) ===
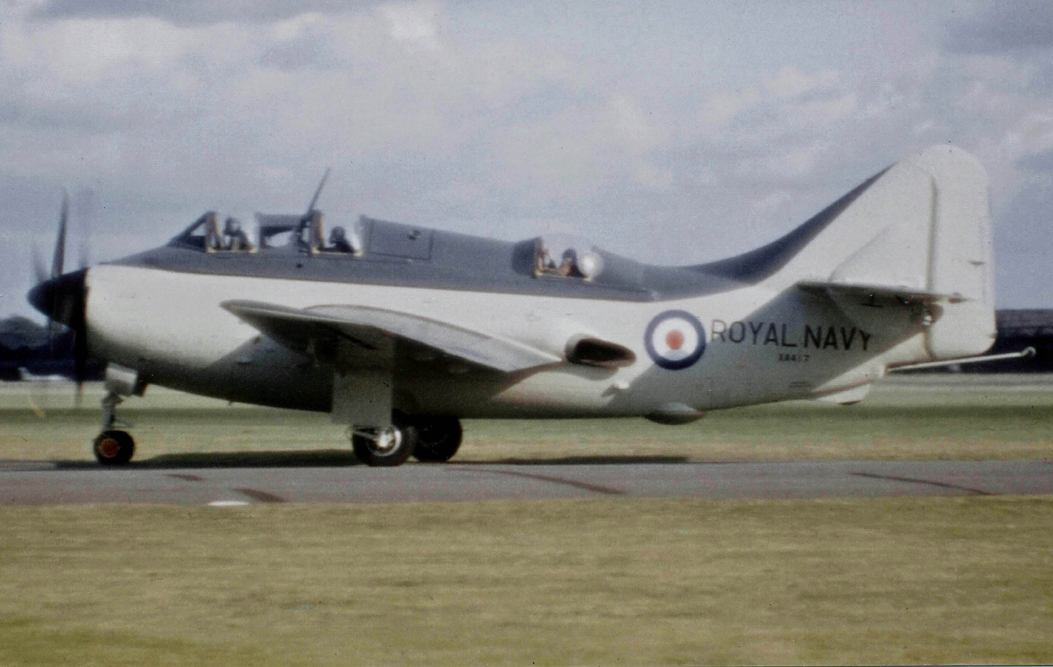
Fairey Gannet AS.4; an example of the type used by 814 Squadron

In January 1957, 814 Squadron was re-established at RNAS Culdrose as an anti-submarine unit, equipped with eight Gannet AS.4 anti-submarine warfare aircraft. In August, the squadron embarked in HMS Eagle to participate in an exercise in Norwegian waters the subsequent month.

The Fairey Gannet, introduced in 1955, became a pivotal element of the Fleet Air Arm's carrier-based anti-submarine capabilities. It was the first aircraft worldwide to feature a dual airscrew-turbine system, combining the benefits of a twin-engine design with the simplicity of a single-engine configuration. Notably, the Gannet was the first in the FAA to integrate both search and strike functions, equipped with a spacious weapons bay and a large retractable radar scanner. The Gannet AS.4, which made its maiden flight on 13 April 1956, succeeded the AS.1 and was enhanced by the addition of the Armstrong Siddeley Double Mamba (101) ASM.D.3 engine. This advancement marked the successful completion of the FAA's initiative to modernise its anti-submarine fleet.

A journey to the Mediterranean occurred in January 1958, followed by another in July. After these deployments, the squadron returned to its home base at the end of the year. Following an additional Mediterranean exercise in early 1959 and a visit to Brest, the squadron disembarked at RNAS Culdrose, where it ultimately disbanded in December.

=== Whirwind (1960-1961) ===
In 1960, the squadron continued in the ASW role and was equipped with its first helicopter, the Westland Whirlwind, when 814 Squadron was re-established as a helicopter unit at RNAS Culdrose in April 1960, equipped with eight Whirlwind HAS.7 helicopters. The Westland Whirlwind was the British adaptation of the American Sikorsky S-55 helicopter. The final iteration of this aircraft in Fleet Air Arm service was the HAS.7, powered with a British Alvis Leonides Mk.5 engine. This variant was engineered for primary operations in anti-submarine warfare, marking it as the first British helicopter dedicated to such tasks. It featured advanced equipment, including radar and dipping Asdic, to enhance submarine detection capabilities. In July, the squadron embarked in the Centaur-class light fleet carrier HMS Hermes for a joint exercise with the United States Sixth Fleet, followed by participation in a NATO exercise in home waters in September. The squadron's next deployment took it to the Far East in December 1960, and it returned to the UK in April 1961, ultimately disbanding at Culdrose on 14 September.

=== Wessex (1961-1970) ===
The Whirlwind was later replaced with the Westland Wessex HAS.1. The Wessex HAS.3 was introduced in 1967, providing the squadron with its first radar-equipped helicopter. During this time, the squadron was embarked on HMS Victorious and HMS Hermes to patrol east of the Suez. In 1968, 814 NAS was again awarded the Boyd Trophy, on this occasion for achieving a high state of operational effectiveness at sea with the Wessex HAS.3. The squadron decommissioned for a second time in July 1970.

=== Sea King (1973-2000) ===
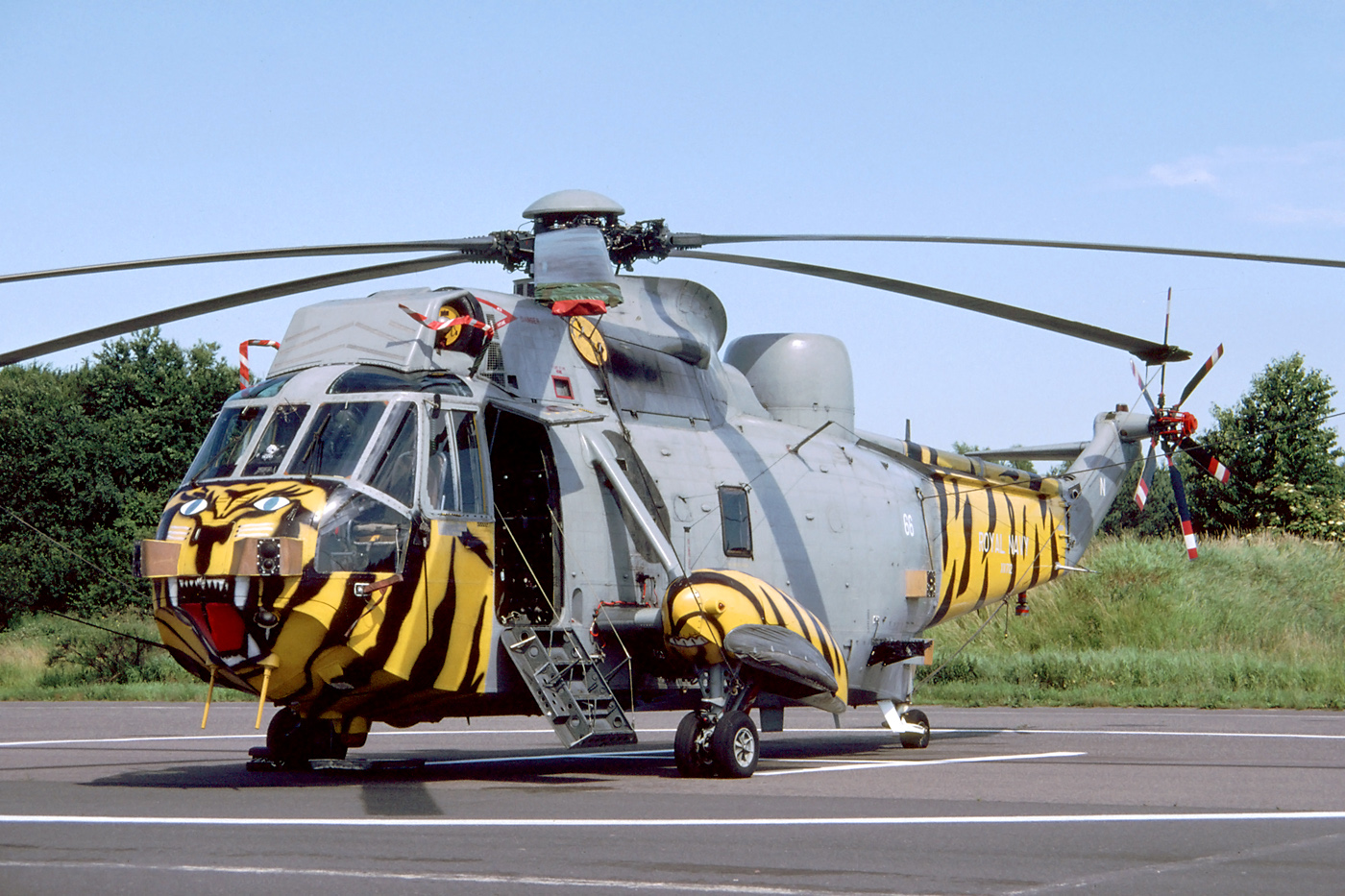
Westland Sea King HAS.6 of 814 Squadron

The squadron reformed at RNAS Prestwick (HMS Gannet) in Ayrshire during March 1973, equipped with four Westland Sea King HAS.1 helicopters, a variant specialising in anti-submarine warfare (ASW). It embarked on tours of duty with the Centaur-class light fleet aircraft carrier HMS Bulwark and her sister ship HMS Hermes, assisting with the evacuation of British citizens during the 1974 Turkish invasion of Cyprus.

That same year the squadron received the Australia Shield for its high standard of operational readiness. The Sea King HAS.2 was introduced in 1977, making the squadron the first in the Royal Navy to operate a helicopter with passive sonar equipment. 814 Squadron relocated from Prestwick to RNAS Culdrose (HMS Seahawk) in Cornwall on 9 April 1976 and has since remained there. By the end of 1976 the unit strength had increased to nine helicopters.

The squadron became a full member of the NATO Tiger Association in 1979, an organisation with the aim of promoting solidarity between air-forces of NATO.

By the time of the Falklands War in April 1982, the upgraded Sea King HAS.5 had entered service with the squadron and in August 1982 it embarked on the Invincible-class aircraft carrier HMS Illustrious for South Atlantic patrols. Capability was further enhanced in October 1990 when 814 Squadron re-equipped with Sea King HAS.6. This variant of the Sea King saw action with the squadron whilst operating from the lead ship of her class HMS Invincible during the Gulf War in 1991 and later in the Bosnian War and Kosovo Wars. In December 2000, the unit was decommissioned for the third time.

=== Merlin (2001-present) ===
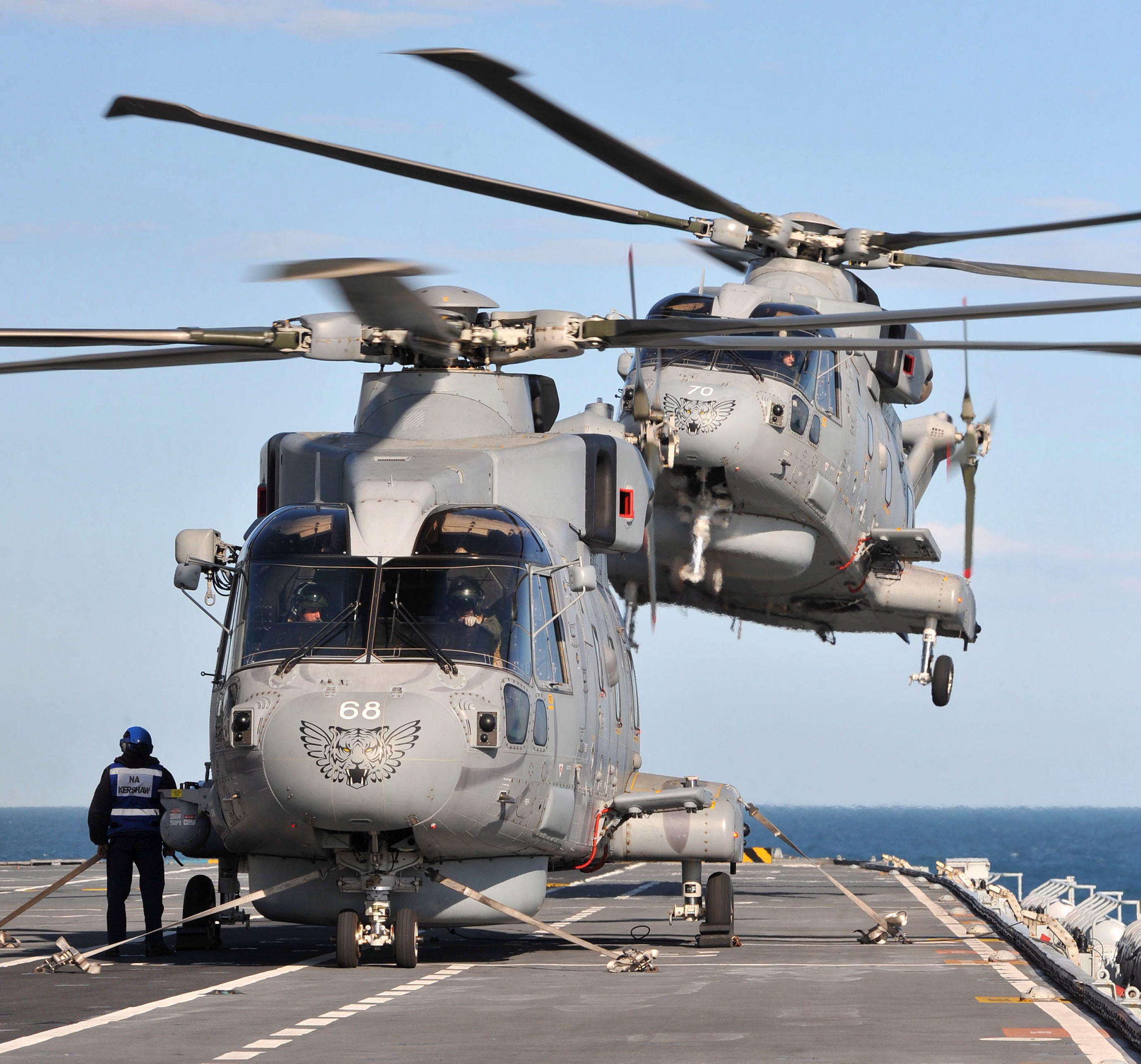
Two AgustaWestland Merlin HM2 of 814 NAS landing on HMS Illustrious during Exercise Joint Warrior in 2012. Note the tiger markings on the aircraft noses.

The squadron was re-established in October 2001 at RNAS Culdrose, equipped with the AgustaWestland Merlin HM1. The Merlin has taken the place of the Fleet Air Arm's anti-submarine warfare Sea King helicopter and is engineered for deployment on ships or operation from land in various maritime functions. In addition to its ASW role, it has capabilities in anti-piracy operations, delivery of humanitarian aid, casualty evacuation, medium lift under-slung loads (up to 3.8 tonnes), search and rescue, counter drugs and maritime patrol and security operations. The Merlin can be armed with BAE Systems Sting Ray torpedoes, Mark 11 depth charges and the Browning M3m .50 calibre machine gun. The squadron has over 200 personnel assigned to it and is the largest ever Merlin Fleet Air Arm squadron.

The squadron's Merlin's have seen operational service aboard HMS Illustrious, during the Iraq War (Operation Telic) and in the wider Persian Gulf area. In May 2012 it was involved in Exercise Joint Warrior off the coast of Scotland again with HMS Illustrious. The London 2012 Olympics saw the squadron deploy to RNAS Yeovilton in Somerset to perform maritime security operations. Yeovilton's location allowed the squadron's Merlins to quickly access amphibious transport dock HMS Bulwark, which was acting as the police command unit for the Olympic Sailing Regatta taking place in Weymouth Bay.

During December 2014, the Merlin HM1 was replaced with the Merlin HM2. The upgraded aircraft features a new mission system, digital cockpit, electro-optical camera and multi-static sonar system. For a two-week period in early 2016, two aircraft and over sixty personnel from 814 NAS took part if Exercise Dynamic Manta 16 in the Mediterranean. Based at Naval Air Station Sigonella in Sicilly, the unit worked alongside eight other NATO nations during the major anti-submarine warfare exercise. The squadron returned for the 2017 exercise, when they were again based at Sigonella and the 2018 exercise, when they were based at Catania - Fontanarossa Naval Air Station, also in Sicily. The aircraft and personnel of 829 Naval Air Squadron, also based at RNAS Culdrose, merged with 814 NAS in March 2018, creating the largest ever Merlin Fleet Air Arm squadron.

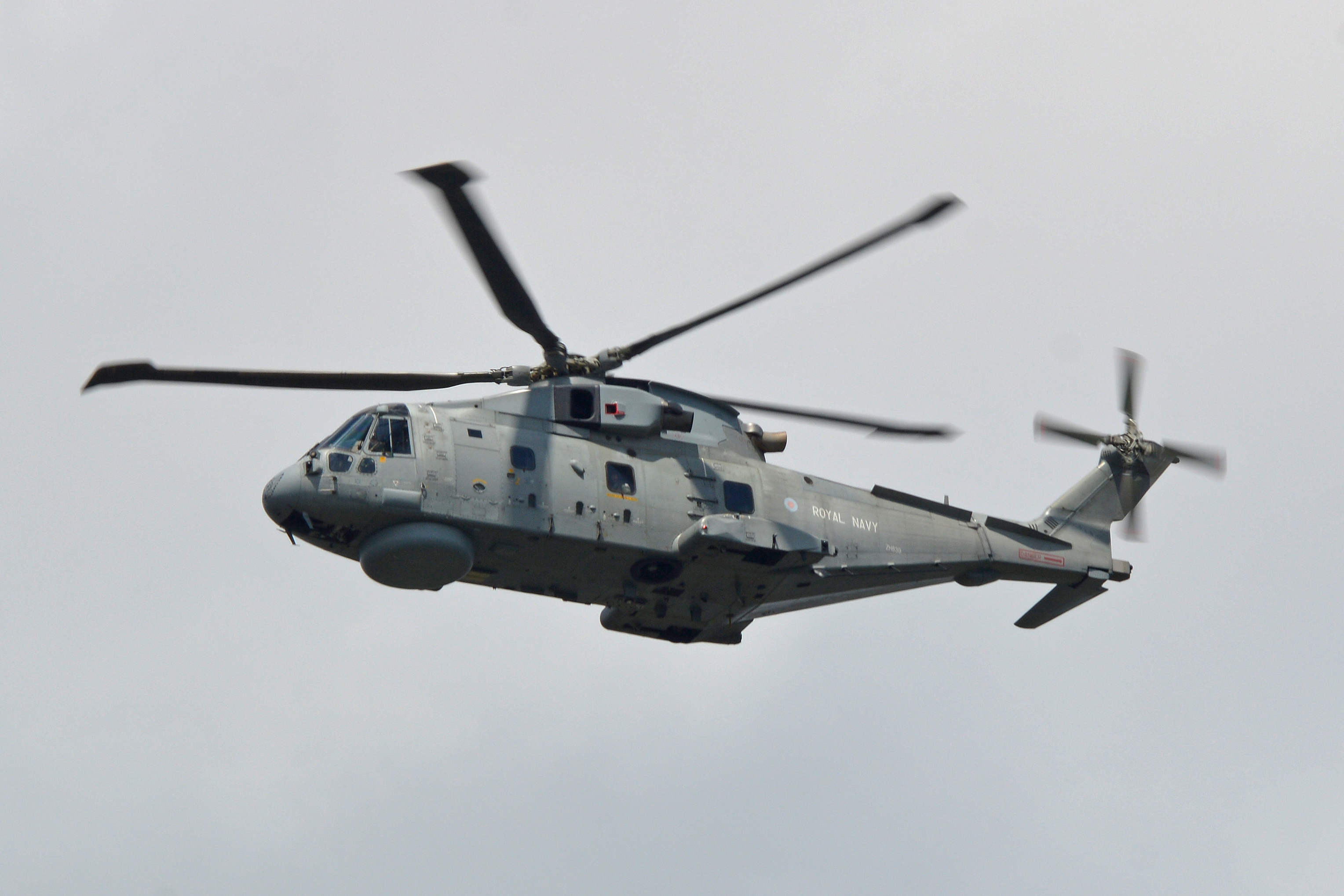
814 Squadron Merlin HM2 as part of ‘SEACAT’ formation in the Queens Platinum Jubilee Flypast

In January 2023, 814 Squadron reflected on its activities during the Chinese Year of the Tiger, which included anti-submarine warfare operations across the Mediterranean, North Atlantic and Barents Sea, participation in NATO Exercise Dynamic Manta 22, deployments aboard the Type 23 frigates HMS Northumberland and HMS Portland and support for freedom of navigation operations in the High North. During the period, the squadron flew more than 1,800 hours, contributed to the Queen’s Platinum Jubilee flypast, assisted in a Channel rescue, supported the NHS, and received the Breitling Trophy and Rolls-Royce Engineering Efficiency Trophy.

In 2025, 814 Naval Air Squadron contributed two maritime task-group flights to Operation Highmast, the Royal Navy’s Carrier Strike Group deployment. One flight was embarked in the Type 23 frigate HMS Richmond, which departed HMNB Devonport, Plymouth, in April with a Merlin HM2 from 814 Squadron embarked to provide anti-submarine warfare protection for the carrier strike group. The squadron subsequently described its 2025 deployment as comprising two maritime task-group flights, one embarked with HMS Richmond and the other aboard the Royal Fleet Auxiliary replinishemt tanker RFA Tidespring, with the flights operating as composite units that trained and deployed with a specific aircraft.

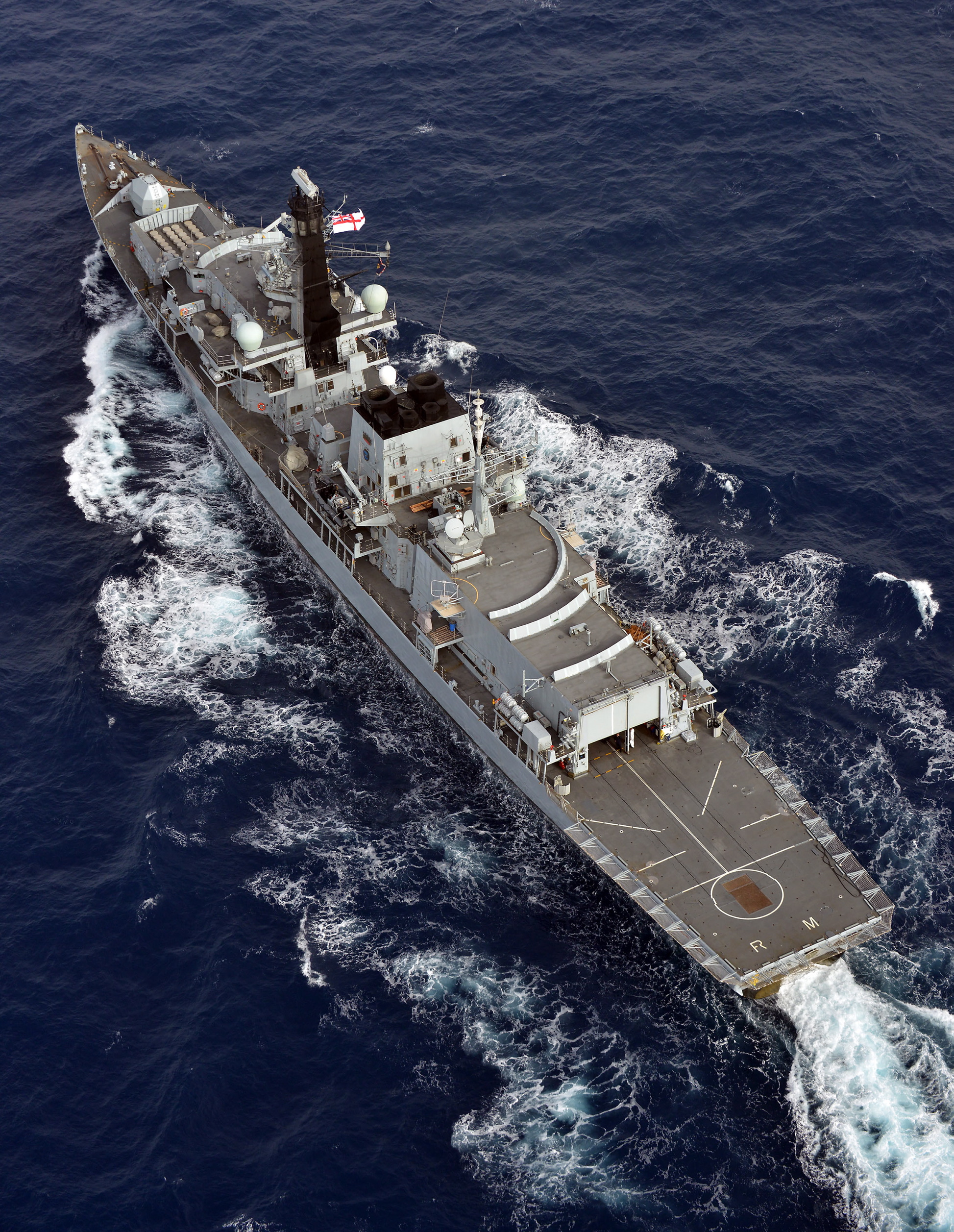
HMS Richmond

The Richmond flight operated Merlin HM2 ZH837 during the deployment; contemporary reporting identified the aircraft operating from HMS Richmond as part of Carrier Strike Group 25. The second detachment, designated Swordfish Flight, operated from RFA Tidespring under Lieutenant Commander Mike Curd, 814 NAS’s Swordfish Flight Commander. Its Merlin HM2 conducted anti-submarine warfare, surface searches, casualty evacuation and the transfer of personnel and stores around the task group. Contemporary photographic evidence identifies the aircraft embarked on RFA Tidespring as Merlin HM2 ZH845.

In May, the RFA Tidespring-based Merlin HM2 participated in an operational trial with a Puma AE unmanned aircraft operated by 700X Naval Air Squadron. The Merlin HM2 switched off its radar and instead used information from the Puma and its controllers to locate and approach simulated suspect vessels. The Royal Navy described the trial as the first operational use of a drone to help direct the actions of a crewed Royal Navy aircraft, demonstrating the potential for future manned–unmanned teaming.

The HMS Richmond flight returned to RNAS Culdrose at the end of the Carrier Strike Group deployment, while RFA Tidespring remained deployed separately after leaving the main group. The RFA Tidespring detachment subsequently returned to RNAS Culdrose after several months embarked with the replenishment tanker.

== Aircraft operated ==
The squadron has operated a variety of different aircraft and variants.

- Fairey Swordfish I (December 1938 - December 1942)
- Fairey Barracuda Mk II (July 1944 - January 1946)
- Fairey Firefly FR.I (December 1945 - March 1948, November 1950 - July 1951)
- Fairey Firefly FR.Mk 4 (April 1948 - August 1949)
- Fairey Firefly FR.Mk 5 (February 1949 - November 1950)
- Fairey Firefly AS.Mk 6 (January 1951 - March 1954)
- Grumman Avenger AS4 (March - May 1954)
- Grumman Avenger AS5 (March 1954 - November 1955)
- Fairey Gannet AS.4 (January 1957 - September 1959)
- Fairey Gannet T.2 (January - February 1957)
- Westland Whirlwind HAS.7 (April 1960 - September 1961)
- Westland Wessex HAS.1 (November 1961 - September 1967)
- Westland Wessex HAS.3 (August 1967 - July 1970)
- Westland Sea King HAS.1 (March 1973 - December 1977)
- Westland Sea King HAS.2 (November 1977 - June 1982)
- Westland Sea King HAS.5 (June 1982 - October 1992)
- Westland Sea King HAS.6 (October 1992 - November 2000)
- AgustaWestland Merlin HM1 (June 2001 - November 2014)
- AgustaWestland Merlin HM2 (December 2014 - date)
A selection of aircraft operated by 814 Naval Air Squadron

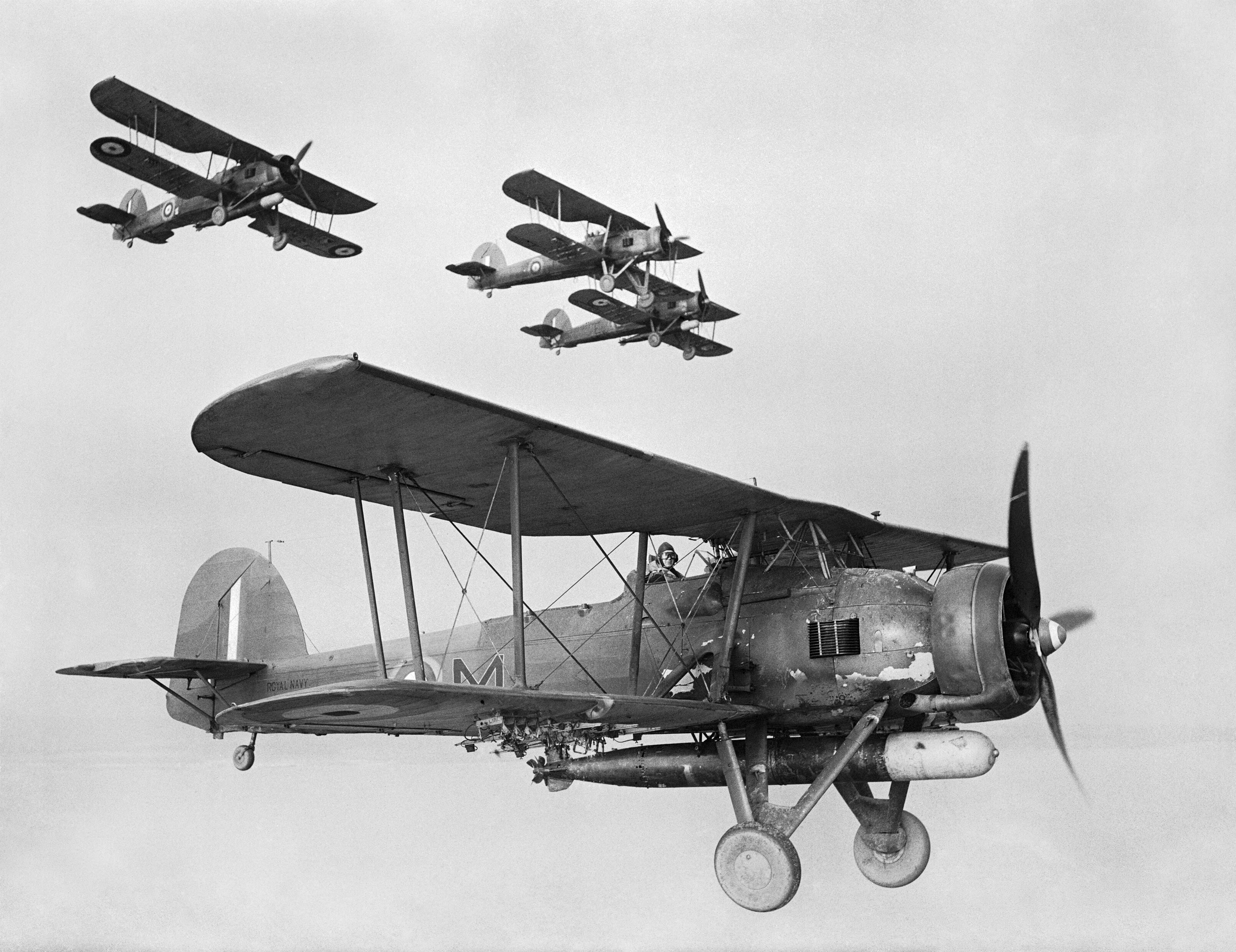
Fairey Swordfish Mk I torpedo bombers of the type operated by the squadron.

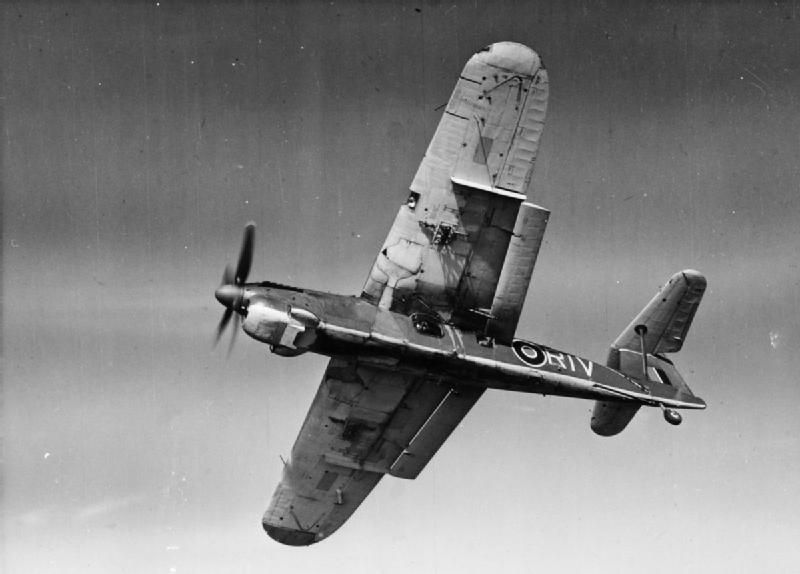
A Fairey Barracuda Mk II of 814 NAS, showing the observer's window, the distinctive dive brakes, the high tail plane, and one of the lugs in which the accelerator / catapult engages.

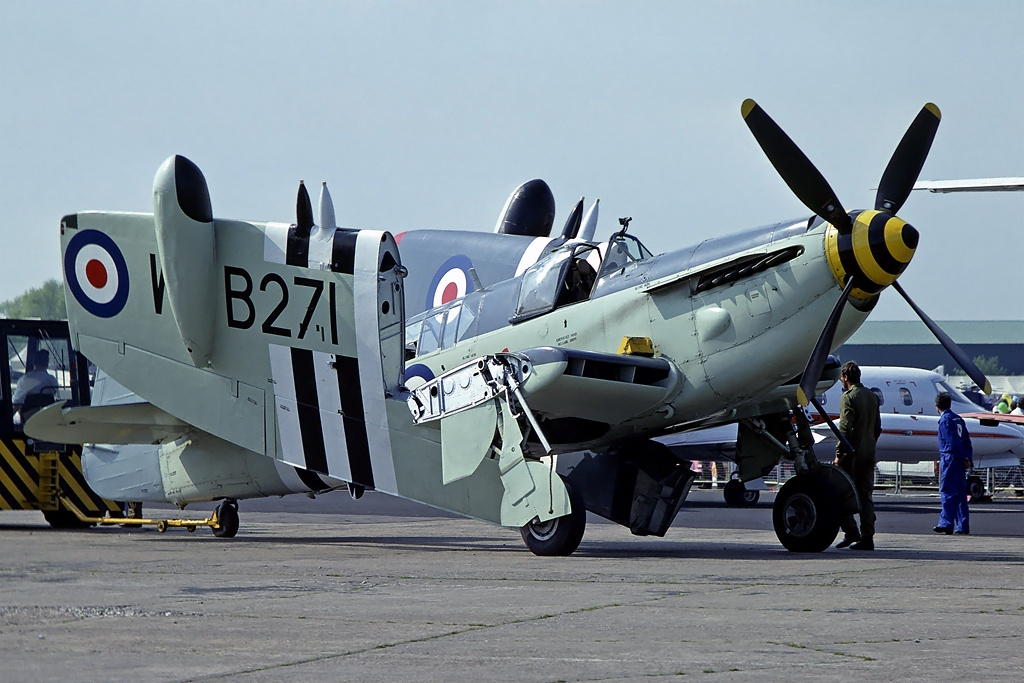
A Fairey Firefly AS.5 which served with 814 NAS, seen in 1980 during its time with the Royal Navy Historic Flight.

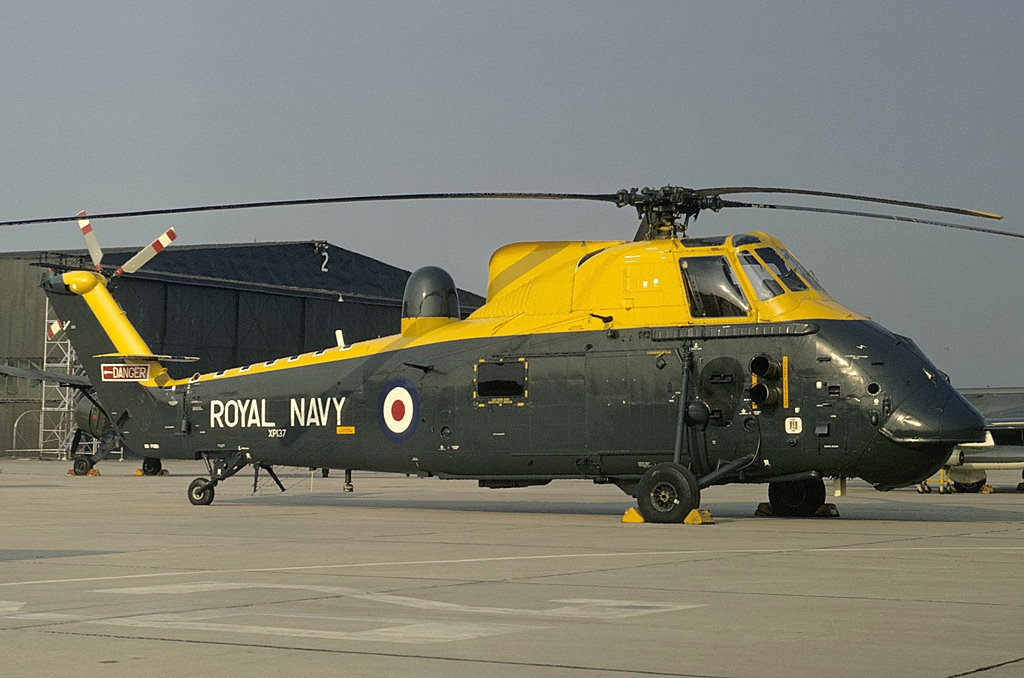
A Westland Wessex HAS.3

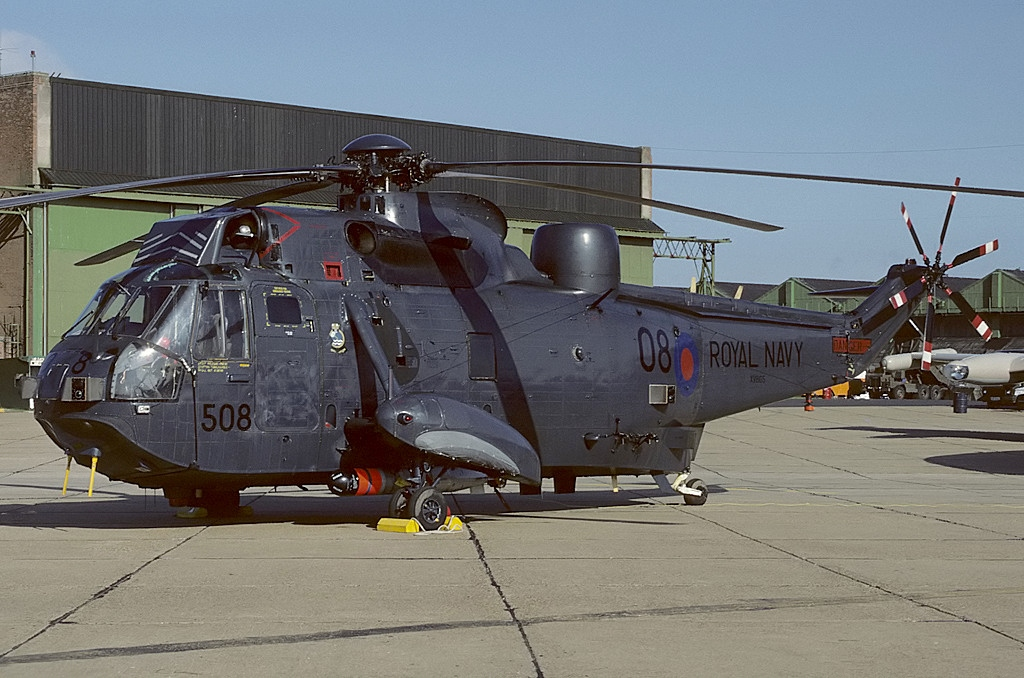
An 814 NAS Westland Sea King HAS.6 seen at RAF Mildenhall in 1986.

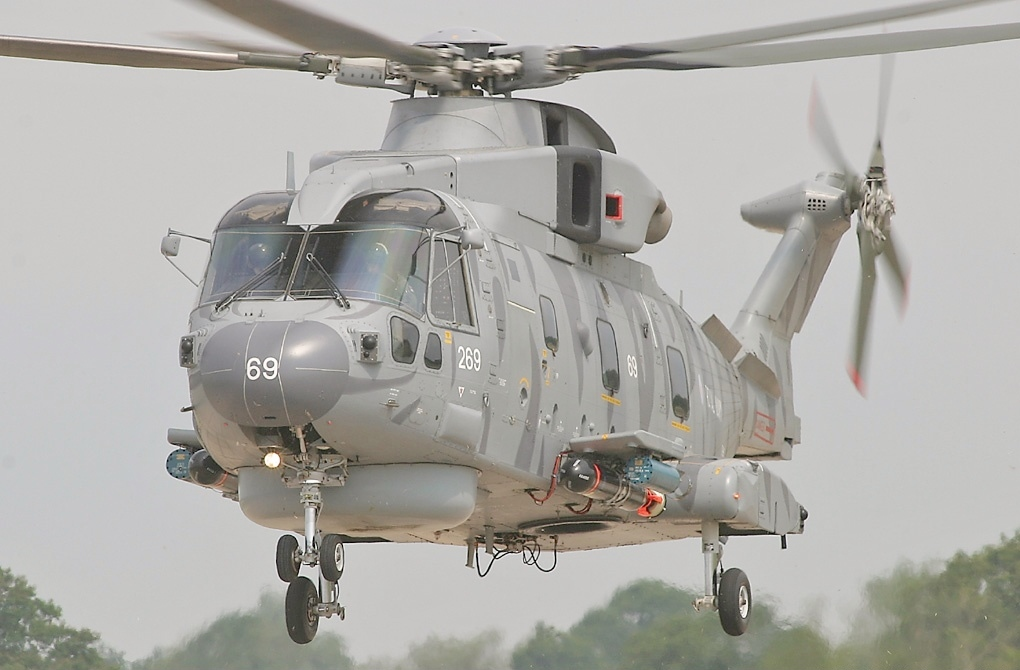
An AgustaWestland Merlin HM1 of 814 NAS seen arriving in 'tiger' stripes at the 2005 Royal International Air Tattoo.

== Battle honours ==
The battle honours awarded to 814 Naval Air Squadron are:

- Atlantic 1940

== Assignments ==
814 Naval Air Squadron was assigned as needed to form part of a number of larger units:

- 15th Carrier Air Group (30 June 1945 - 30 March 1947, 16 May 1947 - November 1950, September 1951 - January 1952)
- 7th Night Air Group (7 December 1950 - 1 June 1951)

== Commanding officers ==
List of commanding officers of 814 Naval Air Squadron:

1938 - 1942

- Lieutenant Commander N.S. Luard, DSC, RN, (Squadron Leader, RAF), from 1 December 1938
- Major W.H.N. Martin, RM, from 27 February 1941
- Lieutenant A.F. Paterson, RN, from 25 September 1942
- disbanded - 31 December 1942

1944 - 1950

- Lieutenant Commander J.S.L. Crabbe, RN, from 1 July 1944
- Lieutenant Commander(A) G.R. Coy, DSC, RN, from 28 November 1944
- Lieutenant Commander(A) A.D. Corkhill, DSC, RN, from 30 January 1946
- Lieutenant Commander(A) G.R. Humphries, RN, from 12 November 1946
- Lieutenant Commander F.A. Swanton, DSC & Bar, RN, from 17 April 1947
- Lieutenant J.S. Barnes, RN, from 18 December 1948
- Lieutenant Commander L.D. Empson, RN, from 24 March 1949
- Lieutenant Commander A.C. Lindsay, DSC, RN, from 27 April 1950
- disbanded - 19 November 1950

1950 - 1955

- Lieutenant Commander A.C. Lindsay, DSC, RN, from 22 November 1950
- Lieutenant Commander J.A. McColgan, RN, from 6 February 1952
- Lieutenant Commander W.V.E. Andon, RN, from 12 September 1952
- Lieutenant Commander S.W. Birse, OBE, DSC, RN, from 5 October 1952
- Lieutenant Commander P.R. Elias, DSC, RN, from 12 March 1954
- disbanded - 4 November 1955

1957 - 1959

- Lieutenant Commander R. Fulton, RN, from 14 January 1957
- Lieutenant Commander J.J. Philips, RN, from 4 January 1958
- Lieutenant Commander G.D.H. Sample, DSC, RN, from 12 September 1958
- Lieutenant Commander D.C. Eve, RN, from 1 May 1959
- disbanded - 30 September 1959

1960 - 1961

- Lieutenant Commander P.E. Bailey, RN, from 1 April 1960
- Lieutenant Commander J.G. Brigham, RN, from 8 August 1961
- disbanded - 14 September 1961

1961 - 1970

- Lieutenant Commander L.J.B. Reynolds, RN, from 28 November 1961
- Lieutenant Commander J.G. Brigham, RN, from 17 December 1962
- Lieutenant Commander J.G. Beyfus, RN, from 3 October 1963
- Lieutenant Commander P.J. Lynn, RN, from 22 September 1964
- Lieutenant Commander N.K.L. Whitwam, RN, from 26 November 1965
- Lieutenant Commander M.C.S. Apps, RN, from 17 January 1966
- Lieutenant Commander D.J.A. Bridger, RN, from 17 July 1967
- Lieutenant Commander J.P. Gunning, RN, from 2 October 1967
- Lieutenant Commander M.J. Harvey, RN, from 14 October 1968
- disbanded - 14 July 1970

1973 - 2000

- Lieutenant Commander C.J. Horscroft, RN, from 30 March 1973
- Lieutenant Commander E.C. Ashton-Johnston, RN, from 29 July 1974
- Lieutenant Commander C.L.L. Quarrie, RN, from 15 April 1976
- Lieutenant Commander R.E. Ward, RN, from 17 December 1976
- Lieutenant Commander K. Hindle, RN, from 10 August 1978
- Lieutenant Commander A.R. Welton, RN, from 21 July 1980
- Lieutenant Commander R.StJ. Bishop, RN, from 5 January 1982
- Lieutenant Commander R.M. Turner, RN, from 17 May 1982
- Lieutenant Commander A.G. Rogers, RN, from 25 May 1983
- Lieutenant Commander J.R.B. Bullock, RN, from 18 November 1984
- Lieutenant Commander N.J. Cowley, RN, from 14 December 1986
- Lieutenant Commander D.C. Goodall, RN, from 20 October 1988
- Lieutenant Commander M.R. Pepper, RN, from 14 January 1990
- Lieutenant Commander M.M.D. Mason, RN, from 8 May 1992
- Lieutenant Commander A.C.V. Prince, RN, from 1 April 1993
- Lieutenant Commander I.H. Beaumont, RN, from 2 October 1994
- Lieutenant Commander R.E. Drewett, MBE, RN, from 1 February 1996
- Lieutenant Commander M.R. Skeer, MBE, RN, from 1 September 1998
- disbanded - 21 December 2000

2001–present

- Lieutenant Commander S.J. Murray, RN, from 1 March 2001
- Lieutenant Commander N.G. Dunn, RN, from 14 April 2003 (Commander 1 February 2006)
- Commander P.R.J. Munro-Lott, RN, from 13 April 2006
- (A/Commander J.P. Phillips, RN, temp 7 May - 21 June 2006)
- Commander S. Deacon, RN, from 17 December 2007
- Commander D. Goldsmith, RN, from 21 January 2010
- Commander C.M. Stock, RN, from 16 March 2012
- Commander S.A. Finn, RN, from 7 January 2014
- Commander B.M. Spoors, RN, from 28 July 2015
- Commander S. Birchett, RN, from January 2018
- Commander C. Wood, RN, from 2020
- Commander A. Gaunt, RN, from 17 May 2022
- Commander E. Holland, RN, from March 2024
- Commander B. Kerley, RN, from 4 August 2026

Note: Abbreviation (A) signifies Air Branch of the RN or RNVR.

== Squadron traditions and affiliations ==
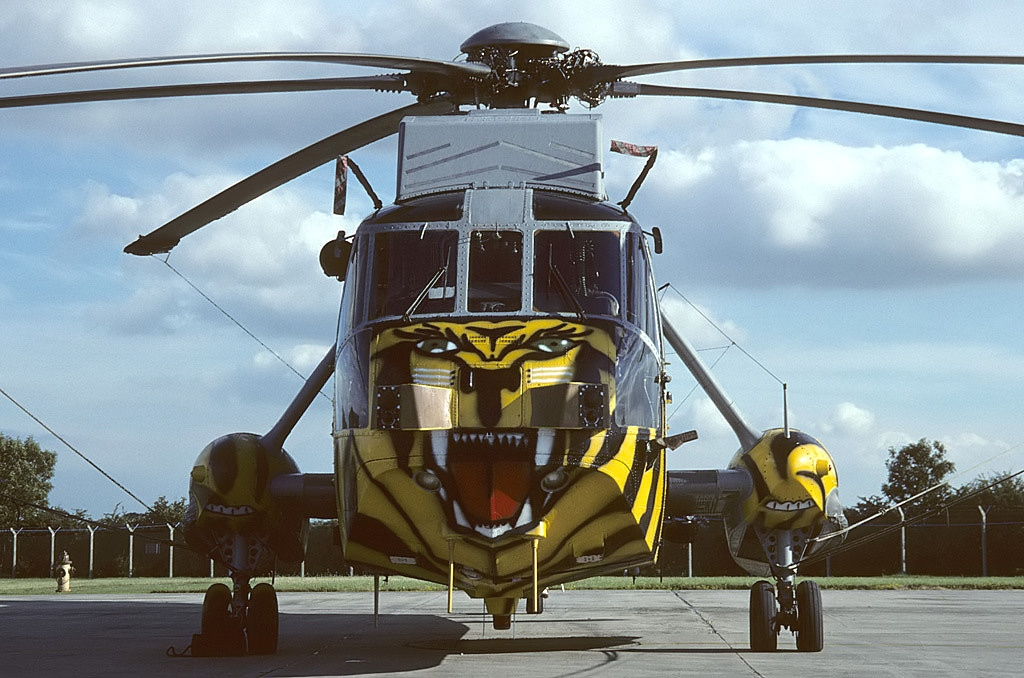
A Westland Sea King HAS6 of 814 NAS in a tiger colour-scheme, representing the unit's status as a member of the NATO Tiger Association.

=== Traditions ===
The squadron nickname is 'the Flying Tigers' and its badge features a tiger's head, representing its membership of the NATO Tiger Association.

=== Affiliations ===
The following organisations are affiliated with the squadron.

- Devon and Cornwall Constabulary
- The Gold and Silver Wyre Drawers
- Leicester Tigers (Rugby team)
- NATO Tiger Association
- Solent University Royal Naval Unit
- Treliske Hospital (Royal Cornwall Hospital)
- Erewash Borough Council (Derbyshire)

== See also ==
- Exercise Strikeback
