= 1851 Naval Air Squadron =

Inactive flying squadron of the Royal Navy's Fleet Air Arm

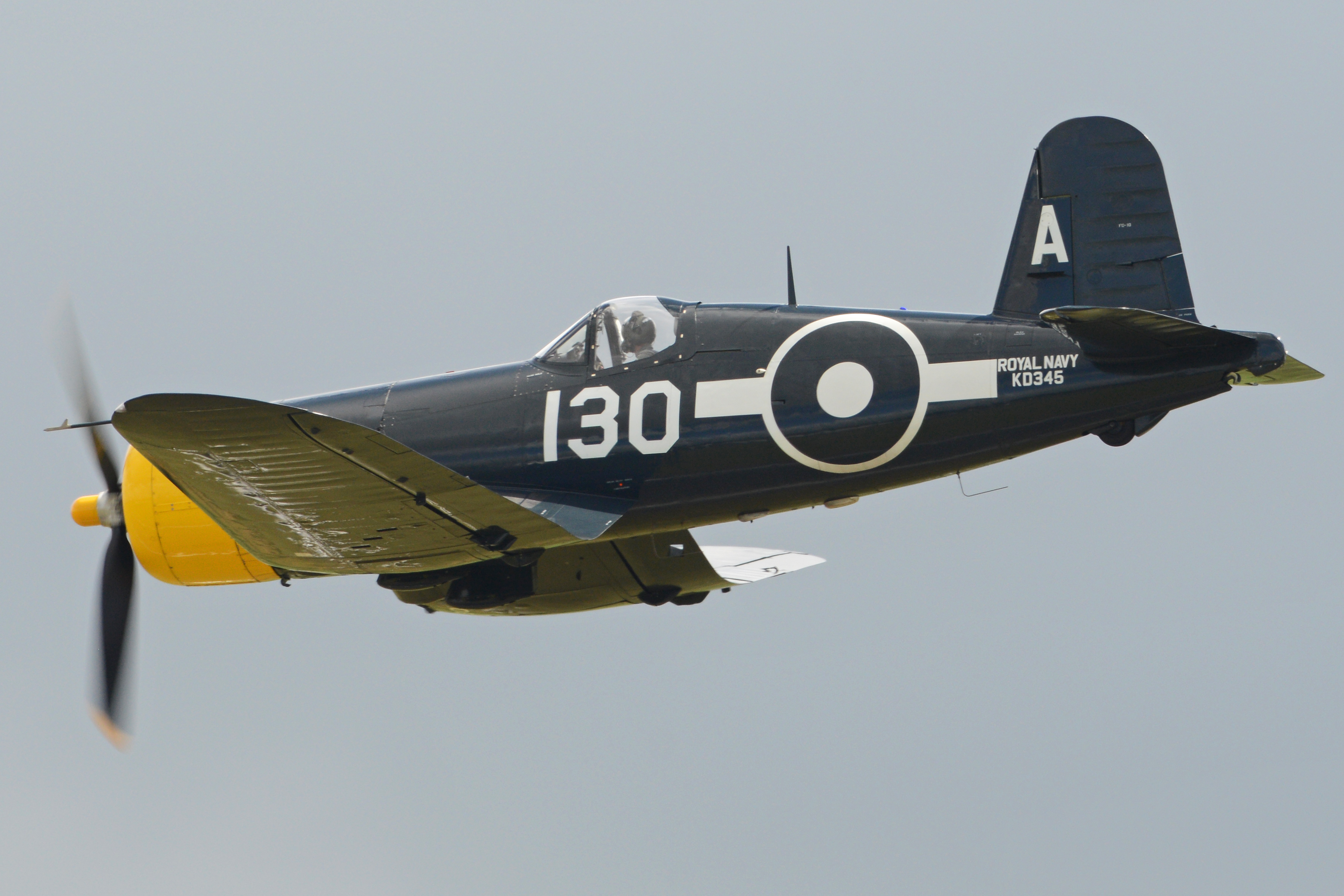
- A Fleet Air Arm Goodyear FG-1D Corsair; an example of the type used by 1851 NAS
- Active: 1944–1946
- Disbanded: 13 August 1946
- Country: United Kingdom
- Branch: Royal Navy
- Type: Single-seat fighter squadron
- Role: Fighter squadron
- Size: Eighteen aircraft
- Part of: Fleet Air Arm
- Home station: See Naval air stations section for full list.

Insignia
- Identification Markings: 1V7+ R6A+ (July 1945); 111-133 (February 1946)
- Tail Codes: B:T:Y (February 1946)

Aircraft flown
- Fighter: Vought Corsair

1851 Naval Air Squadron (1851 NAS) was a Fleet Air Arm (FAA) naval air squadron of the United Kingdom's Royal Navy (RN), which last disbanded in 1946. It formed in the United States at RN Air Section Brunswick as a fighter squadron, in September 1944 and embarked on HMS Thane at the end of the year for transportation to the UK, arriving at Belfast. The squadron embarked in HMS Venerable in March 1945, it spent some time in the Mediterranean using HMS Falcon, RNAS Hal Far, as a shore station. Eventually reaching HMS Valluru, RNAMY Tambaram, in southern India in July, the squadron became part of the 15th Carrier Air Group, but too late to see action during the Second World War.

== History ==
=== Single-seat fighter squadron (1944–1946) ===
1851 Naval Air Squadron formed on 1 September 1944 in the United States at RN Air Section Brunswick, which was located at United States Naval Air Station (USNAS) Brunswick, Maine, as a Single Seat Fighter Squadron, under the command of Lieutenant Commander(A) D.J. McDonald, RN.

It was equipped with eighteen Vought Corsair aircraft, an American carrier-borne fighter-bomber. These were the Goodyear built FG-1D variant, designated Corsair Mk IV by the Fleet Air Arm. Aerodrome Dummy Deck Landings (ADDLs) were undertaken at the nearby Bar Harbor Naval Auxiliary Air Facility (NAAF), Bar Harbor, Maine. The squadron flew to RN Air Section Norfolk situated at USNAS Norfolk, Virginia, to enable it to undertake Deck Landing Training (DLT) with the US Navy's escort carrier the USS Charger, before returning to RN Air Section Brunswick.

With working up completed the squadron left RN Air Section Brunswick and flew to RN Air Section Floyd Bennett Field, located at USNAS Floyd Bennett Field, Brooklyn, New York City, on 23 December and then onto RN Air Section Norfolk on 28 December, for embarkation in the Ruler-class escort carrier, HMS Thane, for transportation to the United Kingdom.

All aircrew, equipment and aircraft were embarked in HMS Thane at Naval Station Norfolk and she sailed for New York City, departing on New Years Eve 1944 and arriving in New York Harbor the following day. She departed on 3 January 1945 as part of convoy CU 53, bound for Liverpool, England, but broke off for Belfast, Northern Ireland, arriving on 14 January and the squadron disembarked to Royal Naval Air Maintenance Yard Belfast (HMS Gadwall).

1851 Naval Air Squadron embarked in the colossus-class aircraft carrier, HMS Venerable on 6 March. It used RN Air Section Hal Far, Malta, from 20 March as an its shore base while operating in the Mediterranean. It later continued on to southern India, reaching Royal Naval Air Maintenance Yard Tambaran (HMS Valluru), Madras, on 7 July where the squadron became part of the 15th Carrier Air Group.

With the surrender of Japan and the end of the Second World War the squadron saw no action. It did have an operational detachment at Royal Naval Air Station Kai Tak (HMS Nabcatcher), Hong Kong. Squadron strength reduced in December 1945 and the following year the squadron transferred to the colossus-class aircraft carrier, HMS Vengeance. She sailed for the UK in July 1946, the lend-lease Vought Corsair aircraft were pushed over the side and into the sea. 1851 Naval Air Squadron disbanded on arrival to HMNB Devonport on 13 August.

== Aircraft flown ==
1851 Naval Air Squadron flew only one aircraft type:

- Vought Corsair Mk IV fighter bomber (September 1944 - July 1946)

== Assignments ==
1851 Naval Air Squadron was assigned as needed to form part of a number of larger units:

- 15th Carrier Air Group (30 June 1945 - 11 June 1946)

== Naval air stations ==
1851 Naval Air Squadron operated from a few naval air stations of the Royal Navy, in the United Kingdom, a number overseas, a couple of Royal Navy fleet carriers and an escort carrier:

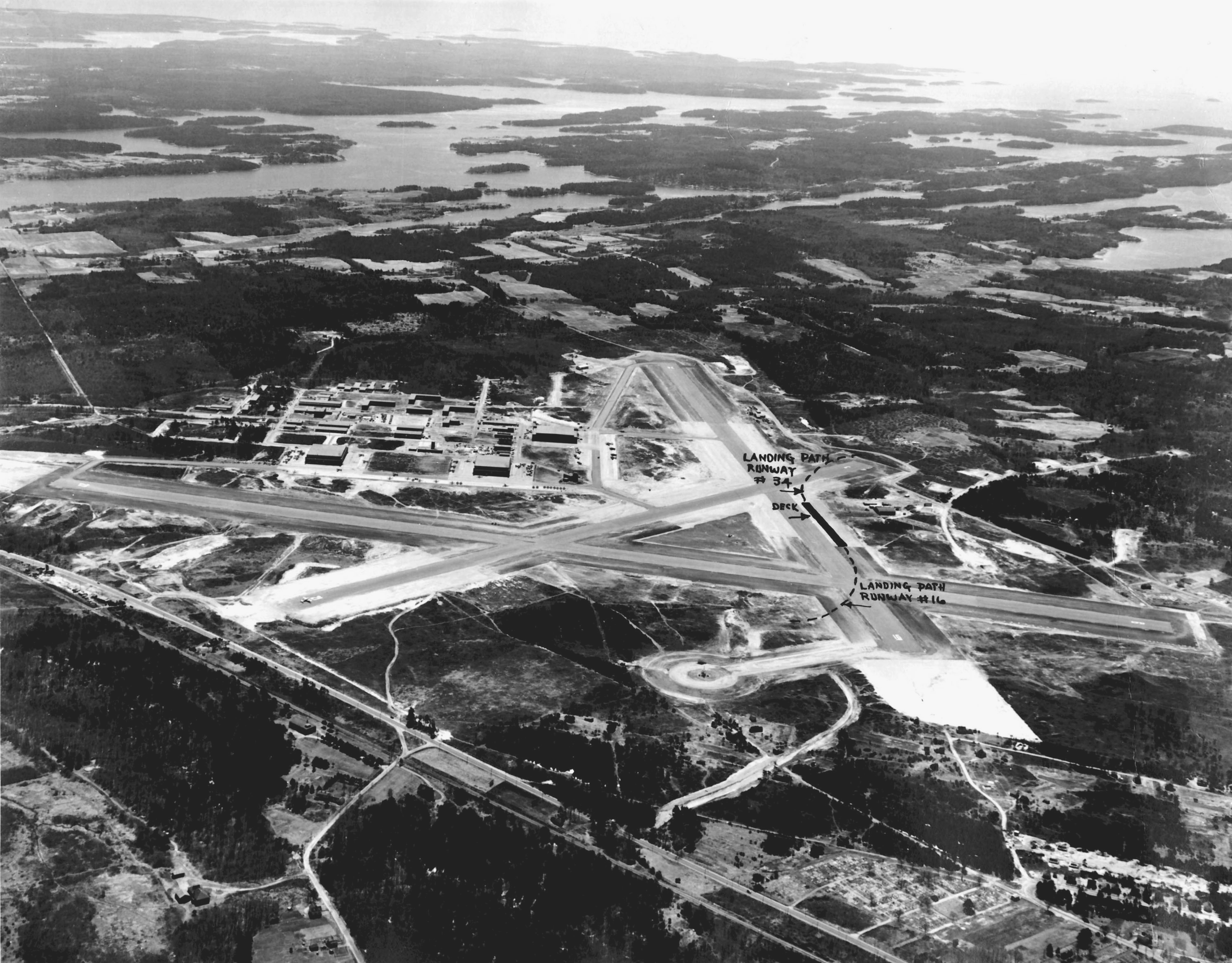
Naval Air Station Brunswick in 1944

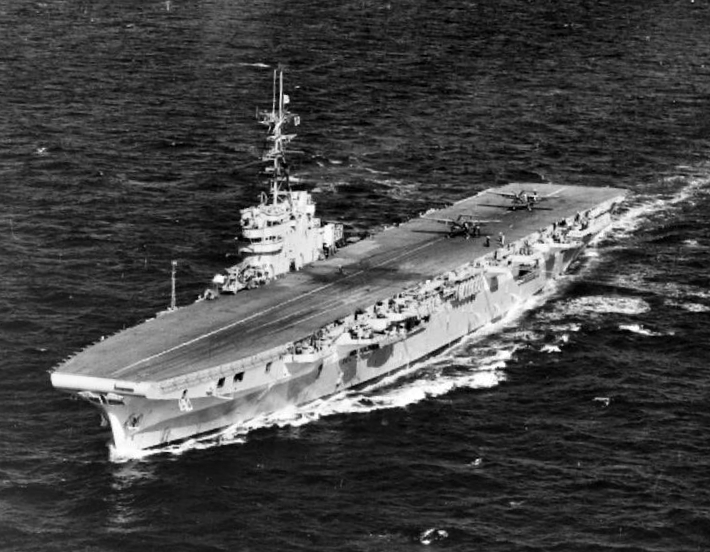
HMS Venerable (R63) underway in 1945

- RN Air Section Brunswick, Maine, (1 September - 23 December 1944)
  - RN Air Section Norfolk, Virginia, (Detachment Deck Landing Training (DLT) USS Charger 7 - 10 November 1944)
- RN Air Section Floyd Bennett Field, Brooklyn, (23 - 28 December 1944)
- HMS Thane (28 December 1944 - 14 January)
- Royal Naval Air Maintenance Yard Belfast (HMS Gadwall), County Antrim, (14 - 17 January 1945)
- Royal Naval Air Station Eglinton (HMS Gannet), County Londonderry, (17 January - 6 March- 1945)
- HMS Venerable (6 - 20 March 1945)
- RN Air Section Hal Far, Malta, (20 March - 16 April 1945)
- HMS Venerable (16 - 20 April 1945)
- RN Air Section Hal Far, Malta, (20 April - 21 May 1945)
- HMS Venerable (21 May - 7 June 1945)
- Royal Naval Air Maintenance Yard Tambaram (HMS Vallura), India, (7 June - 3 July 1945)
- HMS Venerable (3 - 21 July 1945)
- Royal Naval Air Station Schofields (HMS Nabthorpe), New South Wales, (21 July - 13 August 1945)
- HMS Venerable (13 - 28 August 1945)
  - Royal Naval Air Station Kai Tak (HMS Nabcatcher), Hong Kong, (Detachment eight aircraft 3 September - 18 October 1945)
- Royal Naval Air Station Trincomalee (HMS Bambara), Ceylon, (28 October - 13 December 1945)
- HMS Venerable (13 - 30 December 1945)
- Royal Naval Air Station Nowra (HMS Nabbington), New South Wales, (30 December 1945 - 24 January 1946)
- Royal Naval Air Station Schofields (HMS Nabthorpe), New south Wales, (24 January - 22 February 1946)
- HMS Venerable (22 February - 26 April 1946)
- Royal Naval Air Station Katukurunda (HMS Ukussa), Ceylon, (26 April - 28 May 1946)
- HMS Venerable (28 - 31 May 1946)
- Royal Naval Air Station Katukurunda (HMS Ukussa), Ceylon, (31 May - 11 June 1946)
- HMS Vengeance (11 - 15 June 1946)
- Royal Naval Air Station Katukurunda (HMS Ukussa), Ceylon, (15 June - 18 July 1946)
- HMS Vengeance (18 July - 13 August 1946)
- disbanded - United Kingdom (13 August 1946)

== Commanding officers ==
List of commanding officers of 1851 Naval Air Squadron with date of appointment:

- Lieutenant Commander(A) D.J. McDonald, RN, from 1 September 1944
- Lieutenant(A) C. Malins, RNVR, (temp), from 12 February 1945
- Lieutenant Commander(A) D.J. McDonald, RN, from 29 April 1945 (KiFA 30 May 1945)
- Lieutenant(A) M.B. Gerrish, RNVR, (temp), from (30 May 1945)
- Lieutenant Commander(A) K. Stilliard, RNVR, from (29 June 1945)
- Lieutenant Commander(A) C.F. Hargreaves, RN, from 6 December 1945
- disbanded - 13 August 1946

Note: Abbreviation (A) signifies Air Branch of the RN or RNVR.

== See also ==
- British Pacific Fleet
