= HMS Venerable (R63) =

1945 Colossus-class aircraft carrier of the Royal Navy

- HMS Venerable

History

United Kingdom
- Name: HMS Venerable
- Ordered: 7 August 1942
- Builder: Cammell Laird
- Yard number: 1126
- Laid down: 3 December 1942
- Launched: 30 December 1943
- Commissioned: 17 January 1945
- Decommissioned: April 1947
- Identification: Pennant number R63
- Fate: Sold to the Netherlands 1 April 1948

Netherlands
- Name: HNLMS Karel Doorman
- Namesake: Karel Doorman
- Acquired: 1 April 1948
- Commissioned: 28 May 1948
- Decommissioned: 29 April 1968
- Refit: 1955-1958; 1965-1966
- Identification: R81
- Fate: Sold to Argentina 15 October 1968

Argentina
- Name: ARA Veinticinco de Mayo
- Namesake: Date of the May Revolution
- Acquired: 15 October 1968
- Commissioned: 12 March 1969
- Decommissioned: 1997
- Out of service: Inoperable by 1990
- Refit: 1969
- Home port: Puerto Belgrano Naval Base
- Identification: V-2
- Fate: Provided spare parts for Minas Gerais and remainder was scrapped at Alang, India, in 2000

General characteristics
- Class & type: Colossus-class aircraft carrier
- Displacement: 13,190 long tons (13,400 t)
- Length: 695 ft (212 m) oa; 630 ft (192 m) pp
- Beam: 80 ft (24 m)
- Draught: 18 ft 6 in (5.64 m) (mean); 23 ft 6 in (7.16 m) (deep load)
- Propulsion: 2 × shafts; Parsons geared Steam turbines; 4 × Admiralty 3-drum boilers; 40,000 shp (30,000 kW)
- Speed: 25 kn (46 km/h; 29 mph)
- Range: 12,000 nmi (22,000 km; 14,000 mi) at 14 kn (26 km/h; 16 mph)
- Complement: 1,300 (including air group)
- Armament: 24 × QF 2-pounder naval gun (6 quadruple mounts); 32 × Oerlikon 20 mm cannon
- Aircraft carried: 48(52)

HMS Venerable (R63) was a Colossus-class aircraft carrier of the Royal Navy. She served for only the last few months of World War II, and in 1948 she was sold to the Netherlands and renamed HNLMS Karel Doorman, taking part in the military clash in 1962 in Western New Guinea. Subsequently, she was sold to Argentina and renamed ARA Veinticinco de Mayo, later taking part in the Falklands War.

== Description ==
The Colossus-class was developed to meet a need for more aircraft carriers to protect the fleets of the Royal Navy. As the major naval shipyards were already fully occupied, it was decided to design a simpler "Fighter Carrier" (which later became known as an "Intermediate Aircraft Carrier" and then a "Light Fleet Carrier), which would be quicker and cheaper to build than the existing Fleet Carriers, and by using commercial rather than naval standards for the ships' structures, could be built by commercial shipyards (including the merchant divisions of major shipyards).

Venerable was 695 ft (211.84 m) long overall, 650 ft (200 m) long at the waterline and 630 ft (192.02 m) between perpendiculars, with a beam at the waterline of 80 feet 0 inches (24.38 m) and an overall width of 112 feet 6 inches (34.29 m), and a mean draught of 18 ft 6 in (5.64 m), which increased to 23 ft 6 in (7.16 m) at deep load. Displacement was 13,190 long tons (13,400 t) standard and 18,040 long tons (18,330 t) at full load. The ship's flight deck was 690 ft (210.31 m) long and 75 ft (22.86 m) wide, and was made of mild steel. The flight deck was served by two centreline lifts with dimensions of 45 ft × 34 ft (14 m × 10 m) with a capacity of 15,000 lb (6,800 kg), and had a single aircraft catapult capable of launching 16,000 lb (7,300 kg) aircraft at 66 kn (76 mph; 122 km/h). Ten arrestor wires and two safety barriers were fitted. A single hangar was provided. The ship was powered by steam created by four Admiralty 3-drum type boilers driving two Parsons geared turbines, each turning one shaft. The machinery was laid out in a unit arrangement, with two sets of two boilers and a turbine being widely separated to minimise the potential for a single torpedo hit to completely disable the ship. The machinery was rated at 40,000 shaft horsepower (30,000 kW), giving a speed of 25 kn (29 mph; 46 km/h).

The carrier could operate 42 aircraft when built, while 84 aircraft could be carried when the carrier was used as an aircraft ferry. Defensive armament of the Colossus-class was limited to short-range anti-aircraft guns, with Venerable being fitted with six quadruple 2-pounder (40 mm) "pom-pom" autocannon, backed up by 11 twin and 10 single 20 mm Oerlikon cannon. Four 3-pounder saluting guns were also fitted. Armour was limited to steel mantlets over torpedo warheads, although extensive subdivision of designed to minimise the effects of flooding. The ship had a crew of 1300 officers and other ranks.

== Construction and career ==
HMS Venerable was ordered on 7 August 1942 as Admiralty Job number J3697, and was laid down at Cammell Laird in Birkenhead as yard number 1126 on 3 December 1942. The ship was launched on 30 December 1943 and was commissioned on 17 January 1945. Venerable's build time of 25 months was the shortest of the class.

After sea trials and working up the ship's crew, the carrier's air group, 1851 Naval Air Squadron, equipped with Vought Corsair fighters and 814 Naval Air Squadron, with Fairey Barracuda torpedo bombers, embarked and Venerable joined the 11th Aircraft Carrier Squadron, intended for operations with the British Pacific Fleet. Venerable, together with sister ships Colossus and Vengeance left British waters on 12 March 1945. The three carriers carried out intensive training operations in the Mediterranean until 28 May 1945, when they left for the Far East. The three carriers reached Australia in July 1945, where Indomitable and Glory joined the squadron.

The Surrender of Japan changed plans to use the 11th Carrier Squadron for strikes against Japan, with Venerable, together with Indomitable, the battleship Anson, the cruisers Black Prince and Swiftsure, were sent to take the surrender of Japanese forces at Hong Kong. On 31 August, aircraft from Venerable and Indomitable were launched to destroy Japanese suicide boats that had sortied against the British force, with other boats hidden north of Hong Kong Island also being attacked. Japanese forces in Hong Kong formally surrendered on 2 September. Landing parties from Venerable were used to help restore British rule to Hong Kong, duties including guarding a POW camp set up at Whitfield Barracks to hold Japanese personnel. In October 1945, Venerable repatriated Indian ex-prisoners of war from Haiphong, Vietnam to Madras, Transport and repatriation duties continued for the rest of the year before the ship was refitted at Garden Island, Sydney in January–February 1946.

After the refit, Venerable returned to service as a carrier of the British Pacific Fleet, with the same squadrons embarked, although 814 Squadron's Barracudas had been replaced by Fairey Firefly fighter-reconnaissance aircraft. In April Venerable temporarily returned to transport duties, replacing the escort carrier Speaker which had mechanical problems with her boilers. Trooping duties continued until the end of June 1946, while 1851 Squadron transferred to Vengeance in the same month, being replaced by the Supermarine Seafires of 802 Naval Air Squadron which embarked in September that year.

In February 1947, Venerable ended her service with the British Pacific Fleet and set out to return to Britain, arriving at Plymouth Sound on 26 March 1947. She was decommissioned at Devonport on 1 April that year. While Venerable had been in service for less than three years, the Royal Navy was in the process of demobilising after the end of the Second World War, and the carrier was placed in reserve and placed on the Disposal List.

== Royal Netherlands Navy ==
The Royal Netherlands Navy had a requirement to replace the escort carrier Karel Doorman (formerly the British HMS Nairana), and in January 1948, Venerable started a refit at Devonport to prepare the carrier for her potential new owner. The purchase was completed on 1 April 1948, and the carrier was commissioned into the Royal Netherlands Navy as HNLMS Karel Doorman. Karel Doorman continued in use until 1968, when she suffered a serious fire and was laid up, before being purchased by Argentina.

== Argentine Navy ==
After repair, the carrier was commissioned into the Argentine Navy as the ARA Veinticinco de Mayo. Veinticinco de Mayo remained in service during the Falklands War in 1982, although the threat of British submarines resulted in the carrier being withdrawn to port after the sinking of the cruiser General Belgrano. By 1988, Veinticinco de Mayo' machinery was in poor condition, and the carrier entered a refit, but this was never completed, and she subsequently provided spare parts for her sister ship, Minas Gerais. The remaining part of the ship was scrapped at the Alang Ship Breaking Yard, India, in 2000.
