= 11th Aircraft Carrier Squadron =

Former aircraft carrier formation of the Royal Navy

- Active: 1 March–December 1945
- Country: United Kingdom
- Allegiance: British Empire
- Branch: Royal Navy
- Size: Squadron
- Part of: British Pacific Fleet

Commanders
- Notable commanders: Rear Admiral Cecil Harcourt, RN

The 11th Aircraft Carrier Squadron, also called Eleventh Aircraft Carrier Squadron, was a military formation of aircraft carriers of the Royal Navy (RN) from 1 March 1945 to December 1945.

== History ==
The 11th Aircraft Carrier Squadron was established 1 March 1945 and assigned to the British Pacific Fleet until December 1945 when it was disbanded.

== Administration ==
=== Rear-Admiral, Commanding 11th Aircraft Carrier Squadron ===
Included:

| | Rank | Flag | Name | Term | Notes |
|---|---|---|---|---|---|
Rear-Admiral, Commanding 11th Aircraft Carrier Squadron
| 1 | Rear-Admiral | Rear-Admiral - Royal Navy | Cecil Harcourt | 1 March 1945 to December 1945 | |

== Composition 11th Aircraft Carrier Squadron ==
Included:

(United Kingdom) : 11th Aircraft Carrier Squadron; British Pacific Fleet March to December 1945
| Ship | Dates | Notes/Ref |
|---|---|---|
| HMS Indomitable | March to December 1945 | (Flagship till August 1945) |
| HMS Colossus | March to December 1945 | (Flagship from August–December 1945) |
| HMS Glory | March to December 1945 | |
| HMS Venerable | March to December 1945 | |
| HMS Vengeance | March to December 1945 | |

== See also ==
- List of squadrons and flotillas of the Royal Navy

== Sources ==
- Brown, J. D. (2009). Carrier Operations in World War II. Barnsley, England: Seaforth Publishing. ISBN 9781848320420.
- Hobbs, David. "The Royal Navy's Pacific Strike Force | U.S. Naval Institute". www.usni.org. Naval History Magazine, Volume 27, No 1, United States Naval Institute, December 2013.
- Watson, Dr Graham. "Royal Navy Organisation and Ship Deployment 1947-2013". www.naval-history.net. Gordon Smith, 12 July 2015.
