= Terence Percy =

Royal Navy officer (1919–2015)

Terence Percy

Terence "Pablo" Gerard Vaughan Percy DSC (29 August 1919 – 19 January 2015) was a Royal Navy officer of the Second World War in command of 848 Naval Air Squadron on the carrier HMS Formidable. The squadron flew Grumman Avenger torpedo bombers and returning from a raid over Okinawa in May 1945, Percy was lucky to escape a Japanese Kamikaze attack on the Formidable in which his wingman died. Percy was awarded the Distinguished Service Cross for his many sorties during this time. In 1942 he had also been fortunate to escape when he was forced to ditch his aircraft in the North Sea due to mechanical failure. On another occasion he narrowly escaped a V1 rocket attack.

After the war, Percy became secretary of the Royal Golf Club of Belgium at Chateau de Ravenstein.
