= HMS Glory (R62) =

1945 Colossus-class aircraft carrier of the Royal Navy

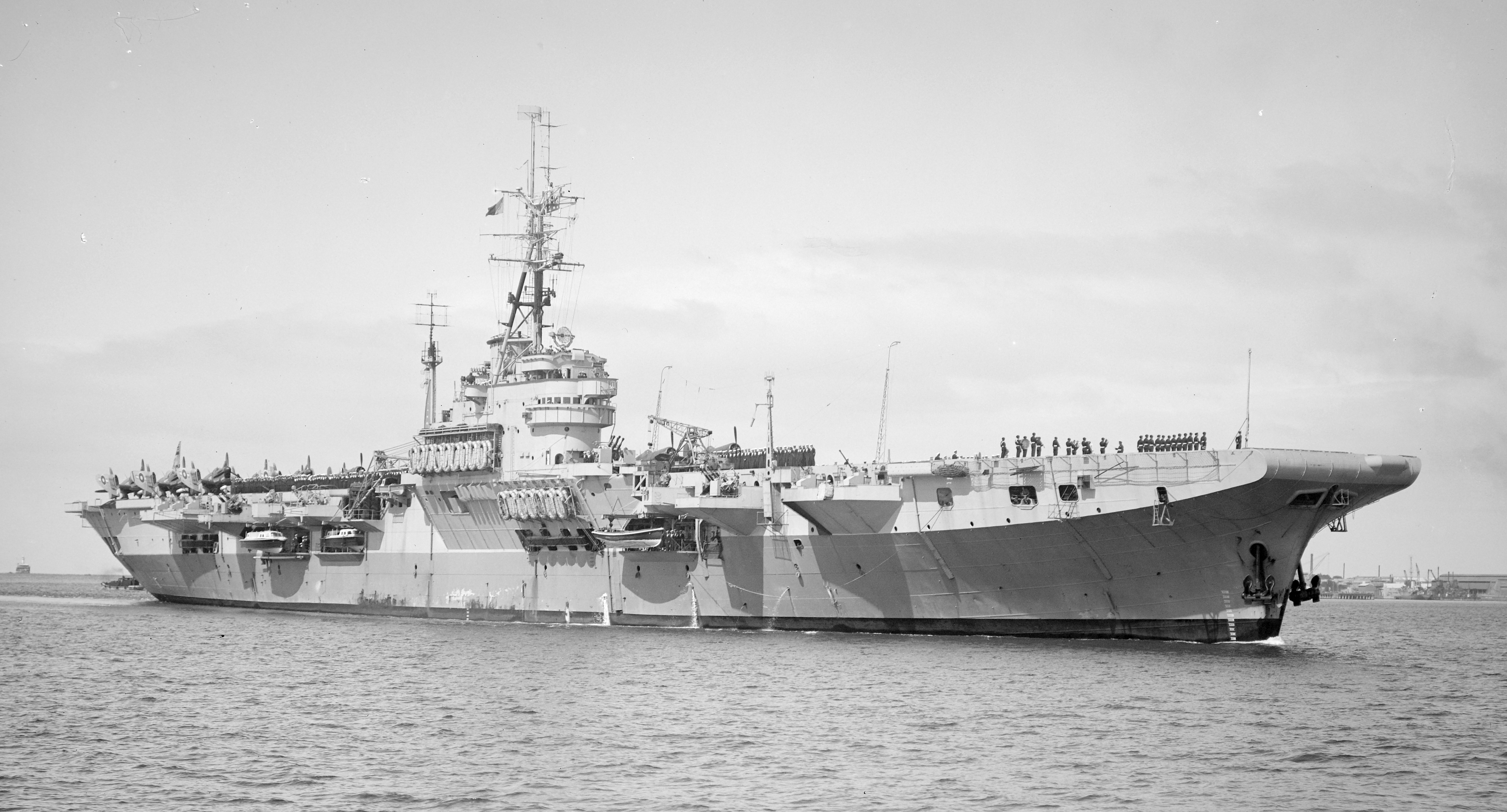

History

United Kingdom
- Name: Glory
- Builder: Harland & Wolff, Belfast
- Laid down: 27 August 1942
- Launched: 27 November 1943
- Commissioned: 2 April 1945
- Decommissioned: 1956
- Fate: Scrapped in Inverkeithing, Scotland 1961

General characteristics
- Class & type: Colossus-class aircraft carrier
- Displacement: 13,190 long tons (13,400 t)
- Length: 695 ft (212 m) oa; 630 ft (192 m) pp
- Beam: 80 ft (24 m)
- Draught: 18 ft 6 in (5.64 m) (mean); 23 ft 6 in (7.16 m) (deep load)
- Propulsion: 2 × shafts; Parsons geared steam turbines; 4 × Admiralty 3-drum boilers; 40,000 shp (30,000 kW)
- Speed: 25 kn (46 km/h; 29 mph)
- Range: 12,000 nmi (22,000 km; 14,000 mi) at 14 kn (26 km/h; 16 mph)
- Complement: 1,300 (including air group)
- Armament: 24 × QF 2-pounder naval guns (6 quadruple mounts); 32 × Oerlikon 20 mm cannon
- Aircraft carried: 48

HMS Glory (R62) was a Colossus-class aircraft carrier of the British Royal Navy laid down on 27 August 1942 by Harland & Wolff at Belfast. She was launched on 27 November 1943 by Lady Cynthia Brooke, wife of the Prime Minister of Northern Ireland.

== Operational service ==
The ship was commissioned on 2 April 1945, and left for the Pacific with an air wing of Barracudas (837 Naval Air Squadron) and Corsairs (1831 Naval Air Squadron). At Sydney, she joined the 11th Aircraft Carrier Squadron of the British Pacific Fleet as the war was ending. Glory under the command of Anthony Wass Buzzard came to Rabaul shortly thereafter on 6 September 1945 to accept the surrender of the Japanese garrison there.

One member of her crew on this first voyage was Charles Causley, the Cornish poet and broadcaster, who served as a Chief Petty Officer Coder. In 1945, whilst serving in Glory, he wrote the poem 'The Song of the Dying Gunner AA1' He published two further poems about the ship and this period: 'HMS Glory' (a description, in the ship's personified own 'voice', of Belfast and of its departure from that city for the Far East) and 'HMS Glory at Sydney' (a longer piece from the writer's own perspective reminiscing about his experience of the ship's spell in Australia, and his shipmates). In various prose pieces, he also describes several other aspects and episodes of the time, such as the Japanese surrender.

After the surrender at Rabaul, Glory assisted in the retaking of Hong Kong, and then sailed to Australia and Canada to return Commonwealth troops to their respective countries. The ship returned to the United Kingdom in 1947 and was then placed in reserve. In November 1949, the ship was taken out of reserve and fully returned to service just over a year later in December 1950.

Glory then deployed to Korea in April 1951 for the first of three wartime deployments. The first deployment ended in September of that year, but Glory was back on station from January to May 1952 and November 1952 to May 1953. After the very active service of the Korean War, Glory saw out 1954 as a ferry, troop carrier and helicopter base. 1956 was the end of the ship's active career, as she was placed in reserve. In 1961, Glory was sold to Thos. W. Ward for scrapping at Inverkeithing.

== Saluting guns ==
Whilst in reserve at Rosyth, four guns were removed and supplied to HMS Caledonia for use as a saluting battery. The four guns were described as "Ordnance, quick firing, Hotchkiss, 3 pdr, Mark 1" and were dated as being manufactured in 1888, 1898, 1904 & 1915. These guns were used by the apprentices in HMS Caledonia to salute visiting royalty and ships until the closure of the Marine Engineering School in 1985. HMS Caledonia (1946 shore establishment) was an artificers' training establishment commissioned in 1946 and paid off in 1985.

== Gallery ==
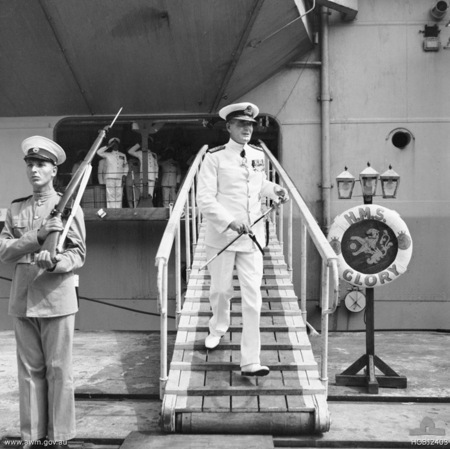
Vice Admiral Sir Guy Russell, Commander in Chief Far East Station, leaves his flagship Glory in Kure, Japan, September 1951

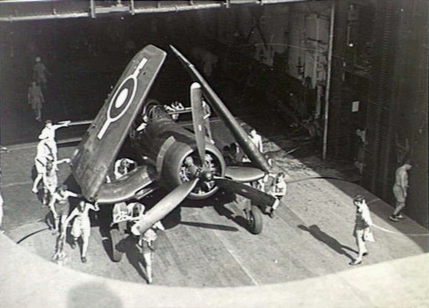
An 1831 Sqn Corsair aboard Glory, off Rabaul, 1945.

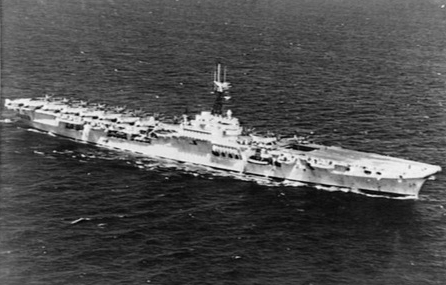
Glory off Korea in 1951

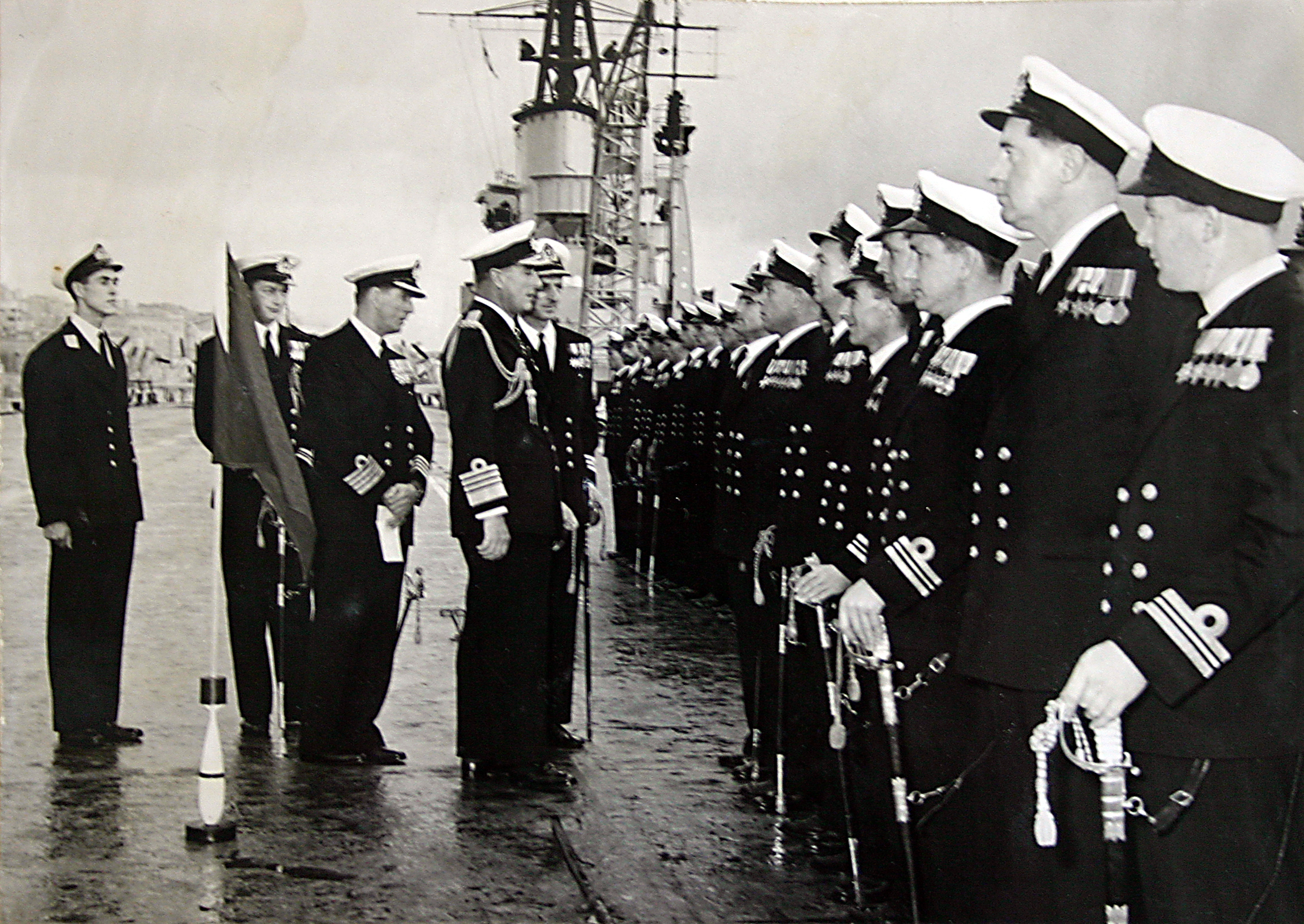
Admiral Lord Mountbatten inspecting the officers of Glory on the flight deck in 1954

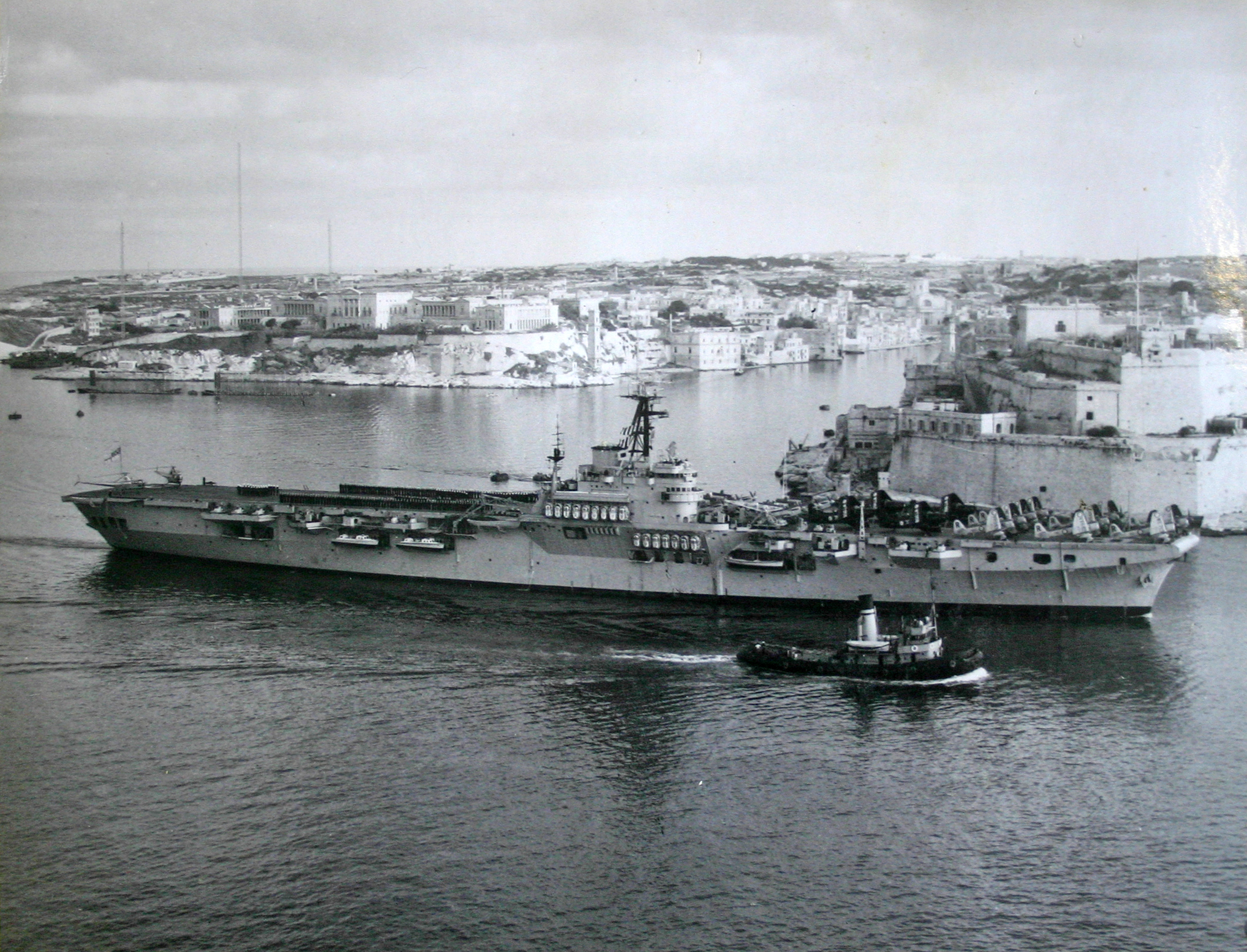
Glory in the Grand Harbour, Valletta, Malta in 1954

== Publications ==
- Colledge, J. J.; Warlow, Ben (2006) [1969]. Ships of the Royal Navy: The Complete Record of All Fighting Ships of the Royal Navy from the 15th Century to the Present (3rd Rev ed.). London: Chatham Publishing. ISBN 978-1-86176-281-8. OCLC 67375475.
- Chesneau, Roger (1998). Aircraft Carriers of the World, 1914 to the Present: An Illustrated Encyclopedia. London: Brockhamton Press. ISBN 1-86019-87-5-9.
- Gardiner, Robert; Chesneau, Roger (1980). Conway's All The World's Fighting Ships 1922–1946. London: Conway Maritime Press. ISBN 0-85177-146-7.
