= HMS Vengeance (R71) =

1945 Colossus-class aircraft carrier

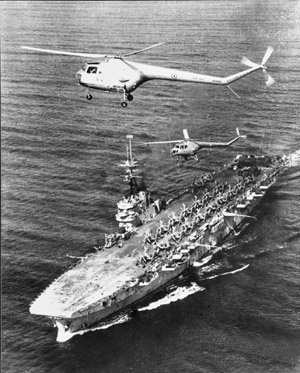
- The aircraft carrier Vengeance, during her loan to the Royal Australian Navy

History

United Kingdom
- Name: Vengeance
- Builder: Swan Hunter, Tyne and Wear, United Kingdom
- Laid down: 16 November 1942
- Launched: 23 February 1944
- Completed: 15 January 1945
- Commissioned: 1945
- Decommissioned: 1952
- Fate: Loaned to Royal Australian Navy

Australia
- Name: Vengeance
- Commissioned: 13 November 1952
- Decommissioned: 25 October 1955
- Reclassified: Training ship (1954–1955)
- Motto: "I Strike I Cover"
- Fate: Returned to Royal Navy, then sold to Brazilian Navy
- Badge

Brazil
- Name: Minas Gerais
- Acquired: 14 December 1956
- Commissioned: 6 December 1960
- Decommissioned: 16 October 2001
- Fate: Scrapped 2004

General characteristics (RN/RAN service)
- Class & type: Colossus-class light aircraft carrier
- Displacement: 13,190 tons standard; 18,040 tons full load
- Length: 695 ft (212 m)
- Beam: 80 ft (24 m)
- Draught: 23.5 ft (7.2 m)
- Propulsion: Parsons geared turbines, 2 shafts, 42,000 shp (31,000 kW)
- Speed: 24.5 knots (45.4 km/h; 28.2 mph)
- Range: 6,200 nautical miles (11,500 km; 7,100 mi) at 23 knots (43 km/h; 26 mph)
- Complement: 1,076
- Armament: Initial: 6 × quadruple QF 2 pounder naval guns; 19 × Oerlikon 20 mm cannon; 1945: 6 × quadruple 2-pounder guns; 8 × Bofors 40 mm guns; 11 × Oerlikons; 1952: 12 × Bofors; 32 × Oerlikons
- Aircraft carried: 30–40
- Notes: Taken from:

HMS Vengeance (R71) was a Colossus-class light aircraft carrier built for the Royal Navy during World War II. The carrier served in three navies during her career: the Royal Navy, the Royal Australian Navy (as HMAS Vengeance, from 1952 to 1955), and the Brazilian Navy (as NAeL Minas Gerais, from 1956 to 2001).

Constructed during World War II, Vengeance was one of the few ships in her class to be completed before the war's end, but she did not see active service. The ship spent the next few years as an aircraft transport and training carrier before she was sent on an experimental cruise to learn how well ships and personnel could function in extreme Arctic conditions. In late 1952, Vengeance was loaned to the Royal Australian Navy (RAN) as a replacement for the delayed aircraft carrier HMAS Melbourne. She remained in Australian waters, operating as an aircraft carrier and training ship, for the majority of her three-year loan, and was returned to the Royal Navy (RN) in August 1955.

Instead of returning to RN service, the carrier was sold in 1956 to Brazil, and entered service after major upgrades, which allowed the ship to operate jet aircraft. Renamed Minas Gerais, the carrier remained in operation until 2001. Several attempts were made to sell the ship, including a listing on eBay, before she was sold for scrap and taken to Alang for breaking up.

== Design and construction ==
Vengeance was constructed by Swan Hunter. She was laid down on 16 November 1942, and launched on 23 February 1944. Construction was completed on 15 January 1945, and Vengeance was commissioned into the RN.

The Colossus-class carriers were intended to be 'disposable warships': they were to be operated during World War II and scrapped at the end of hostilities or within three years of entering service. Despite this prediction, Vengeance had a service life of over 55 years.

=== Weapons and systems ===
Her initial armament consisted of six quadruple QF 2 pounder naval guns (known as pom-poms) and 19 Oerlikon 20 mm cannon. In 1945, after being assigned to the British Pacific Fleet, eight of the Oerlikons were replaced with eight single Bofors 40 mm guns; these guns provided better protection against Japanese kamikaze aircraft.

When commissioned into the RAN in 1952, the weapons outfit included 12 Bofors 40 mm guns and 32 Oerlikon 20 mm cannon.

=== Aircraft ===
During her service in the RAN, Vengeance carried a squadron each of Hawker Sea Furies and Fairey Fireflies. The carrier's air group included three Bristol Sycamore, acquired by the RAN after observing the performance of a United States Navy Sycamore operating from HMAS Sydney during her Korean War deployment. Although not the first helicopters to see military service in Australia (that title belonging to a Sikorsky S-51 of the Royal Australian Air Force), the Sycamores formed the first Australian military helicopter squadron, and led to the establishment of Australia's first helicopter pilot school. All three helicopters were brought out from England aboard Vengeance.

== Operational history ==
=== RN service ===
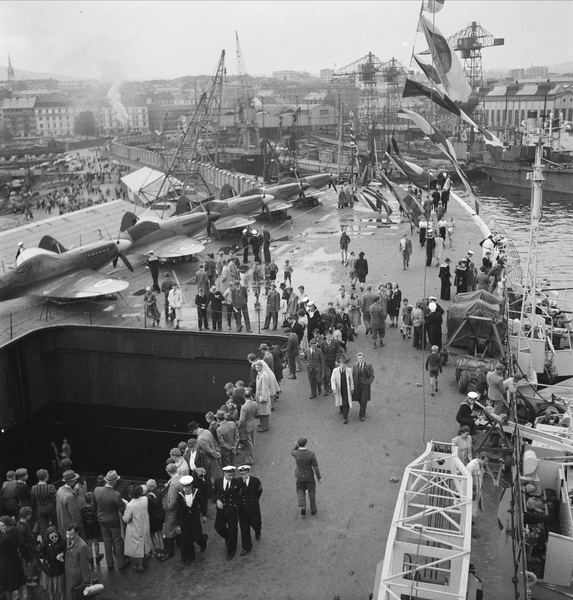
HMS Vengeance visiting Oslo in 1947

On 11 March 1945, Vengeance left the River Clyde for working-up trials in Malta. These were completed by 21 May, when she was assigned to the 11th Aircraft Carrier Squadron of the British Pacific Fleet. The carrier sailed to Sydney via Alexandria, Port Said, Trincomalee, and Fremantle, arriving on 26 July. While alongside in Sydney, eight Oerlikons were replaced with eight single Bofors 40 mm guns; these guns provided better protection against Japanese kamikaze aircraft. Vengeance was assigned to Task Group 111.2 of the British Pacific Fleet, and was to be deployed as part of the force attacking Japanese-held Truk, but did not leave Sydney until the war ended. Following the end of the war Vengeance was ordered to Hong Kong, and on 3 September was used as the venue for the Japanese surrender of the territory.

She remained in the area until the end of 1945, sailed to Australia for a refit, then returned to Hong Kong. In April 1946, Vengeance delivered No. 11 and No. 17 Squadrons of the Royal Air Force to Miho Air Base in Japan, where they were assigned as part of British Commonwealth Occupation Force. Vengeance remained in Eastern waters until 20 July 1946, when she departed for England. The ship arrived at Devonport on 13 August after visiting Trincomalee, and at the end of the year was reassigned as a Scotland-based training carrier.

Vengeance visited Oslo and Trondheim in June 1947, with First Sea Lord Sir John Cunningham aboard. During early 1948, the carrier was attached to the 3rd Aircraft Carrier Squadron, part of the British Home Fleet. She visited St Helena in October, and cruised with the Squadron in South African waters until mid-November. On her return to the UK, Vengeance was converted for Arctic conditions, and from 5 February 1949 to 8 March 1949 operated in Arctic waters as part of Operation Rusty: an experimental cruise to determine how well ships, aircraft, and personnel functioned in extreme cold.

=== Loan to Australia ===
In June 1951, following the receipt of advice that the Australian aircraft carrier HMAS Melbourne would not be completed until at least March 1954, the Australian Defence Committee recommended that Australia request the RN loan a carrier to the RAN. The new predicted date of completion for Melbourne was 21 months later than previous predictions, on which the establishment of two-carrier naval aviation in the RAN had been dependent. The Navy sought a four-year loan of an aircraft carrier from late 1952 to late 1956, to cover both the delays with Melbourne and the planned upgrading of HMAS Sydney once Melbourne was in service. The Australian government proposed that the loaned carrier be modified to operate both Sea Venom and Gannet aircraft, so that Melbourne and the loaned carrier could both see active service while Sydney was upgraded, but withdrew the suggestion when informed by the Admiralty that providing such capability would require the installation of a new arrestor cable system, prevent the loaned carrier from entering service until at least March 1954, and would be paid for entirely by Australia. Several smaller modifications were approved and paid for by Australia, including the installation of additional aircrew accommodation.

Vengeance was the carrier selected for the loan, and modifications for Australian service were completed in January 1952. In order to provide personnel for the loaned carrier, the RAN had to place the light cruiser HMAS Hobart into reserve. The loan was approved, with the British government choosing not to charge Australia for the loan, but stating that all operational costs would be met by the RAN, including the initial outfit of stores. In mid-1952, the liner Asturias was chartered by the RAN to transport a commissioning crew to England.

=== RAN service ===
Vengeance was transferred to the Royal Australian Navy on 13 November 1952. She was recommissioned as an Australian ship on this date, and received the prefix HMAS. Departing from Devonport at the end of 1952, the carrier sailed to Australia via the Mediterranean, and arrived in Fremantle on 26 February 1953. She reached Sydney in March, and was marked as fully operational in June. In late 1953, Vengeance was prepared for a deployment to Korea, to support the United Nations enforcement of the July 1953 armistice. The deployment did not go ahead: HMAS Sydney was sent instead.

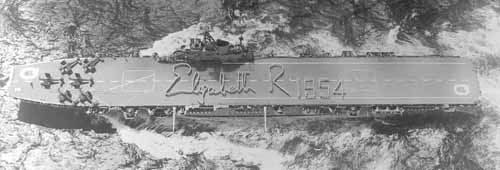
The ship's company of Vengeance, arranged on the flight deck to recreate the signature of Queen Elizabeth II

From February until April 1954, Vengeance was tasked with escorting the royal yacht Gothic through Australian waters during the Royal Visit of Queen Elizabeth II to Australia. On 9 March 1954, while in Port Philip Bay, a whaler transporting 30 sailors to the carrier hit a series of freak waves and capsized. Two sailors were killed. Navy divers were involved in rescuing the survivors, with one earning the British Empire Medal for his efforts. On 3 April, while escorting Gothic to the Cocos Islands with the destroyers Bataan and Anzac accompanying, Vengeance's ship's company assembled on the flight deck and positioned themselves to form the Queen's signature. After later seeing an aerial photograph of this, Her Majesty had a message sent to the carrier, saying "Thank you for the original forgery." On 5 April, after arriving at the Cocos Islands, Vengeance was involved in a collision with Bataan while the destroyer attempted to refuel from the carrier. Bataan's bow made contact with Vengeance's side, but the damage was minor, and both ships returned to Sydney in May without assistance, after visiting Manus Island and Rabaul.

In June 1954, Vengeance was removed from active service and reclassified as the RAN's primary training ship. The previous training ship, the cruiser HMAS Australia, had been earmarked in mid-1953 to be decommissioned and scrapped, as modernising her would have been uneconomical. At the same time, the RAN was exploring avenues to reduce operating costs: the reduction of naval aviation from two active carriers to one would provide significant savings. The removal of Vengeance from active service, combined with the need to find a replacement training ship for Australia which was large enough to accommodate the large number of National Service trainees, saw the carrier placed in the training role. On 31 August, Vengeance accompanied Australia during the latter's final voyage before decommissioning. The carrier sailed to Japan in late October; her first departure from Australian waters while in RAN service. Vengeance returned to Australia in November, after collecting No. 77 Squadron RAAF.

=== Return to Britain and sale to Brazil ===
In May 1955, Sydney assumed Vengeance's training carrier duties as well as her own flagship and operation duties, while the latter carrier was prepared for the return to England. Vengeance left for the UK in June, stopping in Singapore to collect a squadron of RN helicopters. Arriving on 13 August, her RAN crew prepared the carrier for reserve, and Vengeance was decommissioned on 25 October. The personnel were used as the first ship's company of Melbourne, which was commissioned on 28 October 1955.

Vengeance was not reactivated for RN use, and on 14 December 1956, the carrier was sold by the Admiralty to Brazil for US$9 million. From mid-1957 until December 1960, the carrier underwent a massive refit and reconstruction at Verolme Dock in Rotterdam, which cost US$27 million. Modifications included the installation of an 8.5-degree angled flight deck, a more powerful steam catapult, stronger arresting gear, reinforced hangar lifts and a mirror landing aid. This was to allow the operation of jet aircraft, which were larger, faster, and heavier than the propeller aircraft previously operated by the carrier. A new superstructure was fitted, including a large lattice mast to support a new radar suite and fire control system. Boiler capacity was increased, and the internal electrics were converted to AC power. The length of the modernisation refit meant that while the carrier was the first purchased by a Latin American nation, she was the second to enter service; another Colossus-class carrier entered service with the Argentine Navy as ARA Independencia in July 1959.

The carrier was commissioned into the Marinha do Brasil (MB, Brazilian Navy) as NAeL Minas Gerais on 6 December 1960. She departed Rotterdam for Rio de Janeiro on 13 January 1961.

=== MB service ===
In 1965, President Humberto de Alencar Castelo Branco outlawed the operation of fixed-wing aircraft by the MB; this remained the responsibility of the Força Aérea Brasileira (FAB, Brazilian Air Force). As a result, Minas Gerais was required to embark two air groups: the Navy operated helicopters while the Air Force operated S-2 Tracker aircraft. Consequently, the ship spent most of her Brazilian career operating as an anti-submarine warfare carrier.

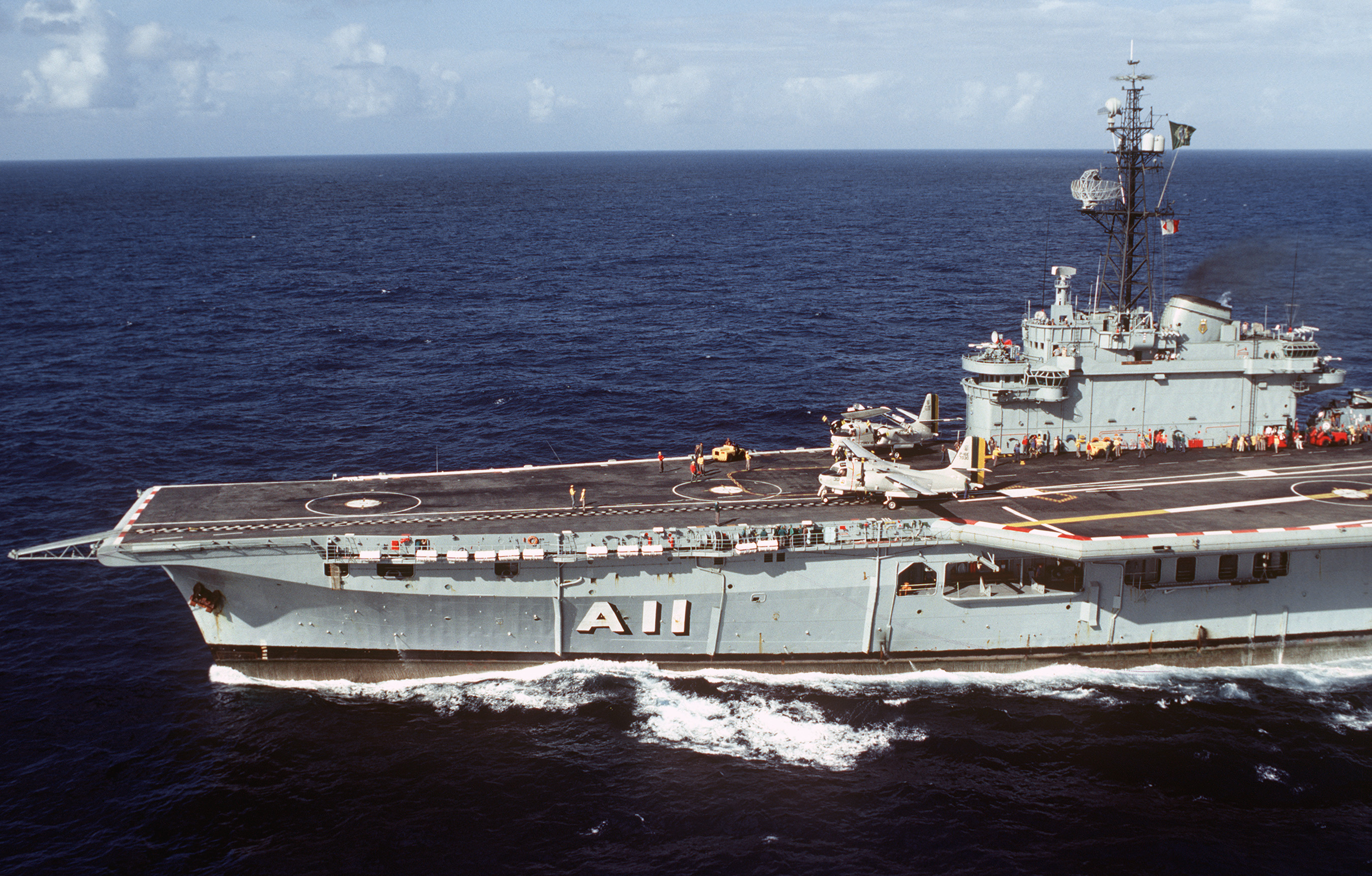
Minas Gerais underway during 1984

Minas Gerais underwent another major refit from 1976 to 1981, during which her radar suite was updated, datalinks were installed, and the ship's life expectancy was increased to the 1990s. From 1986, engine and funding problems saw the Argentine Navy's ARA Veinticinco de Mayo confined to port, making Minas Gerais the only operating carrier in the South American region.

From July 1991 to October 1993, the carrier underwent another modernisation refit; the work included refurbishment of her propulsion system, upgrades to the command and control system and radars, and replacement of the ship's Bofors with Mistral surface-to-air missiles. In 1999, the MB acquired 20 A-4KU Skyhawks and 3 TA-4KU trainer aircraft from the Kuwait Air Force; the first time since the carrier's commissioning that Forca Aeronaval da Marinha (Brazilian Navy Aviation) had been permitted to own and operate fixed-wing aircraft.

== Decommissioning and fate ==
Minas Gerais was decommissioned on 16 October 2001: the last of the World War II-era light aircraft carriers to leave service. At the time of her decommissioning, she was the oldest active aircraft carrier in the world (a title passed on to the 1961-commissioned USS Kitty Hawk). The carrier was marked for sale in 2002, and was actively sought after by British naval associations for return to England and preservation as a museum ship, although they were unable to raise the required money.

Just before Christmas 2003, the carrier was listed for sale on auction website eBay by a user claiming to be a shipbroker representing the owner. Bidding reached £4 million before the auction was removed from the website under rules preventing the sale of military ordnance. An auction in Rio de Janeiro in February 2004 also failed to sell the ship. Sometime between February and July 2004, the carrier was towed to the ship breaking yards at Alang, India, for dismantling.

== External links and further reading ==
- Lovelock, James (2001). Homage to Gaia: The Life of an Independent Scientist. Oxford: Oxford University Press. ISBN 0-19-860429-7. OCLC 47063313. – an autobiography by James Lovelock. The first part of chapter 4 (pp. 91–99) contains Lovelock's recount of the 1949 Vengeance voyage into Arctic waters.
- Friends of the Vengeance – the proposal to convert Vengeance/Minas Gerais into a museum ship.
