= Hawker Sea Fury =

Carrier-based fighter aircraft

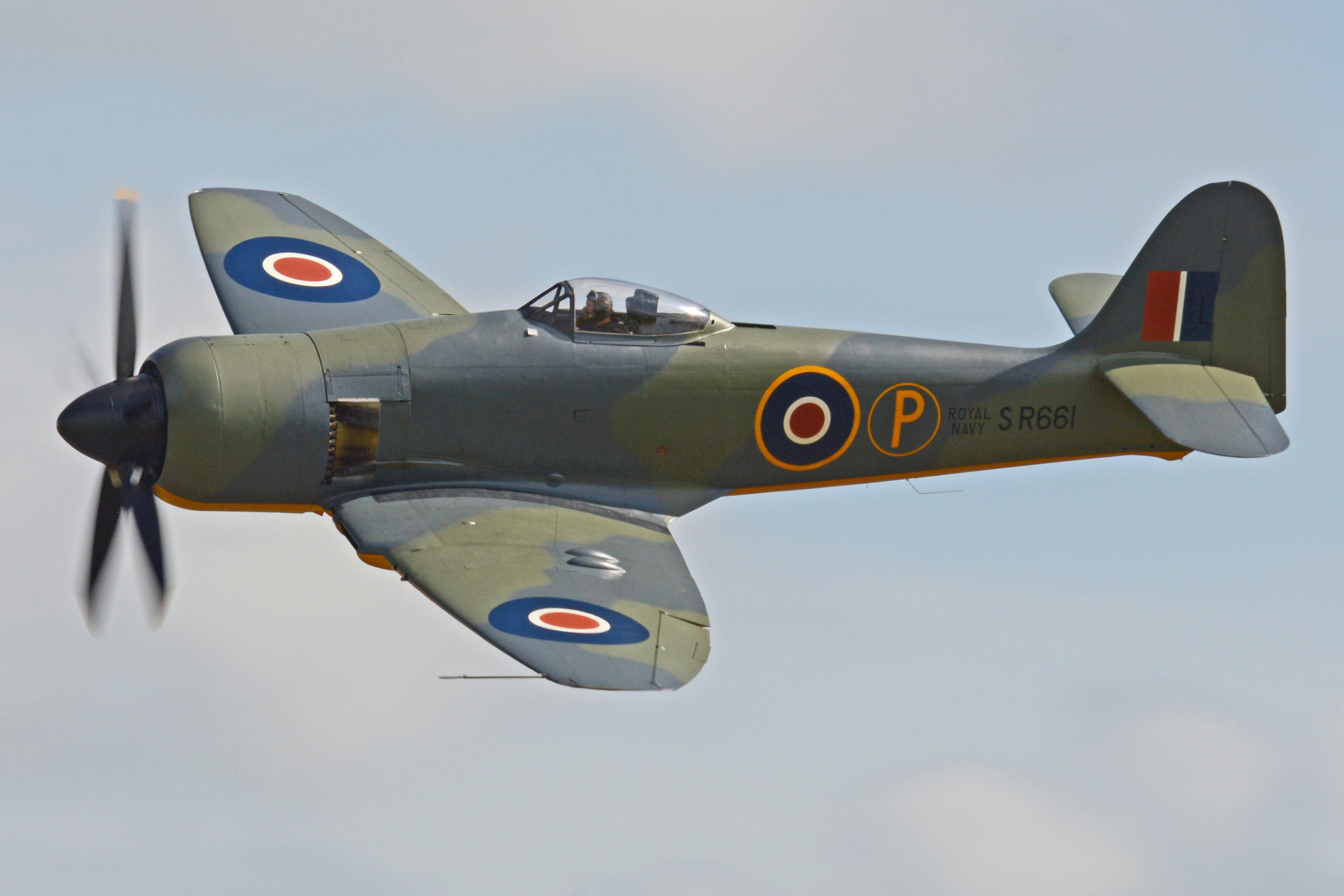
- A preserved ex-Iraqi Air Force Sea Fury FB.11 painted in the Royal Air Force livery at the 2016 Flying Legends airshow, Duxford, Cambridgeshire, UK

General information
- Type: Naval fighter-bomber
- National origin: United Kingdom
- Manufacturer: Hawker Aircraft
- Designer: Sydney Camm
- Primary users: Royal Navy Royal Australian Navy; Royal Canadian Navy; Royal Netherlands Navy
- Number built: 864

History
- Manufactured: 1945–1955
- Introduction date: August 1947 (RCN); September 1947 (RN)
- First flight: 1 September 1944 (Fury); 21 February 1945 (Sea Fury)
- Retired: 1953 (FAA); 1955 (RNVR); 1956 (RCN); 1957 (MLD); 1968 Burmese Air Force
- Developed from: Hawker Tempest

The Hawker Sea Fury is a British fighter aircraft designed and manufactured by Hawker Aircraft. It was the last propeller-driven fighter to serve with the Royal Navy. Developed during the Second World War, the Sea Fury entered service two years after the war ended. It proved to be a popular aircraft with overseas militaries and was used during the Korean War in the early 1950s and by the Cuban air force during the 1961 Bay of Pigs Invasion.

The development of the Sea Fury began in 1943 in response to a wartime requirement of the Royal Air Force (RAF), with the aircraft first named Fury. As the Second World War drew to a close, the RAF cancelled its order for the aircraft. The Royal Navy saw the type as a suitable carrier aircraft to replace a range of obsolescent and stop-gap aircraft being operated by the Fleet Air Arm. Development of the Sea Fury proceeded, and the type entered operational service in 1947.

The Sea Fury has many design similarities to Hawker's preceding Tempest fighter, having originated from a requirement for a "Light Tempest Fighter". The Sea Fury's wings and fuselage originated from the Tempest, but were significantly modified. The production Sea Fury was fitted with the powerful Bristol Centaurus engine and armed with four wing-mounted Hispano V cannons. While originally developed as a pure aerial fighter aircraft, the definitive Sea Fury FB.11 was a fighter-bomber.

The Sea Fury attracted international orders as both a carrier- and land-based aircraft. It was operated by countries including Australia, Burma, Canada, Cuba, Egypt, the Netherlands, West Germany, Iraq, and Pakistan. The type acquitted itself well in the Korean War, fighting effectively even against the MiG-15 jet fighter. Although the Sea Fury was retired by the majority of its military operators in the late 1950s in favour of jet-propelled aircraft, many aircraft saw use in the civil sector, and several remain airworthy in the 21st century as heritage and racing aircraft.

== Development ==
=== Origins ===
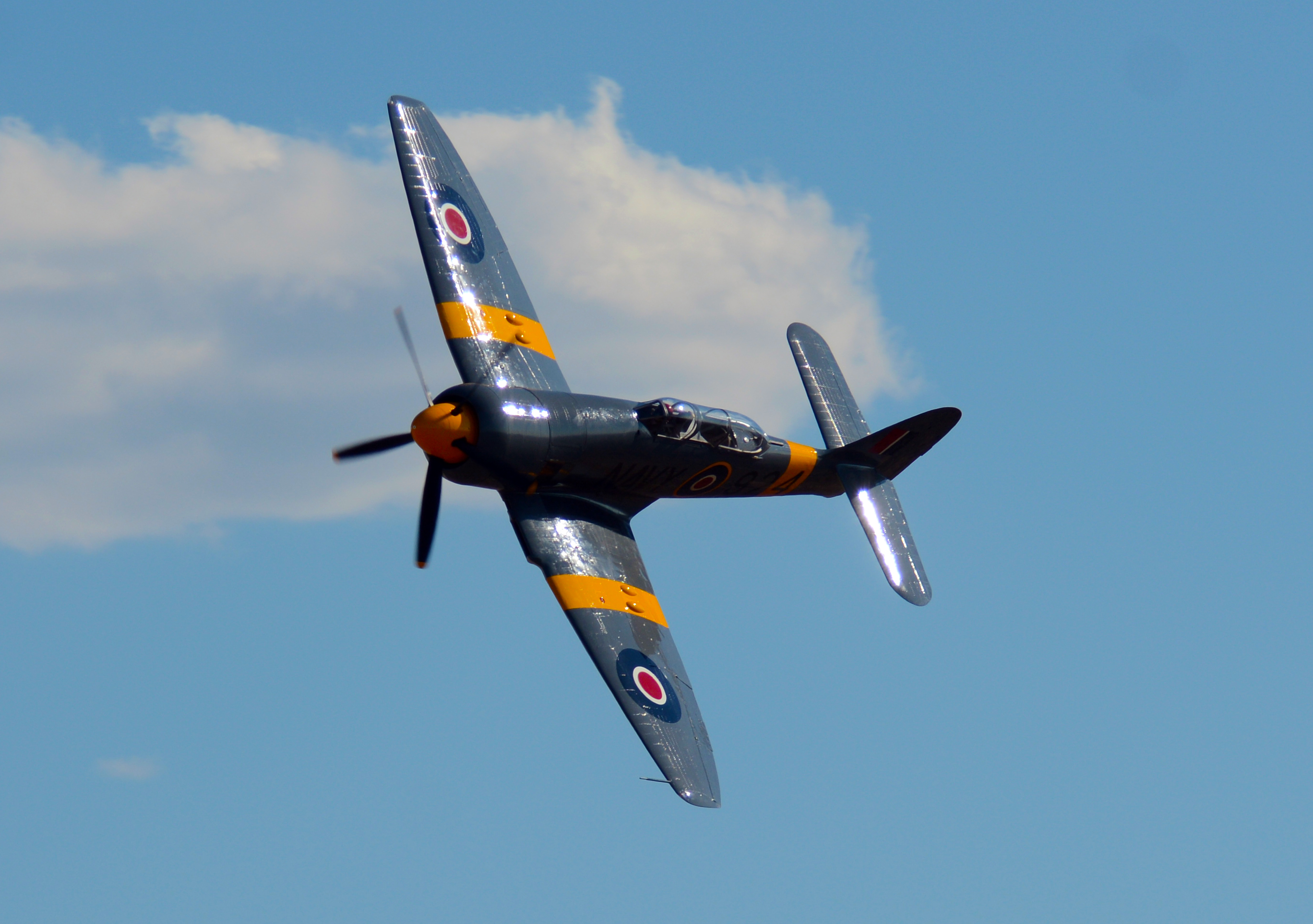
Sea Fury T.20 at 2014 Reno Air Races

The Hawker Fury was an evolutionary successor to the successful Hawker Typhoon and Tempest fighters and fighter-bombers of WWII. The Fury's design process was initiated in September 1942 by Sydney Camm, one of Hawker's foremost aircraft designers, to meet the Royal Air Force's requirement for a lightweight Tempest Mk II replacement; the Tempest, while a successful aircraft, had been viewed as being heavy and oversized for typical fighter duties. Developed as the "Tempest Light Fighter (Centaurus)", the semielliptical wing of the Tempest was incorporated, but was shortened in span by eliminating the central bay of the wing centre section, the inner part of the undercarriage wells now extending almost to the aircraft centre line, instead of being situated level with the fuselage sides. The fuselage was broadly similar in form to that of the Tempest, but was a fully monocoque structure, while the cockpit level was higher, affording the pilot better all-round visibility.

The project was formalised in January 1943 when the Air Ministry issued Specification F.2/42 around the "Tempest Light Fighter". This was followed up by Specification F.2/43, issued in May 1943, which required a high rate of climb of not less than 4,500 ft/min (23 m/s) from ground level to 20,000 feet (6,096 m), good fighting manoeuvrability, and a maximum speed of at least 450 mph (724 km/h) at 22,000 feet (6,705 m). The armament was to be four 20 mm Hispano V cannons with a total capacity of 600 rounds, plus the capability of carrying two bombs each up to 1,000 pounds (450 kg). In April 1943, Hawker had also received Specification N.7/43 from the Admiralty, who sought a carrier version of the developing aircraft; in response, Sidney Camm proposed the consolidation of both services' requirements under Specification F.2/43, with the alterations required for naval operations issued on a supplemental basis. Around 1944, the aircraft project finally received its name; the Royal Air Force's version became known as the Fury and the Fleet Air Arm's version as the Sea Fury.

Six prototypes were ordered; two were to be powered by Rolls-Royce Griffon engines, two with Centaurus XXIIs, one with a Centaurus XII, and one as a test structure. Hawker used the internal designations P.1019 and P.1020, respectively, for the Griffon and Centaurus versions, while P.1018 was also used for a Fury prototype, which was to use a Napier Sabre IV. The first Fury to fly, on 1 September 1944, was NX798 with a Centaurus XII with rigid engine mounts, powering a Rotol four-bladed propeller. Second on 27 November 1944 was LA610, which had a Griffon 85 and Rotol six-bladed contra-rotating propeller. By now, development of the Fury and Sea Fury was closely interlinked so that the next prototype to fly was a Sea Fury, SR661, described under "Naval version". NX802 (25 July 1945) was the last Fury prototype, powered by a Centaurus XV. LA610 was eventually fitted with a Napier Sabre VII, which was capable of developing 3,400 to 4,000 hp (2,535–2,983 kW); this aircraft became possibly the fastest reciprocating-engined Hawker aircraft after reaching a speed around 485 mph (780 km/h).

=== Naval version ===
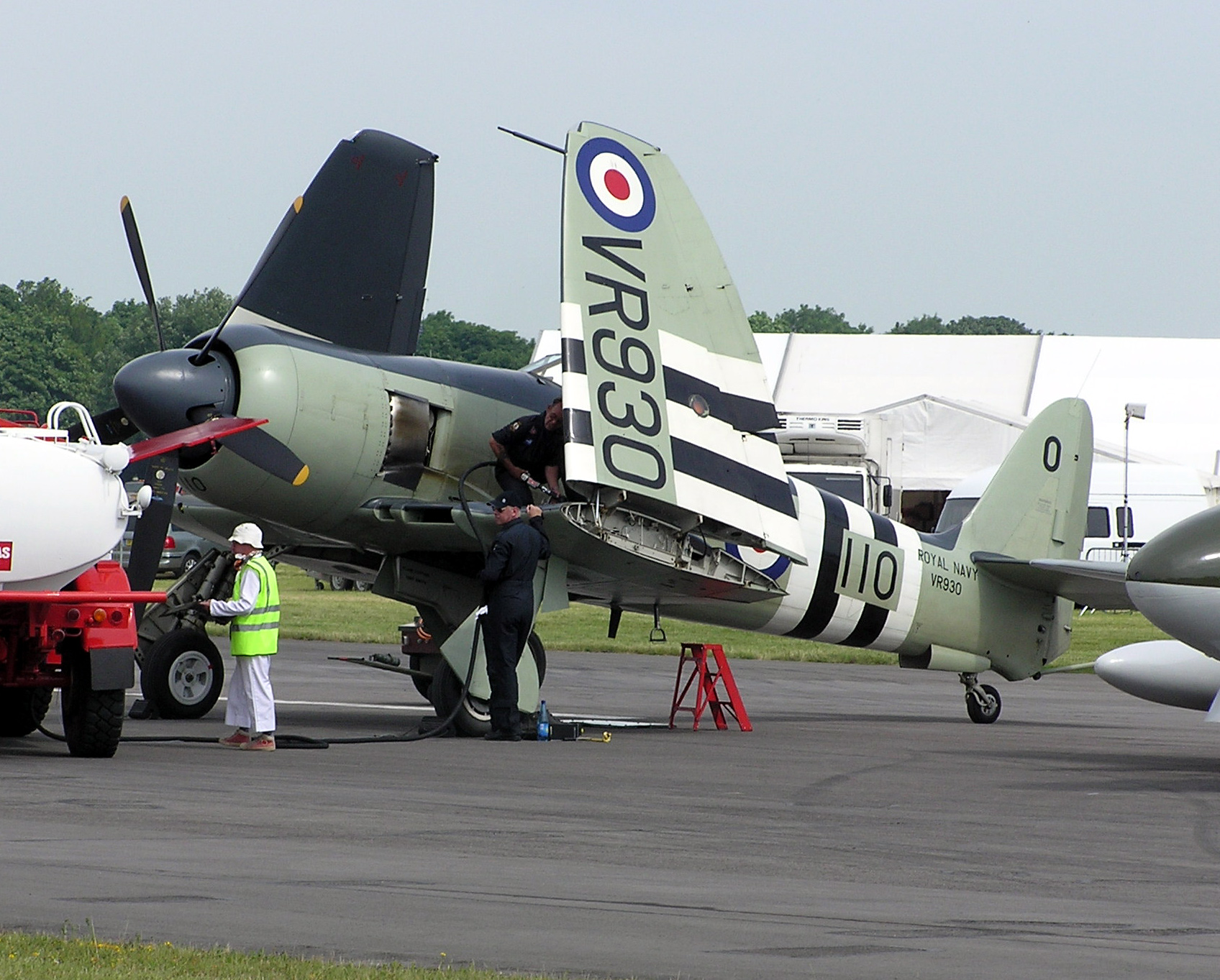
Sea Fury FB.11 VR930 with wings folded, at Kemble Airfield, Gloucestershire, England, operated by the Royal Navy Historic Flight

With the end of the Second World War in Europe in sight, the RAF began cancelling many aircraft orders; the RAF's order for the Fury was cancelled before any production aircraft were built because the RAF already had large numbers of late Mark Spitfires and Tempests and viewed the Fury as an unnecessary overlap with these aircraft. Although the RAF had pulled out of the programme, development of the type continued as the Sea Fury. Many of the Fleet Air Arm's carrier fighters were Seafires and Lend-Lease Corsairs. The Seafire had considerable drawbacks as a naval aircraft, notably the narrow undercarriage, while the Corsairs had to be returned or purchased. The Admiralty opted to procure the Sea Fury as the successor to these aircraft.

While the RAF contract had been cancelled, the Fury prototypes were completed and used for work in developing the Sea Fury, as well as for the export market. The first Sea Fury prototype, SR661, first flew at Langley, Berkshire, on 21 February 1945, powered by a Centaurus XII engine. This prototype had a "stinger"-type tailhook for arrested carrier landings, but lacked folding wings for storage. SR666, the second prototype, which flew on 12 October 1945, was powered by a Bristol Centaurus XV that turned a new, five-bladed Rotol propeller and had folding wings. Specification N.7/43 was modified to N.22/43, now representing an order for 200 aircraft. Of these, 100 were to be built at Boulton-Paul's Wolverhampton factory.

In 1945, the original order to specification N.22/43 was reduced to 100 aircraft; as a result, the manufacturing agreement with Boulton-Paul was ended and all work on the Sea Fury was transferred to Hawker Aircraft's facilities at Kingston. This included the construction of what was intended to be a Boulton-Paul-built Sea Fury prototype, VB857, which was transported to Kingston in January 1945; this aircraft, built to the same standard as SR666, first flew on 31 January 1946. Immediately upon completion of the first three airframes, the flight-testing programme began at Kingston. Testing soon discovered that the early Centaurus engines suffered frequent crankshaft failures due to their poorly designed lubrication system, which led to incidents of the engine seizing while in midflight. The problem was resolved when Bristol's improved Centaurus 18 engine replaced the earlier engine variant.

=== Into production ===
The first production model, the Sea Fury F Mk X (later Sea Fury F.10), flew in September 1946. With the completion of flight testing at Boscombe Down in 1946, the trials process was repeated aboard the aircraft carrier HMS Victorious. Carrier testing revealed directional stability issues related to rudder effectiveness during landing, and this was resolved by the adoption of a tailwheel lock, which also improved the wheel retraction behaviour. Several rectifying design changes were made by Hawker in response to feedback from the test pilots, including the adoption of a five-bladed Rotol propeller to greatly reduce overspeed tendencies; a redesigned rudder assembly, to increase rudder effectiveness, Dynafocal engine mountings to reduce vibration at low speeds, and an improved undercarriage with greater flexibility. These changes greatly improved the aircraft's deck landing characteristics. Arrestor-hook trials initially revealed the Sea Fury to be prone to missing the wires; this was rapidly resolved by modifications to the hook dampener mechanism.

By March 1947, production Sea Furies were being produced for the Fleet Air Arm. The fourth and sixth production aircraft were used in further trials with HMS Illustrious; the main change from the earlier aircraft was the adoption of a longer, stiffer arrestor hook. Fifty Mk X Sea Furies were produced. These were identical to the SR666 prototype except for the Centaurus 18 engine and a four-bladed propeller. At least 20 of the 50 aircraft performed in the aircraft's intensive trials programme. Following the successful completion of weapons trials at the A&AEE Boscombe Down, the Sea Fury was cleared for operational use on 31 July 1947.

Hawker Aircraft continued to develop and refine the Sea Fury Mk X, resulting in the more capable Sea Fury Mk 11, also known as the Sea Fury FB.11. This upgraded model had several improvements, most notable being the hydraulically powered wing-folding mechanism, which eased flight deck operations and the adoption of new weapons for air-to-ground combat. Iraq ordered a two-seat Sea Fury model, and the British Admiralty followed suit. During testing, the rear canopy collapsed, leading to a redesign of the type's two-seat cockpit before entering service. Designated as the Sea Fury T.20, 60 trainers were manufactured for the Fleet Air Arm between 1950 and 1952. The Royal Navy bought a total of 615 Sea Furies, mostly of the Mk 11 standard.

=== Export market ===
Hawker Aircraft was keen to market the Sea Fury to foreign operators, and conducted an intense sales drive for its export version of the aircraft, designated Sea Fury F.50. On 21 October 1946, the Royal Netherlands Navy placed an order for ten F.50 aircraft, which were basically identical to the FAA's Sea Fury Mk X aircraft, to equip the aircraft carrier HNLMS Karel Doorman (ex-HMS Nairana). The Dutch also ordered 12 of the later Fury FB.50s in 1948, and these were delivered in 1950. They were used on the aircraft carrier HNLMS Karel Doorman (ex-HMS Venerable). A manufacturing licence was also acquired for the production of 25 Sea Fury FB.51s by Fokker Aircraft in the Netherlands, which were delivered from 1951 onwards. (Note: Note on the Dutch serials: 10 stood for "J", short for Jager (English: hunter) as a fighter aircraft is referred to in Dutch. In the early 1950s, all serials were changed to 6 or "F" for "Fighter". The actual numbers remained unchanged.)

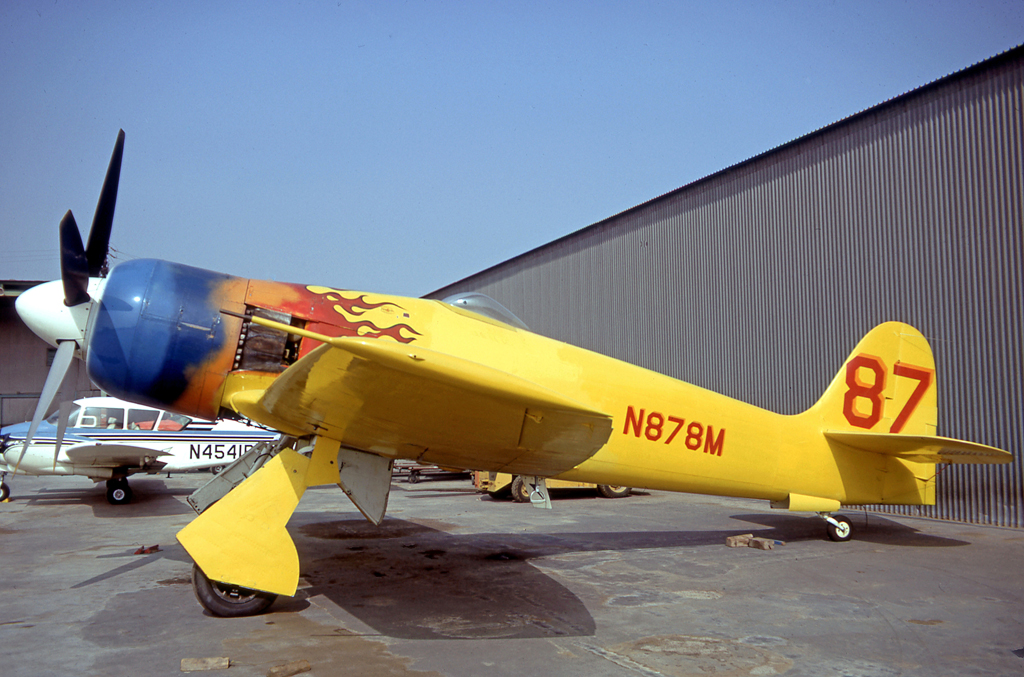
Sea Fury FB.11 Miss Merced modified for unlimited racing: It had previously served in the Royal Canadian Navy.

The Sea Fury became an export success, being purchased both to operate on aircraft carriers and for purely land-based roles by several nations, including Australia, West Germany, Iraq, Egypt, Burma, Pakistan, and Cuba. Several of the nations that did not have aircraft carriers often had the tail hooks and catapult hooks removed from their aircraft.

A final variant, the Sea Fury T.20S, was developed by Hawker for West Germany as target-tow aircraft; these remained in service into the 1970s. Upon the type's withdrawal from military service, many Sea Furies were sold to private individuals, often as racing aircraft due to their high speed. The final production figures for all marks reached around 860 aircraft.

The Finnish Air Force planned in 1952 to purchase 25 Sea Furies to replace its ageing and worn WWII-vintage Messerschmitt Bf 109Gs. The Sea Fury had sturdy landing gear and was well suited to the rough field conditions in Finland. In late 1952, the UK turned out to be willing to provide turbojet De Havilland Vampire fighters instead, so the Finnish Air Force purchased the Vampires, which arrived in Pori in 1953.

== Design ==
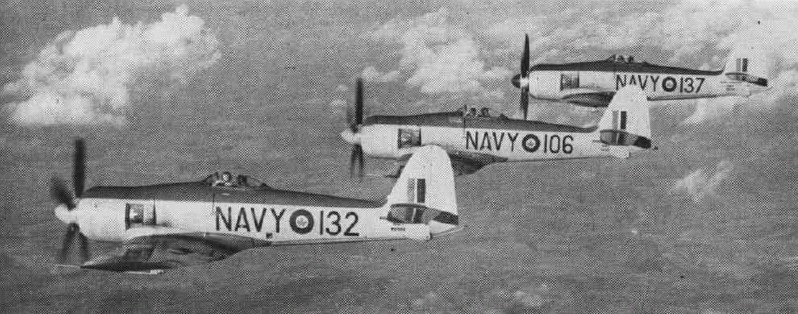
Sea Fury FB.11 fighters of the Royal Canadian Navy

The Sea Fury is capable of operating from the aircraft carriers of the Royal Navy. It was heavily based on preceding Hawker fighter aircraft, particularly the Tempest; features such as the semielliptical wing and fuselage were derived directly from the Tempest, but featured significant refinements, including significant strengthening to withstand the stresses of carrier landings. While the Sea Fury was lighter and smaller than the Tempest, advanced aspects of the Sea Fury's design, such as its Centaurus engine, meant it was also considerably more powerful and faster, making it the final and fastest of Hawker's reciprocating-engine aircraft.

The Sea Fury Mk X was capable of attaining a maximum speed of 460 mph and climb to a height of 20,000 feet in under five minutes. The Sea Fury was reportedly a highly aerobatic aircraft with favourable flying behaviour at all altitudes and speeds, although intentional spinning of the aircraft was banned during the type's military service. During flight displays, the Sea Fury could demonstrate its ability to perform rapid rolls at a rate of 100°/second, attributed to its spring tab-equipped ailerons. For extra thrust on takeoff Jet Assisted Take-Off (JATO) could be used.

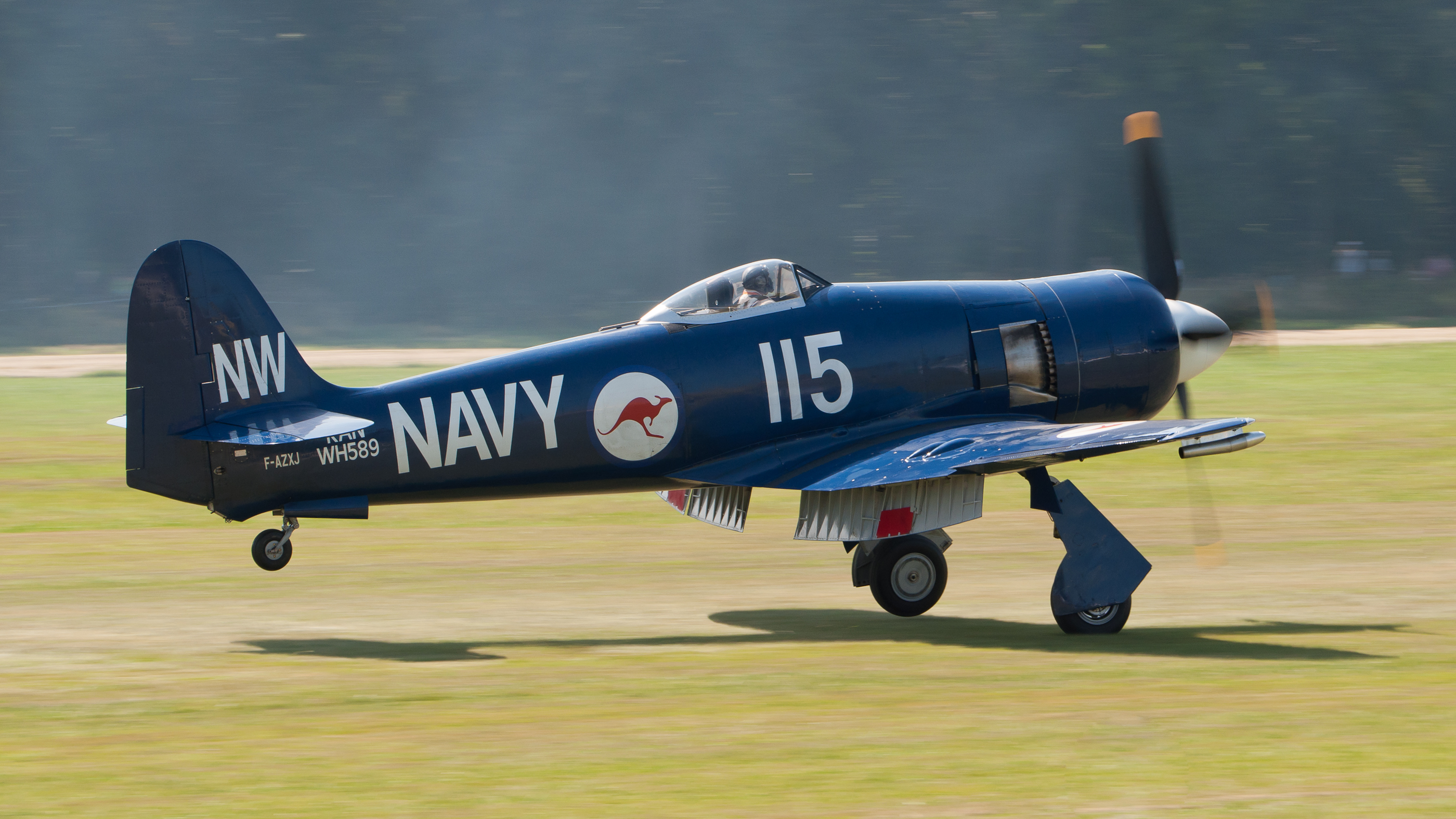
Sea Fury F.10 in the livery of a RAN FB.11 aircraft in 2011

The Sea Fury was powered by the newly developed Bristol Centaurus reciprocating engine, which drove a five-bladed propeller. Many of the engine's subsystems, such as the fully automated cooling system, cockpit gauges, and fuel booster pump, were electrical, powered by an engine-driven generator supplemented by two independent batteries. The hydraulic system, necessary to operate the retractable undercarriage, tail hook, and flaps, was pressurised to 1,800 psi by an engine-driven pump. If this failed, a hand pump in the cockpit could also power these systems. A pneumatic pump was driven by the engine for the brakes. Internal fuel was stored in a total of five self-sealing fuel tanks, two within the fuselage directly in front of the cockpit and three housed within the wings.

Various avionics systems were used on Sea Furies; in this respect, it was unusually well equipped for an aircraft of the era. Many aircraft were equipped with onboard radar, often the ARI 5307 ZBX, which could be directly integrated with a four-channel VHF radio system. Several of the navigational aids, such as the altimeter and G2F compass, were also advanced; many of these subsystems were used on subsequent jet aircraft with little or no alteration. Other aspects of the Sea Fury, such as the majority of the flight controls, were conventional. Some controls were electrically powered, such as the weapons controls, onboard cameras, and the gyroscopic gunsight.

Although the Sea Fury had been originally developed as a pure air-superiority fighter, the Royal Navy viewed the solid construction and payload capabilities of the airframe as positive attributes for ground attack, as well; accordingly, Hawker tested and cleared the type to use a wide range of armaments and support equipment. Each aircraft had four wing-mounted 20 mm Hispano V cannons, and could carry up to 16 rockets, or a combination of 500 lb or 1000 lb bombs. Other loads included 1000 lb incendiary bombs, mines, type 2 smoke floats, or 90-gallon fuel tanks. For photo reconnaissance missions the Sea Fury could be fitted with both vertical and oblique cameras, with a dedicated control box in the cockpit. Other ancillary equipment included chaff to evade hostile attack using radar and flares.

== Operational history ==
=== United Kingdom ===
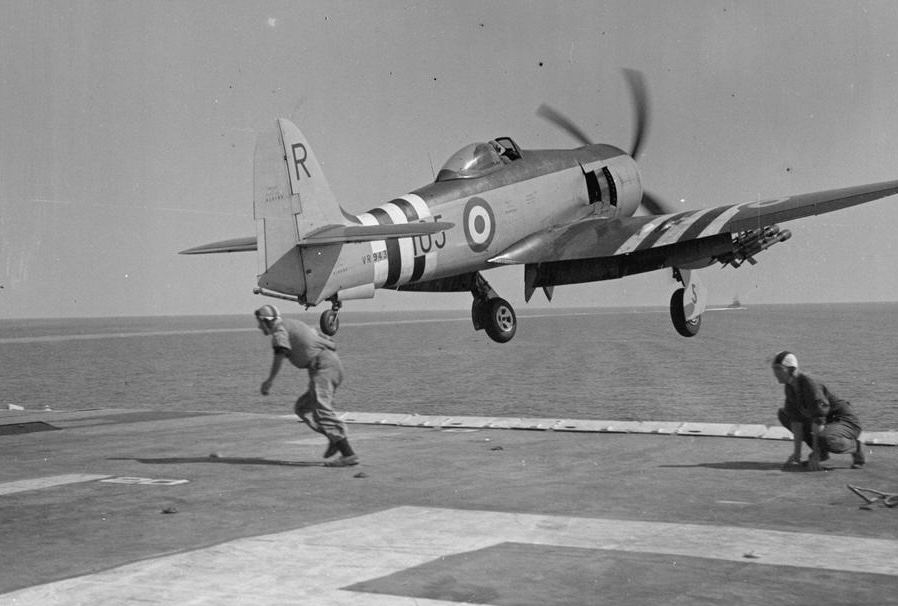
A Sea Fury FB.11 launches from HMS Glory in 1951

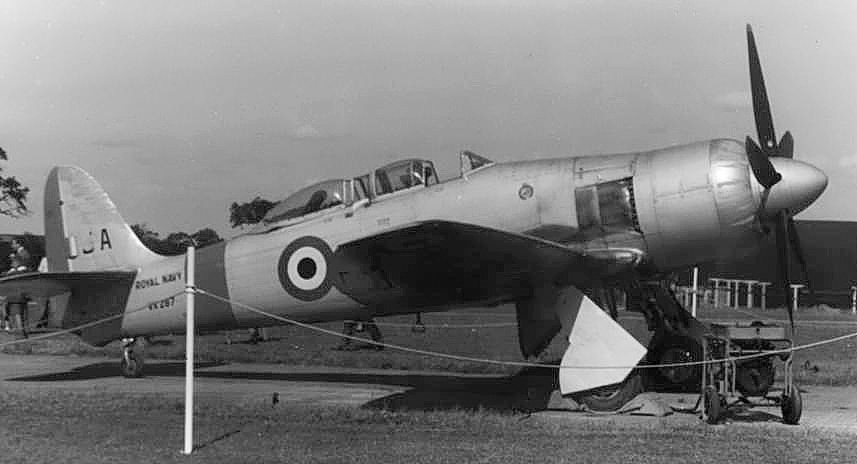
Sea Fury T.20 two-seat trainer of No. 1831 Squadron RNVR at RNAS Stretton, Cheshire, in 1951

778 Naval Air Squadron was the first unit of the Fleet Air Arm to receive the Sea Fury, with deliveries commencing in February 1947 to the squadron's Intensive Flying Development Unit, while 787 Squadron, the Naval Air Fighting Development Squadron, received the Sea Fury in May that year. The first operational unit to be equipped with the Sea Fury was 803 Naval Air Squadron of the Royal Canadian Navy, which replaced Seafires with Sea Furies in August 1947, with 807 Naval Air Squadron was the first operational Royal Navy Sea Fury squadron when it received the aircraft in September that year. The Seafire was ill-suited to carrier use, as the pilot's poor view of the deck and the aircraft's narrow undercarriage made both landings and takeoffs difficult. Consequently, the Sea Fury F Mk X replaced the Seafire on most carriers. For some years, the Sea Fury and Seafire operated alongside each other, with the shorter-range Seafire operating as a fleet defence fighter, while the Sea Fury was employed as a longer-range fighter-bomber.

Sea Furies were issued to Nos. 736, 738, 759, and 778 Squadrons of the Fleet Air Arm. The F Mk X was followed by the Sea Fury FB.11 fighter-bomber variant, which eventually reached a production total of 650 aircraft. The Sea Fury remained the Fleet Air Arm's primary fighter-bomber until 1953, wen jet-powered aircraft, such as the Hawker Sea Hawk and Supermarine Attacker, were introduced to operational service.

The Sea Fury FB.11 entered service with the fighter squadrons of the Royal Naval Volunteer Reserve (RNVR) in August 1951. The RNVR units also operated the Sea Fury T.20 two-seat trainer version from late 1950 to give reserve pilots experience on the type before relinquishing their Supermarine Seafire aircraft. RNVR units that were equipped with the Sea Fury were Nos. 1831, 1832, 1833, 1834, 1835, and 1836 Squadrons. No. 1832, based at RAF Benson, was the last RNVR squadron to relinquish the type in August 1955 for the jet-powered Supermarine Attacker.

==== Korean War ====
Following the outbreak of the Korean War on 25 June 1950, Sea Furies were dispatched to the region as a part of the British Commonwealth Forces Korea, Britain's contribution to the United Nations multinational task force to assist South Korea following an invasion by North Korea. Sea Furies were flown throughout the conflict, primarily as ground-attack aircraft, from the Royal Navy light fleet carriers HMS Glory, HMS Theseus, HMS Ocean, and the Australian carrier HMAS Sydney. After a Fleet Air Arm Seafire was shot down by a United States Air Force Boeing B-29 Superfortress on 28 July 1950, all Commonwealth aircraft were painted with black and white invasion stripes.

The first Sea Furies arrived with 807 Naval Air Squadron embarked on Theseus, which relieved HMS Triumph in October 1950. Operations on Theseus were intense, and the Sea Furies of 807 Squadron flew a total of 264 combat sorties in October. During a brief rest period at the Japanese port of Iwakuni, the catapult was found to be excessively worn, necessitating the launch of Sea Furies with RATOG assistance until it was repaired. In December 1950, Sea Furies conducted several strikes on bridges, airfields, and railways to disrupt North Korean logistics, flying a further 332 sorties without incurring any losses. At this early point in the war, little aerial resistance was encountered and the biggest threats were ground-based antiaircraft fire or technical problems.

In addition to their ground-attack role, Sea Furies also performed air patrols. In this role, a total of 3,900 interceptions was carried out, although none of the intercepted aircraft turned out to be hostile. During the winter period, the Sea Furies were often called upon as spotter aircraft for UN artillery around Inchon, Wonsan, and Songiin. In April 1951, 804 Naval Air Squadron operating off Glory, replaced 807 Squadron, which in turn was replaced by Sydney in September 1951 with 805 and 808 Squadron RAN. The Australian carrier air group flew 2,366 combat sorties. In January 1952, Glory with 804 NAS returned to relieve Sydney following a refit in Australia. For the rest of the war, Glory and Ocean relieved each other on duty.

In 1952, the first Chinese MiG-15 jet fighters appeared. On 8 August 1952, Lieutenant Peter "Hoagy" Carmichael, of 802 Squadron, flying Sea Fury WJ232 from HMS Ocean, was credited with shooting down a MiG-15, marking him as one of only a few pilots of a propeller-driven aircraft to shoot down a jet during the Korean War. (Note: The last time this occurred was on 20 June 1965, when the pilot of a prop-driven Douglas A-1 Skyraider shot down a MiG-17, in Vietnam.) The engagement occurred when Sea Furies and Fireflies were bounced by eight MiG-15s, during which one Firefly was badly damaged, while the Sea Furies escaped unharmed. Some sources claim that this is the only successful engagement by a British pilot in a British aircraft during the Korean War, although a few sources claim a second MiG was downed or damaged in the same action. The Royal Navy credited the kill to Lieutenant Peter "Hoagy" Carmichael although Carmichael always credited it to the whole flight. One of the other pilots in the flight, Sub Lieutenant Brian 'Smoo' Ellis, has since claimed the kill for himself. He claims that he observed hitting the MiG-15 when it overshot his aircraft with its air brakes deployed. On the return journey to HMS Ocean, he states that Carmichael fired his guns at a sandbank on the coast, which the squadron often used for practice or testing their cannons. On landing back at the carrier, he was surprised to find that the kill was awarded to Carmichael. After checking with the armaments officer, Ellis was found to have used the entirety of his ammunition during the engagement, while Carmichael still had 90% of his ammunition left. Because Carmichael fired at the sandbank on their return journey, this brings serious doubts over the claim that he shot down the MiG-15.

=== Australia ===
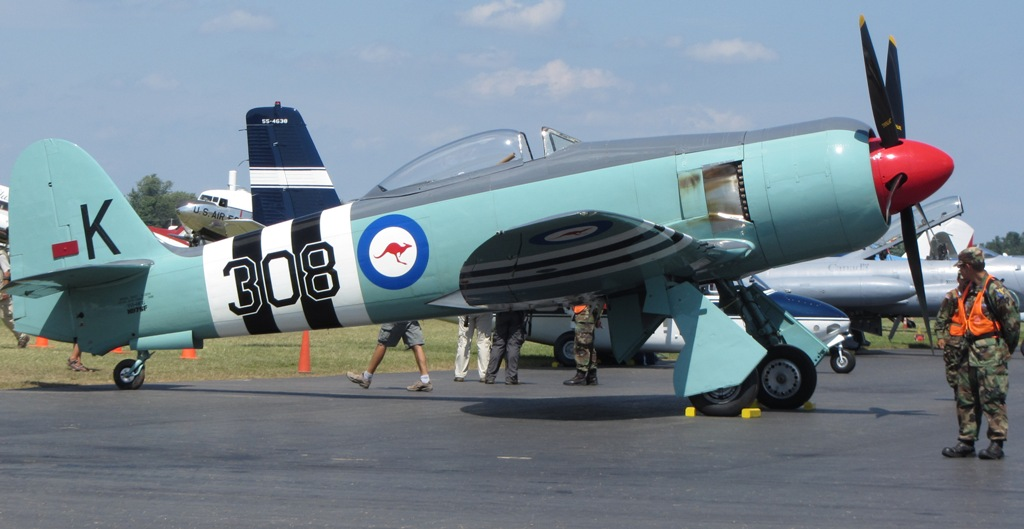
An ex-Iraqi Air Force Fury I, repainted in Australian Fleet Air Arm livery

Australia was one of three Commonwealth nations to operate the Sea Fury, with the others being Canada and Pakistan. The type was operated by two frontline squadrons of the Royal Australian Navy, 805 Squadron and 808 Squadron; a third squadron that flew the Sea Fury, 850 Squadron, was also briefly active. Two Australian aircraft carriers, HMAS Sydney and HMAS Vengeance, employed Sea Furies in their air wings. The Sea Fury was used by Australia during the Korean War, flying from carriers based along the Korean coast in support of friendly ground forces. The Sea Fury was operated by Australian forces between 1948 and 1962.

=== Burma ===
Between 1957 and 1958, Burma received 21 Sea Furies, the majority of them being ex-FAA aircraft. The Sea Fury was frequently employed as a counterinsurgency platform in Burmese service and on 15 February 1961, a Republic of China Air Force Consolidated PB4Y Privateer was intercepted and shot down by a Sea Fury near the Thai-Burmese border. Of the aircraft's crew, five were killed and two were captured. The aircraft had been on a supply run to Chinese Kuomintang forces fighting in northern Burma. The Burmese Sea Furies are thought to have been retired in 1968 and replaced by armed Lockheed T-33 Shooting Stars.

=== Canada ===
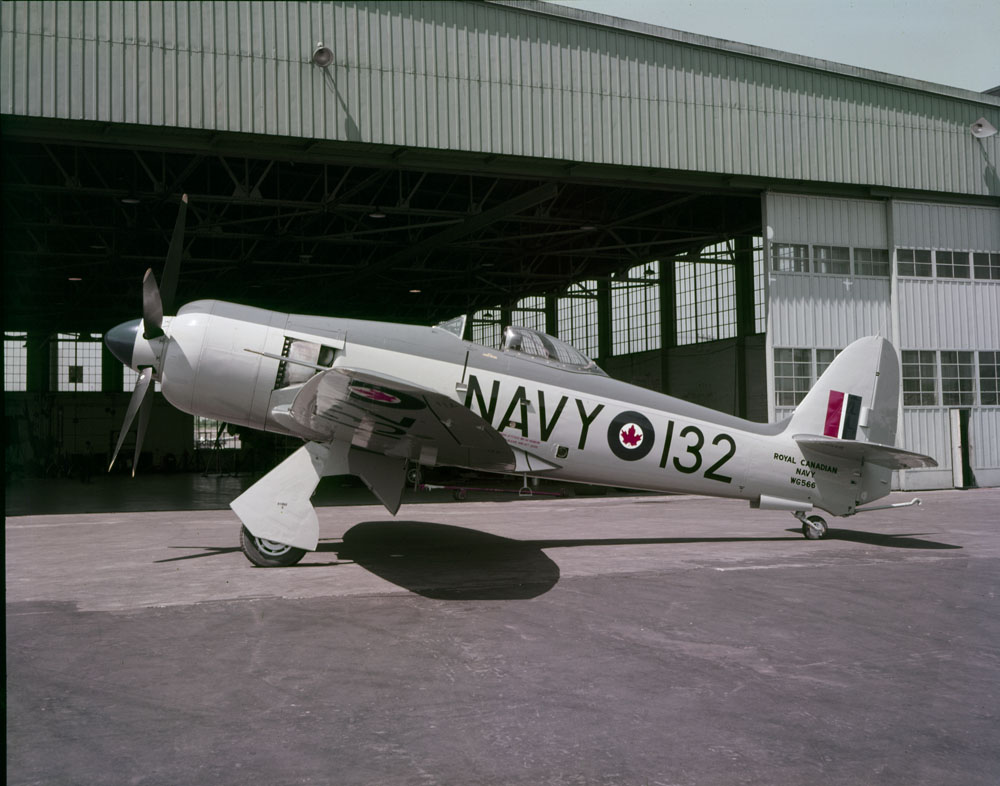
Canadian Sea Fury FB.11 serial number WG566

The Royal Canadian Navy (RCN) became a significant customer of the Sea Fury, and many of its aircraft were diverted from existing Royal Navy contracts. On 23 June 1948, the first aircraft was accepted at RCAF Rockcliffe. The type was quickly put to use replacing Canada's existing inventory of Seafires, taking on the primary role of fleet air defence operating from the aircraft carrier HMCS Magnificent. Two Canadian squadrons operated the Sea Fury, Nos. 803 and 883 Squadrons, which were later renumbered as 870 and 871. Pilot training on the Sea Fury was normally conducted at the RCN's HMCS Shearwater land base. Landing difficulties with the Sea Fury were experienced following the RCN's decision to convert to the U.S. Navy's deck landing procedures, which were prone to overstressing and damaging the airframes, as the Sea Fury had been designed for a tail-down landing attitude. The Sea Fury was operated between 1948 and 1956 by the RCN, whereupon they were replaced by the jet-powered McDonnell F2H Banshee. The retired aircraft were put into storage, and some were subsequently purchased by civilians.

=== Cuba ===
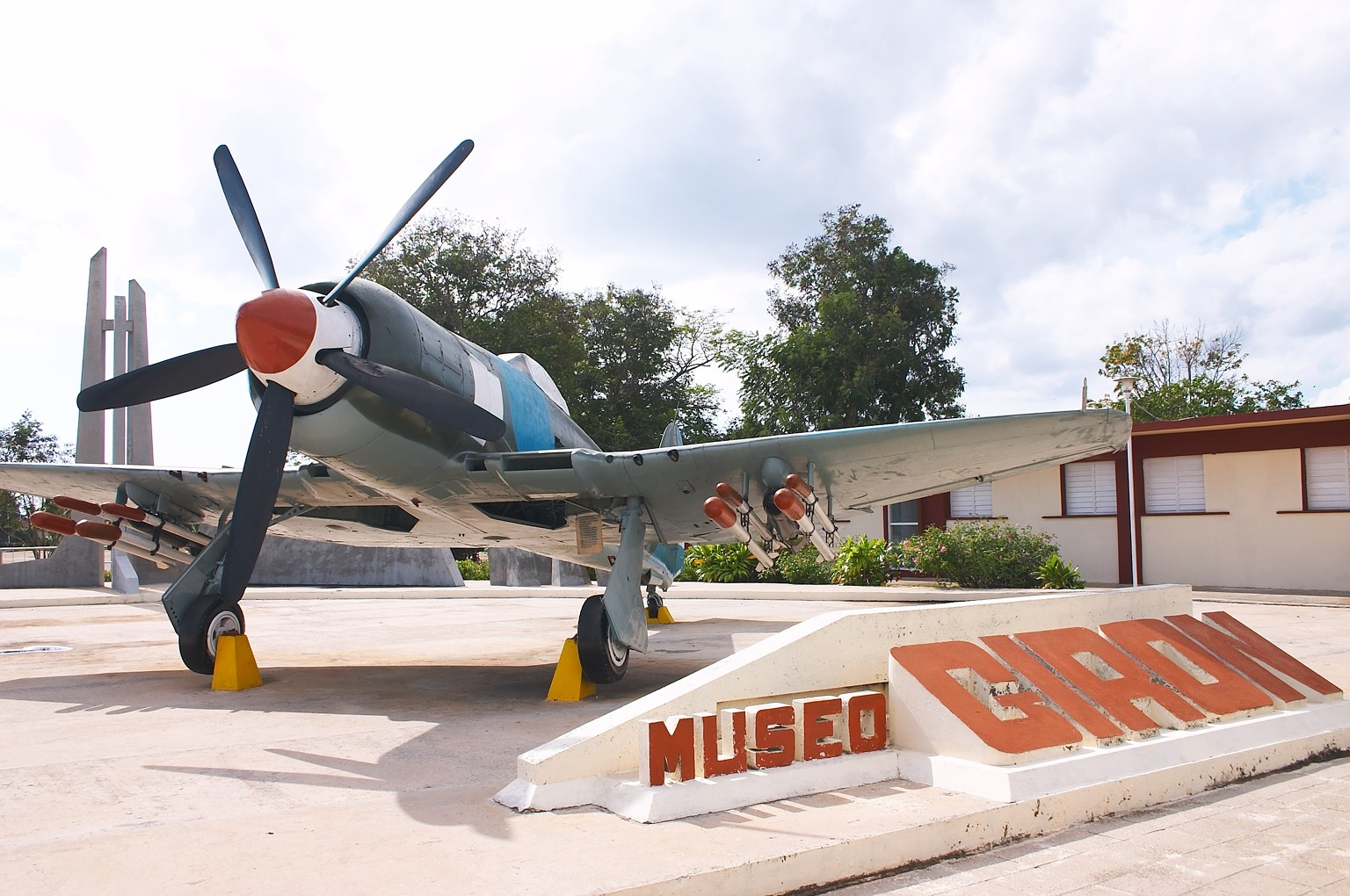
Cuban Sea Fury FB.11, serial number 541, (FAR), preserved at the Museo Giron, Cuba in 2006

In 1958 during the Cuban Revolution, the Fuerza Aérea del Ejercito de Cuba (FAEC) purchased a total of 17 refurbished (ex-Fleet Air Arm) Sea Furies from Hawker, comprising 15 FB.11s and two T.20 trainers. The aircraft were briefly flown by FAEC prior to the ousting of President Fulgencio Batista and the assumption of power by Fidel Castro. Following the change in government, the Sea Furies were retained by the Fuerza Aérea Revolucionaria ("Revolutionary Air Force", FAR); these aircraft proved difficult to keep operational, partly because the new military lacked personnel experienced with the type.

In April 1961, during the Bay of Pigs Invasion, air support for the Cuban exiles' Brigade 2506 was provided by ex-USAF, CIA-operated Douglas B-26B Invaders; United States President John F. Kennedy had decided against involving U.S. Navy aircraft. The only FAR fighter aircraft to see combat were three Sea Furies and five Lockheed T-33 armed jet trainers belonging to the Escuadrón Persecución y Combate ("Pursuit and Combat Squadron"), based at the San Antonio de los Baños and Antonio Maceo air bases.

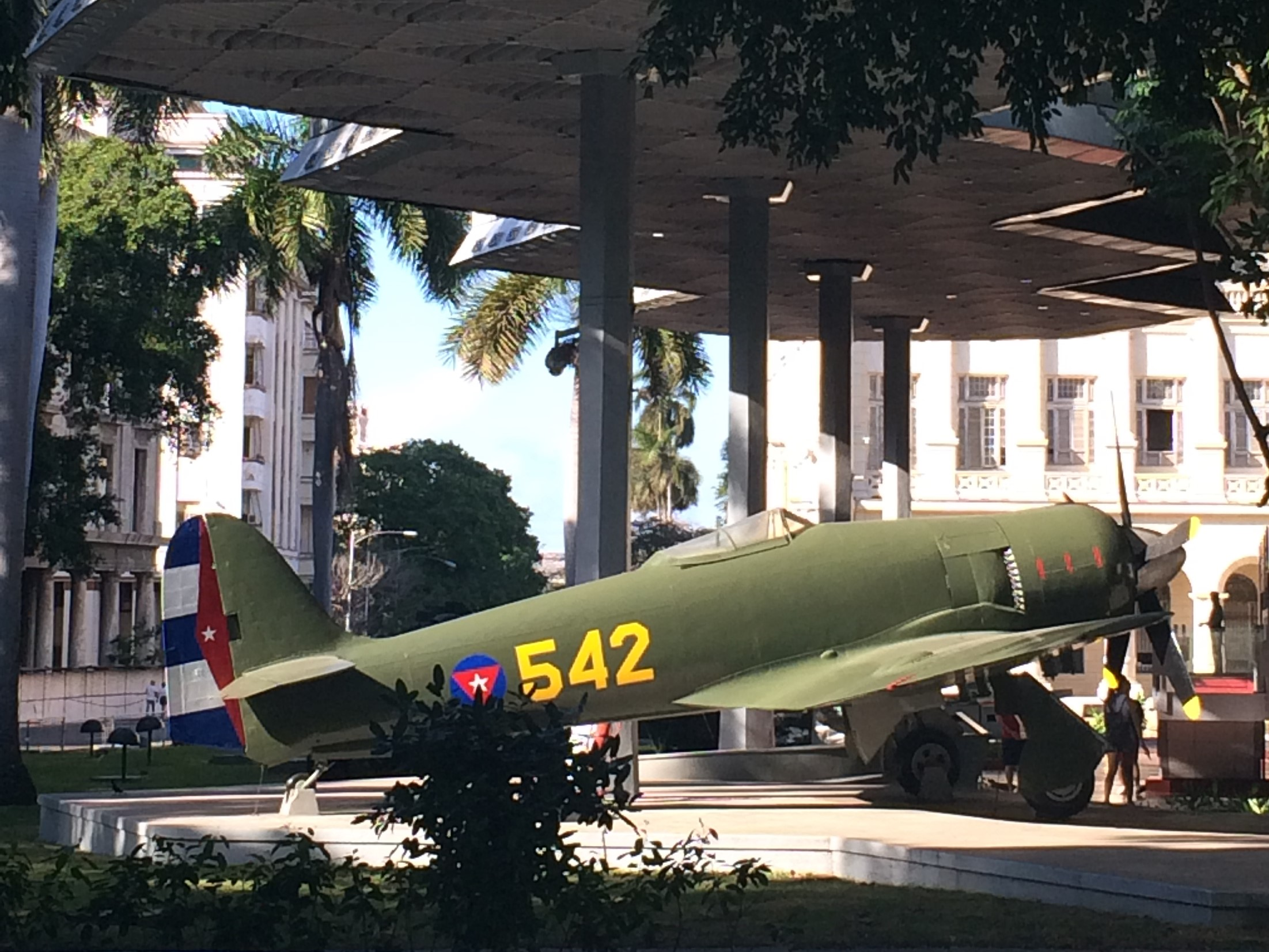
Cuban Sea Fury FB.11 at the Museum of the Revolution in Havana

In pre-emptive attacks on 15 April, two Sea Furies were destroyed on the ground, one at Ciudad Libertad and one in a hangar near Moa. During the ensuing aerial combat, a single airborne Sea Fury was lost during the invasion.

In the early hours of 17 April, Brigade 2506 began to land at Playa Girón. Around 06:30, a FAR formation composed of three Sea Furies, one B-26, and two T-33s started attacking the exiles' ships. At about 06:50, 8.0 kilometres (5.0 mi) south of Playa Larga, the transport ship Houston was damaged by rockets and cannons from FAR aircraft, including Sea Furies piloted by Major Enrique Carreras Rojas and Captain Gustavo Bourzac; Houston caught fire and was abandoned. While attempting to land at an airbase, Carreras Rojas's Sea Fury was attacked and damaged by a CIA B-26; he was able to abort his approach and escape. Carreras Rojas later shot down another B-26. While attempting to shoot down a Curtiss C-46 transport aircraft, Nicaraguan-born pilot Carlos Ulloa crashed in the Bay of Pigs around 08:30, either due to an engine stall or being hit by antiaircraft fire. Around 09:30, multiple FAR aircraft destroyed an ammunition ship, Rio Escondido. A Sea Fury piloted by Lieutenant Douglas Rudd also destroyed a B-26.

=== Iraq ===
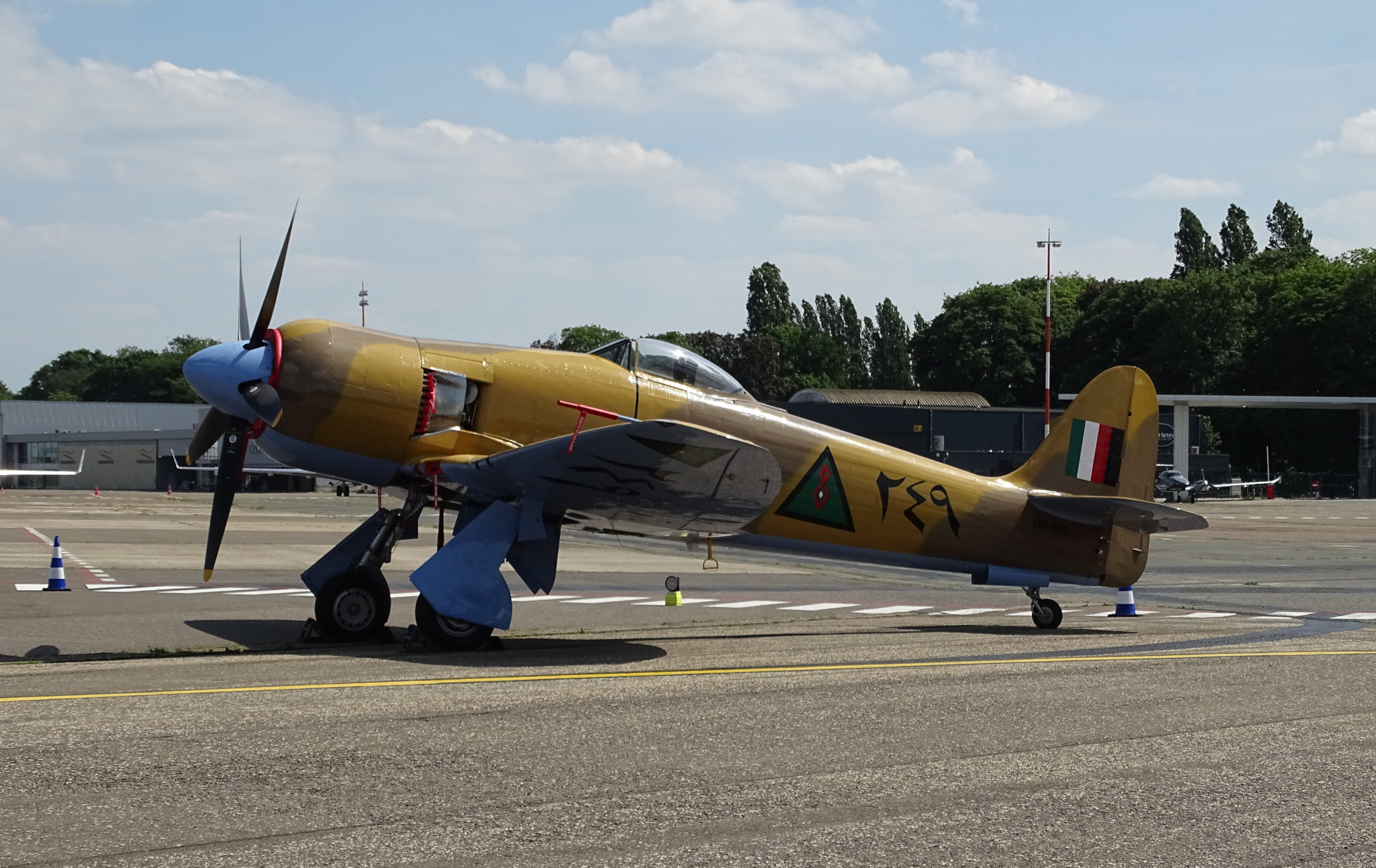
A warbird Sea Fury painted in Iraqi colours

Iraq bought its first 30 Fury F.1 fighters and two Fury T.52 trainers in 1946. These aircraft were operated by Nos. 1 and 7 Squadrons. Iraqi Furies did not take part in the first weeks of the 1948 Arab-Israeli War. However, after newly received Israeli Boeing B-17s started bombing Arab cities, the governments of Syria and Transjordan demanded that the Iraqis deploy their Furies. Hence, six aircraft from No.7 Squadron were transferred to Damascus in late July 1948; one of them crashed on landing on its arrival. Another one followed in September, with its pilot being injured. The Iraqi Furies did not see much action during that war, because of the limited amount of ammunition supplied by the British. Only armed reconnaissance missions were flown, and no air combats with Israeli aircraft were reported.

An additional 20 Fury F.1s were acquired in 1951, which enabled No. 4 Squadron to start operating the type. Iraqi Furies saw action during the numerous Kurdish uprisings in the north of the country throughout the 1960s. They notably performed close air support missions, as well as attacks on villages, rebel-controlled roadblocks, and troop concentrations. They were ultimately replaced by Sukhoi Su-7s between 1967 and 1969.

=== Netherlands ===
The Netherlands was the first export customer for the Sea Fury, and the Netherlands Royal Navy operated the aircraft from two of its aircraft carriers, both of which were named HNLMS Karel Doorman, as they were operated at separate periods from one another. Royal Netherlands Navy vessels commonly operated alongside Royal Navy ships, thus Dutch Sea Furies also regularly operated from FAA land bases and RN carriers. During 1947, Dutch Sea Furies operating from HNLMS Karel Doorman were employed in a ground-support capacity against insurgent fighters in the Dutch East Indies. The Dutch procured and licence-built additional Sea Furies for carrier operations, although the type ultimately was replaced by the jet-powered Hawker Sea Hawk from the late 1950s onwards.

=== Pakistan ===
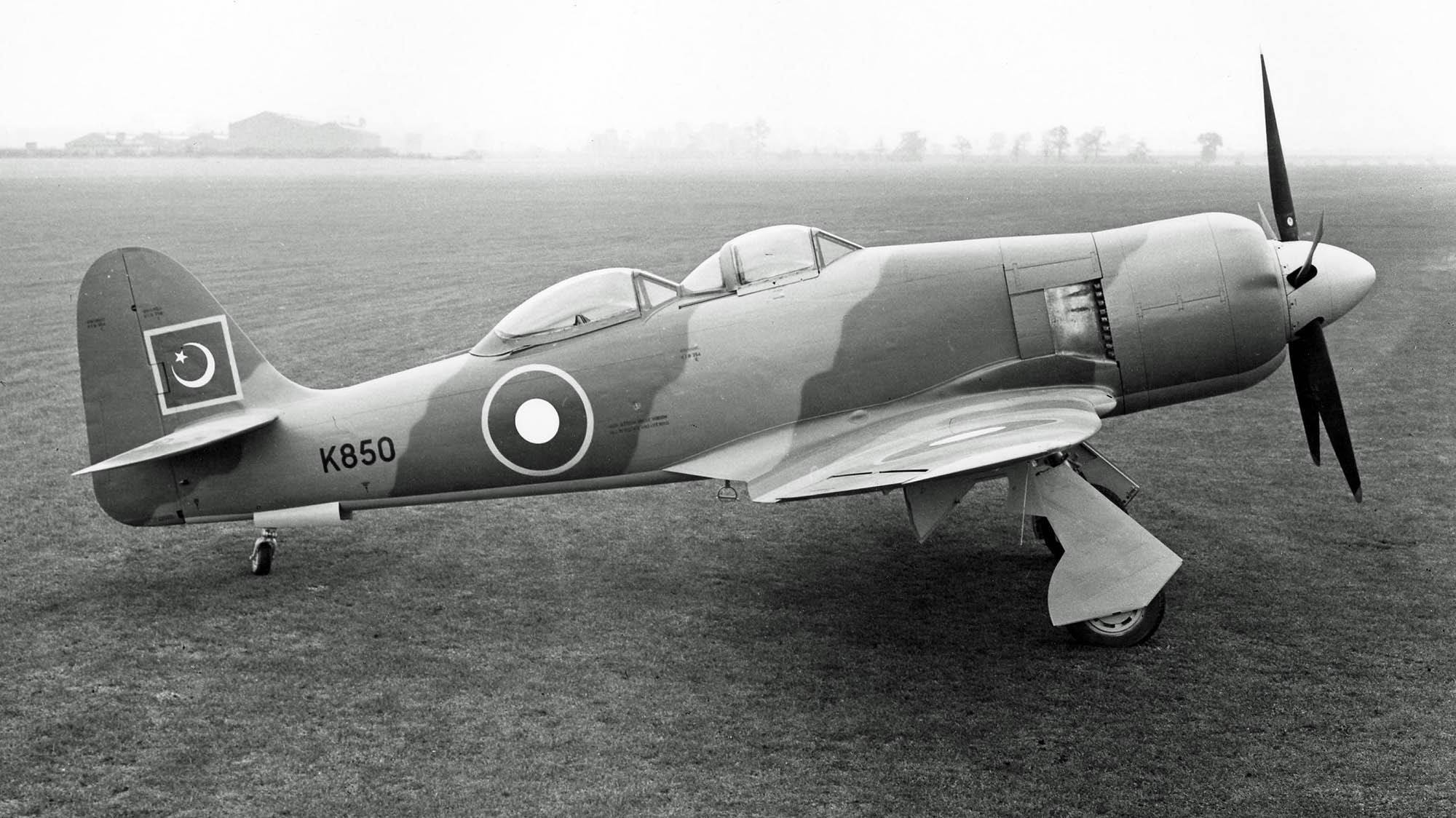
A Sea Fury T.61 training aircraft of the Pakistan Air Force at Risalpur Air Base in 1948

One of the largest export customers for the type was Pakistan. In 1949, an initial order for 50 Sea Fury FB.60 aircraft for the Pakistan Air Force was placed. A total of 87 new-build Sea Furies was purchased and delivered between 1950 and 1952; some ex-FAA and Iraqi Sea Furies were also subsequently purchased. The aircraft was operated by three frontline squadrons, No. 5, No.9, and No.14. The Sea Fury began to be replaced by the jet-powered North American F-86 Sabre in 1955, and the last Sea Furies in Pakistani service ultimately were retired in 1960.

== Variants ==
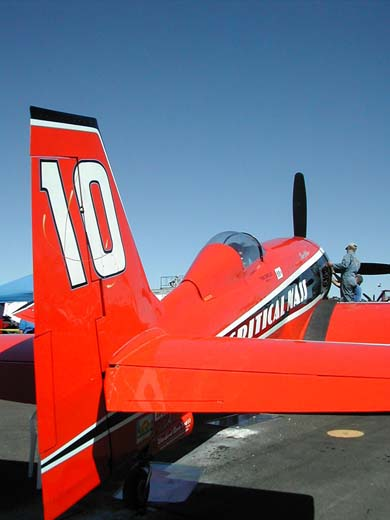
Critical Mass, a modified Sea Fury T.20S air racer

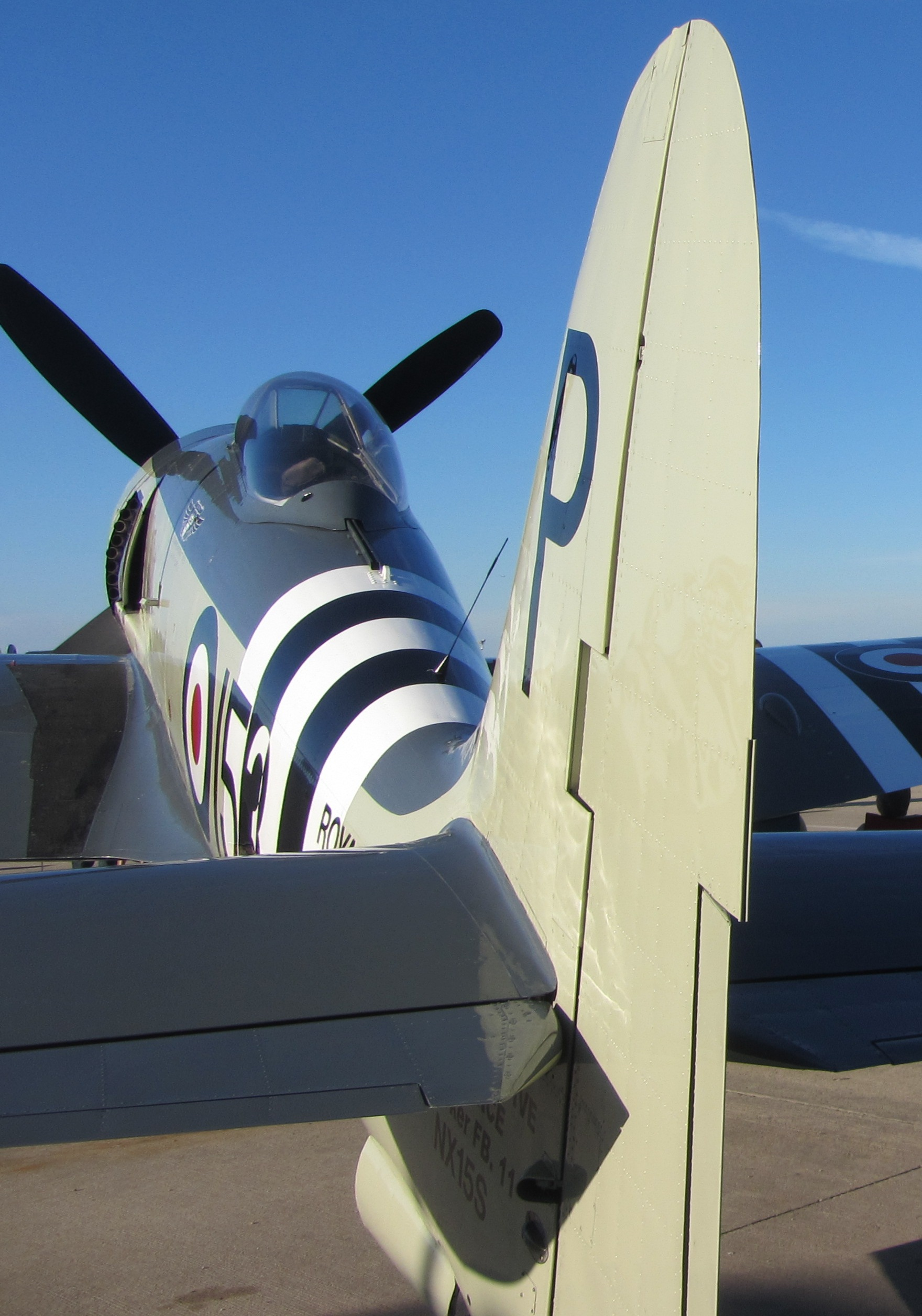
Sea Fury FB.11

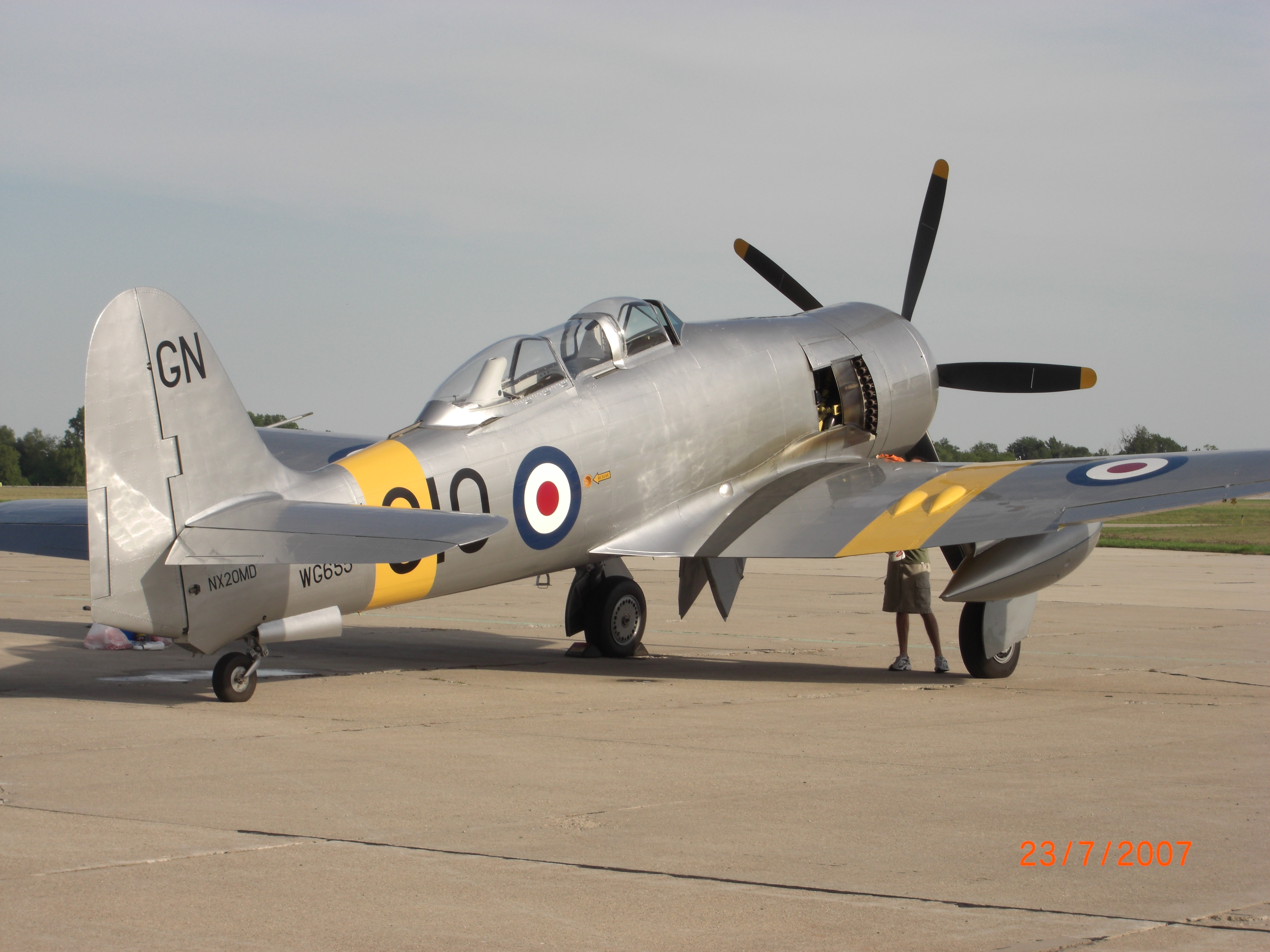
Sea Fury T.20 at Oshkosh Air Show in 2007

Fury
RAF order for 200 aircraft placed on 28 April 1944; order cancelled.
Sea Fury F.10
Single-seat fighter version for the Royal Navy, 50 built by Hawker, an order for a further 300 placed at the same time to be built by Boulton Paul was cancelled. First production aircraft flew on 15 August 1946.
Sea Fury FB.11
Single-seat fighter-bomber for the Royal Navy, Royal Australian Navy, Royal Canadian Navy and Royal Netherlands Navy, 615 built, including 31 for the RAN and 53 for the RCN.
Sea Fury T.20
Two-seat training version for the Royal Navy, 61 built. Ten of these were later converted to target tugs (designated T.20S) for West Germany, operated by the civilian company Deutscher Luftfahrt-Beratungsdienst (DLB).
Sea Fury F.50
Single-seat fighter version for the Royal Netherlands Navy, 10 built.
Sea Fury FB.51
Single-seat fighter-bomber version for the Royal Netherlands Navy, 25 built.
Fury FB.60
Single-seat fighter-bomber version for the Pakistan Air Force and the Royal Netherlands Navy, 93 built for Pakistan and 12 for the Netherlands.
Fury T.61
Two-seat training version for the Pakistan Air Force, five built.
Fury I
Single-seat land-based fighter version for the Iraqi Air Force. Unofficially known as the "Baghdad Furies", 55 built.
Fury Trainer
Two-seat training version for the Iraqi Air Force, five built.

== Operators ==
- Australia
- Burma
- Canada
- Cuba
- Egypt
- West Germany
- Iraq
- Netherlands
- Pakistan
- United Kingdom

== Surviving aircraft ==
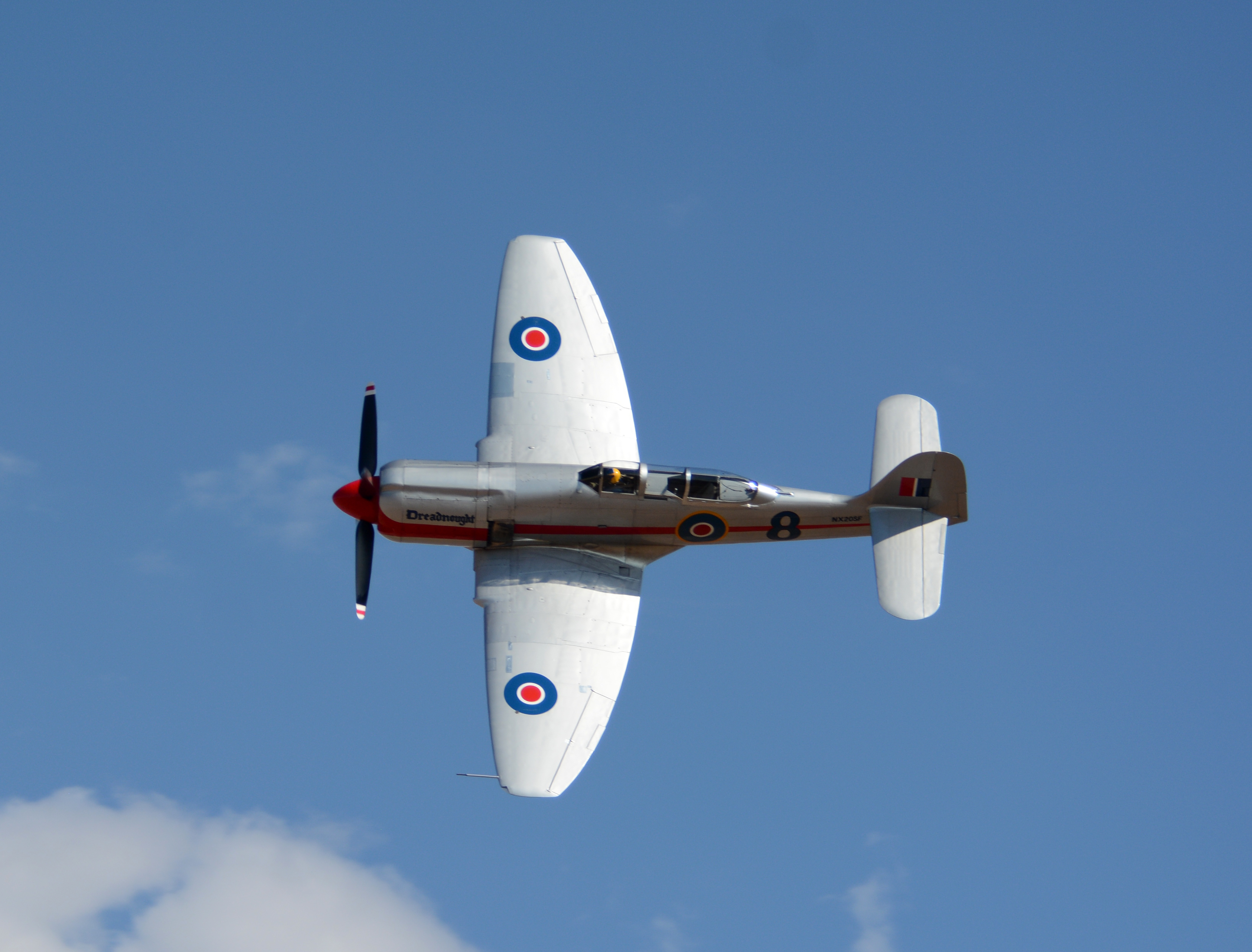
Modified Sea Fury T.20 Dreadnought (N20SF) at 2014 Reno Air Races

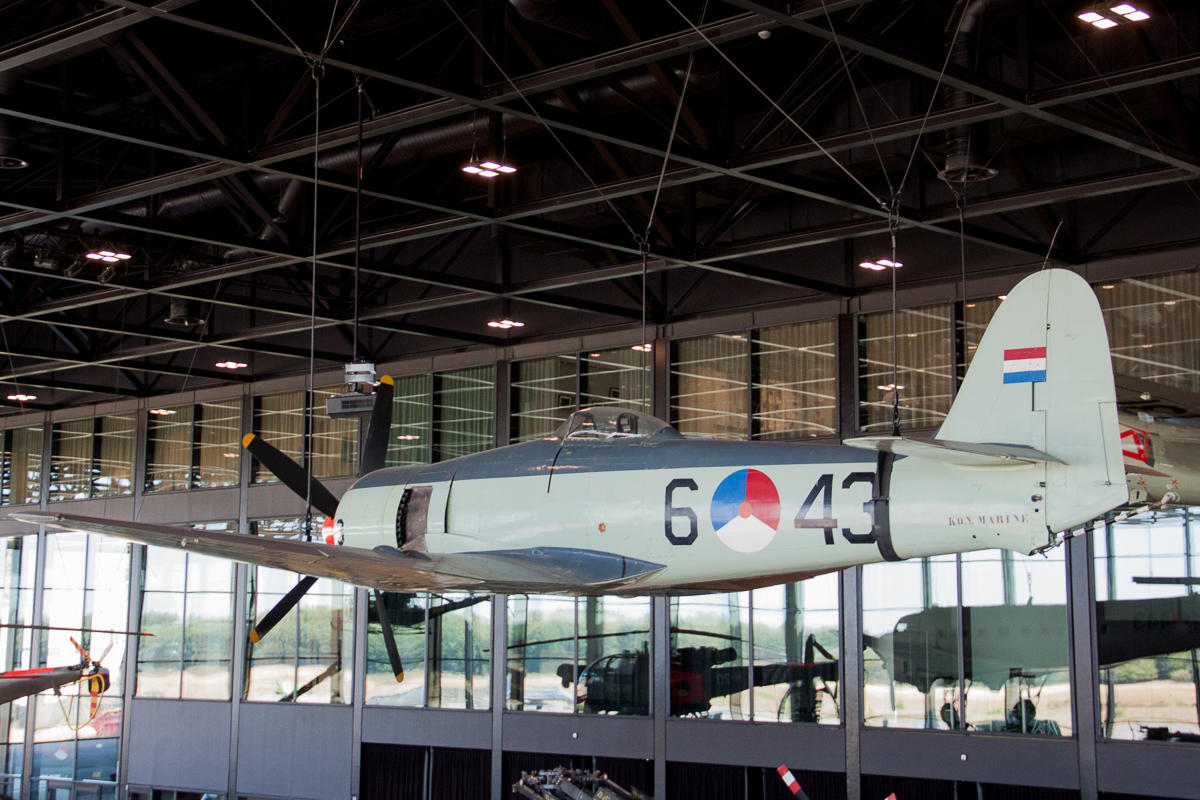
Former Royal Netherlands Navy Sea Fury FB.11 at the National Military Museum in Soesterberg

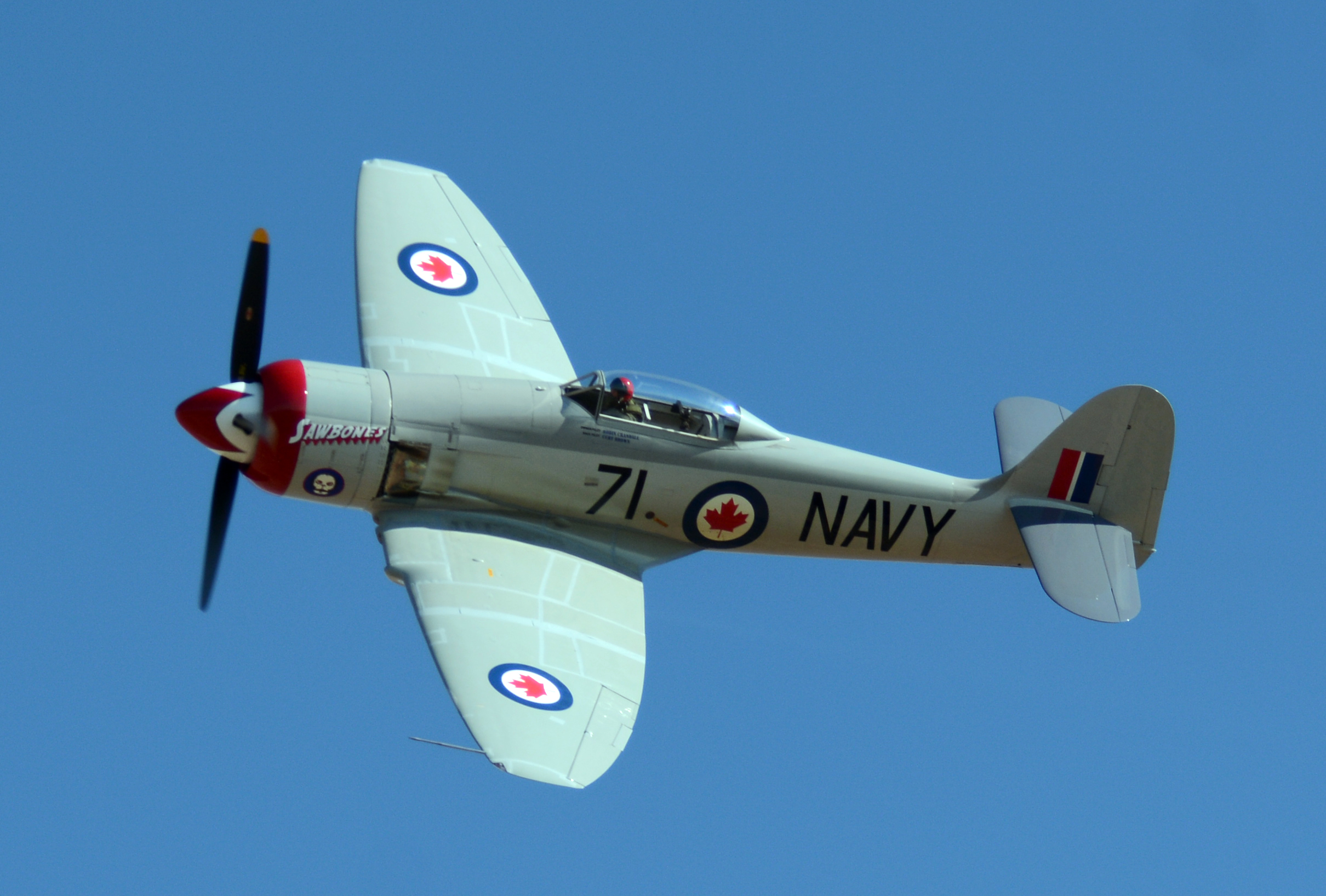
Modified Fury I Sawbones (N71GB) at 2014 Reno Air Races

As production continued well after the end of the Second World War and aircraft remained in Royal Navy service until 1955, dozens of airframes have survived in varying conditions. Sea Furies were overhauled by Hawker Aircraft at its factory at Blackpool during 1959 and supplied to civil companies in Germany, equipped with target-towing gear for Luftwaffe contract flying. Some of these aircraft survive.

In the late 1970s David Tallichet and Ed Jurist secured the purchase of 24 Furies from Iraq, including spare parts. These were transported to the US for restoration, and are now owned and operated internationally by collectors.

Around a dozen heavily modified Sea Furies are raced regularly at the Reno Air Races as of 2009. Most of these examples were modified to replace the original sleeve valve Centaurus radial with the Pratt & Whitney R-4360 Wasp Major or the Wright R-3350 Duplex-Cyclone radial engine. These include Dreadnought and Furias, which have had Wasp Major engines installed.

Ex-Iraqi Fury 326 (C/N 41H/643827) restored in New Zealand in the 1980s was painted as WJ232, the aircraft 'Hoagy' Carmichael flew during the 9 August 1952 action which resulted in him being credited with the destruction of a MiG-15 jet fighter. The aircraft was sold in Australia in its Royal Navy markings, with civil registration VH-SHF. The original WJ232 was sold by the Royal Navy back to Hawker, refurbished and delivered to Burma as UB467 in 1958.

Many additional airframes remain as static displays in museums worldwide. April 1, 1957 saw Lieutenant Commander Derek Prout deliver an RCN Hawker Sea Fury WG-565 to Calgary for use as a ground instruction airframe at the Southern Alberta Institute of Technology. F/O Lynn Garrison flew the aircraft making the last official Canadian military flight of the type. Prout would lose his life in the crash of an F2H-3 Banshee at RCN Shearwater, Nova Scotia May 31, 1957.

RCN Sea Fury WG-565, McCall Field, Calgary, after last Canadian flight of type by Flyine Officer Lynn Garrison 1 April 1957

An airframe is on display outside the Granma Memorial, as part of the Museum of the Revolution in Havana. A second airframe forms an outside part of the Museo Giron in Playa Girón.

During the 1989 Prestwick (Glasgow) Air Show, a Sea Fury had to be ditched in the sea as the port landing gear was stuck. The pilot parachuted to safety.

On 31 July 2014 a Hawker Sea Fury T.20 (VX281) owned by Royal Navy Historic Flight made a controlled crash landing at the RNAS Culdrose Air Day. During the display, smoke was seen coming from the plane's engine. During an approach for an emergency landing, the undercarriage extended but failed to lock, leading to a belly landing. Lt Cdr Chris Gotke, 44, the pilot, suffered no injuries and was later awarded the Air Force Cross for his decision to continue to fly the aircraft to safety rather than parachute out and abandon it; he later stated that "The safety of the crowd was never a factor because the aircraft was fully controllable." This aircraft returned to the air in September 2017 following repairs. On 28 April 2021 it crashed again near RNAS Yeovilton following an engine problem. After the aircraft's insurer declared it a write-off, the owners announced plans to sell the wrecked plane in hopes that some other party would restore it again.

Since the type's retirement, several Sea Furies have been operated by the Royal Navy Historic Flight; between 1989 and 1990 two of the flight's Sea Furies were lost in separate incidents.

A two-seat Sea Fury was used in the making of the 2022 film Devotion to allow actors to simulate piloting an F8F Bearcat. The Sea Fury's rear seat was modified to resemble a Bearcat cockpit and visible portions of the airframe were painted like a VF-32 Bearcat.

=== Aircraft on display ===
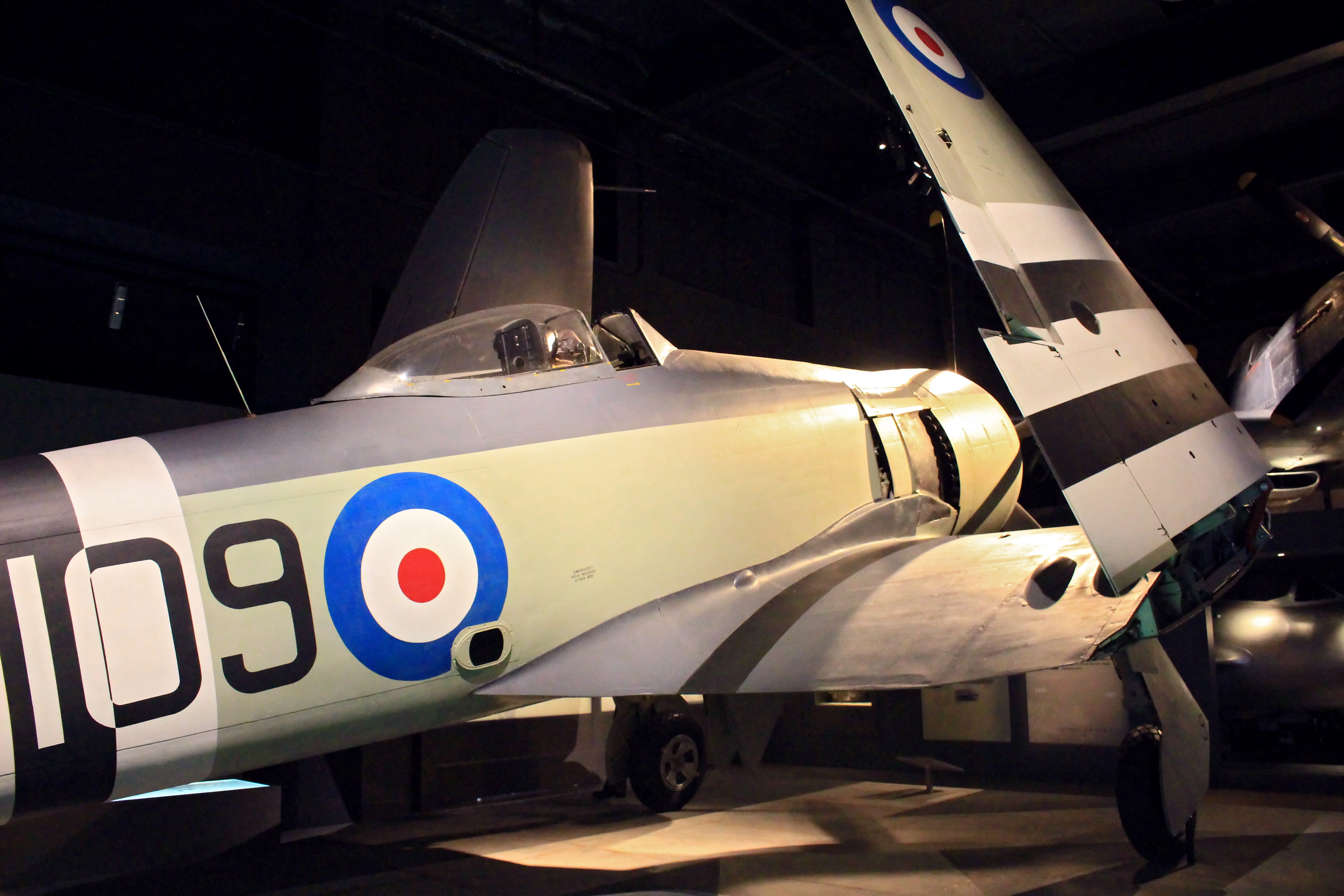
Sea Fury FB.11, serial number VW232, marked as VX730 (RAN), displayed on carrier deck diorama at the Australian War Memorial, Canberra

- Sea Fury FB.11, serial number WJ231 (RN): Fleet Air Arm Museum, United Kingdom
- Sea Fury FB.11, serial number TG119 (RCN): Canadian Aviation and Space Museum, Ottawa, Canada
- Sea Fury FB.11, serial number WG565 (RCN): Naval Museum of Alberta, Calgary, Alberta
- Sea Fury FB.11, serial number VW232 (marked as VX730): Australian War Memorial, Canberra, Australia
- Sea Fury FB.11: Fleet Air Arm Museum, Australia
- Fury Mk 10 Magnificent Obsession (marked as RAN 253 K): War Eagles Air Museum, Santa Teresa, New Mexico, United States
- Sea Fury FB.51 6-43, c/n 6310: Nationaal Militair Museum, Soesterberg, The Netherlands.
- Sea Fury FB.11 542: Museo de la Revolución, Havana, Cuba.
- Sea Fury FB.11 541: Museo Girón, Playa Girón, Cuba.

== Specifications (FB.11) ==
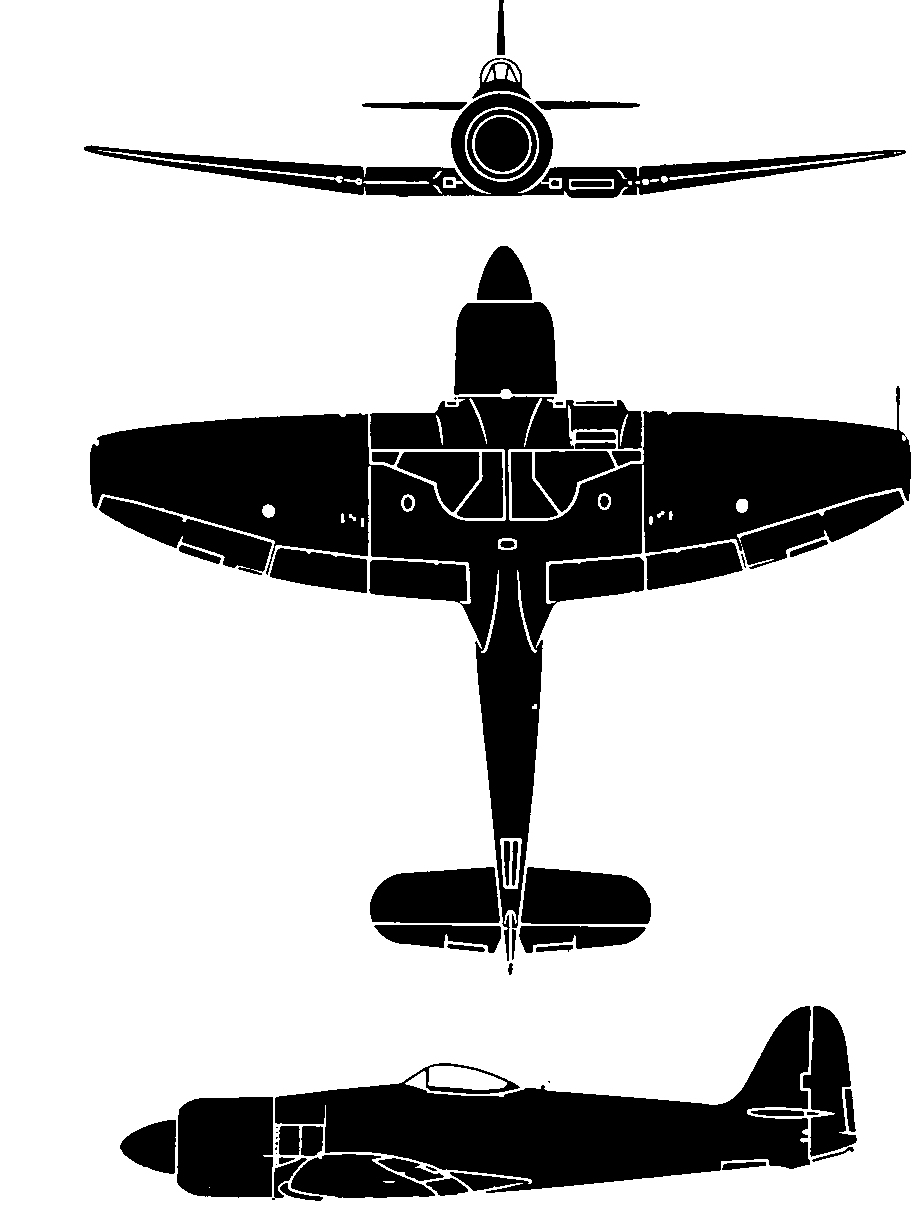
3-view drawing of the Sea Fury FB.11

External videos
- Sea Fury display at RAF Cosford Airshow 2013
- Documentary on the Hawker Sea Fury

Data from Hawker's Tempestuous Finale Flight International

General characteristics

- Crew: 1
- Length: 34 ft 8 in (10.57 m)
- Wingspan: 38 ft 4.75 in (11.7031 m)
- Height: 15 ft 10.5 in (4.839 m)
- Wing area: 280 sq ft (26 m^{2})
- Empty weight: 9,240 lb (4,191 kg)
- Gross weight: 12,350 lb (5,602 kg)
- Max takeoff weight: 14,650 lb (6,645 kg)
- Powerplant: 1 × Bristol Centaurus 18 18-cylinder air-cooled radial piston engine, 2,480 hp (1,850 kW) for take-off
- Propellers: 5-bladed constant-speed propeller

Performance

- Maximum speed: 460 mph (740 km/h, 400 kn) at 18,000 ft (5,500 m)
- Range: 780 mi (1,260 km, 680 nmi)
- Ferry range: 904 mi (1,455 km, 786 nmi) with two drop tanks
- Service ceiling: 35,800 ft (10,900 m)
- Rate of climb: 4,320 ft/min (21.9 m/s)

Armament

- Guns: 4 × 20 mm (0.79 in) Hispano Mk V autocannon, (145 rpg)
- Rockets: Up to 16 × 3 inch rockets
- Bombs: 2,000 lb (910 kg) of bombs

== See also ==
Related development

- Hawker Typhoon
- Hawker Tempest
- Hawker Tornado

Aircraft of comparable role, configuration, and era

- CAC Kangaroo
- Focke-Wulf Fw 190A-9
- Grumman F8F Bearcat
- Lavochkin La-9
- Kawanishi N1K2-J
- Kawasaki Ki-100
- Martin-Baker MB 5
- Mitsubishi A7M
- Nakajima Ki-84
- Republic P-47 Thunderbolt
- Supermarine Seafang
- Vought F4U Corsair

Related lists

- List of aircraft of the Fleet Air Arm
