= HNLMS Karel Doorman =

Four ships of the Royal Netherlands Navy have been named HNLMS Karel Doorman (Hr.Ms. Karel Doorman or Zr.Ms. Karel Doorman in Dutch) after Admiral Karel Doorman:

- The first HNLMS Karel Doorman (QH1), originally the escort carrier HMS Nairana, was the Netherlands' first aircraft carrier.
- The second HNLMS Karel Doorman (R81), a Colossus-class aircraft carrier (originally HMS Venerable), was commissioned into the Netherlands Navy on 28 May 1948. She was sold to Argentina in 1970 and renamed Veinticinco de Mayo
- The third HNLMS Karel Doorman (F827) is the lead ship of her class of frigates.
- The fourth HNLMS Karel Doorman (A833) is a replenishment and logistic ship, which was commissioned in 2015.

== See also ==
- Karel Doorman-class frigate of the Royal Netherlands Navy
- Karel Doorman-class support ship of the Royal Netherlands Navy
