= Butlin's Ayr =

Former holiday camp in South Ayrshire, Scotland

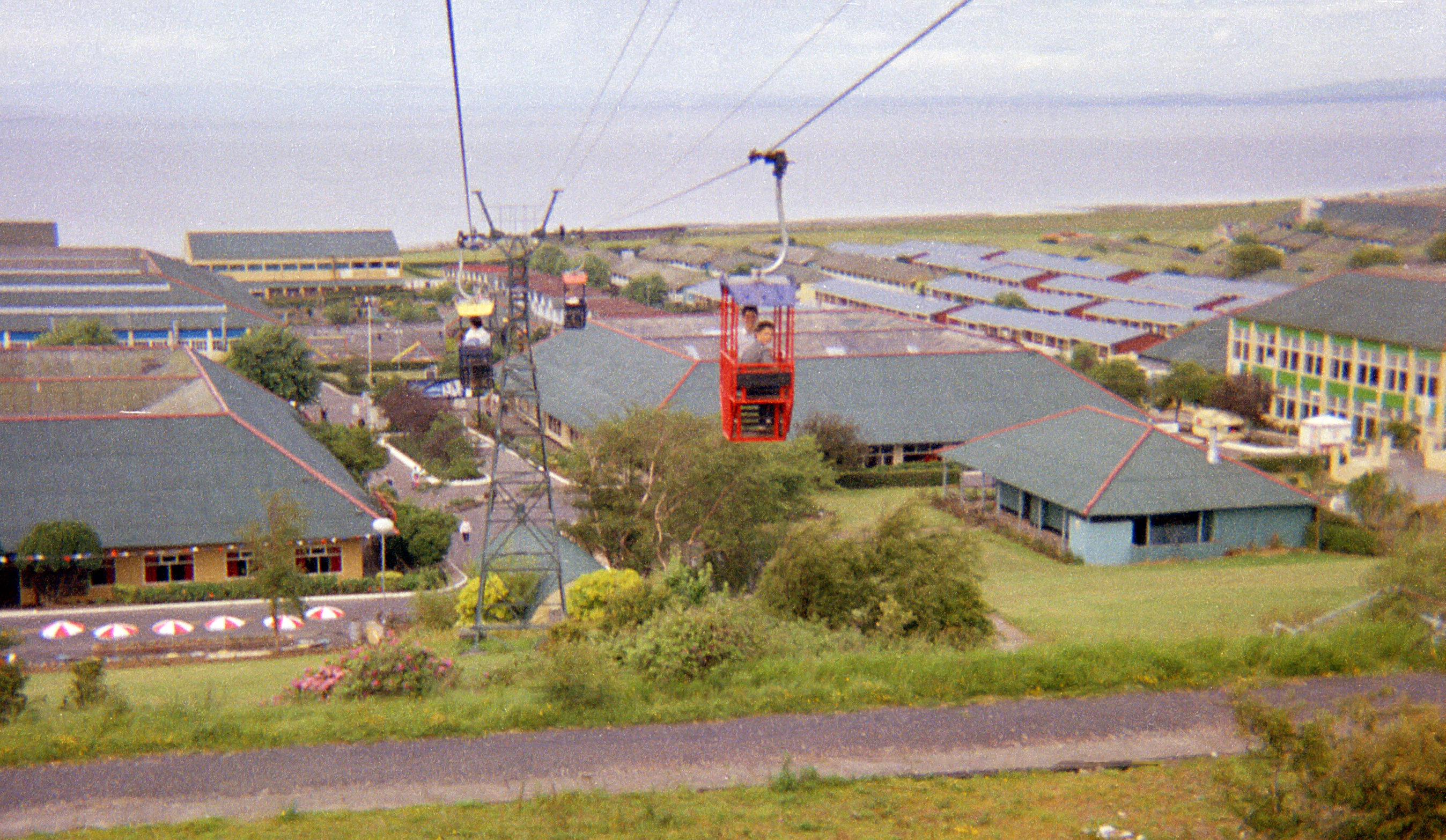
- Overhead view in 1985, prior to refurbishment

- Location within South Ayrshire
- Location: Ayr
- Coordinates: 55.432°N 4.685°W
- Subsequent names: Butlins Ayr (1946–1987); Wonderwest World (1987–1999)
- Operated by: Butlins
- Established: 1946
- Closed: 1998

Butlin's Ayr was a holiday camp located near Ayr in South Ayrshire, Scotland. When originally opened in 1946, it was named Butlin's Ayr, but in 1987 was renamed Wonderwest World. It closed in 1998 and re-opened in 1999 under the management of Haven Holidays who renamed it Craig Tara.

== Butlins ==
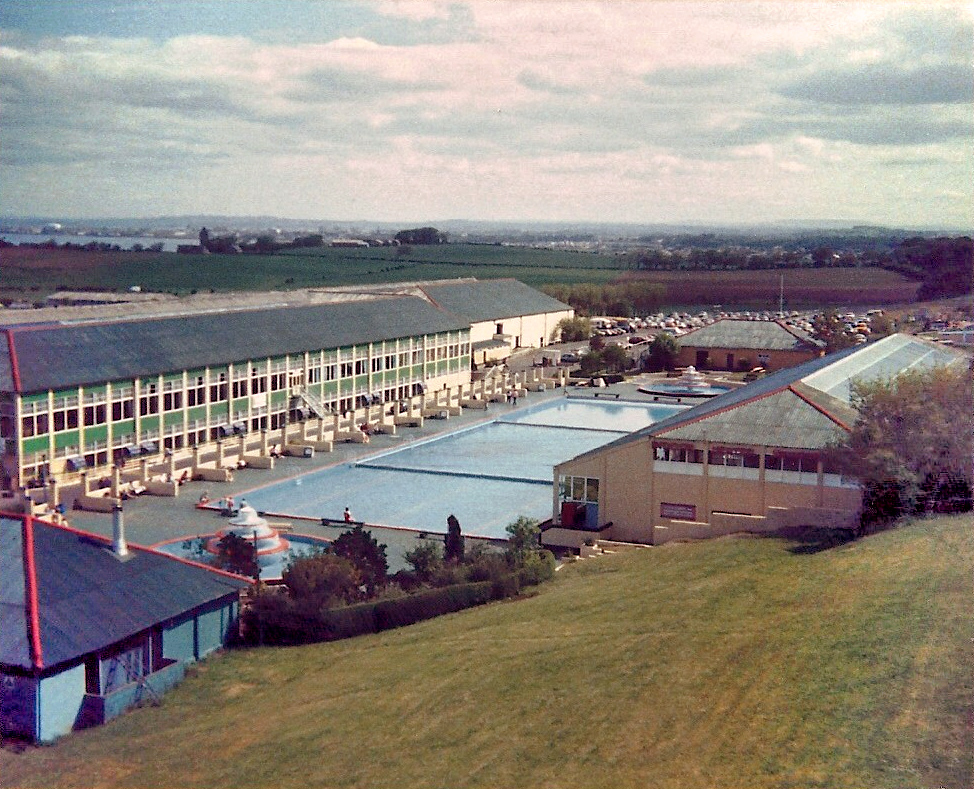
Butlins Ayr seen in 1984, The outdoor pool was demolished in the 1990s

During the Second World War the Admiralty, who had already taken over his camp at Filey, asked Billy Butlin to construct two new camps; one in North Wales and the other in Scotland. Butlin found 85 acres (34 ha) on the coast neighbouring the Heads of Ayr and opened a camp in 1940.

Butlin took back ownership of the camp from the Admiralty after the war, and in 1947 Butlins Ayr was opened to the public after some reconstruction work.

Heads of Ayr holiday camp contained all of the tried and tested Butlins ingredients: the famous Butlins Redcoats, a funfair, early morning wake up, a dining hall (with the cheers going up when a waitress dropped a plate), indoor and outdoor swimming pools, a ballroom, a boating lake, tennis courts, a sports field (for the three legged and egg & spoon races and the donkey derby), table tennis and snooker tables, an amusement arcade, a medical centre, a theatre, arcades of shops, a chairlift system and a miniature railway.

In 1987 a £25 million investment programme was announced. Work began in 1988 with £12 million used to construct a new swimming pool and upgrade the accommodation. A further £13 million investment followed over the next five years. Once the renovations were completed the camp was renamed Wonderwest World.

== Heads of Ayr Hotel ==
In 1947 Butlin began work on a hotel on the site which shared the camp's resources. It was completed in 1948 and opened as the Heads of Ayr hotel. The hotel continued to operate until the 1970s when it was closed and demolished.

== Railway station ==
On 17 May 1947 a railway station was opened for the use of the camp and the nearby hotel, shortly before nationalisation and the formation of British Rail. It was closed again on 16 September 1968.

== Haven Holidays ==
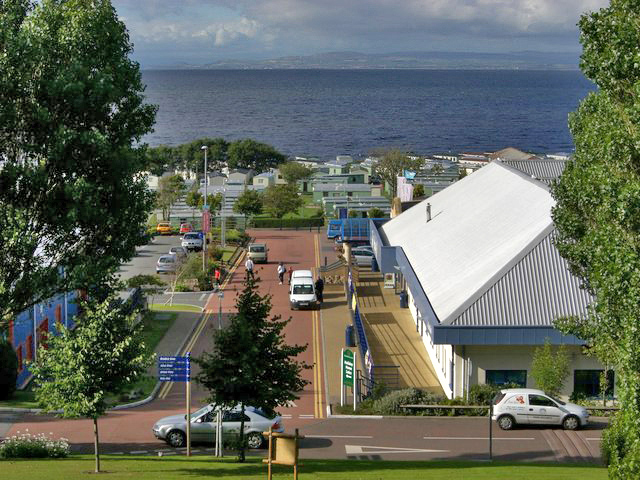
Craig Tara, seen in 2006. The building on the right is the main reception building.

In 1999 the camp became part of Haven Holidays along with the Pwllheli camp as part of an internal reorganisation within Rank Holiday Division who owned both Butlins and Haven. Since being taken over by Haven Holidays it has been renamed Craig Tara and the focus of operations has been transformed from predominantly chalet accommodation to mostly static caravan accommodation. Bourne Leisure had purchased the Ranks holiday division in the year 2000 and continued to develop this site as a Haven.

== Stephen McKerron ==
On 17 September 1988, 5 year old Stephen McKerron vanished from the camp whilst on holiday with his aunt and uncle. This led to the largest ever missing child hunt by Scottish Police, as 200 officers searched the camp and a six-mile (10 km) radius from the camp. On Sunday 2 October Stephen's body was found outside the search area by Lady MacLehose, the wife of retired diplomat and former Governor of Hong Kong Lord MacLehose of Beoch, who lived nearby. Despite a fatal incident inquiry finding death by natural causes, questions (as to how Stephen was able to walk so far by himself and whether he may have been transported by some unknown third party) remain.
