= Butlin's Pwllheli =

Former holiday camp

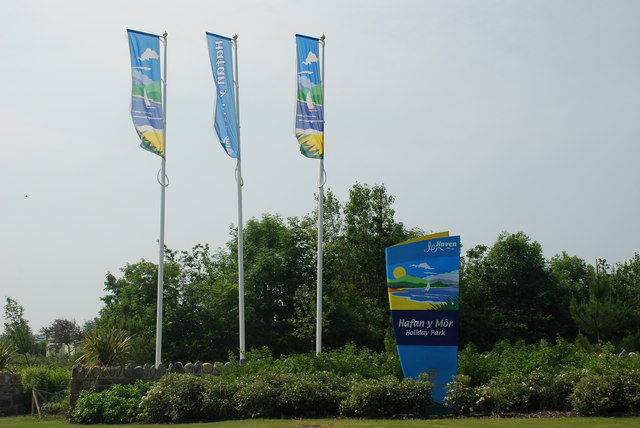

- Interactive map of Butlin's Pwllheli
- Location: Pwllheli, Wales
- Coordinates: 52°55′00″N 4°20′0″W
- Previous names: Butlin's Pwllheli (1947–1987); Pwllheli Holiday World (1987-1990); Starcoast World (1990–1999)
- Operated by: Butlins
- Established: March 1947, 01; 79 years ago
- Closed: 1998
- Website: www.haven.com/parks/wales/Hafan_Y_Mor/

Butlin's Pwllheli was a holiday camp located near Pwllheli in Wales. The site is now used by Haven Holidays for a caravan park and has been renamed Hafan y Môr. When originally opened in 1947, it was named Butlin's Pwllheli. In 1987 it was named Pwllheli Holiday World, and in 1990 it was renamed Starcoast World.

== Butlins ==
During World War II the Admiralty, who had already taken over his camp at Filey, asked Billy Butlin to construct two new camps; one in North Wales and the other in Scotland. Butlin found 150 acres of farm land on the Llŷn Peninsula in Wales. The camp opened in 1940 as HMS ''Glendower'', an overflow training camp to HMS Royal Arthur (sited at Butlins Skegness holiday camp taken over by the Admiralty on the outbreak of WW2). The Admiralty contracted with Butlin's to extend the camp in 1942. In 1946, after the war, Butlin took back ownership of the camp from the Admiralty and Butlins Pwllheli was opened to the public after some reconstruction work. The holiday camp expanded during the 1950s and 1960s with additional chalet lines and facilities. At the peak in the late 1960s it could accommodate 12,000 campers, serviced by 1,500 staff. On 9 August 1963 Her Majesty, Queen Elizabeth II and His Royal Highness The Duke of Edinburgh paid an official visit to the holiday camp.

Pwllheli holiday camp contained established Butlins ingredients: the Butlins Redcoats, funfair, early morning wake up, dining hall (with the cheers going up when a waitress drops a plate), indoor and outdoor swimming pools, a ballroom, a boating lake, tennis courts, a sports field (for the three legged and egg & spoon races and the donkey derby), table tennis and snooker tables, an amusement arcade, a medical centre, a theatre, arcades of shops, a chairlift system and a miniature railway. There were many bars and coffee bars. There was a small chapel (where visiting clergy on subsidised holidays took services) and on Sunday mornings a non-denominational service was held in the large main theatre in the Gaiety Building.

A £1 million entertainment complex at the camp, the Gaiety Building, constructed in 1962, was destroyed by fire in the early hours of 9 August 1973. No one died, although some campers suffered minor injuries. The cause was identified as faulty electrical wiring.

During the 1989 summer season, chalets were damaged by a tornado, and the 3,500 guests present had to leave. The estimated £2 million damage was a contributing factor in the later transfer of the camp to the Haven brand.

== Railway station ==
Penychain railway station, formerly known as (and still sometimes referred to as) Butlins Penychain railway station, is located at an overbridge on an unclassified lane just west of the camp. This railway station is an unstaffed halt on the Cambrian Coast Railway with passenger services to Pwllheli, Porthmadog, Harlech, Barmouth, Machynlleth and Shrewsbury. The station still serves the camp but trains only call by request.

== Haven Holidays ==
In 1999, the camp became part of Haven Holidays along with the Heads of Ayr camp as part of an internal reorganisation within The Rank Group who, at the time, owned both Butlins and Haven (both have since been purchased by the owner of British Holidays, Bourne Leisure, in 2000). Since being taken over by Haven Holidays it was renamed Hafan y Môr (Sea Haven) and the focus of operations was transformed from predominantly chalet accommodation to mostly static caravan accommodation. Most of the attractions were also removed including the chairlift, miniature railway, roller coaster and funfair.
