= Euro International school shooting =

2007 school shooting in Gurgaon, India

- Location: Gurgaon, Haryana, India
- Date: 11 December 2007; 1:00 pm
- Attack type: School shooting
- Weapon: .32 Harrison revolver
- Deaths: 1 (Abhishek Tyagi)
- Perpetrator: Akash Yadav
- Motive: Retaliation for personal conflicts and alleged bullying
- Sentence: Yadav: 3 years' juvenile detention; Yadav's father: 1 year's imprisonment; Raj Singh Dalal: 5 years' imprisonment

The Euro International school shooting occurred on 11 December 2007 at Euro International, a private secondary school in Gurgaon, Haryana, India. The gunman, 14-year-old student Akash Yadav, shot and killed 14-year-old Abhishek Tyagi. He was sentenced to three years' juvenile detention.

== Background ==
Eighth-grade student Akash Yadav had gotten into a fight with Tyagi, but it was resolved by school authorities. According to Yadav's family, Tyagi had bullied Yadav's girlfriend, once grabbing her hand against her will. The school had organised sports day on 9 December 2007 and Yadav, along with his friend, planned to shoot Tyagi, but their plan failed as Tyagi went home early. Yadav instead decided to shoot Tyagi on Tuesday as Monday was a holiday.

== Shooting ==
On 11 December, Yadav stole his father's gun, an imported .32 Harrison pistol that was left unlocked, and brought it to school in a sock before hiding it under a toilet for the rest of the day. At 9.45 am, Yadav's father, property dealer Azad Singh Yadav, arrived home from his morning walk, at which point he realised his firearm (which he had bought from a dealer the previous week along with five loaded cartridges) was missing. He called his two sons (Akash and Sumit) at school, but they denied having anything to do with it.

At 1 pm, the time of dispersal in the afternoon, Tyagi was going to his bus room when Yadav called out to him from behind. Tyagi's leg got stuck in the stair's grill while Yadav approached him and fired at close range four times, hitting once in the temple and two in the chest. Yadav then requested his friend Vikas Yadav (no relation) to fire, but he missed. Tyagi died on his way to the hospital.

== Aftermath ==
That same day, Akash Yadav was sentenced to three years' juvenile detention, whereas his father was sentenced to a year in jail for keeping an unlicensed gun at home. Raj Singh Dalal, his father's friend, with whom he owned the gun, was sentenced to 5 years' imprisonment, for failing to keep his weapon in safe custody. Yadav was released in 2008 on parole, and later became an organised criminal and gang leader with his brother Sumit. He was accused of murdering a fellow gang member in 2015.
