= Craig Tara =

Holiday camp in South Ayrshire, Scotland

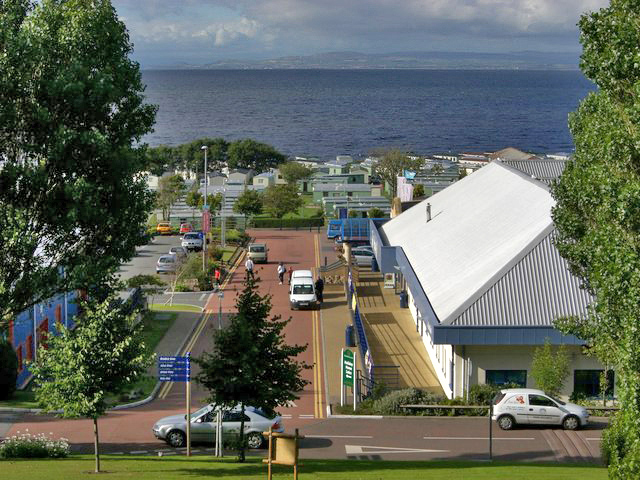
- A view of the park and its facilities

- Location within South Ayrshire
- Location: Ayr
- Coordinates: 55.432°N 4.685°W
- Previous names: Butlin’s Ayr
- Operated by: Haven Holidays
- Owner: Bourne Leisure
- Established: May 25, 1999

Craig Tara is a holiday camp located near Ayr in South Ayrshire, Scotland. It is run by Haven Holidays, who took over and renamed the former Butlin's Ayr camp in 1999.

== History ==
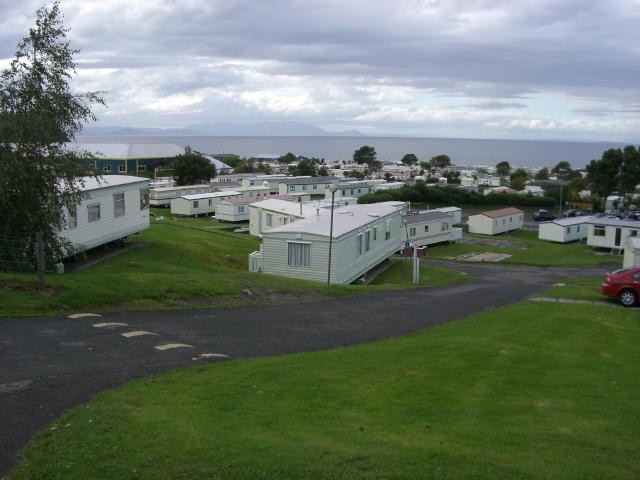
Caravans at the Haven site

The site was built just before the Second World War by Butlins but was then requisitioned becoming in 1941 a Navy training camp associated with HMS Scotia. After the Second World was over, it opened as a Butlins camp in 1947.

In 1987, the park was updated following a £25 million investment to improve the park. In 1988, the park was relaunched as "Butlin's Wonderwest World". The camp operated as a popular Scottish Butlins holiday resort until the 1990s though the resort suffered from events related to alcohol and drug consumption as well as violence in the 80s and 90s. To improve security in the park, security guards were recruited and CCTV added. The park also had a church facility and provided religious services. By 1998, the camp could hold up to 4,500 visitors and 1,500 daytrippers. In 1998, parts of Butlin's Wonderwest World were demolished.

In 1999, the camp became part of Haven Holidays, along with the Pwllheli camp, as part of an internal reorganisation within Bourne Leisure, which owned both Butlins and Haven. Haven Holidays renamed the site Craig Tara and replaced the chalet accommodation with static caravans. A £2.5 million development plan was announced at this time. The park was reopened by Kenny Dalglish. It included new luxury caravans and had some 40 to 50 permanent staff, with up to 300 seasonal workers in employment at Craig Tara.

In 2015, the swimming pool complex was completely refurbished.

== On Site ==
On the site, the complex has a variety of restaurants, bars, takeaways and an entertainment centre. There is a large swimming pool complex with flumes, slides and different pools.

There is also a mini-golf course and, in common with all Haven Parks, live shows and entertainment hosted inside the main centre. There is also a mini Costa Coffee shop.

There is a bus that runs from the park to Ayr town centre, which runs on an hourly basis and makes three different stops in the town centre.
