= List of BoBoiBoy episodes =

BoBoiBoy is a Malaysian animated series produced by Animonsta Studios. It consists of 3 seasons and 52 episodes and aired on TV3 from 13 March 2011 to 11 June 2016. It centres on BoBoiBoy, a boy with elemental superpowers, who together with his friends Yaya, Ying, Gopal, and Fang, protects Earth from alien threats, particularly Adu Du and Probe.

== Series overview ==
Season	Episodes	Originally released	
Season	Episodes	First released	Last released
1	13	March 13, 2011	January 1, 2012
2	13	May 27, 2012	March 24, 2013
3	26	January 5, 2014	June 11, 2016
Movie		March 3, 2016	

== Episodes ==
=== Season 1 (2011–12) ===
No. overall	No. in season	Title	Original release date
1	1	"The Rise of BoBoiBoy (Note: Titled "The Beginning" on Netflix)"	13 March 2011
During a school vacation, BoBoiBoy visits his grandfather, Tok Aba, to help assist him at his cocoa shop in Rintis Island. There, he becomes acquainted with his new friends namely Gopal, Yaya, and Ying. Meanwhile, an alien named Adu Du gets to know that Tok Aba's cocoa is the strongest power source, so he sends his robot, Probe, to steal a sample of it. BoBoiBoy catches Probe stealing a can of cocoa from the shop and follows him into Adu Du's spaceship. Adu Du uses the cocoa to activate a Power Ball named Ochobot. BoBoiBoy flees the spaceship after getting the cocoa can back, without realising that Ochobot follows him, believing him to be his master. After returning home, Ochobot reveals himself to BoBoiBoy and gives him a power watch, granting him elemental powers.
—	—	"BoBoiBoy - Episode 1: Extended Version"	14 March 2021
BoBoiBoy - Episode 1: Extended Version is an extended episode with special prologue and epilogue scene.
2	2	"Adu Du Attacks!"	20 March 2011
BoBoiBoy starts training to control his new powers. BoBoiBoy tries to explain his powers to his friends when Adu Du, and an upgraded Probe attack them. During the fight, BoBoiBoy was caught in Probe's grasp. Ochobot give powers to Yaya (flight and super strength), Ying (super speed) and Gopal in order to defeat Adu Du and Probe, with Gopal finding out he doesn't know what his powers are. It is also revealed that BoBoiBoy is able to separate into three clones, each possessing each three elemental powers (lightning, earth and air). Later, Adu Du sent robots to infiltrate and steal cocoa from Tok Aba's shop, but to his surprise, Tok Aba is saved by BoBoiBoy and his friends with their superpowers.
3	3	"The Multi-Monster (Note: Titled "Multi-Monster Mayhem!" on Netflix)"	27 March 2011
Adu Du sends Multi-Monster — a monster that could split into two every time he is defeated — to eat BoBoiBoy. Adu Du's plan failed because the splitting process also reduces each monster's size, splitting the monster into dozens of small creatures. Then, Adu Du decided to kidnap BoBoiBoy's friends. Coincidentally, the Multi-Monster tells BoBoiBoy that Adu Du probably wants to kidnap his friends. BoBoiBoy lets the Multi-Monster go after this, making him grateful. Before BoBoiBoy can help, Probe captures Ying after he tricks her with sleeping gas.
4	4	"Team BoBoiBoy (Note: Titled "Kidnapped!" on Netflix)"	3 April 2011
Yaya is caught right after Ying. When Gopal is captured next, he finally finds out that when he is scared, he can turn any object into food. BoBoiBoy soon arrives on Adu Du's spaceship and the four friends then races for the exit, with help from the Multi-Monsters. Gopal turns the entire inside of the ship into food, allowing them to escape.
5	5	"BoBoiBoy's Weakness (Note: Titled "With Great Power Comes... a Catch?!" on Netflix)"	3 July 2011
When Tok Aba tels BoBoiBoy to deliver the cans of cocoa to his customers, he splits into three to facilitate his work. Despite Ochobot's warnings, he uses his power too long and as a result, he suffered from a temporary memory loss. Meanwhile, Adu Du and Probe infiltrate the cocoa shop to buy his cocoa and steal Tok Aba's secret recipe book by disguising themselves, but they are recognized by Yaya and Ying. Probe upgrades into his super form and attacks them all. BoBoiBoy divides himself again to fight Probe, worsening his memory. Adu Du and Probe manages to escape from the trap made by BoBoiBoy Earth, steal the book and kidnap BoBoiBoy Lightning.
6	6	"BoBoiBoy Thunderstorm (Note: Titled "A New Form Awakens" on Netflix)"	17 July 2011
Upon realizing Tok Aba's secret "recipe" book is actually his IOU book, Adu Du, Probe and Computer torture BoBoiBoy Lightning using his fear of exploding balloons in order to make him tell them the secret recipe. As a result, BoBoiBoy Lightning turns into his upgraded form, BoBoiBoy Thunderstorm, still with memory loss. Adu Du and Probe took advantage of his memory problems and befriends BoBoiBoy Thunderstorm. Adu Du and Probe has BoBoiBoy Thunderstorm attack the heroes and he defeats them. However, Probe says BoBoiBoy's catchphrase "Awesome!", causing BoBoiBoy Thunderstorm's memory to return. BoBoiBoy Thunderstorm defeats Adu Du and Probe, and combines with BoBoiBoy Earth and Wind again.
7	7	"Game On!"	31 July 2011
BoBoiBoy and Gopal play a video game about Papa Zola, Gopal's favorite fictional superhero, ignoring Tok Aba and Ochobot's request for help in the cocoa shop. Adu Du comes up with a plan to trap BoBoiBoy and Gopal in the video game with Probe to defeat them. Ochobot and Tok Aba have to play the game in order to make BoBoiBoy and Gopal move and attack. As the levels get hard, they call Yaya and Ying to take their place. In the end, they win the game thus releasing BoBoiBoy, Gopal and even Papa Zola out of the game.
8	8	"The Dream World (Note: Titled "Justice Does Not Sleep!" on Netflix)"	20 November 2011
Upon emerging out of the game, Papa Zola appoints Gopal as his student. Later, Papa Zola faints after eating Yaya's terrible biscuit. Papa Zola's enemy, the Sleeping Monster is also released from the game and allies himself with Adu Du and Probe. The three attacks Tok Aba's house, where the Sleeping Monster traps Tok Aba, Ochobot, Ying and Yaya in his dream bubbles, sending them to the dream world. Gopal turns some of the bubbles into food while BoBoiBoy blows the remaining one around, trapping the Sleeping Monster, Adu Du, and Probe in them. After Papa Zola wakes up, he teaches Gopal the confidence to change the food-turned bubbles back so BoBoiBoy, Gopal and Papa Zola can save their friends from the dream world.
9	9	"Giant Game of Checkers (Note: Titled "Checkers" on Netflix)"	27 November 2011
To save their sleeping friends, the heroes must win a best-of-three checkers match against Sleeping Monster, but Papa Zola himself does not know how to play and loses the first round. Upon waking up, Tok Aba replaces Papa Zola and defeats the Sleeping Monster in the second round. The Sleeping Monster cheats in the final round, but Tok Aba wins the game anyway. The monster refuses to accept his loss so he put Tok Aba, Ochobot, Yaya, Ying and even Adu Du and Probe to sleep again. Papa Zola passes out after his foot gets hurt by a large broken piece of the checkerboard. Before passing out, Papa Zola hands his enlarging belt to Gopal, who passes the belt to BoBoiBoy because he is scared. Using the belt to match the Sleeping Monster's size, BoBoiBoy defeats the monster and everyone is safely sent back to the real world.
10	10	"BoBoiBoy's Fan Mails (Note: Titled "Fan Mail" on Netflix)"	4 December 2011
On Adu Du's order, Probe steals all of BoBoiBoy's fan letters and answers them, but Adu Du is away to buy some clothes, so Probe answers them with Computer. Probe and Computer answer the letters honestly while the episode displays some clips from previous episodes. Adu Du returns right after Probe and Computer finish replying the letters. Adu Du is angered that they don't defame BoBoiBoy while answering, and the only remaining letter that Adu Du gets to answer himself is actually sent by Probe.
11	11	"World Biscuit Day (Note: Titled "Cookie Casualty" on Netflix)"	11 December 2011
Gopal, Ying and BoBoiBoy are watching soap opera Seguni Mawar Merah on TV until they realise that today is the World's Biscuit Day. Gopal and Ying run away to avoid Yaya who wants to ask them to help her make biscuits, leaving only BoBoiBoy to help Yaya. As BoBoiBoy also has to help Tok Aba in his shop, BoBoiBoy split into three and BoBoiBoy Wind is the one who has to help Yaya. BoBoiBoy Wind is tasked to find the biscuit's ingredients, including some goat milk. Inspired by Probe's tearful reaction to Seguni Mawar Merah, Adu Du creates a fake goat milk that contains "Chemical Emotive X", a substance that can make human feelings unstable. BoBoiBoy Wind buys the fake milk and eats one of the biscuits after Yaya finishes making them. The contaminated biscuit causes BoBoiBoy Wind to become uncontrollably excited and he flies away to give away the biscuits. Yaya meets BoBoiBoy Earth, BoBoiBoy Lightning and Ying in the cocoa shop and they realise that Yaya's biscuits has made people go mad. BoBoiBoy Wind comes to the shop and eats too many biscuits until he is too joyful and transforms into the new power of "BoBoiBoy Cyclone".
12	12	"BoBoiBoy Cyclone & Bago Go (Note: Titled "Getting a Little Windy In Here" on Netflix)"	18 December 2011
Adu Du and Probe tries to attack BoBoiBoy Cyclone while he is distracted, but they fail and flee after Cyclone forces Adu Du to eat Yaya's biscuits. BoBoiBoy Lightning and BoBoiBoy Earth try to convinces Cyclone to recombine with them. When Cyclone insults them as weak, Lightning turns into Thunderstorm and fights Cyclone. When Cyclone is distracted by the fight, BoBoiBoy Earth traps him. Ochobot forces BoBoiBoy Cyclone to watch the ending scene of Seguni Mawar Merah, making him sad and reverting him to BoBoiBoy Wind. Later, Adu Du calls an illegal weapon vendor Bago Go to buy some weapons. Adu Du faints as the price offered by Bago Go is extremely expensive. While Adu Du is unconscious, Probe sells Adu Du's spaceship for an Electric Spatula and the purchase coincidentally comes with a free combat robot called Mukalakus. Meanwhile, BoBoiBoy Earth struggles to unlock his upgraded form. Tok Aba tells him to pack since his vacation is about to end.
13	13	"Season Finale (Note: Titled "Finale – Shake It Up" on Netflix)"	25 December 2011
While BoBoiBoy and his friends are saddened that BoBoiBoy is going to leave, they are attacked by Adu Du using Mukalakus, with energy generated by Tok Aba's cocoa that they previously buy. Mukalakus knocks out Yaya, Ying, and Gopal before running out of power. Probe captures Ochobot in order to make him Mukalakus' new energy source. Adu Du now easily defeats BoBoiBoy's three forms, leaving only BoBoiBoy Earth standing. As Adu Du continues to hurt his friend, BoBoiBoy Earth transforms into his upgraded form, BoBoiBoy Earthquake, who has a giant earth golem to match Mukalakus. Once the two other BoBoiBoys recover, the three destroy Mukalakus, rescuing Ochobot and the others, before combining and passing out.
—	—	"Extended Finale"	1 January 2012
Three days after Mukalakus' defeat, Tok Aba accompanies BoBoiBoy to the railway station and is later joined by BoBoiBoy's friends to bid farewell to BoBoiBoy. When BoBoiBoy steps into the train, he passes by a mysterious boy who is leaving the train. Meanwhile, Adu Du vows that he will return soon, before being called by Probe to come into their new underground hideout in the junkyard. Six months later at Rintis Island Elementary School, BoBoiBoy arrives as a new student. Note: This is a part of episode 13 that wasn't included in the episode's premiere.

=== Season 2 (2012–13) ===
No. overall	No. in season	Title	Original release date
14	1	"The Return of BoBoiBoy (Note: Titled "Welcome Back, BoBoiBoy!" on Netflix)"	27 May 2012
Six months after his vacation in Rintis Island, BoBoiBoy fully moves to the island to live with his grandfather, Tok Aba, and attends his friends' school. One of his classmates is the mysterious boy that he passes by six months ago and Papa Zola has become their mathematics teacher. The mysterious classmate spies on BoBoiBoy and for some reason, Ochobot faints upon seeing him. While in school, Gopal tells BoBoiBoy not to use ordinary roads that lead to his home, as the roads pass by a 'haunted house', and suggests BoBoiBoy to take a much longer route. However, BoBoiBoy ignores the advice of his best friend and takes the road passing by the 'haunted house'. BoBoiBoy decides to walk through the gate of the house and into its frontyard, feeling a presence that he's being watched.
15	2	"The Haunted House"	3 June 2012
At Tok Aba's Kokotiam, Kumar (Gopal's father) tells Tok Aba and the rest of the customers about the haunted house for several hours. It spurs BoBoiBoy to investigate more deeply about the house, asking Gopal to help film the 'ghost'. Probe is also interested in the ghost house and tells Adu Du to go there to woo the 'ghost' to be a member of their team. As expected, BoBoiBoy meets Adu Du in the haunted house, accusing him to be the 'ghost'. However, their argument is interrupted by Fang, the mysterious classmate who is jealous of BoBoiBoy as he constantly hears praises about him before BoBoiBoy's return. Fang reveals that he has a power watch himself, granting him the power to create shadows that almost rival forces of the three elements of BoBoiBoy. After attacking a fleeing Adu Du and Probe, he attacks BoBoiBoy next, who fights back, showing his new power to turn into his upgraded elemental forms without separating. In the end, Fang flees when the sun goes down, and Adu Du punishes Probe by burning his horror story books.
16	3	"BoBoiBoy vs. Fang (Note: Titled "Physical Education" on Netflix)"	10 June 2012
Papa Zola teaches physical education classes and has the students play egg-and-spoon race. Because BoBoiBoy and Fang call the sport 'childish' and 'unchallenging', Papa Zola orders them to race against each other, with a special Ruler P from Papa Zola as the prize. Both opponents compete fiercely on the track and had to use their super powers just to beat each other, but the race ended with an unexpected result as Papa Zola win the race, and causes dissatisfaction from Fang. Fang explains several past events that causes him to not like BoBoiBoy. To settle the rivalry, BoBoiBoy suggests a football match between him and Fang in the next week, which Fang accepts.
17	4	"The Football Game (Note: Titled "Football Fight!" on Netflix)"	24 June 2012
As arranged the previous week, BoBoiBoy with Gopal, Yaya, Ying and Iwan form a team for the football match. Meanwhile, Fang forms a team with Adu Du, Probe and their two new robots, since he doesn't know how to play football. Papa Zola becomes the referee in the match, ordering both teams not to play dirty and not to use their superpowers. However, during the match, Papa Zola is knocked out by a strong kick from Yaya, who was aiming for Probe, as he was mocking her. Without referee watching them, Adu Du and Probe uses various ways to beat BoBoiBoy by cheating. Team BoBoiBoy soon decide to use their powers to counter Team Fang's cheating. In the end, team BoBoiBoy win because of Iwan is hit by a ball and accidentally scores the winning goal. After the match, Papa Zola punishes Adu Du, Probe, and Fang for burning the soccer net with their cheating.
18	5	"The Revenge of Adu Du (Note: Titled "Late for School" on Netflix)"	26 August 2012
BoBoiBoy and Gopal begins investigating why Ochobot fainted at the sight of Fang. They find out that he buys Yaya's biscuits every day before going to school and follow him to an alley where they get attacked by a crazy cat. This causes them to arrive late at school and risks getting punished by Yaya. They try to avoid Yaya by entering through the staff room to avoid Yaya, but they are distracted by a big poster commemorating Yaya's accomplishment at school. Yaya finds them and punishes them for entering the teachers' room, a restricted area for students. When they are cleaning the school yard as a punishment, they were interrupted by a Probe shooting BoBoiBoy, Fang and Gopal with a shrink ray.
19	6	"Tiny Boys (Note: Titled "Giant Mini World" on Netflix)"	9 September 2012
Now shruken, BoBoiBoy, Gopal and Fang decide to go to Tok Aba's shop to get Yaya and Ying's help. However, they must go through the alley with the crazy cat again. Fang shows them how to pass the alley safely: by feeding the cat Yaya's terrible-tasting biscuits. After that, Yaya and Ying takes them to Adu Du's lair to find a cure. After returning to their normal sizes, BoBoiBoy asks Fang why Ochobot faints every time he sees his face.
20	7	"Uncontrollable Emotions (Note: Titled "Emotive Chemical Y" on Netflix)"	9 December 2012
BoBoiBoy asks Fang why Ochobot faints every time he sees his face, but Fang doesn't know the answer either. At night, Ochobot has nightmares about being grabbed by Fang, leading to BoBoiBoy suspecting that Fang gains his power from kidnapping Ochobot. Meanwhile, after hearing the proposal Probe on recycling old ideas, Adu Du modifies Liquid Emotions X to Pistol Emotions Y. Adu Du shoots BoBoiBoy, Yaya, Ying, Gopal and Fang with the pistol, which changes their personalities.
21	8	"Fang's Past (Note: Titled "Fang and Ochobot's Secret" on Netflix)"	16 December 2012
Since BoBoiBoy, Ying, Yaya, Gopal and Fang are too unstable, blindfolded Ochobot guides them to Adu Du's lair to find the cure. The five of them are faced with traps set by Adu Du and Probe, while Ochobot and Fang gradually remembers how Fang gains power; before BoBoiBoy returned to the island, Adu Du and Probe tricked Fang into bringing Ochobot to their lair. As Ochobot fled, Fang decided to help him, so Ochobot gave Fang his shadow powers. Fang lost control of his powers, forcing Ochobot to do so at the cost of their memories. After remembering this in the present, Ochobot no longer faints when he sees Fang's face.
22	9	"Battle for the Underground/MKHIPI (Note: Titled "Mornings with Mr. Probe and Adu Du" on Netflix)"	23 December 2012
BoBoiBoy and friends fight and defeat Adu Du's Recycled Tiger robot in order to seize the antidote. BoBoiBoy also apologizes to Fang for his suspicions. After their defeat, Adu Du and Probe try to defame BoBoiBoy by broadcasting a talk show titled Mornings with Mr. Probe and Adu Du where they negatively portray BoBoiBoy's actions. However, their plan is unsuccessful as only four people and a cat watch their show.
23	10	"Close Encounters (Note: Titled "First Contact" on Netflix)"	30 December 2012
Ejo Jo, Adu Du's rival back in their home planet Ata Ta Tiga, has found out about Adu Du's plan to steal cocoa from Earth after buying his spaceship from Bago Go. In addition, Probe sells their headquarters to Bago Go to buy a birthday gift for Adu Du, a goat claimed to be Lawn Mower. Ejo Jo has bought the headquarters too and contacts Adu Du to let him know that he is coming. Adu Du tries to make Ejo Jo stay away by warning him about BoBoiBoy and friends, but Ejo Jo insists on coming to Earth, showing his combat robot and armor to prove that he is ready to fight them.
24	11	"The Math Test (Note: Titled "Pop Quiz" on Netflix)"	10 March 2013
Papa Zola announces a math exam to be held after the break. BoBoiBoy learns that Ying and Yaya are rivals during exams. In order to have a victory against BoBoiBoy before Ejo Jo's arrival, Adu Du poses as a student to partake in the exam. Even though his identity is caught, Papa Zola allows him to join the exam anyway. Meanwhile, Probe uses a weather-controlling machine to disrupt them. Midway through the exam, Ejo Jo's spaceship arrives at the school.
25	12	"Battle of Ejo Jo (Part 1) (Note: Titled "Ejo Jo Attacks!" on Netflix)"	17 March 2013
BoBoiBoy, Yaya, Ying, Gopal, and Fang face Ejo Jo, while Adu Du and Probe also show up to prevent Ejo Jo from taking over their operations on Earth. To show how inferior Probe is as a combat robot, Ejo Jo introduces his combat robot PETAI and has it attack Probe until he is barely alive. When Ejo Jo orders PETAI to attack Adu Du, Probe protects his boss from the attack and is destroyed in the process. Adu Du tries to attack Ejo Jo in anger, but Ejo Jo knocks him out. BoBoiBoy, Yaya, Ying, Gopal, and Fang then fight PETAI, but they are unable to defeat it because of its energy shield. Ejo Jo then has PETAI kidnap Ochobot then dig underneath the school to destroy it. While the rest go to evacuate Papa Zola and their classmates, BoBoiBoy goes after PETAI, freeing Ochobot, before stabilizing the school. Fang spots Ochobot and goes to protect him, but PETAI kidnaps the rest of the class. BoBoiBoy creates a duststorm as a cover, while he retreats with Fang, Ochobot, and Adu Du.
26	13	"Battle of Ejo Jo (Part 2) (Note: Titled "Goodbye, Probe" on Netflix)"	24 March 2013
BoBoiBoy, Fang, Ochobot, and Tok Aba take refuge in Adu Du's lair, but Adu Du tells them that Ejo Jo will come as he already had already bought the place. Adu Du seemingly refuses to help and tells Ejo Jo about their location instead. When Ejo Jo launches PETAI above the headquarters, BoBoiBoy fights it, hiding that he is merely buying time for Fang to create a Shadow Dragon. Fang's dragon defeats PETAI, leaving only its power core, and Fang passes out afterwards. Ejo Jo decides to fight BoBoiBoy on his own using his armor. Meanwhile, it is revealed that Adu Du has repaired Mukalakus.

=== Season 3 (2014–16) ===
No. overall	No. in season	Title (Note: Title card informations are taken from the beginning of each episode. Only episodes from "Mr. Baga Ga's Service" have a title card.)	Original release date
27	1	"BoBoiBoy vs. Ejo Jo Part 1 (Note: Titled "BoBoiBoy VS Ejo Jo" on Netflix)"	5 January 2014
By using Yaya, Ying, and Gopal's power watches in his armor, Ejo Jo defeats BoBoiBoy until Adu Du in the Mukalakus robot intervenes. Adu Du reveals to BoBoiBoy that he leaked the location so they can fight Ejo Jo together. BoBoiBoy and Adu Du defeat Ejo Jo and take back the power watches. Meanwhile, Tok Aba and Ochobot sneak onto Ejo Jo's spaceship and rescue the captured students and Papa Zola. As BoBoiBoy, Adu Du, Gopal, Ying, and Yaya corner Ejo Jo, it turns out that he has stolen Fang's power watch. Ejo Jo throws away Yaya, Ying, and Gopal's power watches from BoBoiBoy's hands and traps them in a Shadow Coccoon.
28	2	"BoBoiBoy vs. Ejo Jo Finale (Note: Titled "BoBoiBoy VS Ejo Jo – Final Battle" on Netflix)"	12 January 2014
While Ejo Jo prepares to create a Shadow Dragon, Tok Aba and Papa Zola use Ying and Yaya's power watches in an attempt to stop Ejo Jo. They fail, but Iwan manages to use Gopal's power to free BoBoiBoy, Adu Du, Gopal, Ying, and Yaya in time. Ejo Jo attempts to use his Shadow Dragon to devour everyone, but BoBoiBoy manages to stop him by directly attacking Ejo Jo, taking back Fang's power watch and forcing Ejo Jo to flee in his spaceship.
29	3	"In Memory of Probe (Probe Dalam Ingatan)"	19 January 2014
Papa Zola fails every student for the math exam that Adu Du disrupted and makes an extra class obligatory for every student, including the absent Adu Du. Meanwhile, Adu Du unsuccessfully attempts to reactivate Probe using Petai's power core, so Computer and Lawn Mower contact Bago Go, who tells Adu Du that he needs to buy a power converter to make a power core that fits Probe's old model. In order to pay Bago Go with cocoa, Adu Du sics the Cocoa Jumbo on Tok Aba's Cocoa Shop.
30	4	"Operation Cocoa (Kerjasama BuBaDiBaKo)"	26 January 2014
Contrary to his name, Cocoa Jumbo is too small to attack Tok Aba's Cocoa Shop. Instead, Tok Aba, BoBoiBoy, and Gopal agree to help Adu Du restore Probe if Adu Du becomes a good person and attends class with them. BoBoiBoy, Gopal, and Adu Du help people in the neighborhood in order to raise money to buy the five barrels of cocoa that Adu Du needs. Adu Du acquires the power converter from Bago Go, creates a new power core for Probe, and starts reactivating him.
31	5	"Cocoa Jumbo's Rampage (Amukan Koko Jumbo)"	2 February 2014
Probe's reactivation is apparently unsuccessful. BoBoiBoy, Gopal, and Adu Du receive the news that Cocoa Jumbo, who has become gigantic by eating cocoa, is rampaging on the island. They are unable to defeat him, but Probe in a new battle mode appears and defeats Cocoa Jumbo. However, Probe doesn't have his old memory and nearly attacks BoBoiBoy and Gopal until Adu Du restores his memory by throwing a mug at him.
32	6	"Mr. Baga Ga's Service (Khidmat Wak Baga Ga)"	4 December 2014
Adu Du and Probe contact Bago Go to ask for help because Probe still has memory issues. Bago Go sends his identical doctor brother Baga Ga to Adu Du and Probe. Baga Ga pretends that he is using expensive medical method to cure Probe, while he actually just fixes some disconnected wires inside Probe. After Baga Ga leaves, Bago Go arrives, causing Probe to suspect that he is Baga Ga and threatens to shoot him. Bago Go admits that Baga Ga scammed them, and gives back the money that Baga Ga took and their spaceship as an apology. However, Baga Ga is revealed to be Bago Go's brother, prompting Probe to shoot both.
33	7	"Rob, Robert and Roberto Santana's Robbery (Rompakan Rob, Robert & Roberto Santana)"	8 December 2014
When Adu Du and Probe want to tell BoBoiBoy that their spaceship is going to return, BoBoiBoy is too busy helping people on the island. The crew receives news that a trio of robbers, Rob, Robert, and Roberto, are robbing a bank and holding people hostage inside the safe. Adu Du attempts to force the safe door open, but the robbers close it again and wounds Adu Du's arm. BoBoiBoy comes up with a plan to drink some juice to make the robber thirsty and tempted, then gives them the juice so that they need to urinate and get out of the safe on their own, allowing the police to capture them.
34	8	"The Arrival of the Five Sly Scammers! (5 Panglima Scammer)"	9 December 2014
Adu Du's spaceship arrives and Bago Go explains that Ejo Jo sold it back to pay for his hospital bills. However, Bago Go's brothers the Five Sly Scammers want revenge because Adu Du and Probe have tricked and shot Baga Ga. Since Adu Du refuses to apologize, the scammer brothers use their spaceships to attack the island. BoBoiBoy and friends board Adu Du's spaceship and try to draw them away from the civilians. Since Adu Du's arm is broken, Yaya pilots the spaceship and brings them to the moon.
35	9	"The Battle on the Moon (Pertarungan Di Bulan) (Note: It is also known as "Scambot vs. Junkyardbot (ScamBot vs SampahBot)")"	10 December 2014
On the moon, the Five Sly Scammers form a robot from their spaceships, so BoBoiBoy and friends do the same with Adu Du's. However, Adu Du's spaceship robot is outdated, so Yaya and Ying use their powers so it can fight properly. When the scammers' robot beats Adu Du's, Gopal turns some rocks into a pile of gold to distract the greedy scammers while Adu Du hijacks their robot and stomps them with it.
36	10	"Papa Zola & Mama Zila"	11 December 2014
Papa Zola misses his wife Mama Zila, so BoBoiBoy, Gopal, and Papa Zola reuse Adu Du's technology to enter a Papa Zola video game so they can bring Mama Zila out of it. However, when they reach the final level and bring Mama Zila to the real world, Mama Zila is angered by the room's messiness and turns into a monster.
37	11	"Mama Zila Attacks (Serangan Mama Zila)"	15 December 2014
Mama Zila goes on a rampage in the city, trying to make everything ordered the way she likes. As Papa Zola doesn't want Mama Zila to get hurt, BoBoiBoy exhausts her instead before bringing her back to the game, where they properly defeat her. When Mama Zila is brought to the real world again, everyone cleans up the room in order not to anger her.
38	12	"Adu Du's Mom (Ketibaan Ibu Adu Du)"	16 December 2014
Adu Du is visited by his mom, who is disappointed that Adu Du doesn't want her help and that he has become good. Adu Du's mother promptly attacks BoBoiBoy and his friends, whom she blames for turning Adu Du into a good person. During the fight, Adu Du's mother exaggerated how hard BoBoiBoy hit her, angering Adu Du who swears revenge on BoBoiBoy.
39	13	"Adu Du's Return to Evil (Adu Du Kembali Jahat)"	17 December 2014
Before returning home, Adu Du's mother gifts him a credit card with unlimited money, allowing him to fund his revenge against BoBoiBoy. On the next school day, Adu Du goes to school, pretending like nothing happened. When Papa Zola starts another exam, the school is suddenly attacked by Pango Robot.
40	14	"PangoBot and the Onion Monster (Robot Pango & Raksasa Bawang)"	26 December 2014
Pango Robot is piloted by Rob, Robert, and Roberto whom Adu Du secretly freed. Pango Robot is helped by Onion Monster whose smell can make everyone cry. While Pango Robot and Onion Monster are driven away by BoBoiBoy and friends, Adu Du secretly obtain samples of BoBoiBoy's elemental weapons, fingerprints, tears, and hair.
41	15	"The Arsonist (Misteri Penjenayah Api)"	16 January 2015
BoBoiBoy has been feeling exhausted lately due to helping so many people and has nightmares about an arsonist. He and his friends realize that many fire incidents have been happening in the island, so they investigate who could be the culprit. While reviewing a security footage, they find out that Adu Du and Probe were at the school's warehouse at night when a fire started there. Upon being interrogated, Adu Du admits that he has become evil again, although he reveals that it was not him who started the fire, rather the arsonist was BoBoiBoy himself.
42	16	"BoBoiBoy Fire Ignites! (Bahaya BoBoiBoy Api!) (Note: It is also known as "Fire Danger")"	5 February 2015
In order to verify Adu Du's claim, BoBoiBoy's friends and Tok Aba watch over him sleeping. BoBoiBoy indeed turns into BoBoiBoy Fire when sleeping, but he explains that the fires were not intentional and he just wants to have fun after helping so many people. Adu Du and Probe attacks them and although BoBoiBoy Fire defeat them, they manage to get a sample of BoBoiBoy's fire power.
43	17	"Danger: BoBoiBot (BoBoiBot Bersedia) (Note: It is also known as "BoBoiBoybot Arrives")"	12 March 2015
Adu Du announces to the entire Rintis Island that BoBoiBoy is the arsonist. Adu Du argues that they need a new superhero and introduces BoBoiBot, a robotic replica of BoBoiBoy. BoBoiBot demonstrates not only how it is stronger than BoBoiBoy, but how it can control his fire power unlike BoBoiBoy.
44	18	"Everybody Loves BoBoiBot (Bahagia Bersama BoBoiBot)"	3 April 2015
BoBoiBoy and BoBoiBot compete on who can help people better, with BoBoiBot outshining BoBoiBoy every time. Once the citizens rely on BoBoiBot, Adu Du starts charging expensive fees for BoBoiBot's service and eventually extorts them. Meanwhile, Probe is jealous that BoBoiBot has become Adu Du's new favorite robot and tells BoBoiBoy that BoBoiBot's weakness is water.
45	19	"BoBoiBoy's Water Surprise (Kejutan BoBoiBoy Air)"	30 September 2015
Ochobot scans BoBoiBoy and confirms that there are untapped water power within him. BoBoiBoy's friend surmise that he needs to be calmed down to awaken his power, something Papa Zola manages to do with a massage. When BoBoiBoy Water turns out to be lazy and unfit, Papa Zola trains him until he is ready to fight BoBoiBot. While BoBoiBoy gains an advantage in his fight against BoBoiBot, he is soon outnumbered when BoBoiBot splits into three.
46	20	"Rise Up! BoBoiBoy Water! (Bangkit BoBoiBoy Air!)"	12 December 2015
In spite of being outnumbered, BoBoiBoy Water manages to defeat BoBoiBot. Adu Du uses a sample of BoBoiBoy's water to give BoBoiBot new water power, but this also causes it to look unfit too. Because Adu Du calls it useless, BoBoiBot attempts to use his water power to drown the city. While BoBoiBot has become waterproof, BoBoiBoy realizes that it is vulnerable to being electrocuted through its water, allowing him to destroy BoBoiBot using Thunderstorm power. Meanwhile, in Bago Go's hospital in outer space, Ejo Jo breaks free and proclaims that he is going back for BoBoiBoy.
47	21	"Special Episode: Saving Planet Earth Part 1 (Episod Khas: Jagalah Bumi (Bahagian 1))"	17 December 2015
In class, BoBoiBoy and his classmates are ordered to clean their class as Mama Zila is inspecting them. They then learn how to recycle, as they have to make a project for the National Recycling Day. However, they are interrupted by Shield Monster, who wants to fight BoBoiBoy.
48	22	"Special Episode: Saving Planet Earth Part 2 (Episod Khas: Jagalah Bumi (Bahagian 2))"	19 December 2015
Shield Monster utilizes the surrounding garbage as his shield, so BoBoiBoy and friends clean up the island while fighting him. Adu Du and Probe witness the fight and decide to be Supervillain Jero-Jero whose job is to help evil people like the Shield Monster. BoBoiBoy and friends manage to defeat and capture the Shield Monster and drive Adu Du and Probe away. Meanwhile, Ejo Jo receives the report that Shield Monster has lost and decides to return to Earth.
49	23	"Special Episode: Saving Planet Earth Part 3 (Episod Khas: Jagalah Bumi (Bahagian 3))"	20 December 2015
BoBoiBoy and friends hold an Earth Day Carnival at their school, but Fang suddenly leaves without explanation. Meanwhile, Adu Du and Probe decide to rescue the Shield Monster, who no longer wants to attack BoBoiBoy and just wants to flee. The three destroy the carnival and flee. Before departing in a spaceship, Shield Monster explains to Adu Du and Probe that he was paid by Ejo Jo to gain new data on BoBoiBoy. Meanwhile, Fang secretly responds to a message from outer space.
50	24	"Enemies, Old and New (Musuh Baru & Lama)"	28 May 2016
Adu Du and Probe meet BoBoiBoy, Gopal, Yaya, and Ying to warn them about Ejo Jo's return. However, the moment Ejo Jo returns with improved armor and Petai robots, he is defeated by alien Captain Kaizo and his lieutenant Lahap, who scare Adu Du and Probe away. Fang arrives and reveals that he is an alien working to get BoBoiBoy and his friends' power bands for Kaizo. Fang fights BoBoiBoy to prove his loyalty to Kaizo, until he is reminded that BoBoiBoy is his friend.
51	25	"Between Friend and Foe (Antara Kawan & Lawan)"	4 June 2016
Fang refuses to attack his friends, causing Kaizo and BoBoiBoy to fight over him and over whether BoBoiBoy is worthy of his superpower. Meanwhile, Lahap fights Yaya, Ying, and Gopal using his ability to copy the attributes of anything he eats. Kaizo and Lahap defeat their opponents and are about to finish them off before Fang steals BoBoiBoy, Yaya, Ying, and Gopal's power bands in order to spare them. Kaizo, Lahap, and Fang depart on Kaizo's spaceship. BoBoiBoy enlists Adu Du's help to reach Kaizo's spaceship and rescue Fang.
52	26	"See You Next Time, BoBoiBoy (Jumpa Lagi BoBoiBoy)"	11 June 2016
As BoBoiBoy, Gopal, Yaya, and Ying enter Kaizo's spaceship, Fang steals back their power bands from Kaizo. Gopal, Yaya, and Ying have a rematch with Lahap where they defeat him by tricking him into eating soft vegetables. BoBoiBoy and Fang fight Kaizo and combine their power to land a major hit on him. Impressed by their strength, Kaizo deems them worthy of their power and invites them to join his crew to protect other Power Spheres in the galaxy. Disagreeing with Kaizo's methods, they decline the offer and decide to use their powers on their own to protect Earth. Fang also reveals Kaizo as his brother.

== Movie ==
Title	Directed by	Written by	Original release date
BoBoiBoy The Movie	Nizam Razak	Nizam Razak; Anas Abdul Aziz	March 3, 2016
