= HMS Scotia =

Royal Naval Reserve unit in Rosyth, Scotland

Coordinates: 56.033°N 3.449°W

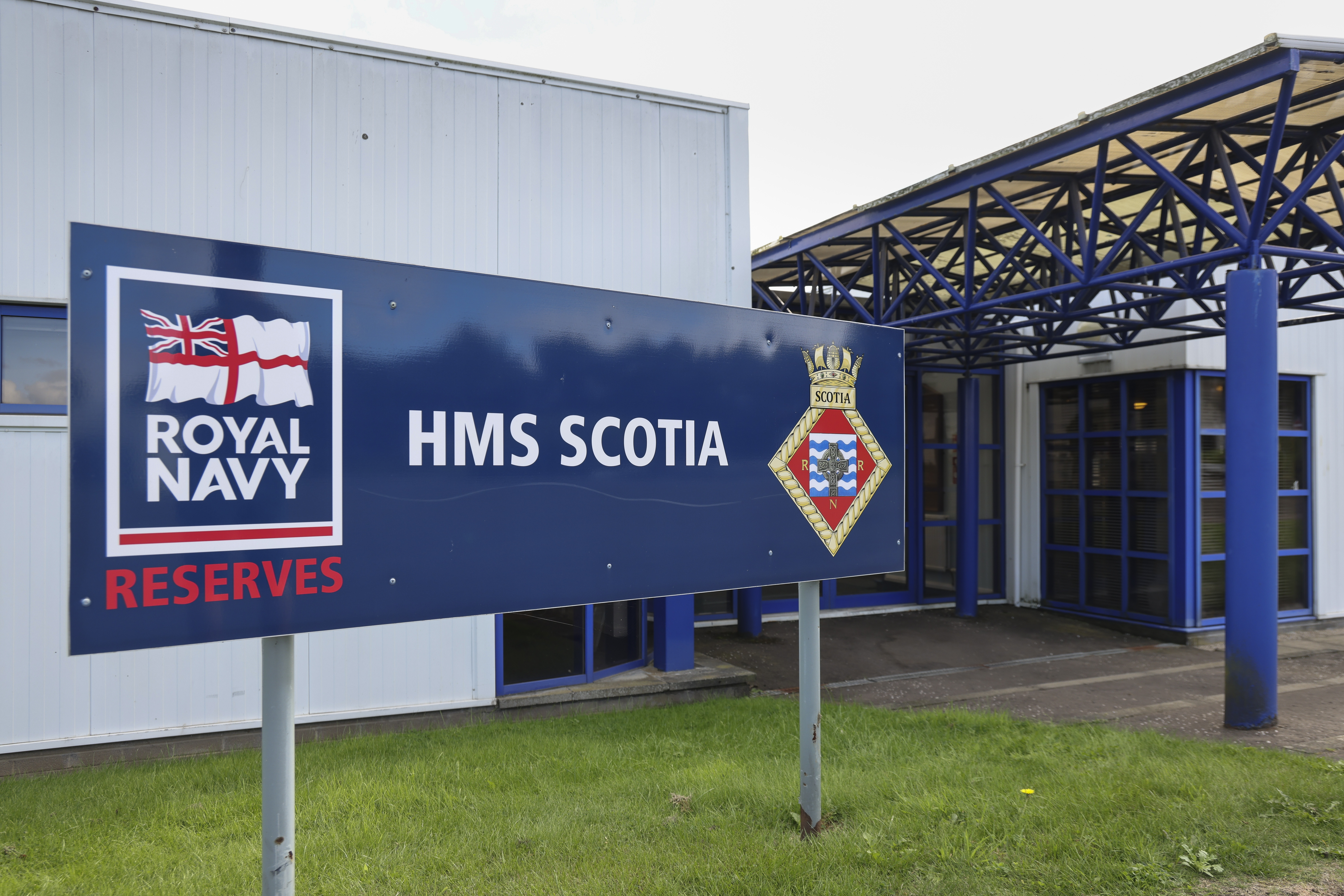

History

United Kingdom
- Name: HMS Scotia
- Commissioned: 1958
- Status: Currently operational
- Badge

General characteristics
- Class & type: Stone frigate

HMS Scotia is a Royal Naval Reserve unit. It was formed in 1958, then reorganised in 1994 and currently recruits volunteers from the east of Scotland. The unit has accommodation and other facilities, headquartered in Rosyth Naval Dockyard.

== History ==
The unit is part of the Volunteer Reserve activity of the Royal Navy Scotland. In August 1903 the Admiralty appointed the first two commanding officers of the then RNVR to form divisions in London and on the Clyde.

Lieutenant Commander (later Commodore) The Duke of Montrose raised the Clyde Division based in Glasgow, and the division rapidly expanded across Scotland, first to Dundee onboard the sailing frigate, HMS Unicorn, and then to Edinburgh, onboard the monitor, renamed HMS Claverhouse. These two East Coast divisions were, many years later, to form the heart of the modern HMS Scotia.

Under the 1994 defence review all three of these original Scottish Sea Training Centres, Glasgow, Edinburgh and Dundee, were combined into two units of a different type, HMS Scotia in Fife and HMS Dalriada in Greenock. Both of these had been units formed in the Cold War to support nearby naval headquarters, and both were rapidly expanded to accommodate the closing units. In the case of Scotia, this required a complete rebuild.

=== Timeline ===
- 1958 - HQ Unit formed at MHQ (Maritime Headquarters) Pitreavie
- 1960 - Name of HMS Scotia adopted. The previous ship of that name was a wartime shore training establishment in Ayr (currently a holiday park Craig Tara).
- 1962 - Crest of HMS Scotia matriculated on 5 Sep 1962 by Lord Lyon, King of Arms, in the Public Register of Arms and Bearings in Scotland.
- 1962 - HMS Scotia moved out of MHQ into accommodation above ground at Pitreavie.
- 1994 - HMS Scotia absorbed 267 reservists from HMS Camperdown and Claverhouse to become the largest RNR establishment in the UK with 375 personnel. Re-designated a Reserve Training centre on 1 Oct 1994.
- 1996 - Moved to a new site within Royal Naval Support Establishment HMS Caledonia on 15 May 1996. Official rededication ceremony conducted on 12 Oct 1996 in the presence of Prince Michael of Kent as Honorary Commodore RNR.
- 1999 - Tay Division of HMS Scotia set up in Dundee.
- 2000 - Forth Division of HMS Scotia set up in Edinburgh.
- 2004 - Forth Division closes
- 2024 - HMS Scotia celebrated its 30th anniversary as a reserve training centre.

== Tay and Forth Divisions ==
Scotia's Satellites units were established as it was recognised that its distance from the city centres of Edinburgh and Dundee was inhibiting recruitment at a time when the Royal Navy's demand for reservists was growing. Scotia became the testbed for a scheme to extend the RNR footprint with the first satellite unit, the Tay Division of HMS Scotia in Dundee, which started training in 1999 and remains active. Tay was soon followed by another Scotia satellite, Forth Division, in Edinburgh, however the Forth Division in Edinburgh closed in 2004.

== See also ==
- Armed forces in Scotland
- Military history of Scotland
