= HMS Caledonia (shore establishment) =

Royal Navy establishment in Scotland

His Majesty’s Ship Caledonia
- Near Rosyth, Fife in Scotland
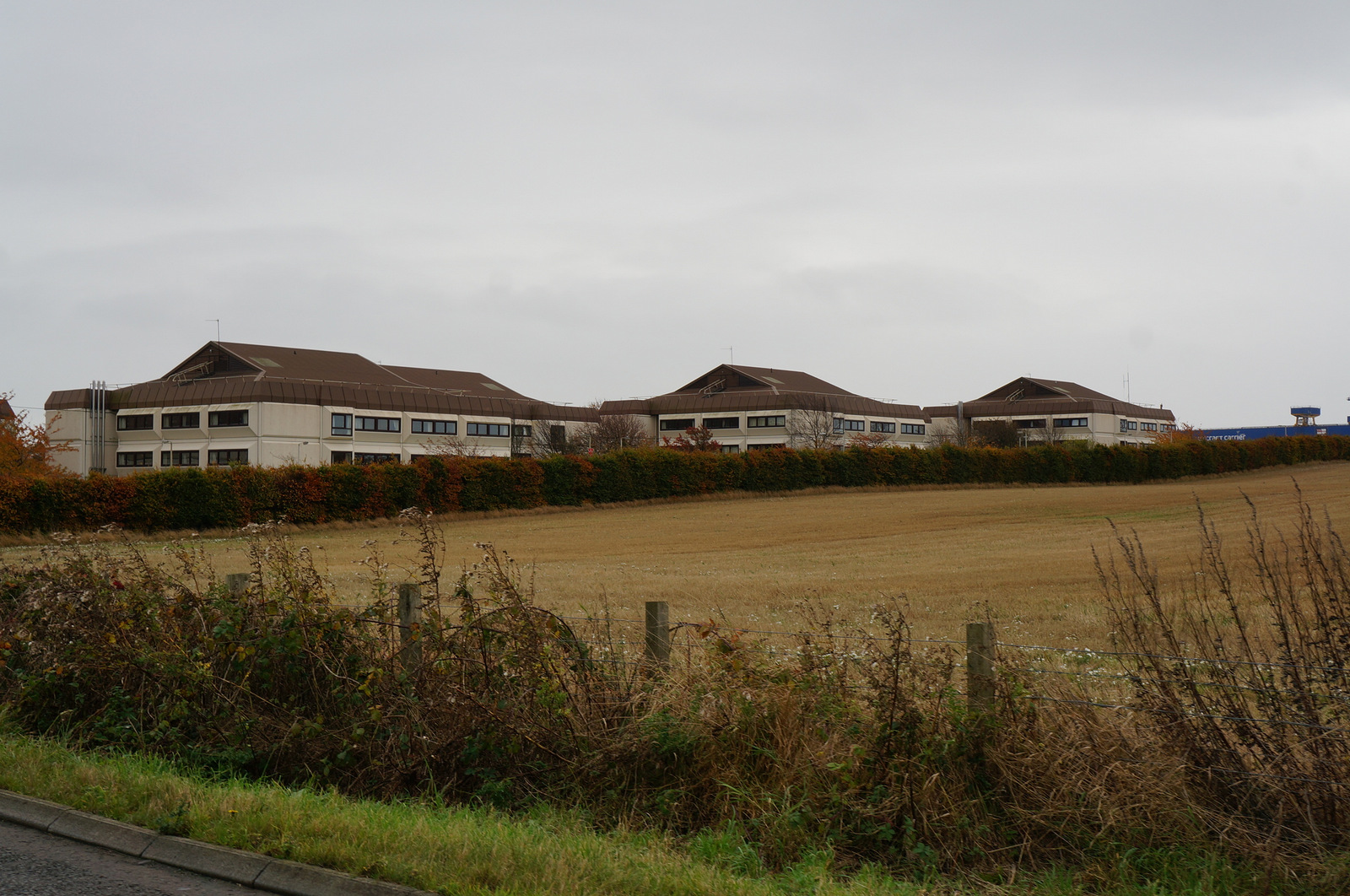
- HMS Caledonia

Site information
- Type: Military supply base
- Owner: Royal Navy
- Operator: Royal Navy
- Controlled by: Royal Navy
- Condition: Operational

Location
- Location within the Kingdom of Fife
- Coordinates: 56°1′56″N 3°26′54″W

Site history
- Built: 1937
- In use: 1937–present

His Majesty’s Ship Caledonia (HMS Caledonia) is a military establishment of the Royal Navy based next to the former Royal Naval Dockyard, Rosyth in Scotland.

== History ==
HMS Caledonia was first opened in 1937 and responsible for artificer apprentice training from 1937 to 1985, with many thousands of young men going through training. Following the consolidation of naval training in 1985, the site lost its training status with the former apprentice training moving to HMS Sultan in Gosport. The site was subsequently reduced to become part of HMS Cochrane.

Just before the beginning of the Second World War, Boys' Training Ship Caledonia was based here. By this time Admiral Sir Charles Ramsey, the Commander-in-Chief, Rosyth, responsible for naval operations in the area, was based at HMS Cochrane just down the road at the Dockyard.

In 1993 the Ministry of Defence announced plans to privatise Rosyth. Babcock International, who had bought out Thorn's share of the original Babcock Thorn consortium, was the only company to submit a bid and after protracted negotiations purchased the yard in January 1997. In 1996, following the decommissioning and privatisation of the Royal Naval Dockyard Rosyth, MoD Caledonia was opened on the site of the former dockyard.

Following the Options for Change review and the collapse of the Soviet Union, the reserve unit HMS Scotia was moved from Pitreavie Castle to HMS Caledonia, where it has been based ever since.

In 2018 concerns arose over the future of the site; it was reported that it could close in 2022, despite efforts to save it, this was later extended to 2026. On 1 April 2023 it was renamed HMS Caledonia and its future is assured.

== Based units ==
- Royal Navy
  - Headquarters, HMS Scotia
  - Royal Naval Support Establishment HMS Caledonia
  - Royal Navy Careers Headquarters (North)
  - Royal Naval Acquaint Centre (Northern)
  - Naval Regional Command Scotland and Northern Ireland (NRCSNI)
  - Directorate of Naval Shore Telecommunications (North)
- Royal Marines
  - Band of His Majesty's Royal Marines, Scotland
- Community Cadet Forces
  - TS Fife, Sea Cadet Corps
  - Sea Cadet Training Centre (National Sea Cadets Training Centre)
  - 1145 (Dunfermline) Squadron, Central Scotland Wing, Air Training Corps

== See also ==
- Armed forces in Scotland
- Military history of Scotland
