= Sports day =

Sports event staged by a school or workplace

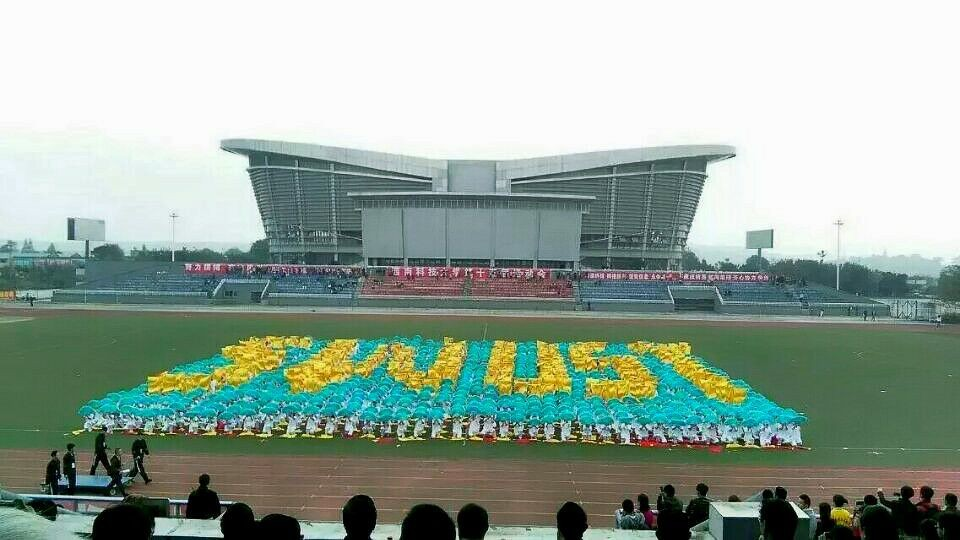
Southwest University of Science and Technology Sports Day opening ceremony

Sports Day (British English and Canadian English), field days (American English), or play days (Canadian English) are events staged by many schools and offices in which people participate in competitive sporting activities, often with the aim of winning trophies or prizes. Though they are often held at the beginning of summer, they are also staged in the autumn or spring seasons, especially in countries where the summer is very harsh. Schools stage many sports days in which children participate in the sporting events. It is usually held in elementary schools.

In schools which use a house system a feature of the school is the competition between the houses; this is especially brought out during sporting events such as an inter-house sports day.

Games that are played on school sports days can be wide and varied. They can include straightforward sprints and longer races for all age groups as well as egg and spoon races. Three-legged races are run as well as sack races, wheelbarrow races, and parent and child races. Long jumps and high jumps are also held. Additional games are traditionally run in Ireland, and the UK, such as horseshoes.

== Global ==
=== India ===
In India, sports days are held for 2–3 days. These include games like football, cricket, throw ball, dodge ball, volleyball, track and field, basketball etc. These sports days are held between the various houses in a particular school. In India, many traditional games such as kho-kho, kabaddi and march-past are played.

=== Japan ===
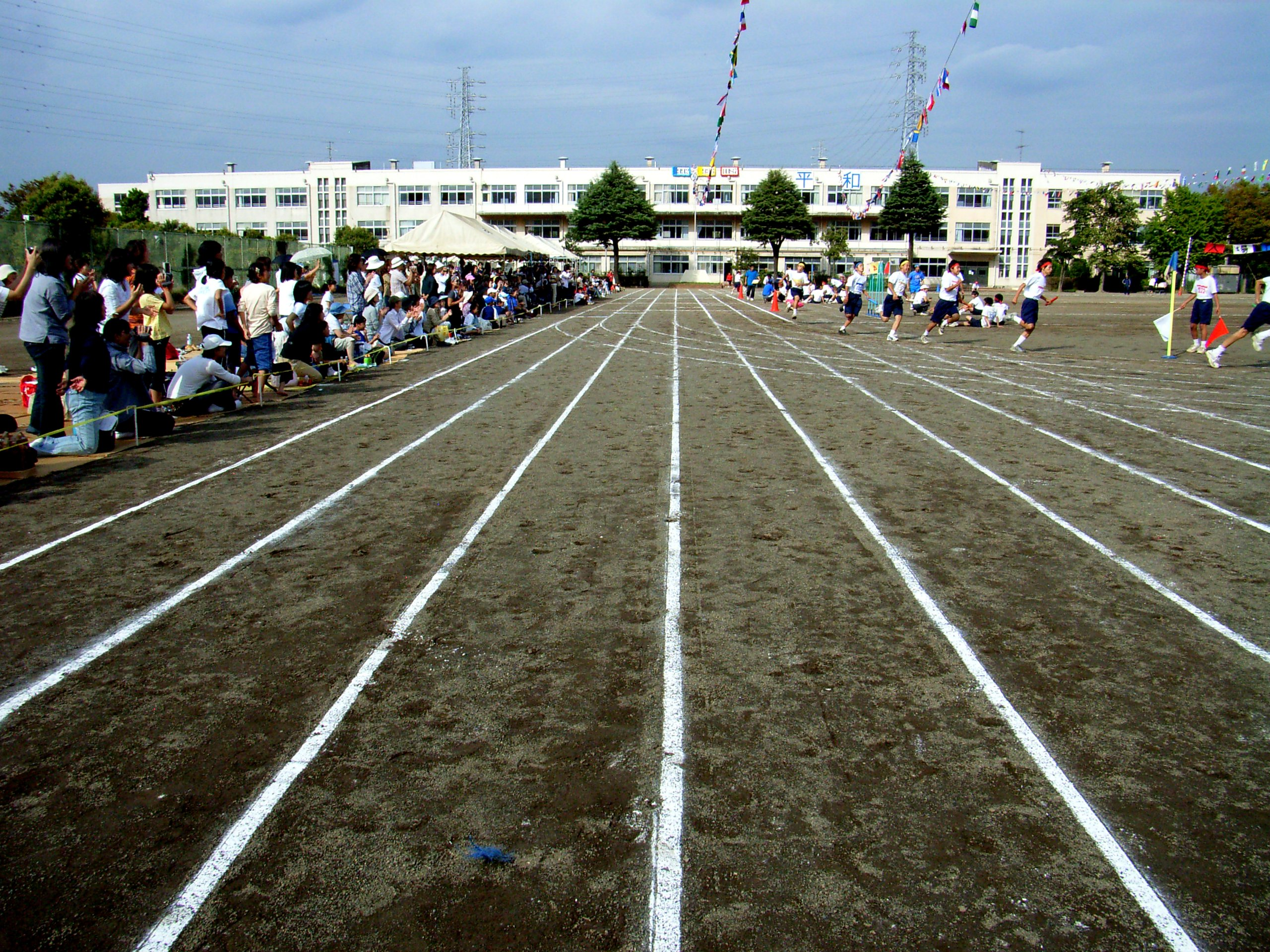
Undokai being held at a school in Kamakura, Kanagawa Prefecture, 2005

Sports day, called undōkai (運動会) in Japanese, is usually held on a Saturday or Sunday in Japanese schools. During weeks preceding the sports day, students practice their events which they would like to show their parents and friends, within their class of physical education, which often includes tamaire, performances by the school band and presentations by various school clubs as well as individual and group competitive events. These practices, and the sports days themselves, normally take place on the schools' fields, which provide little relief from the heat and sun.

Some schools have responded to rising average temperatures by scheduling their sports days during cooler months and by encouraging their students to drink water regularly. Currently, the event occurs most often in the autumn (September/October), or in the spring (May/June). In elementary schools in Hokkaidō, the event is usually held between the later part of May and the earlier part of June.

=== Pakistan ===
Sport is a significant part of Pakistani culture. Cricket is the most popular sport, while field hockey, polo, and squash are also popular. Many well funded private and government schools hold a Sports Day, when track and field events like running, relay races, high jump, long jump, discus and shot-put are held. These sports are generally played in front of an audience of parents who witness the Sports day events. If the children are divided by house in the school's system, then the various houses also compete against each other for enough points and medals to win that Sports day's events.

Traditional sports like kabaddi and other well-known games are also played. The Pakistan Sports Board was created in 1962 by the Ministry of Education as a corporate body for the purposes of promoting and developing uniform standards of competition in sports in Pakistan comparable to the standards prevailing internationally, and regulating and controlling sports in Pakistan on a national basis. The Ministry of Culture, Sports and Tourism, now has control over the Pakistan Sports Board. The PSB controls all 39 sporting federations. The Pakistan Sports Board is supported by the Pakistan Sports Trust, which assists hard up players and associations so they can continue participating in sports.

Over recent years there has been an increase in sporting activity in Pakistan, with Pakistani sportsmen and women participating at many national and international events. Also, more international tournaments now take place in Pakistan. The size of the teams Pakistan sends, and the number of events they participate in, such as the Olympic Games, Asian Games, World Games, and Commonwealth Games has increased since the turn of the century.

=== Russia ===
Sports Day in Russia is held on the second Saturday in August.

=== Qatar ===
Sports day is a national holiday, held every second-Tuesday of February every year. The Olympic Committee is tasked with organizing the large-scale nationwide activities that are held all over Qatar, and include a wide variety of sports such as; football, basketball, tennis, marathons, open walks, as well as regional sports such as camel riding. Other venues of sports day include Aspire Zone, Katara, The Pearl, among others. Sports day's popularity extends to the point that Sheikh Tamim bin Hamad Al-Thani, Qatar's Emir is casually seen participating in events.

== In offices ==
Many large organizations have sports days for their employees. One notable example is His Majesty's Civil Service in the UK, which holds a number of departmental sports days.

== Controversies ==
There have been a number of controversies surrounding school sports days since the late 20th century, many of which have been publicised by the media.

Some schools have abolished or heavily altered sports days on the grounds that they are too competitive and may damage pupils' self-esteem, with some commentators calling for the event to be banned due to the public humiliation caused to those children who are not gifted athletically. This view has been condemned as "political correctness" by many commentators, notably by journalist Melanie Phillips in her 1996 book All Must Have Prizes, a book heavily criticised by reviewers for its alleged prejudiced, fact-less and distorted analyses.
