= Billy Butlin =

Holiday camp entrepreneur

Sir Billy Butlin MBE
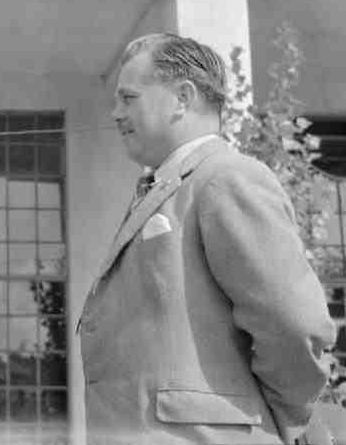
- Born: William Heygate Edmund Colborne Butlin; 29 September 1899; Cape Town, Cape Colony
- Died: 12 June 1980 (aged 80); Blair Adam House, Jersey
- Resting place: Saint John, Jersey; 49°14′45.9600″N 2°8′36.60″W
- Occupation: Entrepreneur
- Organisation: Butlins
- Known for: Holiday camps
- Spouse(s): Dorothy Cheriton (1925–1958); Norah Faith Cheriton (1958–1975); Sheila Devine (1975–1980)

Sir William Heygate Edmund Colborne Butlin MBE (29 September 1899 – 12 June 1980) was an entrepreneur known for British holiday camps. (Note: American Heritage Dictionary 2004, p. 135.) (Note: Scott 2001, p. 5.) Although holiday camps such as Warner's existed in one form or another before Butlin opened his first in 1936, it was Butlin who turned holiday camps into a multimillion-pound industry and an important aspect of British culture.

Born in Cape Town, South Africa, to William and Bertha Butlin, Butlin had a turbulent childhood. His parents separated before he was seven, and he moved to England with his mother. He spent the next five years following his grandmother's family fair around the country where his mother sold gingerbread, exposing the young Butlin to the skills of commerce and entertainment. When he was twelve his mother emigrated to Canada, leaving him in the care of his aunt for two years. Once settled in Toronto, his mother invited him to join her there.

In Canada, Butlin struggled to fit in at school and soon left for a job in a Toronto department store Eaton's. In World War I he enlisted as a bugler in the Canadian Army. After the war, Butlin returned to England, bringing only £5 with him. He is seen on the 1921 census as lodging with John and Louisa Maggs in Avonmouth, Bristol and is described as Amusement Caterer travelling on own account. Investing £4 of that money to hire a stall travelling with his uncle's fair, Butlin discovered that giving his customers a better chance to win brought more custom in, and he quickly became successful. One stall became several, including prominent locations such as Olympia in London, and Butlin soon purchased other fairground equipment and started his own travelling fair. He proved successful in this endeavour as well, and by 1927 he opened a static fairground in Skegness.

Over the next 10 years Butlin expanded his fairground empire, while harbouring an idea to increase the number of patrons in his Skegness site by providing accommodation. Butlin's first holiday camp opened at Skegness in 1936, followed by Clacton, two years later. Plans to open a third in Filey were cut short by the outbreak of World War II. Butlin used the war to his advantage, persuading the MoD to complete the Filey Holiday Camp and construct two more camps in Ayr and Pwllheli as training camps which he reclaimed when the war was over. In the post-war boom, Butlin opened four more camps at Mosney, Bognor Regis, Minehead and Barry Island as well as buying hotels in Blackpool, Saltdean, and Cliftonville.

Butlin's grave is in the grounds of Blair Adam house, Jersey.

== Early life ==
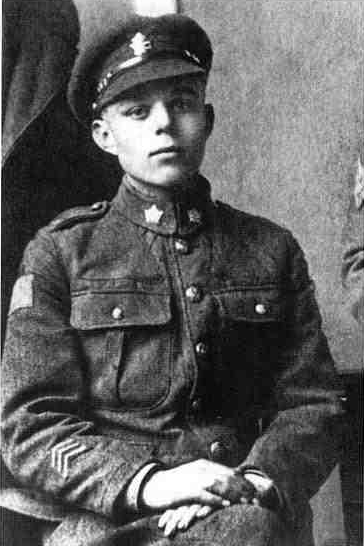
Butlin posing for a photograph some time after his enlistment in 1915.

William Heygate Edmund Colborne Butlin was born on 29 September 1899 in the Cape Colony (part of the modern-day Republic of South Africa). (Note: Reid, Douglas A. "Butlin, Sir William Heygate Edmund Colborne [Billy] (1899–1980), fairground proprietor and founder of holiday camps". Oxford Dictionary of National Biography (online ed.). Oxford University Press. doi:10.1093/ref:odnb/30887. (Subscription, Wikipedia Library access or UK public library membership required.)) His father, William Colborne Butlin, was the son of a clergyman; his mother, Bertha Cassandra Hill, was a member of a family of travelling showmen. They met at a young age when Bertha's parents were working a country fair that William attended. Their marriage was considered not socially acceptable in Leonard Stanley, Gloucestershire, where they lived, and they emigrated to South Africa. William founded a bicycle shop to support the family, and they had two children, Butlin and his brother Harry John (known as Binkie) Butlin. When the marriage failed, Butlin's mother returned to England with her children and rejoined her own family in Coaley, near Bristol. (Note: Dacre 1982, p. 36.) Within a short time, Harry contracted polio and died.

In his autobiography, Butlin recorded that his mother remarried and emigrated to Canada circa 1910. (Note: Dacre 1982, p. 39.) For two years, Butlin, and his cousin Jimmy Hill boarded with a widow in Bristol. (Note: Dacre 1982, p. 39.) (This may not be correct as the 1911 Census of England shows that he and his mother were residing with her sister-in-law in Organs Yard, Regents Road, Bedminster, Somerset, England.) In December 1913, his mother returned to England and married Charles Robotham in Swindon.

Butlin's mother and stepfather then asked him to join them in Toronto. He accepted their offer, but was unhappy at school in Canada. He was mocked because of his English accent, and he left school at age 14. Eventually, he worked as a messenger at Eaton's, Toronto's largest department store. One aspect of working for the company was that he was able to visit their summer camp, which gave him his first taste of a real holiday. Later, he transferred to Eaton's advertising department where he drew black and white adverts, whilst studying at night school. (Note: Dacre 1982, p. 43.)

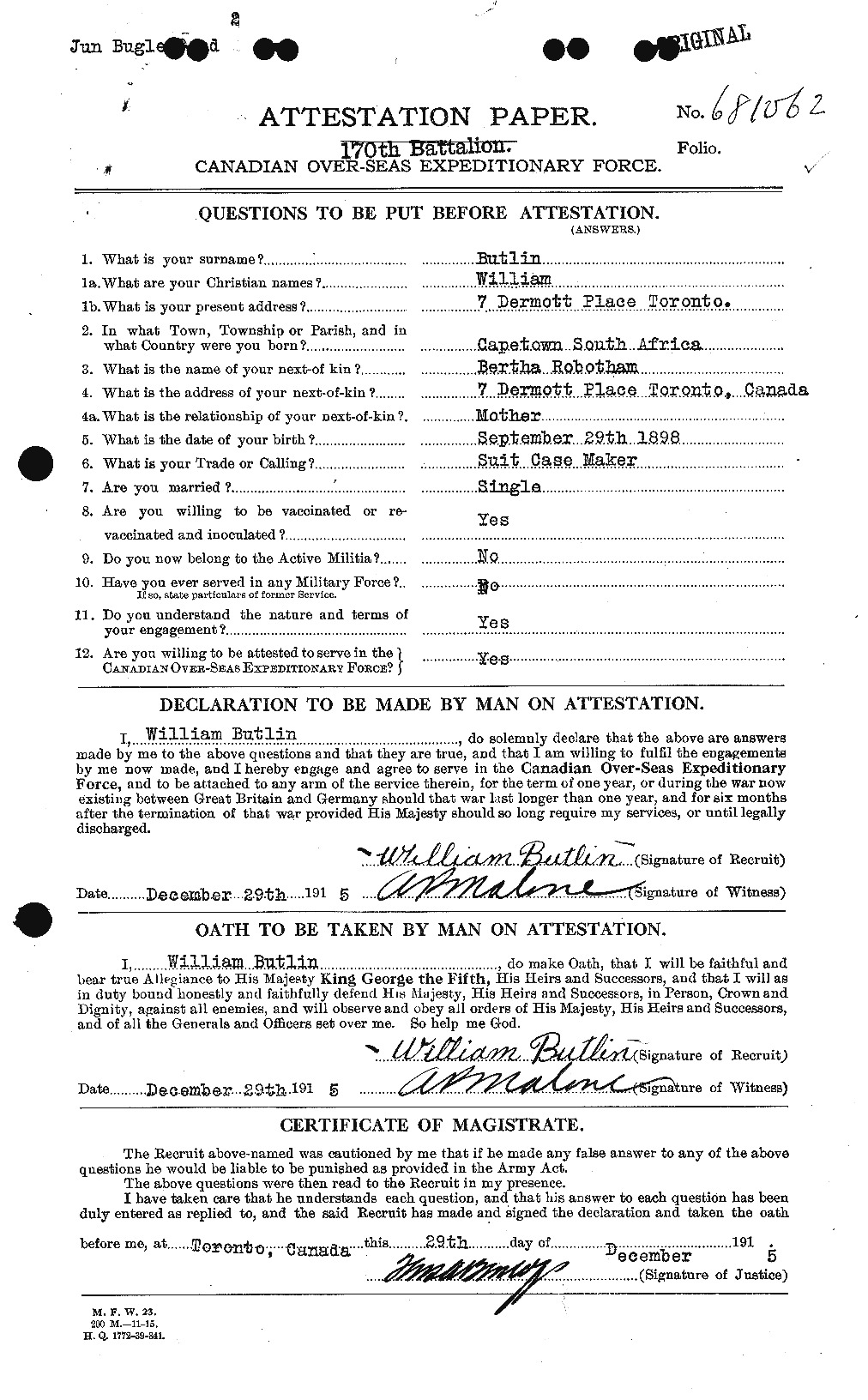
Butlin's attestation paper from World War I

In 1915, during World War I, Butlin volunteered for service in the Canadian Army. Knowing that the army already had a full quota of despatch riders, Butlin intended to volunteer for service in that category in the knowledge that although his application would be declined he would still receive an "I volunteered" badge for his actions without having to serve. While applying, Butlin forgot to tell the recruiter of this intention, and was consequently allocated to the Canadian Expeditionary Force which was involved in the fighting along the Western Front. (Note: Dacre 1982, pp. 43–45.) He was subsequently posted to the 170th (Mississauga Horse) Battalion on 29 December 1915. His attestation papers give his date of birth as 1898 (rather than the actual 1899), allowing him to enlist at age 15. The papers give his occupation as a "Suit Case Maker". The papers also show, as Butlin himself later stated, that he had been selected to serve as a bugler.

Before his deployment to Europe, Butlin transferred to the 216th (Bantams) Battalion, and he was sent to England. (Note: Allinson 1981, p. 180.) Once in England, he was stationed at Sandgate near Folkestone before being deployed to France. In France, the 216th became part of the 3rd Canadian Division which took part in the second battle of Vimy Ridge, as well the battles at Ypres and Arras, and the second battle of Cambrai; while in France, Butlin served as a stretcher bearer. (Note: Scott 2001, p. 6.)

After the war, Butlin returned to England aboard a cattle ship, arriving in England with only £5 (£250.31 as of 2026) capital. He travelled to Bridgwater, Somerset where his uncle, Marshall Hill, was a showman. He purchased a hoopla stall from Hill, and ran it successfully. In later interviews, Butlin claimed that he accidentally sawed the corners off his hoopla blocks, but some observers such as The Sunday Herald report that he did it intentionally, displaying "logic and business sense". In either case, Butlin's actions allowed patrons to have a much higher success rate (approximately 3 in 5 for each ring) (Note: Dacre 1982, p. 72.) and brought him more custom than fellow stall holders. By contrast, an average game would have odds of approximately 1 in 9 for each ring or 1 in 3 for a 3-ring game.

Butlin's stall gave him less profit per customer than his competitors, but the increase in business gave him a bigger overall profit than theirs. He moved to London and set up a successful stall outside the Christmas circus ran by Bertram Mills at Olympia. By the end of the season, Butlin was so successful that he brought his widowed mother to the UK from Canada.

== Start of Butlin's empire ==
=== Funfair and amusement parks ===
Over the next few years Butlin toured the country with the Hills Travelling Fair, leaving his mother to run the Olympia site. Soon he had his own travelling fair visiting country fairs such as Barnstaple. Butlin opened some permanently-sited stalls in 1925, in Barry Island, Wales. (Note: Scott 2001, p. 6.) In 1927 he leased land from the Earl of Scarbrough in the seaside town of Skegness. Here he established an amusement park with hoopla stalls, a tower slide, a haunted house, and a scenic railway. In 1928, Butlin secured an exclusive licence to sell dodgem cars in Europe. The first dodgems in Britain were available in his park at Skegness. Other showmen bought dodgems from Butlin. His activities in Skegness continued to expand, and by 1930 included a zoo featuring lions, zebras and an imitation African village. (Note: Scott 2001, p. 24.)

Butlin opened a similar fairground in 1932, in Bognor Regis, on the corner of the Esplanade, named the Recreation Shelter. In 1933 he opened a zoo nearby, which featured polar bears, kangaroos and monkeys. Around the same time he opened an amusement park in Bognor's neighbouring village of Littlehampton, known as Butlin's Park.

In the 1930s Butlin had amusement parks in Mablethorpe (opened 1928), Hayling Island (1931), Felixstowe (1931), Southsea (1931) and on the Isle of Man. He continued to operate his winter fair at Olympia and soon added the winter fairs at Waverley Hall in Edinburgh and at the Kelvin Hall in Glasgow. By 1935 most of his existing parks had zoos attached to them, providing another source of revenue.

Butlin's funfair and amusement park business expanded in the post-war period. In 1938 he gained the sole contract to supply amusements to the Empire Exhibition in Glasgow and after the war, he continued to open amusement parks such as the one at Sheerness. (Note: Scott 2001, p. 20.) (Note: Scott 2001, p. 29.)

=== First holiday camps ===
Butlin had nurtured the idea of a holiday camp. He had seen the way landladies in seaside resorts would, sometimes literally, push families out of the lodgings between meals, regardless of the weather. Butlin toyed with the idea of providing holiday accommodation that encouraged holiday-makers to stay on the site and provided entertainment for them between meals.

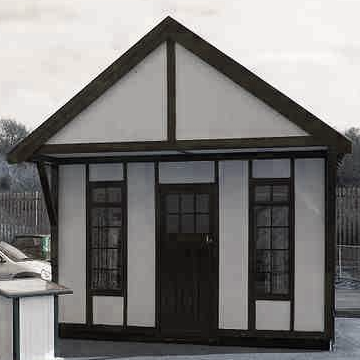
One of Butlin's original chalets at Skegness, now preserved and a listed building

He opened his first Butlin's camp at Ingoldmells, near Skegness, on 11 April 1936 (which coincided with Easter eve). It was officially opened by Amy Johnson, the first woman to fly solo from England to Australia. An advertisement costing £500 (£31,132.13 in 2026) was placed in the Daily Express, announced the opening of the camp, inviting the public to book for a week's holiday. The advertisement offered holidays with three meals a day and free entertainment with a week's full board cost anything from 35 shillings to £3 (£112.08 to £186.79 in 2026), according to the time of year. When the camp opened, Butlin realised that his guests were not engaging with activities in the way he had planned. Most kept to themselves, and others looked bored. He asked Norman Bradford (who was engaged as an engineer constructing the camp) to take on the duty of entertaining the guests, which he did with a series of icebreakers and jokes. By the end of the night the camp was buzzing and the Butlin's atmosphere was born. After that, entertainment was the heart of Butlins, and Bradford became the first of Butlin's Redcoats. That night Butlin decided that for his camp to be successful he would need many more on the same job as Bradford, and the role of Redcoat was conceived.

In his autobiography, Butlin refers to Clacton as his second camp; (Note: Dacre 1982, p. 122.) In 1937, architect Harold Ridley Hooper, who had drawn the plans for the camp at Skegness, created plans on behalf of Butlin's Ltd., for a second camp at Dovercourt, in Essex. In the winter of 1938, the camp at Dovercourt was requisitioned by the government for housing children evacuated from Germany by the Kindertransport programme. Writers and speakers discussing that programme, such as Anthony Grenville and Ela Kaczmarska, claim that the camp had been constructed by Butlin and operated as a Butlin's camp for the 1937–1938 season, Kaczmarska also suggests that it had closed in the summer of 1938, the same time the Clacton camp opened. Recollections of the refugees suggest that by December 1938 the camp was being run by Harry Warner, whose company Butlin was on the board of. (Note: Butler, Russell 2010, p. 38.) At around the same time Butlin's advertised Dovercourt as "associated with Butlin's" and into the early 1940s Butlin was putting on rail packages with the London and North Eastern Railway (LNER) to the Dovercourt camp.

Butlin proposed a new holiday camp at Clacton-on-Sea in Essex in 1936. Both the council and the local association of hotels opposed the idea, as did boarding house keepers. To persuade them, Butlin took the members of the council to Skegness to see how people there appreciated their holiday camp. The councillors were soon won over when they learnt that the local traders in Skegness had seen an initial dip in custom after its construction followed by a rise as campers had visited the town and seasonal workers had come to spend their pay. Once approved by the council, construction began and the camp opened in 1938. (Note: Dacre 1982, p. 122.)

On 30 January 1937, Butlin turned his business into a limited company "Butlin's Ltd.". Butlin took the decision to form the company as a means to raise finance for his new camps. On 8 February 1937 the company published its prospectus ahead of a public sale of shares. When the shares became available, they sold out entirely in five minutes. (Note: Dacre 1982, p. 119.)

== World War II years ==
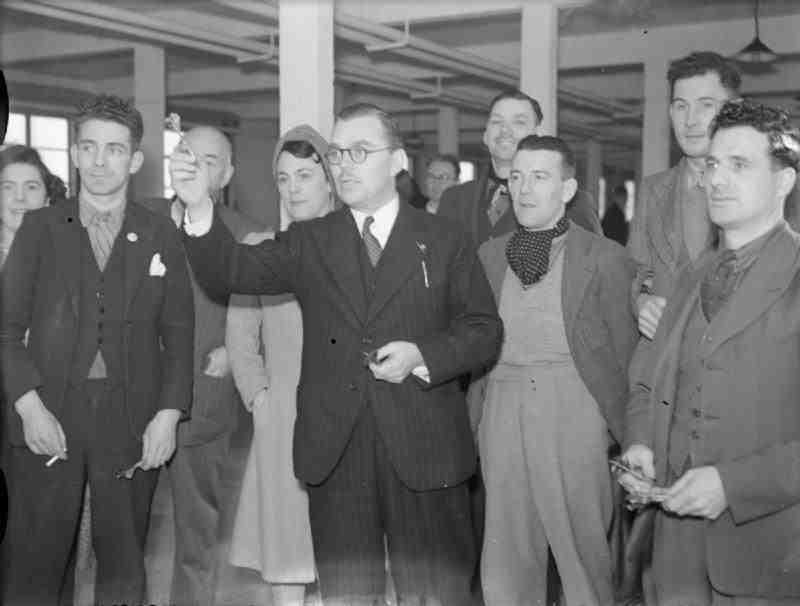
Butlin visiting a munitions factory on behalf of the Ministry of Supply

With the outbreak of WWII, the Clacton and Skegness camps were requisitioned by the War Office for use as training camps. The ministry needed further camps, and contracted Butlin to build them. Butlin agreed, on the condition that he could purchase the sites after the war for use as holiday camps. The ministry agreed, and Filey, Pwllheli and Ayr were constructed, reopening as holiday camps after the war (Filey in 1946, Pwllheli & Ayr in 1947). As Butlin was dealing with other sites, he asked his business competitor, Harry Warner, to complete the construction of Filey. (Note: Dacre 1982, p. 131.) Butlin had purchased his first hotel in 1939, the Thatched Barn in Borehamwood, Hertfordshire. Like his camps, it was requisitioned (this time by the Special Operations Executive (SOE)) before he could develop it.

During the war years, a number of Butlin's camps were used as Royal Navy shore establishments. Skegness became HMS Royal Arthur, a training establishment for petty officers. Pwllheli became HMS Glendower, and Ayr became HMS Scotia. Filey became RAF Hunmanby Moor and Clacton, after being considered for use as a prisoner of war camp, was later used as a training site for the Pioneer Corps. (Note: Dacre 1982, p. 133.)

Butlin was recruited by the Ministry of Supply and asked to look at the causes of low morale amongst the workers in Britain's munitions factories. His first stop was at the Royal Ordnance Factory, Chorley, where he found that the camouflaged huts and barbed wire fences used to house workers gave them the feeling of being interned. Using his experience in establishing holiday camps, Butlin devised activities and systems to boost morale, which led to his appointment as Director General of Hostels. (Note: Rowbotham 1997, p. 237.) (Note: Scott 2001, p. 7.)

In this position, Butlin introduced games and entertainment similar to those used in his holiday camps. These included: whist drives, amateur dramatics, theatrical productions and cinema. In 1943, he encouraged workers to continue taking their holiday entitlement but to do so at home, arranging various travelling fairs to visit towns on their "holiday week". (Note: Barton 2005, p. 184.)

Butlin's appointment to this role gave cause for concern in some quarters, with questions being asked of the under-secretary, Harold Macmillan, about the nature of his involvement. The appointment was a voluntary one with no salary or expenses and was made after the consideration of other suitable candidates.

Late in the war, during the Allied advance through western Europe following the Normandy landings, Butlin was approached by General Bernard Montgomery, who asked him to help set up leave centres for the 21st Army Group. Starting in Brussels, the "21 Club" concept quickly spread through western Europe, providing entertainment and relaxation for servicemen and women. (Note: Dacre 1982, pp. 148–149.)

In 1944, Butlin was awarded the MBE for his wartime service to the Ministry of Supply. (Note: Coren 1979, pp. 36–37.)

== Post-war expansion ==
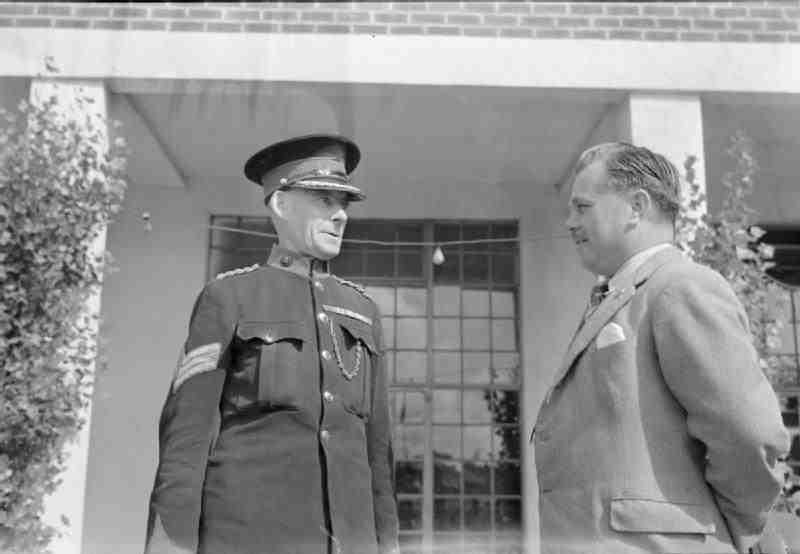
Billy Butlin, and Sergeant John Caffrey, VC, one of the Commissionaires at Filey Holiday Camp

After the war, it became apparent that most holiday camps in Britain had been damaged by troop occupation, and the situation was so bad that questions were raised in parliament. (Note: Cormack 1998, p. 96.) Other than Clacton, the Butlins camps were relatively unscathed, and even Clacton, which had been damaged by troop occupation, re-opened in early 1946. In the post-war boom, Butlin saw opportunities on foreign shores. He opened camps at Mosney, in the soon-to-be Republic of Ireland in 1948 and on Grand Bahama in 1949.

In most ways Mosney was identical to the existing successful camps, but in Ireland this was something that was seen to be feared, rather than embraced. A number of complaints appeared in the Catholic Standard, warning that holiday camps were an English idea that were undesirable in Catholic Ireland. Like the other camps, Mosney was designed to have a church and reassurances were given that it would be a Catholic chapel with a resident priest. Reassurances were also given that Irish nationals would have priority over British tourists in booking holidays. In July 1948 the camp was opened by William Norton, the Minister for Social Welfare, and it operated successfully as a Butlin's camp until the early 1980s.

A more ambitious plan by Butlin was conceived on a trip to The Bahamas in 1946. Seeing potential for a camp in warmer climes, he formed a company under the chairmanship of Sir Bede Edmund Hugh Clifford and bought land in Grand Bahama. Butlin also purchased the Princess Hotel in Bermuda and the Fort Montagu Beach Hotel in Nassau. The camp was intended to be complete and open on New Years Day of 1950. After an investment of US$5 million (£50,677,266.27 in 2026) the camp opened, still only partially complete, in the winter of 1949. To celebrate its opening, Butlin ran a mystery flight, where guests, who had paid $129 (£1,308.43 in 2026) each, were taken on a flight to the resort without being informed in advance. Butlin did not celebrate for long; he required a further $2.25 million (£25,338,633.13 in 2026) to complete the camp, and American tourists unaccustomed to the holiday camp concept had little interest. In an attempt to save the camp, Butlin sold the hotel leases to an American firm. By November 1950, the subsidiary company handling the Caribbean resort was ordered to be wound up by a court. Butlin admitted defeat and focused his efforts back into Europe. In the late 1940s, Butlin successfully opened hotels outside the Skegness and Ayr camps, and soon expanded following this, acquiring hotels in Saltdean, Blackpool and Cliftonville. (Note: Cormack 1998, p. 96.)

== Further camps ==
In the 1960s, Butlin created a series of new camps at Bognor Regis (opened 1960), Minehead (opened 1962) and Barry Island (opened 1966). (Note: Dacre 1982, pp. 203–206.) The Barry Island resort remained under the Butlin's franchise until its closure in 1986 and subsequent sale to Majestic Holidays, while Bognor and Minehead remain part of the company today.

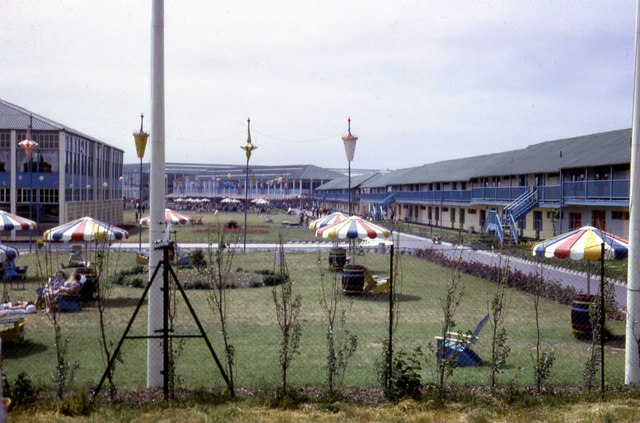
Butlins Bognor Resort in 1962

On July 2 1960, Butlin planned to open his holiday camp at Bognor, but because of flooding it was not ready. Butlin offered his patrons the chance to be re-sited at Clacton or to stay and help complete the camp's construction. A number opted to stay and help, and received a free bottle of champagne as a reward. Once opened, the camp quickly became popular, accommodating around 5,000 campers and another 5,000 day visitors.

In the winter of 1961, Butlin began work on his camp in Minehead. The site opened to the public on 26 May 1962 having cost £2 million to construct. Over the next decade several attractions were added to the site. A miniature railway was added in 1964, chairlifts in 1965, and a monorail in 1967.

Butlin's inspiration for his holiday empire had come from a holiday to Barry Island in his twenties, when he had been locked out of his B&B all day by his landlady. (Note: Dacre 1982, pp. 30–31.) He finally decided to build the last and smallest of the camps there in 1965. Butlin took out a 99-year lease on the headland at Nell's Point, Barry Island, in 1966. Construction began in the winter and it opened to campers on 18 June 1966. Butlin retired in 1969 and the Barry Island camp was the last camp opened under his management.

== Later life ==
Growing up, Butlin had lived with his aunt Jessie in the Swan Pub in Coaley. (Note: Dacre 1982, p. 287.) In his later life he was able to purchase desirable property for himself, for many years living on The Bishops Avenue. His house there was Dane Court in Hampstead, which he purchased in 1947. (Note: Kynaston 2007, p. 218.) Also in 1947 he sat on the board of directors of Belle Vue Stadium. Butlin sold Dane Court in 1951, and moved to a property in Grosvenor Square. He remained in this property through the 1950s and 1960s. (Note: Time and Tide Publishing Co. 1964, pp. 192–193.)

Butlin retired in 1969, handing over company operations to his son Bobby. A hostile takeover bid by Phonographic Equipment in November 1969 caused him to come out of retirement, in the capacity of "consultant". With his father's help Bobby fended off the takeover, and Butlin returned to retirement. In 1972, the Rank Organisation launched a friendly takeover for £43 million (2025: £509 million), which both Butlin and his son agreed to accept. (Note: Dacre 1982, p. 91.)

Butlin's retirement was forced by circumstance. His accountant informed Butlin that the total rate of income tax and surtax that Butlin was due to pay for the coming year was 115% of his income. (Note: Dacre 1982, p. 258.) Butlin elected to move from London, becoming a permanent resident in Blair Adam House, Saint John, on the island of Jersey, in the Channel Islands. This move was financially beneficial since Jersey had a fixed 20% rate of income tax. He remained a resident of Jersey until his death on 12 June 1980, aged 80. He is buried in the parish of St John and his grave is shaped to represent a double bed. (Note: Pearson 2008, p. 124.)

Butlin actively engaged in charity work through the Grand Order of Water Rats and through the Variety Club of Great Britain. He was Chief Barker of the Variety Club in 1959, 1966 and 1975. In 1963, he set up the Bill Butlin charitable trust, and in 1966 donated £100,000 (2025: £1.63 million) to set up a trust to help in cases where police officers were incapacitated or fatally injured while on duty. With public support the fund grew firstly to £250,000 and eventually to over £1 million. In return he received many honours, from having a hybrid tea rose name after him, to his knighthood in 1964. In being knighted, Butlin was following in the footsteps of his great uncle Sir Henry Trentham Butlin, an eminent surgeon. In 1960, Butlin was awarded the Carl Alan award for his services to dance.

== Personal life ==
Butlin remained close to his mother, both in following her to Canada and in arranging for her to come home after the death of his stepfather. She died in 1934 and never saw his first holiday camp. (Note: Dacre 1982, p. 100.) By contrast, Butlin makes no mention in his biography of his father after returning from Canada. His father remained in Cape Town for the rest of his life, dying in 1954.

In the 1920s while staying in Tiverton in Devon, and working with Marshall Hill, Butlin met Doris "Dolly" Mabel Cheriton, whose family owned the local fish and chip shop; the couple were married in 1927. By the early 1930s the marriage had failed and they separated. Soon after, Butlin met and fell in love with Norah Faith Cheriton, Dolly's niece. Dolly refused to grant Butlin a divorce. It was not until Dolly's death in 1958 that he and Norah were free to marry. Butlin was surprised by Eamonn Andrews for This Is Your Life on his wedding day in 1959. The second marriage lasted only a few months, as Butlin had already fallen in love with Sheila Edwina Devine. This time it was Norah who refused to grant him a divorce. In 1975, with divorce laws having changed, Butlin was able to divorce Norah and marry Sheila with whom he remained until his death. (Note: Scott 2001, pp. 6–8.)

Butlin had two sons and four daughters from his three marriages. Bertha Hill's obituary records "William, Dolly and baby Shirley" and on Shirley's fifth birthday, the local Skegness newspaper noted that she invited many of her friends to her father's holiday camp for her party. Little reference is made to her after this time, and her name is not listed on her father's grave with her still-living siblings. Sandra died in 1976 at the age of 34 (the same year Butlin's second wife Norah died.) William Jr. died of cancer in 2003. Robert took over from his father, running the company from 1968 to 1984, and died of lung cancer on 31 December 2008. Jacquie lives on Jersey, where she runs a clothes shop. (Note: Herbert, Christine (13 January 2009). "Credit Crunch Chic". Jersey Evening Post.) Jacquie's daughter, Laura Emily, was the subject of a court case in the Cayman Islands in 1992, to establish whether she could be a beneficiary of her grandfather's estate. Cherie is an actress.

== Media references ==
Butlin is listed as a member of the eclectic (and fictional) "orchestra" in the Bonzo Dog Doo-Dah Band's recording, "The Intro and the Outro", where he is credited with playing the spoons. (Note: Chapple, Mike (3 November 2006). "Preview: Bonzo Dog Doo-Dah Band, Philharmonic Hall". Liverpool Daily Post.) Butlin features as himself in the book Billy Bunter at Butlins by Frank Richards (first published 1961). Bunter, Wharton and company head off to Skegness for a holiday at the camp at Butlin's invitation.

== Bibliography ==
- Allinson, Sidney (1981). The Bantams: The Untold Story of World War I. Howard Baker. ISBN 978-0-88962-190-9.
- The Riverside Dictionary of Biography. American Heritage Dictionary. 2004. ISBN 0-618-49337-9.
- Barton, Susan (2005). Working-class Organisations and Popular Tourism, 1840–1970. Manchester University Press. ISBN 0-7190-6590-9.
- Butler, Richard; Russell, Roslyn A. (2010). Giants of Tourism. CABI. ISBN 978-1-84593-652-5.
- Coren, Alan (1979). Pick of Punch. Hutchison. ISBN 0-09-139490-2.
- Cormack, Bill (1998). A History of Holidays, 1812–1990. Antony rowe Ltd. ISBN 0-415-19316-8.
- Dacre, Peter (1982). The Billy Butlin Story. Robson Books. ISBN 0-86051-864-7.
- Kynaston, David (2007). Austerity Britain, 1945–1951. Bloomsbury. ISBN 978-0-7475-7985-4.
- Pearson, Lynn F. (2008). Discovering Famous Graves. Osprey Publishing Co. ISBN 978-0-7478-0619-6.
- Rowbotham, Sheila (1997). A Century of Women:The History of Women in Britain and the United States. Viking. ISBN 0-670-87420-5.
- Scott, Peter (February 2001). A History of the Butlin's Railways. Peter Scott. ISBN 1-902368-09-6.
- Time & Tide Business World. Vol. 45. Time and Tide Publishing Co. 1964.
