= Wheelbarrow race =

Race game with teams of two players

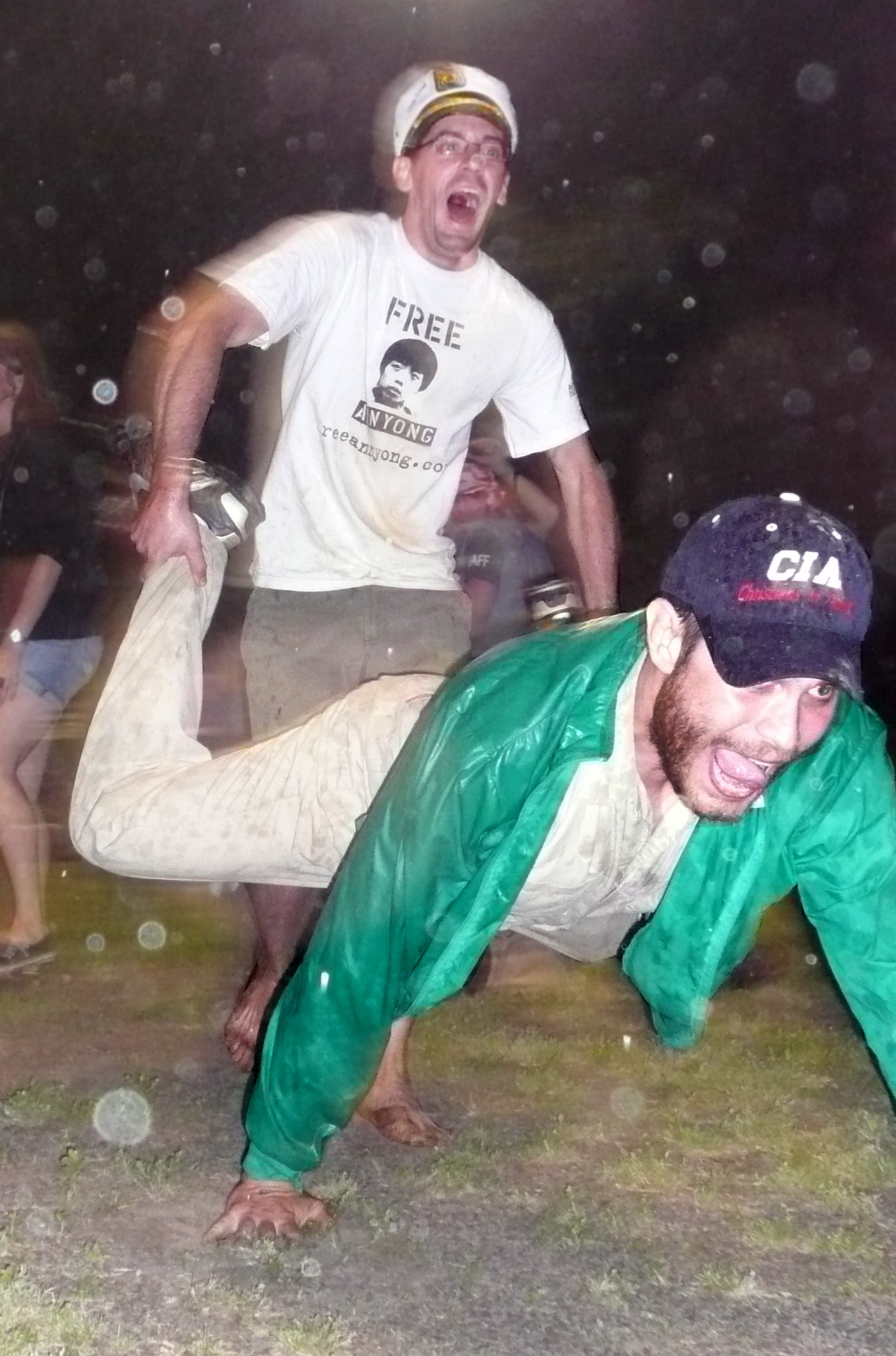
Wheelbarrow racers in 2007

A wheelbarrow race is a competitive game in which teams of two players race with one teammate playing the role of the driver, and the other playing the role of the wheelbarrow. The driver holds on to the other player's ankles, while the other player walks with their hands.

Alcoholic beverages may be involved.

== See also ==
- Sack race
- Three-legged race
- Wheelbarrow Olympics
