= Sack race =

Race in which participants have their legs in a sack

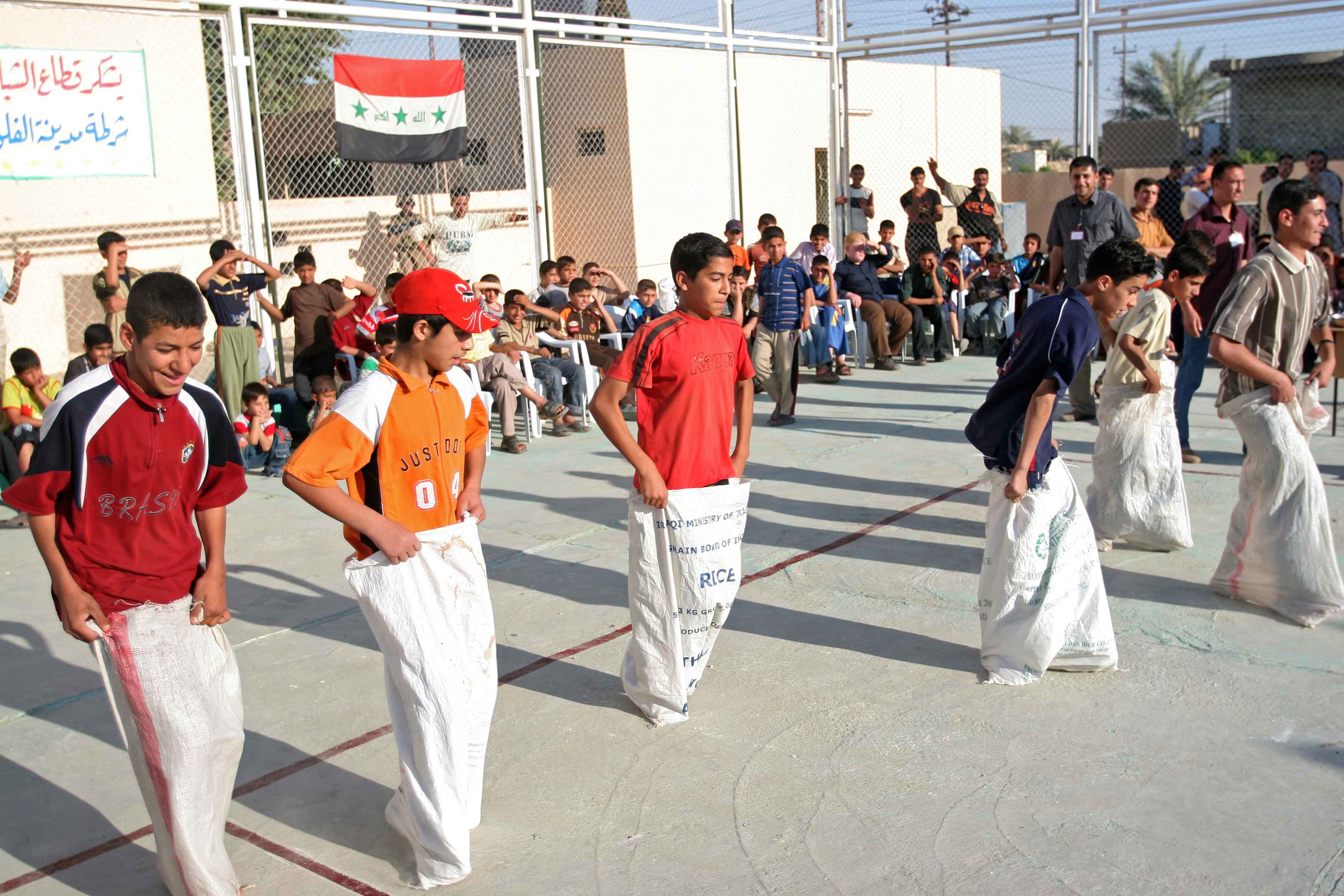
A group of children in Fallujah, Iraq, participating in a sack race

Video of a potato sack race in Wendell, Massachusetts

A sack race is a competitive game in which participants place both of their legs inside a sack (usually a potato sack) or pillow case that reaches their waist or neck and hop forward from a starting point toward a finish line. The first person to cross the finish line is the winner of the race.

Possible rule changes that people make to the traditional game include using extra large sacks and running inside the sack; however, in some cases such technique may be viewed as cheating.

Sack racing is traditionally seen as an activity for children, but people of any age can compete. In schools, the sack race often takes place on a sports day, along with numerous other events such as the egg and spoon race. It is also a frequent pastime at fairs, birthday parties, and picnics.

== Records ==
The fastest 100 metres sack race time is 25.96 seconds and was achieved by Christian Roberto López Rodríguez in Yuncos, Spain, on 18 November 2020. He also holds the world record for the 200 metres sack race: he completed the distance in a time of 63.88 seconds on 3 January 2021.

The fastest 4×100 metres sack race time is 2 minutes and 29.09 seconds and was achieved by Andrew Rodaughan, Patrick Holcombe, James Osbourne and Luke McFarlane in Beveridge, Australia, on 17 June 2003.

The fastest 1 mile sack race is 16 minutes 41 seconds and was achieved in Baruun Salaa in Mongolia by Ashrita Furman on 19 May 2007. He also holds the record for fastest 10 km sack race, finishing in 1 hour 22 minutes and 2 seconds, achieved in Montauk, USA on 23 April 2001

The record for largest sack race competition, with 2095 competitors, is held by Agnieten College in Zwolle, Netherlands and was won on 11 October 2002.

=== Fastest 100m sack race—Official Guinness World Records ===
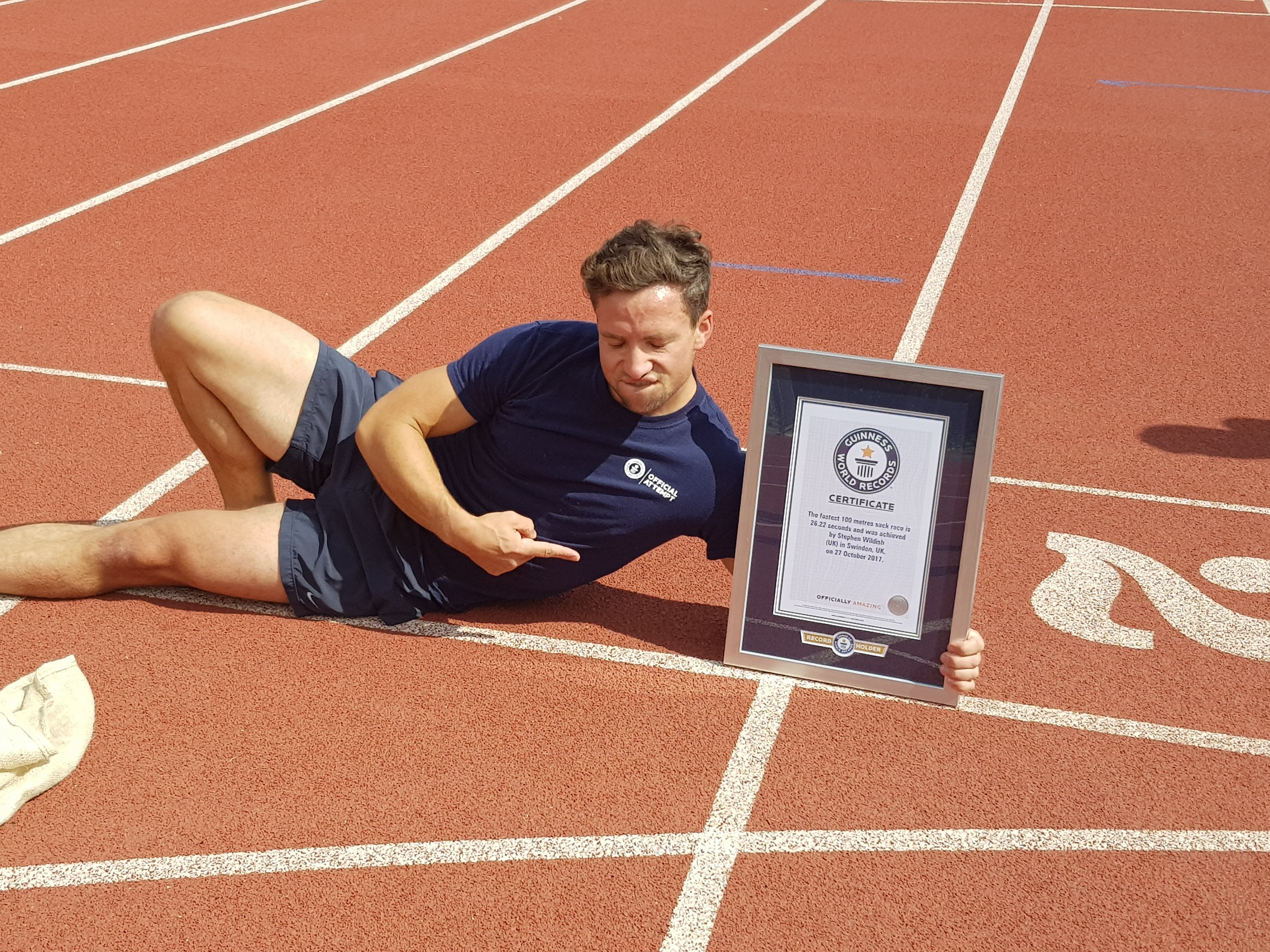
Stephen Wildish with his 100m sack race world record

Order	Time (s)	Athlete	Nation	Date	Location	Ref
1	25.96	Christian Roberto López Rodríguez	Spain	18 Nov 2020	Yuncos, Spain	
2	26.22	Stephen Wildish	United Kingdom	30 Oct 2017	Swindon, UK	
3	39.91	Mo Farah	United Kingdom	14 July 2014	London, UK	

=== Fastest 200m sack race—Official Guinness World Records ===
Order	Time (s)	Athlete	Nation	Date	Location	Ref
1	63.88	Christian Roberto López Rodríguez	Spain	3 June 2021	Yuncos, Spain	
2	64.00	Stephen Wildish	United Kingdom	17 August 2018	Swindon, UK	

=== Fastest 400m sack race—Unofficial World Records ===
Order	Time (s)	Athlete	Nation	Date	Location	Ref
1	174.00	Stephen Wildish	United Kingdom	17 August 2018	Swindon, UK	
