= Egg-and-spoon race =

Sporting event

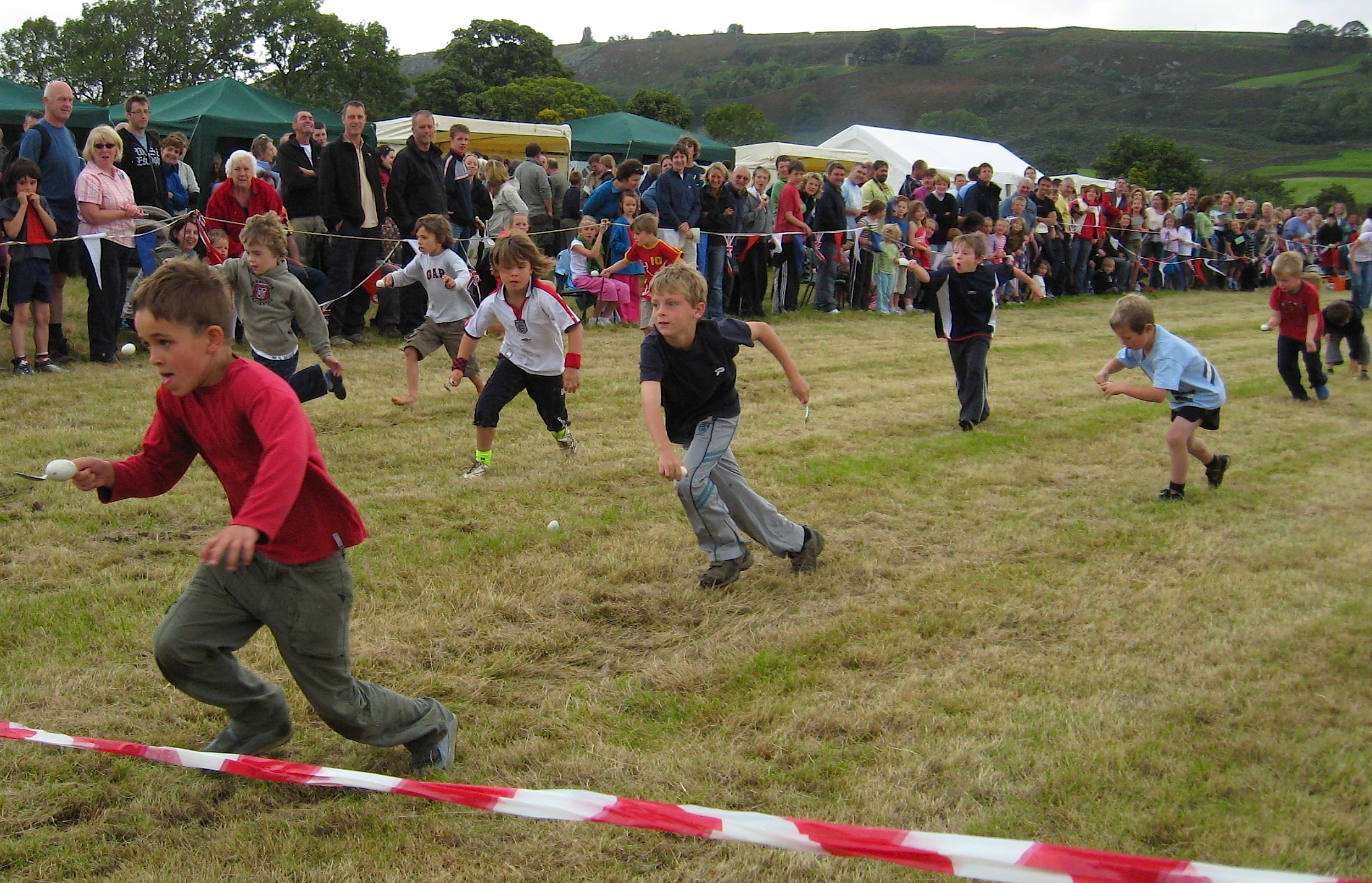
Children participating in a typical egg-and-spoon race

An egg-and-spoon race is a sporting event in which participants must balance an egg or similarly shaped item upon a spoon and race with it to the finishing line. At many primary schools an egg-and-spoon race is staged as part of the annual Sports Day, alongside other events such as the sack race and the three-legged race.

== History ==
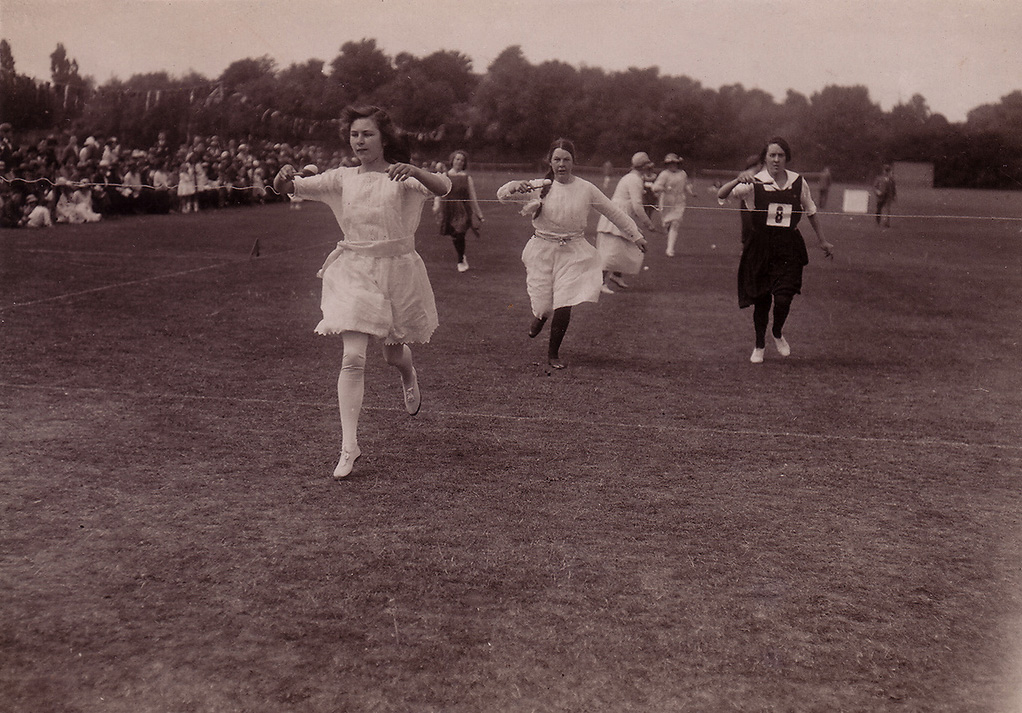
Parents' race, c.1920; vintage postcard by Barratt's Photo Press of Fleet Street

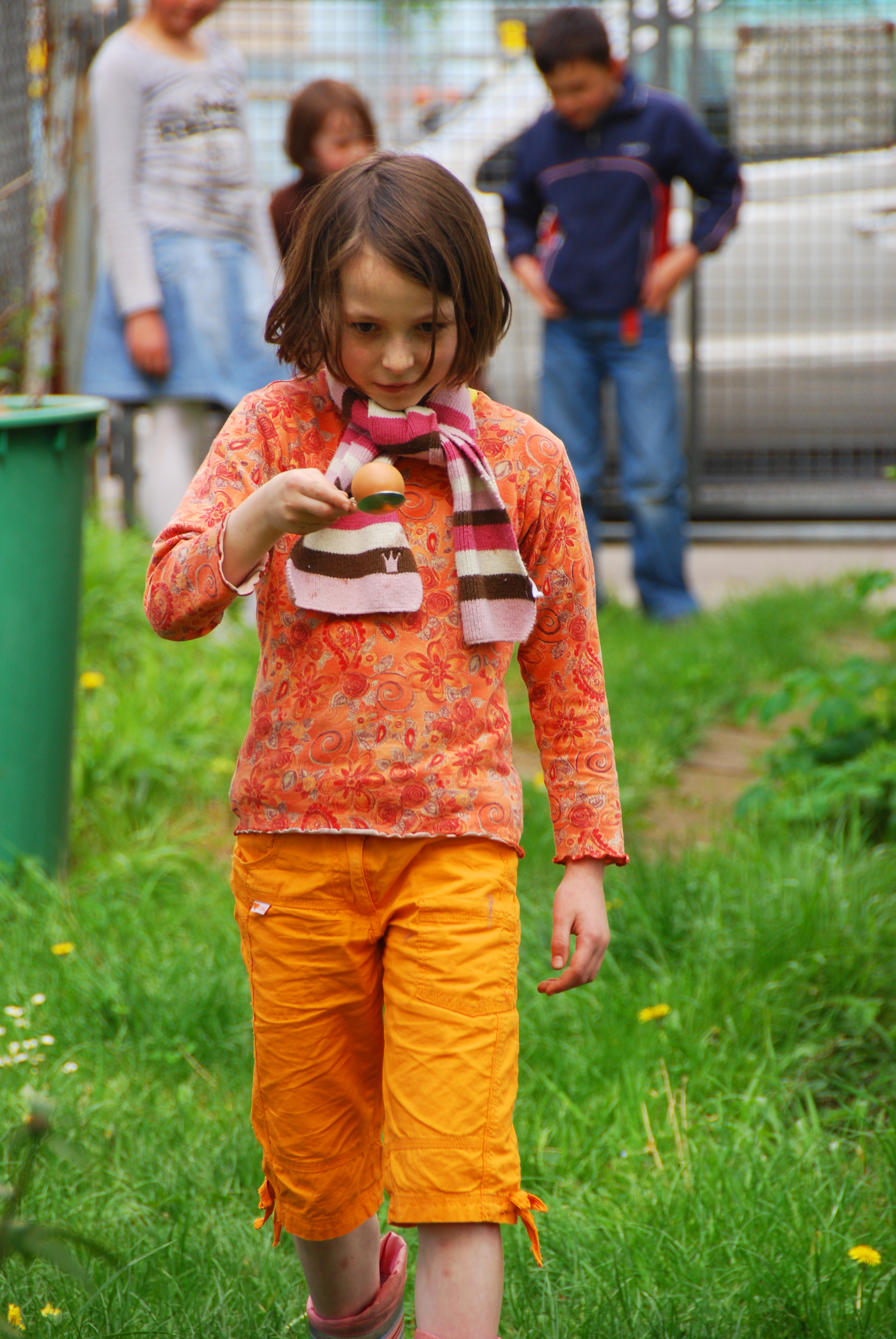
As in Aesop's fable The Tortoise and the Hare, "slow and steady wins the race"

The earliest recorded usage in the Oxford English Dictionary is in an article of 8 September 1894 featured in The Daily News: "the gentlemen had a turn in the egg-and-spoon race, in which the competitors had to punt with one hand and balance an egg on a spoon with the other". Egg-and-spoon races formed part of village celebrations of the Diamond Jubilee of Queen Victoria in 1897, alongside the tug of war and blindfold wheelbarrow races. A set of turned and stained wooden eggs and spoons designed for racing and dating to the 1920s forms part of the Good Time Gallery of the Museum of Childhood in the Victoria and Albert Museum, London. The egg-and-spoon race reached Canada by at least 1922, the first time it was mentioned in The Globe. By the 1930s, the phenomenon of the parents' egg-and-spoon race was sufficiently well established to be satirised in Punch. Races were held among the staff of Trinity College, Cambridge, until the 1950s.

== Rules ==
Competitors race either individually or in teams in the manner of a relay race. If the egg falls from the spoon, competitors may be required to stop, retrieve, and reposition their egg; or to start again; or may even be disqualified. Due to the lesser penalty imposed for dropping the egg, and consequent encouragement of greater risk-taking, the first penalty scenario may result in a race that is faster overall. Common methods of cheating include sticking the egg to the spoon, or holding onto the egg with one finger. For an extra challenge, contestants might carry the spoon with both hands, with their teeth, or have their hands tied behind their backs.

== Prohibition ==
In some schools, the use of raw eggs is banned on the grounds of health and safety and fears of allergy or of competitors contracting salmonella through accidental ingestion of the contents of a broken egg. Punitive insurance premiums have also resulted in the cancellation of some events. The phrase "egg and spoon" features in The Concise New Partridge Dictionary of Slang and Unconventional English; its use, along with the idiom good egg with which it is sometimes confused, is frowned upon by the Metropolitan Police on the grounds of it being derogatory and rhyming slang for "coon".

== Records ==
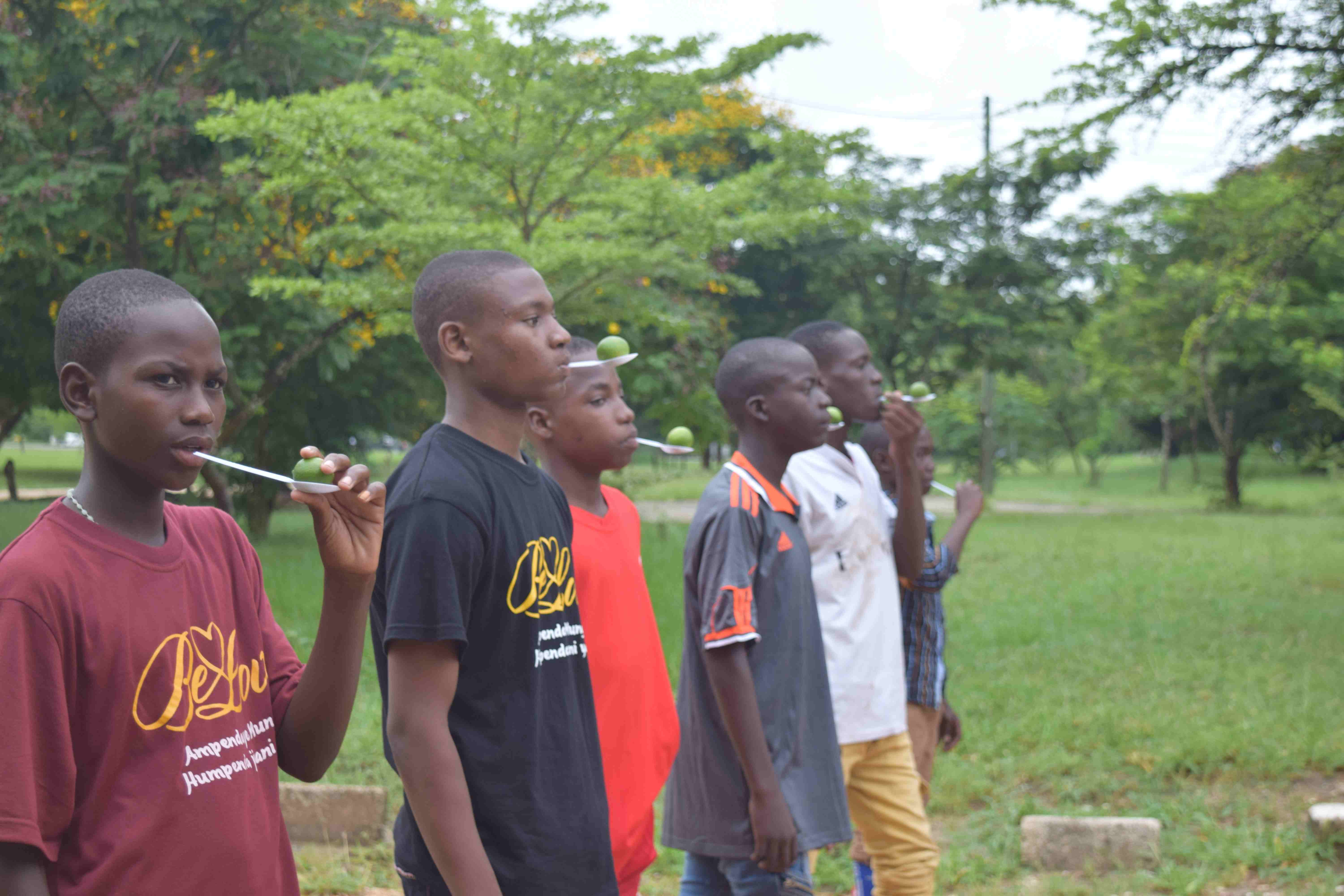
The race can also be staged with competitors holding their spoons in their mouths

A number of world records in egg-and-spoon racing are held by New Yorker and serial record-holder Ashrita Furman; these include, as published by Guinness World Records, fastest 100 metre egg-and-spoon race (now 16.59 seconds by Australian Sally Pearson, set in 2013 in Sydney); fastest 100 metre egg-and-spoon race while holding the spoon in the mouth (25.13 seconds); fastest mile egg-and-spoon race (7 minutes, 8 seconds); fastest mile egg-and-spoon race holding the spoon with both hands (8 minutes, 5 seconds); and fastest mile egg-and-spoon race holding the spoon in the mouth (9 minutes, 29 seconds). In 1990 a runner completed the London Marathon in three hours and forty-seven minutes while carrying a dessert spoon with an uncooked egg balanced upon it. In July 2023, members of St Ewe Free Range Eggs attempted a world record for the greatest distance to carry an egg in one week.

British Olympic heptathlete and gold‑medal winner Denise Lewis cites victory aged six in a thirty‑metre egg-and-spoon race as the origin of her sporting ambitions; she advises all young athletes: "concentrate, have fun with it and do your best".

== See also ==
- Egg dance
- Humpty Dumpty
- Amateur sports
