= Three-legged race =

Running event

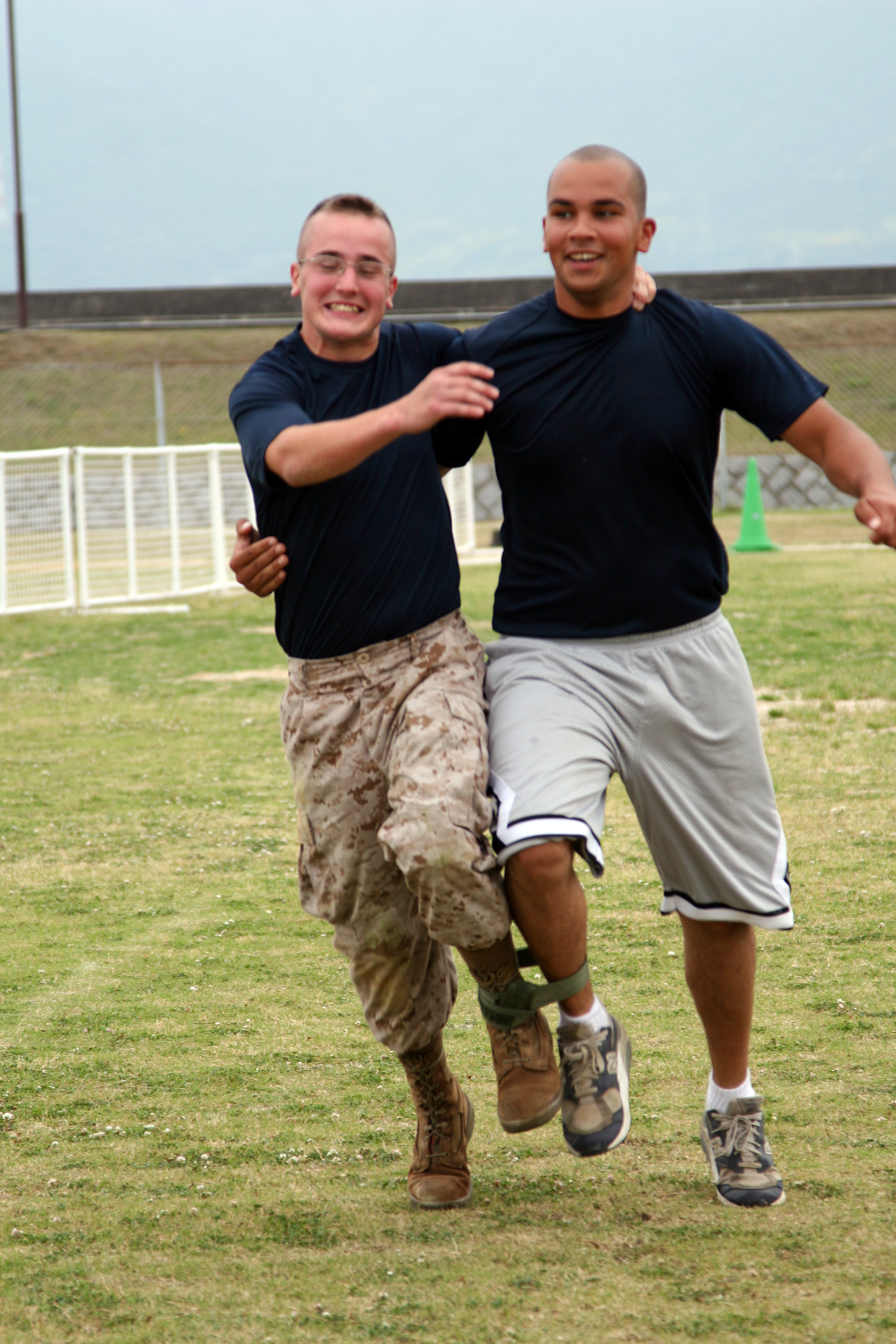
Three-legged race

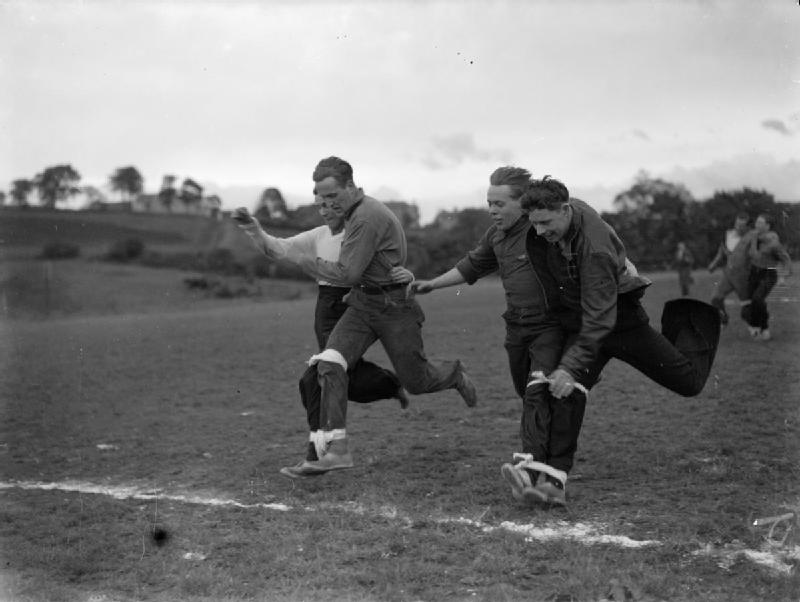
The Royal Navy during World War II

A three-legged race is an informal running event involving pairs of participants running with the left leg of one runner strapped to the right leg of another runner. The objective is for the partners to beat the other contestant pairs to the finish line.

Three-legged races are traditionally staged in schools as a sports day activity.

== Records ==
The longest distance ever run three-legged in 24 hours is 117.1km (72.7 miles) and was achieved by Gary Shaughnessy (Tadley, England) and Andy Tucker (Tadley, England), at Silchester on 9/10 October 2021. Gary Shaughnessy and Andy Tucker also broke the 12 hour record on the same day.

The world record for the most pairs in a three-legged race is 768, set by Caritas of Hong Kong in 2019. An August 2014 attempt in Canberra organised by National Rugby League team Canberra Raiders failed; only 543 pairs competed.
