= Metropole Hotel (Blackpool, England) =

Hotel in England

- Pictured in 2026

- Location within Blackpool
- Former names: Bailey's (Baylie's) Hotel; Higher Royal Hotel; Rossall's Dickson Hotel

General information
- Location: Blackpool, Lancashire, England
- Coordinates: 53.820750°N 3.055485°W
- Construction started: 1776 (250 years ago)
- Opened: 14 June 1785
- Closed: September 2021
- Owner: Britannia Hotels

Other information
- Number of rooms: 223

Website
- www.britanniahotels.com/hotels/blackpool/

The Metropole Hotel is a large historic hotel in Blackpool, England. It is the only hotel on the shoreline side of Blackpool Promenade. It is one of the two oldest hotels in Blackpool; work originally began in 1776, on what was then named Bailey's Hotel, and it opened in 1785. It is owned by Britannia Hotels. It closed in 2021.

== History ==
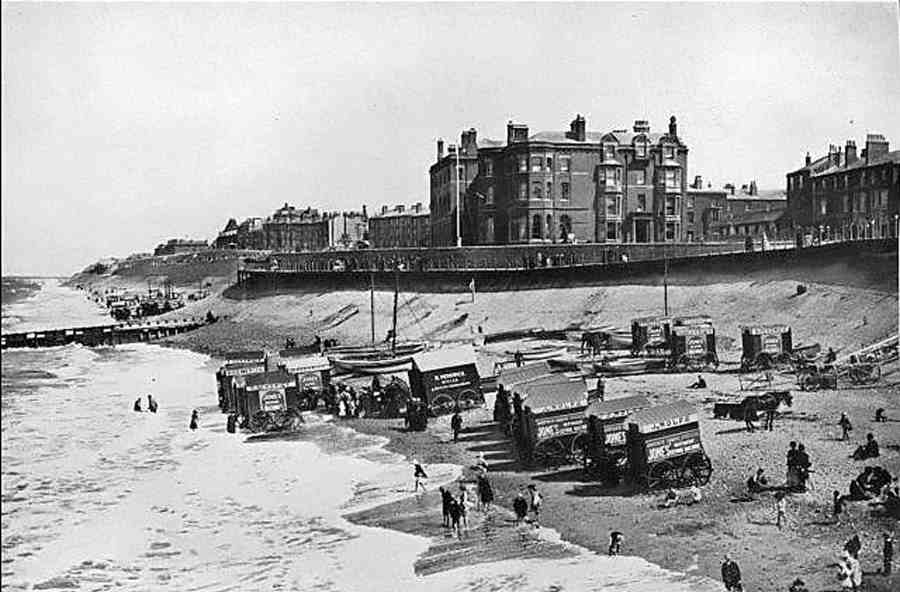
Bailey's Hotel in 1890

In 1776, Lawrence Bailey, a farmer from the Layton area of Blackpool, began work on a hotel by the shore. Construction was completed in 1785 and, on 14 June, Bailey began advertising his hotel in the Manchester Mercury newspaper.

The hotel opened with 34 bedrooms, three dining rooms, and a coffee lounge. At the time it was one of only four hotels in the fledgling resort. Of those only two remain: Bailey's (or Baylie's) Hotel, which became the Metropole, and Forshaw's, which became the Clifton Arms and is currently run as a Travelodge. The other two hotels, Hudson's and Hull's Tavern, were later converted into department stores and remain in retail use today.

In 1826, the hotel was purchased by Robert Dickson and was renamed the Higher Royal Hotel. In 1852 it was taken over by Robert Rossall, who renamed it Rossall's Dickson Hotel, then by 1867 reverted to the name Bailey's.

In 1856, Blackpool's first promenade along the beach was created; this ran from the hotel to the Houndshill area, and was constructed of asphalt. In 1870 this was upgraded with a cobbled granite sea-wall on top of which Blackpool Promenade sat. The hotel was now in an enviable position, as all other hotels were on the landward side of the promenade whilst Bailey's sat on the shore. In 1885 when the trams arrived, they followed the line of the promenade on the landward side of the hotel; on 12 March of that year the first section of track was laid directly outside the hotel.

The hotel underwent renovations in 1873, with an additional wing to the East, and again in 1876 with the construction of shops on the landward side. In 1900 the building underwent further substantial renovation resulting in its expansion to twice its previous size and taking on the Victorian appearance it retains to this day.

In 1875, the town's first council meeting took place in the hotel.

In 1896, the hotel was purchased by JT Murray and was renamed "Hotel Metropole", the name it still retains. In 1900 it was sold to Spiers and Pond Limited. In 1939 the government requisitioned the hotel as part of the war effort. After the war, in 1947, The Metropole Hotel (Blackpool) Limited Company was formed, when F Price purchased it back from them.

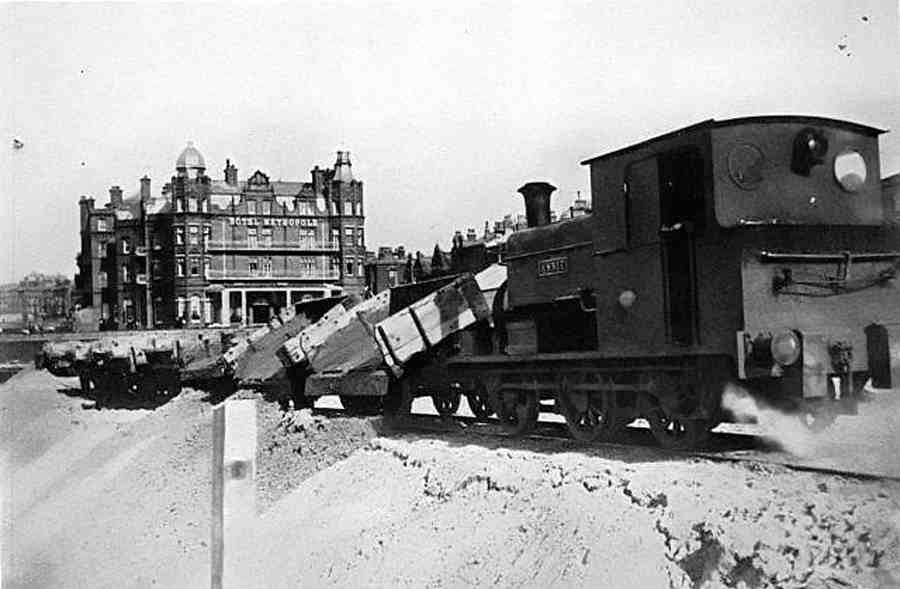
Hotel Metropole in 1911

In 1955, Billy Butlin purchased the hotel for his Butlins holiday chain. In 1998, Butlins sold their hotels to Grand Hotels and the name changed to "Grand Metropole Blackpool". In 2004, Grand Hotels sold the Grand Metropole Hotel to Britannia Hotels along with other former Butlins Hotels such as the Grand Hotel in Scarborough and the Grand Hotel in Llandudno.

As of 2018 the hotel had 223 bedrooms, two restaurants, and a café.

In September 2021, the hotel closed to guests when the UK government rented it to house asylum seekers. In July 2026, it was handed back to its owners, Britannia Hotels. The hotel has not reopened to guests, as it requires extensive renovations.
