= The Grand Burstin Hotel =

Hotel located in Folkestone

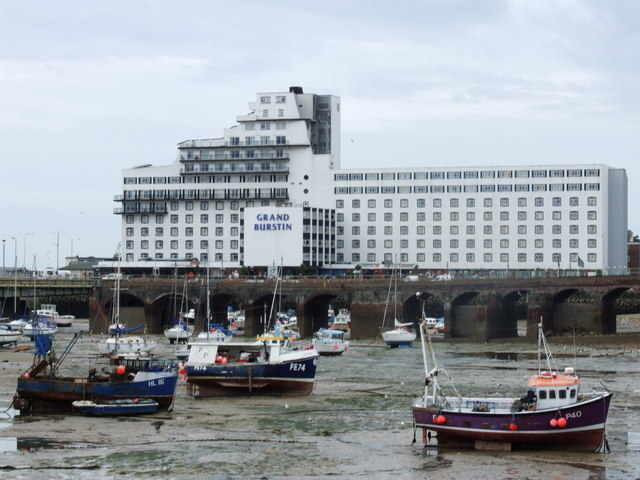
- View of the Grand Burstin hotel from the harbour
- Interactive map of the The Grand Burstin Hotel area

General information
- Location: The Harbour, Marine Parade, Folkestone, United Kingdom
- Coordinates: 51°4′43″N 1°11′7″E
- Opening: 1975; 51 years ago 1845; 181 years ago (as Pavilion Hotel)
- Owner: Britannia Hotels Ltd
- Operator: Britannia Hotels

Technical details
- Floor count: 14

Design and construction
- Architects: A. T. Bacon; Sir William Cubitt

Other information
- Number of rooms: 550
- Parking: 120

Website
- The Grand Burstin Hotel Folkestone

The Grand Burstin Hotel is located at Folkestone Harbour in the seaside town of Folkestone, England. The hotel was almost completely rebuilt in the 1970s after the new owner, Motyl Burstin, (Note: Publications spell Burstin's first name as "Motyl", whilst newspapers from the period spell his first name as "Motel".) purchased the site of the previous Royal Pavilion Hotel in 1955.

Dating to the mid-nineteenth century, the Royal Pavilion Hotel designed by Sir William Cubitt was built on the site of an older hotel of the same name, opening to the public in 1845. The establishment was visited by historic figures such as Charles Dickens and received its "Royal" title after a rumoured visitation from Queen Victoria during 1855. After being taken over by the Royal Navy during World War II for use as HMS Allenby, Royal Pavilion fell into disrepair and in 1955 was purchased by a new owner. Building of the Grand Burstin, then known as Hotel Burstin, occurred throughout the 1970s, with it opening to the public in 1975. Demolition of the Royal Pavilion concluded in 1982, with the Burstin then extended, leaving the south wing and back entrance of the Royal Pavilion to be connected to the new building.

Since the Britannia Hotels takeover in 2004, the hotel has received widespread criticism for poor standards relating to health and safety, maintenance, cleanliness and use as an emergency shelter for migrants. The building has been used as a filming location for both the 2022 Disney+ miniseries Pistol and the 2023 film Who Is Erin Carter?

On the morning of 19 September 2026, the hotel was seriously damaged by a fire, suspected of being arson.

== Site ==
The Grand Burstin Hotel was located at Marine Parade in the seaside town of Folkestone. The building sat on the site of the previous Royal Pavilion Hotel, which was established in the 1840s. The hotel and land were purchased in the 1950s by Polish tycoon Mr. Motyl Burstin. The Grand Burstin Hotel underwent construction in 1974 and opened as Hotel Burstin in 1975 sitting on land facing the harbour. The building was approximately 200 feet high and was 14 stories tall. After falling into disrepair by 1979, plans were made to demolish the Royal Pavilion. (Note: South Kent Gazette 22 August 1979 Local News. Accessed: 3 October 2025) It was subsequently demolished between 1981 and 1982, though the south wing and back entrance remained. Planning application drawings display the Grand Burstin hotel as having a front elevation of approximately 11 metres (36 ft) facing toward Harbour Approach Road.

== Royal Pavilion Hotel history ==
=== 1808 to 1855: Early years ===
==== Early interior and amenities ====
Origins of the site date back as early as 1808, where a shipbuilder's hut is described as having stood. Later, by 1843, the launch of a packet boat service to Boulogne, France, at the then named Pavilion Tavern, led to an increase in travel trade on the route which included the site. In 1844, Pavilion Hotel, designed by Sir William Cubitt, was built on the grounds of the recently demolished building of the same name. The initial new building developments consisted of a billiard room, coffee room, a ballroom, club room, a table d'hôte, and a large front balcony with six-foot-wide York slabs, supported by ornamental iron brackets. Publicly accessible rooms were large and decorated, with apartments and dormitories being in close proximity to one another for ease of access. During 1853, Charles Dickens visited the hotel and wrote about the architecture and experience of the Royal Pavilion Hotel, referring to it with the alias "Pavilionstone". Dickens later published these writings as a eulogium in the 12th volume of Household Words, with the title "Out of Town", in 1855, written in honour of the hotel manager, Mr. Beach, who cared for him during an illness. This was used as an advertisement for the hotel.

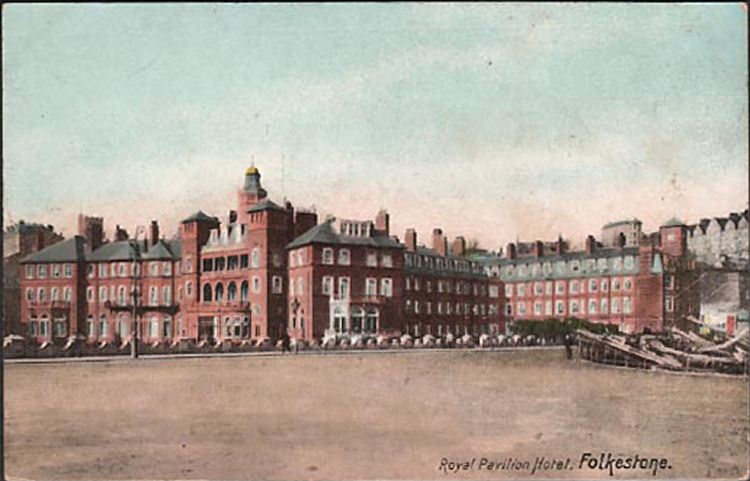
Postcard image of Pavilion Hotel from 1850.

The early building was described as having spacious rooms that were appropriately decorated with "handsome" saloons. Access to the saloon, which was used for private functions, required payment of one shilling (equivalent to £14 in 2025), with free access provided to families who engaged a sitting room. The table d'hôte was popular, especially during the summer months, with affordable prices it was considered economical. Breakfast was served at the table d'hôte until ten o'clock in the morning, with a table d'hôte dinner served in the afternoon at two o'clock at the cost of four shillings (equivalent to £56 in 2025) per person. Visitors with private sitting rooms were able to use or obtain the public arrangements and luxuries without limitations. The Pavilion Hotel implemented a measure whereby printed bills were placed in every room so as not to create an imposition between staff and guest. The aforementioned billiard room, and a reading room, described as being "well-stocked" with material, provided adequate indoor entertainment. The front of the hotel featured a lawn for leisure, which at the time would have provided views of the working harbour and boats crossing the channel.

==== Winter gardens and swimming pool ====
The Royal Pavilion Hotel sometimes advertised their winter garden, located at the back of the building and included a swimming pool, in local newspapers. The winter gardens were advertised as being open for promenading at the cost of one shilling (equivalent to £14 in 2025) and half-price (equivalent to £7 in 2025) for children. The winter gardens functioned as a large open greenhouse for a large number of plants including palms, ferns and eucalypti, which could be viewed by guests. The gardens also had a large ballroom, with stage and orchestra accompaniment. In the 1920s, the Folkestone Swimming Club used the swimming pool located in the winter gardens.

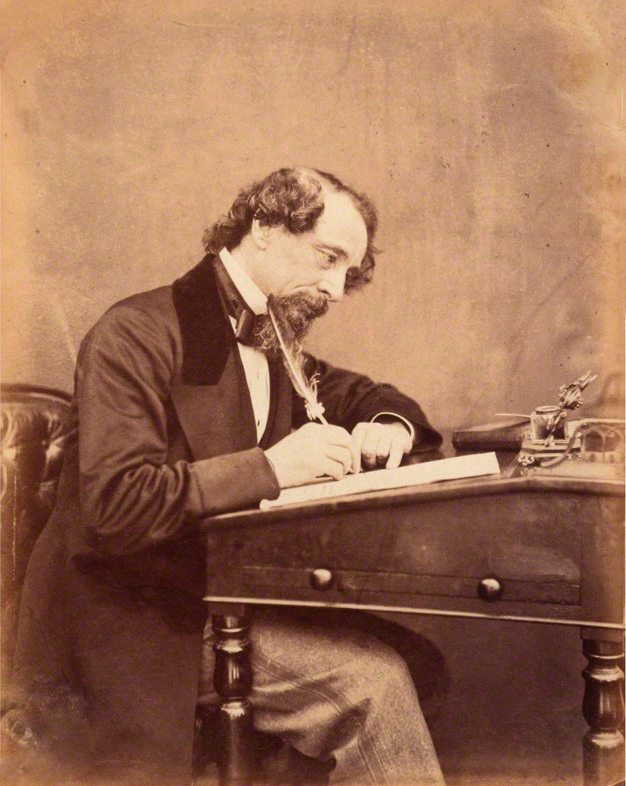
Dickens, who stayed at the Royal Pavilion, at his desk in 1858, by Herbert Watkins

==== "Out of Town" ====
Dickens described the fenestration of the Royal Pavilion Hotel in "Out of Town". Dickens referred to the building as "New Pavilionstone", writing "we are a little too much addicted to small windows with more bricks in them than glass." He criticised the architecture as being "not over-fanciful" with a noticeable lack of ornamental decoration and further noted poor construction quality, "we get unexpected sea-views through cracks in the street doors". Even with his earlier criticisms, Dickens conceded that "we are very snug and comfortable", something also shared by later nineteenth writings on the hotel, acknowledging that despite his disapproval of the exterior architectural aesthetic, the building was functional and the interior was "well accommodated". Dickens expressed belonging with the specific word choice of "our". Later on in the eulogium, Dickens listed the public areas, "if you are for public life at our great Pavilionstone Hotel, you walk into that establishment as if it were your club; and find ready for you, your news-room, dining-room, smoking-room, billard-room, music-room, public breakfast, public dinner twice-a-day (one plain, one gorgeous), hot baths and cold baths."

==== Royal visit ====
Shorncliffe Army Camp received a visit of review from Queen Victoria and Prince Albert on 9 August 1855. A Foreign Legion of approximately 2,900 arrived in Folkestone for the visit under the command of Brigadier-General Raines and Brigadier-General Wooldridge. During her stay in Folkestone, Queen Victoria allegedly visited the Pavilion Hotel, after which the hotel adopted the "Royal" prefix, becoming known as the Royal Pavilion Hotel.

=== 1896 to 1899: Late nineteenth century renovations ===
==== New ownership ====
In 1896, the ownership of the Royal Pavilion Hotel changed hands, and plans to refurbish the building were made public. (Note: Folkestone Chronicle 12 December 1896. Accessed: 7 October 2025) The refurbishment work was undertaken by Colonel R. W. Edis, with plans to have the hotel be comparable in appearance and comfort to other higher profile establishments. The developers Maple & Co had previously worked on the Coburg Hotel located at Grosvenor Square.

==== Interior design ====
Guest comfort was the primary focus of Maple & Co, with specific rooms in the Royal Pavilion building relocated, including the lounge to the centre of the building. Specialist interior designs were chosen, panelled wainscot oak for the walls, and frieze to mark Folkestone's shipbuilding history and active harbour. Decorative furnished chairs and settees were chosen for the lounge, antique Persian rugs sat atop a polished oaken floor, Oriental themed. Other rooms in the building such as the smoking room and billiard room were also intricately decorated, the former with mahogany rich satin wood inlayed Sheraton type furniture and the latter with oak fitted furniture and scarlet morocco upholstered chairs. The dining room was designed in a Georgian character, the furniture also of mahogany and upholstery of the chairs in a blue impressed morocco. The hotel's drawing room also functioned as a ballroom. The walls were designed with soft yellow silk panels, and the mantelpieces had elegant decorative depictions of classical landscape in similar soft colours.

==== Death of George Henry Newington ====
George Henry Newington, a bricklayer's labourer, was killed in an accident involving a hydraulic lift at the Royal Pavilion Hotel during renovations in 1899. The lift was used to carry food from the kitchen to the upper floors and was in operation when the incident occurred. Newington entered the lift in the afternoon as meals began being served. The cook, who was present nearby but not observing the lift at that moment, heard a shriek and turned to see that the lift's ram had dropped, crushing Newington beneath with the six-tons of available power. Attempts were made to free him, however Newington's injuries were fatal. (Note: Folkestone Chronicle 25 February 1899 Inquest. Accessed: 7 October 2025)

=== 1942 to 1945: HMS Allenby ===
During the Second World War, the Royal Pavilion Hotel was used as a Combined operation base under the name of "HMS Allenby", for the Royal Navy under the command of Vice Admiral Round Turner. British, American and troops of multiple nationalities were stationed in Folkestone at this time. HMS Allenby was commissioned for use between the period of 14 March 1943 and 10 April 1945, however records for the period show the base was in operation since 1 December 1942, possibly under the name of "Bluebird III".

== Motyl Burstin ==
=== 1955 to 1965: Burstin takeover and re-opening ===
Motyl Burstin purchased the Royal Pavilion in 1955 with plans to convert the building into residential flatlets for the elderly. This was completed by 1961. Plans were proposed by American sponsors headed by L. E. Detwiler in 1957 outlining a new 1000-bed hotel, improved ferry services from Folkestone and Dover respectively, a helicopter base within the inner Folkestone harbour and the building of two 90,000 passenger liners costing GBP£60 million equivalent to £1,256,691,932 in 2025. The Royal Pavilion Hotel had been operated by the War Office since World War II, and had not been in use since then. The plans involved repurposing the Royal Pavilion into use as offices, conference rooms and restaurants. Detwiler met with the Mayor of Folkestone, Lt. Colonel Bradley and The Anglo-Scottish and Foreign Trust Company, to explain his plans. The mayor offered his support to Detwiler, along with the Royal Pavilion Hotel where land for extending the building was available.

Folkestone Justices approved of proposed plans submitted by H. S. Worthing-Edridge for licensed parts of the Royal Pavilion Hotel in 1960. These plans included a bar in the reception room and the pre-war smoking room becoming a cocktail lounge. Building alterations under the design of the architect Cyril P. Griggs included the splitting of the north block from the main building with two new bars located there and changes to the banquet hall, toilets and cloakrooms. (Note: Folkestone Herald 28 May 1960. Local News Accessed: 12 October 2025) One year later, Motyl Burstin re-opened two bars, marking the first time since World War II where the public were able to purchase alcohol at the hotel. A lounge bar was opened in the previous booking office, with the proposed cocktail bar also opening. (Note: Folkestone Gazette 17 May 1961. Local News Accessed: 12 October 2025) In 1965, there was expressed interest in adding two new wings to the Royal Pavilion building.

=== 1973 to 1982: Demolition of the Royal Pavilion Hotel ===
By 1973, proposed demolition of the Royal Pavilion building had started, with the elderly residents to be relocated over time. A new hotel designed to resemble a ship, designed by the architect A. T. Bacon was outlined. Motyl Burstin described the new building's design as being "smart" and of a "conservative nature", with the aim to have the building "blend in with the area". A year later in 1974, a quarter of the new building had been completed, with rooms in the remaining Royal Pavilion Hotel building not re-let. This new hotel opened two years later in 1975 on the same site. Shepway District Council estimated in 1979 that repairs to the Royal Pavilion building would cost GBP£51,000 equivalent to £251,111 in 2025, with a GBP£75,000 equivalent to £369,282 in 2025 figure also quoted by the treasurer Arthur Ruderman. Pressure was put onto Motyl Burstin by councillor Will Harris to bulldoze the building otherwise repair funding would be withheld. Plans to rehome the remaining residents were also actioned. (Note: Folkestone Herald 16 June 1979. Local News Accessed: 18 October 2025) Demolition began in 1980. This was supported by local campaigners led by Rev. Tony Shepherd and members of the district council. (Note: Folkestone Herald 19 January 1980. Local News Accessed:18 October 2025) The demolition was finally completed in 1982, leaving only the south wing and back entrance of the original building remaining. The Hotel Burstin subsequently received an extension after the completed demolition of the older Royal Pavilion Hotel building, with the full docked cruise ship look fulfilled.

== Grand Burstin Hotel history ==
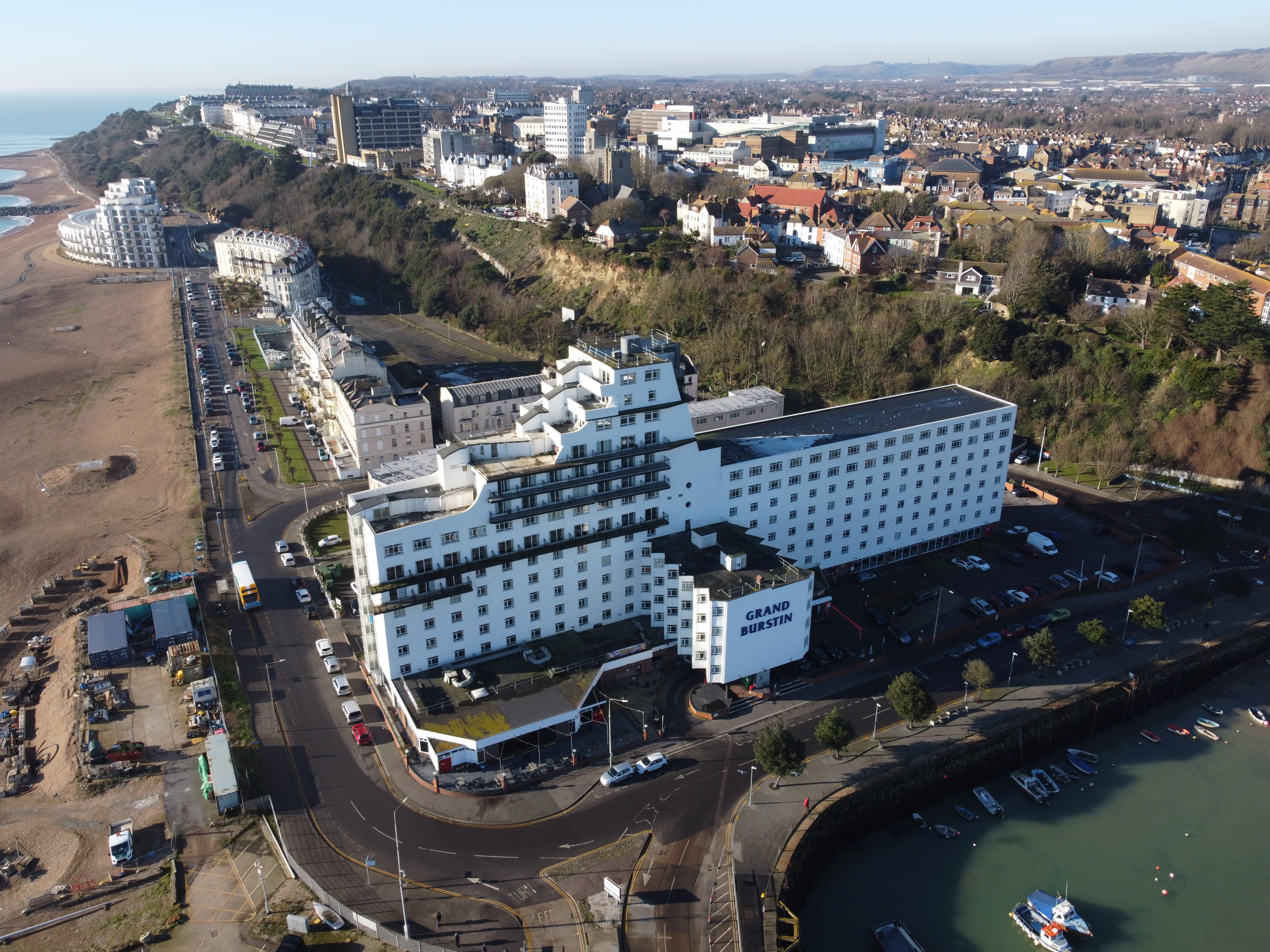
Aerial view

=== Early amenities ===
The early Hotel Burstin had guest rooms with private en suites, access to colour television, radio and telephone, along with a view of the English Channel. The hotel featured entertainment in the form of live music. After the Britannia Hotels takeover in 2004, the hotel also had facilities including an indoor swimming pool and sauna. A daily maid service was also established, with rooms equipped with tea and coffee facilities.

=== 1987 to 2004: Ownership succession and hauntings ===
Motyl Burstin sold Hotel Burstin to Land Leisure PLC in 1987. Following this the hotel had a succession of new owners including Control Securities, Ascot Holdings PLC and finally Leisure Great Britain PLC in 1995. The owner of Britannia Hotels, Alex Langsam, purchased the Hotel Burstin, then known as the Grand Burstin, from Grand Leisure Hotels Group, in 2004 for an undisclosed amount.

There have been reported sightings of a ghost named Mary haunting the Burstin. Mary was named after a waitress from the former Royal Pavilion who was allegedly attacked by a chef after he made unwanted romantic advances. The chef purportedly relocated Mary's body to a cellar, where her body remained undiscovered for several months. Mary has had reported sightings in the remaining Pavilion restaurant, described as having long curly black hair and a white dress. The Daily Mirror said her ghost could also be seen in mirrors present at the hotel. A hotel guest described seeing "a woman in a Victoria dress" and "was awoken at 3am by the same apparition". The Victorian furnishings and corridors have been compared to The Shining.

=== 2013 to 2019: Asbestos fines and asylum seekers ===
Britannia Hotels were fined £200,000 for failure to address asbestos during refurbishment to the Burstin in 2013, after issues were presented to Canterbury Crown Court by the Health and Safety Executive. A contractor was hired to complete the necessary work.

In 2014, 130 migrants were temporarily located to the Grand Burstin hotel for a two week period. The Home Office had transported them there due to other options already reaching capacity. Thirty of the migrants reportedly exited the hotel within 24 hours, whilst those still there promptly vacated before the two weeks had elapsed. The MP for Folkestone and Hythe, Damian Collins announced that Home Office contractors had made the decision to not provide access to local services to the migrants during their time at the hotel, directing them to asylum seeker centres for urgent care instead. They also maintained that the local council would not provide support. A further 59 migrants were provided emergency accommodation at the hotel by the Home Office in 2019. Staff and guests expressed concern with the arrangement although the migrants' stay was brief.

=== 2022 to 2023: Maintenance works ===
High winds, during the autumn of 2022, caused a section of the Grand Burstin Hotel's front elevation exterior to fall on top of a holiday coach, injuring the driver and a passenger. They were transported to hospital and Kent Fire and Rescue Service sectioned off the perimeter to prevent further injuries to the public. Scaffolding was put up after the removal of the section that had fallen, the front exterior was then completely dismantled. The following year, the Grand Burstin Hotel's exterior went under further maintenance with the entire external render system replaced due to it reaching the end of its usable life, with concrete and masonry repairs completed to the skeleton of the building. These works were carried out by JDF RS Limited at the cost of £700,000, who enacted cost-cutting measures by pinning un-bonded sections using render pins, followed by a coating system application. The underground support beams were also maintained with new steel support beams.

=== 2026 fire ===
Fire damaged cars in the basement car park of the hotel

Early in the morning of 19 September 2026, a fire led to the evacuation of approximately 280 guests, including members of the Liverpool band Space, and badly damaged the basement and ground floor of the hotel, with concerns about the stability of the building. Kent Police said they were treating the fire as possibly deliberately set. Two arrests were made in connection to the fire. They were later released. Fire crews remained stationed at the Burstin days later to "extinguish hotspots". Laundry was determined as one of the causes for these hotspots.

== Criticisms of The Grand Burstin Hotel ==
=== News outlets ===
The Daily Mirror published two separate reviews of the Grand Burstin. In 2020, Kent Live reporter John James checked into a room at the hotel, illustrating the exterior of the building as "filthy" and being "covered in green and brown dirt from who knows what decade". Similar to historic criticism, James said that the "bedroom suffered from the worn out aesthetic of the rest of the hotel" and concluded that even though the room was affordable, he would not stay there in the future. Gavin Haines of The Daily Telegraph stayed at the Burstin in 2025, marking the hotel as needing improvement both on the inside and the outside. Unimpressed with the quality of the hotel, he described the rose petals on his rooms bed as being "low-budget" and called the spa "scuzzy" and evoking "verruca socks". For the outside, Haines observed overflowing skips and rusty air conditioning units. On: Yorkshire Magazine highlighted the Burstin's "poor" rating on Tripadvisor, but compared the hotel to Marmite saying "you either love it or hate it".

Reviews from local news outlets have been slightly more favourable. James Pallant, reporting for KentOnline in 2022, found the mattress hard and the television non-functional and assumed that "the walls must be pretty thin" due to excessive noise. He praised the hotel's cleanliness and array of food, though noted it "wasn't the most flavourful food I've ever tasted", ultimately concluding that "the Grand Burstin is all right in my book". A 2022 review conducted by Lyndsey Young of Kent Live was more critical, with issues such as the carpets being filthy and a rusty towel rail in the bedroom en suite being highlighted. Similarly to Pallant's report, Young also commented that the breakfast options she was presented with looked "unappetising" and that sleeping was difficult because "when the person in the next room put the shower on or flushed the loo" it made "a sound like a ship coming into the harbour".

=== Other concerns ===
==== Hygiene concerns ====
The Guardian reported in 2020 that the Burstin's management company, Britannia Hotels, had a Which? customer score of 37%. At the Grand Burstin, researchers reportedly found "stray hairs, stained towels and surfaces that had not been thoroughly cleaned". A writer reported spraying "towels and bedsheets with Hazmat UV fluid" to analyse how thorough room cleaning was between guests. Germ simulation powder was also used on "common touch areas, including the light switches and door handles". Results showed that specific items "lit up" under the UV black light, including television remotes, door handles, plug sockets, kettles and coffee mugs. Bathroom results further lit up on the bathroom taps, soap dispenser, toilet brush and chain. Bedding and towels did not light up however, meaning they had been changed between guests. Hedi Mehrez of Kent Live described a "musty smell" in his room, however he adjusted to the smell. Andrew Eames of BBC Travel described an unpleasant in the room he stayed at, where his "room smelled of stale cigarettes".

== Appearances in media ==
The 2023 film Who Is Erin Carter?, which stars Evin Ahmad, had scenes filmed on location at the Grand Burstin Hotel, at The Stade, the Folkestone Harbour Arm and Folkestone Harbour. The interior of the Grand Burstin Hotel was used as the Victorian ballroom in Danny Boyle's 2022 Disney+ miniseries Pistol.
