= Alex Langsam =

British businessman (born 1938)

Alex Langsam (born June 1938) is a British businessman. He founded Britannia Hotels in 1976. In 2011, he bought Pontins for an estimated £20 million. The Sunday Times Rich List estimated his wealth as £401 million in 2025.

== Early life ==
Langsam was born in Vienna to Jewish parents, three months after the Anschluss, the Nazi German annexation of Austria. His family left their financial assets in Austria and settled in Hove in England. Langsam said in 2011 that his father was the "most nationalistic person I have ever come across" and credited Britain for saving his life.

Langsam earned a degree in economics from Aberystwyth University, and said that it was the only institution that would allow him to study without an O‑Level in mathematics. He then became an estate agent and property developer.

== Business career ==
In 1976, Langsam bought the Country House Hotel in Didsbury, Manchester. The building had been derelict, and he renamed it the Britannia Hotel, which then became the name of the chain. In 1982, his business expanded by purchasing the assets of British Transport Hotels, a division of British Rail.

By 2011, Langsam had an estimated wealth of £64 million from 36 hotels, including the Adelphi Hotel in Liverpool and the Grand Hotel, Scarborough. He said that his business plan involved buying and renovating declining historical hotels and pitching them to the mass market; the Great Recession had led to more British tourists holidaying in their own country.

In February 2011, Langsam paid an estimated £20 million to buy Pontins holiday resorts, which was under administration. The deal saved 850 jobs.

In the 2020s, Britannia entered contracts with the UK government to house asylum seekers, earning Langsam the nickname "The Asylum King". By June 2023, the company was accommodating a tenth of the asylum seekers in the country, with 17 hotels block-booked by the government. In the 2021–22 financial year, the company made record profits of £33.4 million. Tim Naor Hilton, chief executive of Refugee Action, criticised companies for profiting from the asylum crisis. In the 2025 Sunday Times Rich List, Langsam featured at number 311 with an estimated wealth of £401 million. In February 2026, Langsam was listed 90th on the Sunday Times Tax List with an estimated £12.8 million.

== Legal affairs ==
Since 1999, Langsam has had non-domiciled status with the Inland Revenue through his father's Austrian residence. He sued his accountants, Hacker Young, for negligence for not informing him in 1993 that he qualified for this; he achieved the status in 1999 on the advice of other accountants. Hacker Young paid Langsam £1 million in a confidential settlement in 2006, without admitting liability.

After the Hacker Young case, Langsam sued his solicitors, Beachcroft, alleging that they had given him "extremely cautious" advice in that case, and that he could have settled for £3 million. His case was rejected by the High Court of Justice, and at the Court of Appeal in 2013; a judge at the latter said "Mr Langsam's claim is highly unusual, if not unprecedented".
