= Sachas Hotel =

Hotel in Manchester, England

Britannia Sachas Hotel
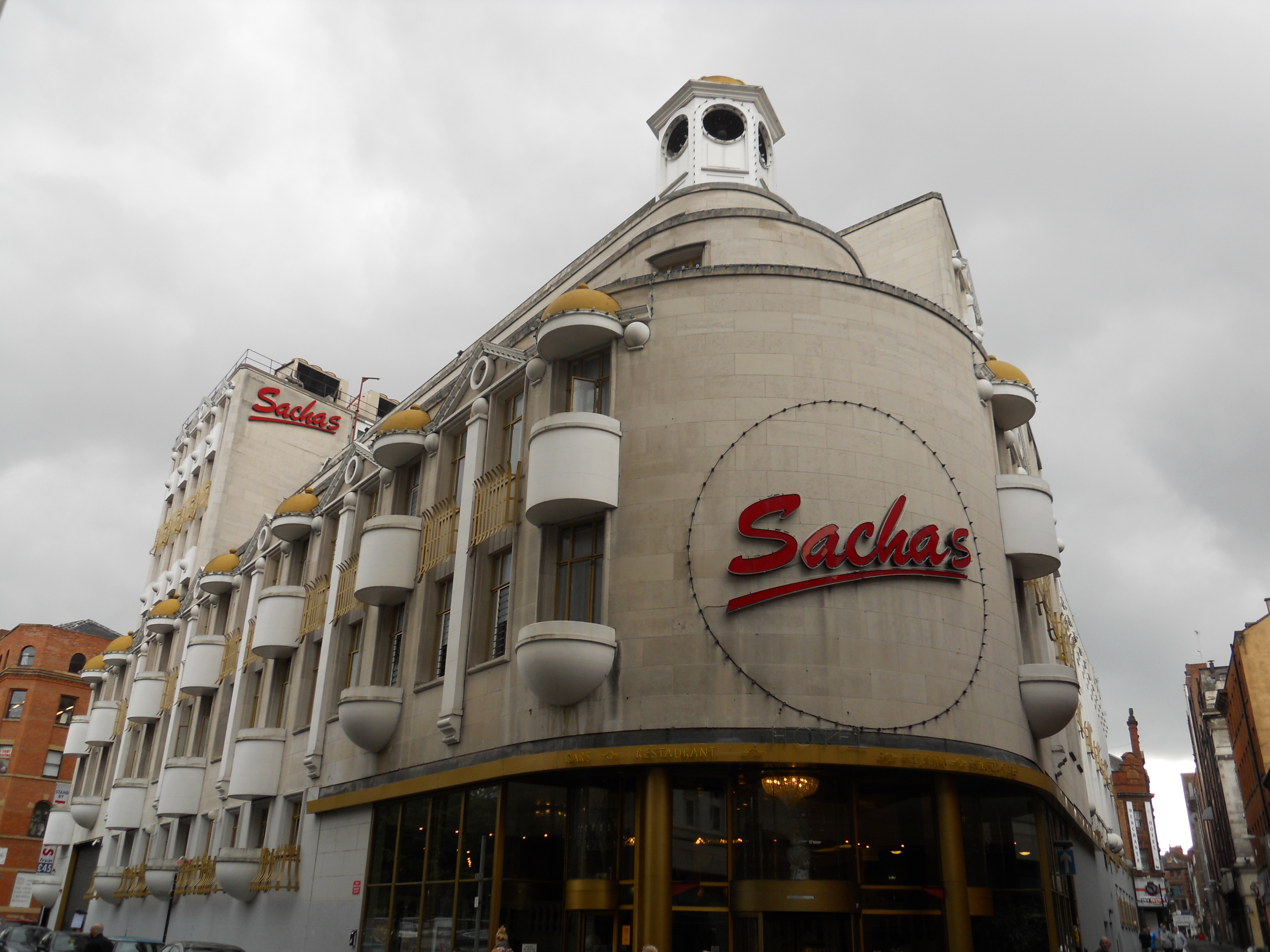
- Interactive map of the Britannia Sachas Hotel area

General information
- Location: 12 Tib Street, Back Piccadilly, Manchester, M4 1SH, Manchester, United Kingdom
- Coordinates: 53.4822°N 2.2373°W
- Owner: Alex Langsam; Hawksford Trust Company Jersey Limited
- Operator: Britannia Hotels

Other information
- Number of rooms: 223
- Number of restaurants: 2

Sachas Hotel is a hotel in Manchester, England. The original building was built and opened as the C&A store in 1928, which later moved to a three-storey shop in the Arndale Centre in 1978. The building was converted into a hotel in 1987.

The C&A store was designed by North, Robin & Wilsdon, faced in cream-coloured faience (glazed terracotta) and adopted a simplified classicism with art deco touches, such as chevron decoration at the top of the piers and on the panels beneath the windows. This was an early appearance of art deco on the British high street. The hotel has its main entrance on Tib Street and is part of the Britannia Hotels group. It offers 3 Star accommodation, events spaces, plus the services of Spindles Health & Leisure Club including a heated swimming pool. The leisure club as of 2022 is closed.

Like most of the early Britannia Hotels properties, Sachas Hotel was fitted out with opulent décor and originally came with a 4-star rating. Since the 1990s, the hotel has received minimal investment and retains many original features.

The hotel has 223 bedrooms and seven meeting rooms, the USA Suite has a capacity of up to 550 people, making it one of the largest hotel function spaces in central Manchester. As of 2026, all restaurants at Sachas Hotel have closed and no food is available on site.
