= Ranelagh Gardens, Liverpool =

British amusement part established in the 18th century

Coordinates: 53.4055°N 2.9774°W

Ranelagh Gardens was the first open space for public recreation to be created in Liverpool, Merseyside, England. It was opened in 1722 and was modelled on Ranelagh Gardens in Chelsea, which was at that time just outside London. It contained a formal flower garden, and a number of separate areas for the visitors to meet and socialise. There was a charge for admission, and a strict code of behaviour was imposed. Refreshments were available, and in the centre of the gardens was a fishpond containing carp, tench, and other fish. The gardens continued to be open until the late 1790s. The site is now occupied by the Adelphi Hotel.
