= Richard Relhan =

Richard Relhan (1754–1823) was a botanist, a fellow of King's College, Cambridge, and author of a renowned book about the plants around Cambridge.

Relhan, the son of Dr. Anthony Relhan, was born at Dublin in 1754. He was elected a King's Scholar at Westminster School in 1767, and was admitted a scholar of Trinity College, Cambridge, on 7 May 1773. He graduated B.A. in 1776 and M.A. in 1779, and, having taken holy orders, was chosen in 1781 fellow and conduct (or chaplain) of King's College, Cambridge.

In 1783 Professor Thomas Martyn (1735–1825) gave Relhan all the manuscript notes he had made on Cambridge plants since the publication of his Plantae Cantabrigienses in 1763. With this assistance Relhan published his chief work, the Flora Cantabrigiensis in 1785, describing several new plants and including seven plates engraved by James Sowerby. It appears from his letters that he proposed to issue a 'Flora Anglica, but did not meet with sufficient encouragement. He published supplements to the Flora Cantabrigiensis in 1787, 1788, and 1793, and second and third editions of the whole in 1802 and 1820, the last edition being greatly amplified. In 1787 he printed Heads of Lectures on Botany read in the University of Cambridge.

Relhan was made a fellow of the Royal Society on 12 June 1787, and in 1788 became one of the original fellows of the Linnean Society. In 1791 he accepted the college rectory of Hemingby, Lincolnshire. Living in retirement there, he devoted himself to the study of Tacitus. In 1809 he published an edition of Tacitus de Moribus Germanorum et de Vita Agricolse; and in 1819 an edition of the Historia. His annotations were largely based upon those of the French Jesuit scholar, Gabriel Brotier. Relhan died on 28 March 1823.

As a botanist he showed most originality in dealing with the Cryptogamia. His name was commemorated by L'Heritier in a genus, Relhania, comprising a few species of South African Composite. Many fungi were named by Richard Relhan.

Relhan was also a talented painter. There is a watercolor painted by him of the Barnwell Leper Chapel, the oldest complete building in Cambridge.
