= Anthony Relhan =

Irish physician (c.1715–1776)

Anthony Relhan (c. 1715–1776) was a physician and fellow of the King and Queen's College of Physicians of Ireland, notable for writing a history of Brighton, and for promoting the drinking of mineral water.

== Life ==
Born in Munster, Ireland, he was educated at Trinity College, Dublin, where he became a scholar in 1734, and B.A. in 1735. On 15 October 1740 he began to study medicine at Leyden, and on 12 July 1743 graduated M.D. at Dublin. He became a fellow of the King and Queen's College of Physicians of Ireland in October 1747, and was elected president of the college in 1755. Three years later he left Dublin in consequence of disagreements with other fellows of the college as to the propriety of his prescribing the powder called after Robert James, M.D., a remedy of which the composition was kept secret by the proprietor.

He settled as a physician at Brighthelmstone (later called Brighton) in 1759, and in 1761 published A Short History of Brighthelmstone, then a town of about two thousand inhabitants, of which the main purposes were to give an account of the climate and other advantages of the place as a residence for invalids, and to promote the drinking of mineral waters and seabathing.^{[a]} Relhan's publication led to a substantial increase in public interest in drinking mineral water.

Relhan also authored a treatise on the use of music in medicine, and several other medical publications.

In 1763, having been incorporated M.D. at Cambridge, he became a candidate or member of the College of Physicians of London, and was elected a fellow on 25 June 1764. In the same year he published 'Refutation of the Reflections [by D. Rust and others] against Inoculation'. He delivered at the College of Physicians the Gulstonian lectures in 1765, and the Harveian Oration on 18 Oct. 1770. The oration, which is altogether occupied with the praise of Thomas Linacre and the other benefactors of the college, dwells at some length on the friendship of Erasmus and Linacre.

Relhan used to reside and practise at Brighton during the bathing season, and from 1758 to 1767, he had an office on Southampton Street in London.

He was twice married, and by his first wife had one son, Richard, and a daughter. His second wife was Lady Hart, (nee Denise Gougeon, later Blondeau), widow of Sir William Hart, a banker. He died in October 1776, and was buried in the Marylebone graveyard in Paddington Street, London.

His son, Richard Relhan was a fellow of King's College, and published a renowned account of the plants growing near Cambridge.

The town of Enfield, New Hampshire, was first named "Enfield" by settlers from Enfield, Connecticut, but the town was renamed "Relhan" in 1766 to honour Anthony Relhan. Following the Revolution, the town was renamed "Enfield" in 1784.

== See also ==
- Dr. Richard Russell

== Notes ==
a. Relhan's predecessor, the eminent physician Dr. Richard Russell (1687–1759), a resident of Lewes and Brighton (which are close to the chalybeate spring of Hove), had advocated drinking seawater.
