= Britannia Hotels =

Budget British hotel group

Britannia Hotels Limited
- Type: Private
- Industry: Hospitality
- Founded: 1976
- Headquarters: Hale, Greater Manchester, England
- Number of locations: 64 (Note: The Royal Albion Hotel was damaged by a fire in July 2023, so only 63 of the 64 hotels are operational as of February 2024)
- Key people: Alex Langsam, CEO; Robert Ferrari, CFO
- Products: Hotels; Property development
- Services: Conference room hire, banqueting functions, health club membership
- Revenue: ▲£154.790m (2023)
- Operating income: ▲£5.2m (2023)
- Net income: ▲£31.692m (2023)
- Owner: Alex Langsam; Hawksford Trust Company Jersey Limited
- Number of employees: 12,000
- Subsidiaries: Britannia Adelphi Hotel Ltd; Birmingham International Hotel Ltd; Ambassador Hotels (Bournemouth) Ltd; Ambassador (East Cliff) Ltd; Britannia Hotel Bolton Ltd; Britannia Hotel Leeds Ltd; Britannia Country House Hotel Ltd; Britannia Hotel Edinburgh Ltd; Britannia Hotel Wolverhampton Ltd; Pontins Holiday Parks
- Website: www.britanniahotels.com

Britannia Hotels is a British budget hotel group with 64 properties across Great Britain. The company also owns the Pontins Holiday Parks.

Since 2010, the chain has attracted sustained criticism for the hygiene and maintenance standards at its sites; consumer group Which? has repeatedly ranked Britannia Hotels as the worst hotel operator in the United Kingdom since October 2013. This has contributed to a growing perception of Britannia Hotels as "Britain's worst hotel chain".

== History ==
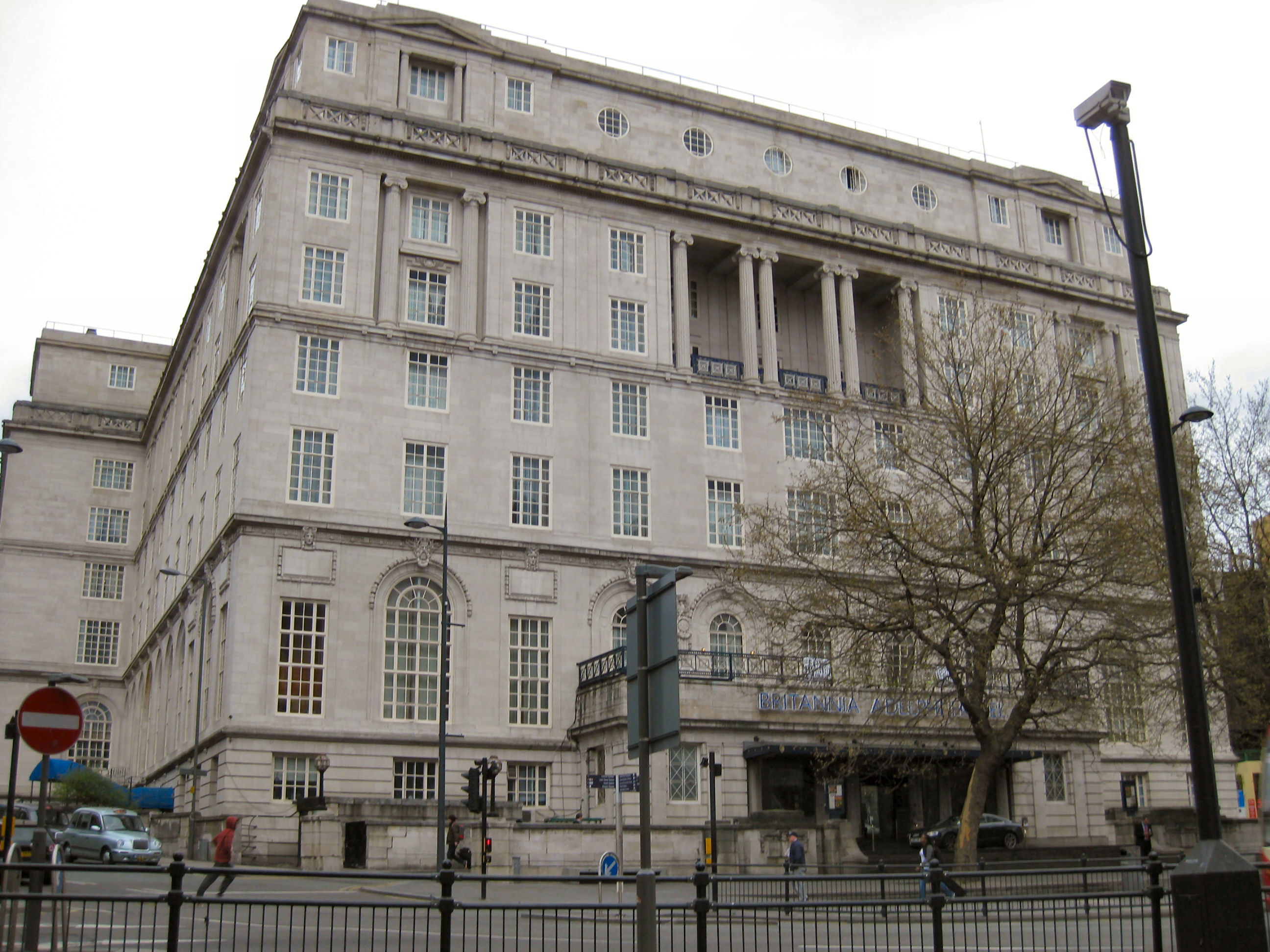
The Britannia Adelphi Hotel, Liverpool

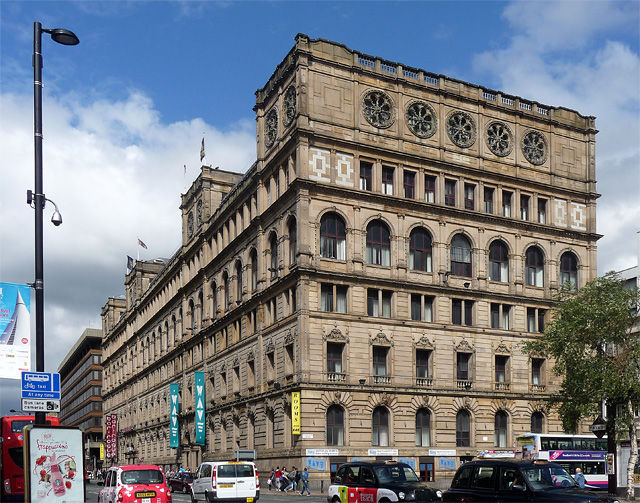
The Britannia Hotel, formerly Watts Warehouse, Manchester

=== Foundation and early years ===
Britannia Hotels was founded in 1976 with the purchase of the Britannia Country House Hotel in Didsbury, Manchester. Its chief executive, founder, and largest shareholder remains Alex Langsam. Langsam is a non-domiciled UK resident, registered as living in Austria for tax purposes since 1999. His net personal worth was valued at £401 million in 2025 by The Sunday Times.

The company's head office is Halecroft, a Grade II* listed building in Hale. A large cluster of the company's hotels are located in and around Manchester.

Soon after its foundation, Britannia began making a number of further acquisitions. The second purchase in 1981 was a derelict listed building in central Manchester (the former Watts Warehouse standing on Portland Street). After redeveloping the unit, it opened in May 1982 as the Britannia Hotel Manchester. At the end of 1982, British Rail sold off its hotel division, British Transport Hotels. From this sale, in 1983, Britannia bought the Britannia Adelphi Hotel in Liverpool.

In the mid-1980s, Alex Langsam acquired the Grade II* listed London Road Fire Station in Manchester for the group. Proposals to redevelop it into a hotel and offices were delayed and, in 2006, it was placed on English Heritage's register of "at risk" historical buildings. The city council's attempt to compulsorily purchase the building was rejected on 29 November 2011. In 2015, Britannia sold the building to Allied London which began redevelopment as a mixed-use leisure and hotel facility.

The 1988 Philip Saville film The Fruit Machine featured interior and main entrance scenes of the Adelphi Hotel in Liverpool, including a vertical pan shot past the lit marquee at night.

In 1987, Britannia Hotels converted an unused building in Manchester that had been the city's C&A department store - this became the Sachas Hotel. Later, in the same year, Bosworth Hall, a country house style hotel in Market Bosworth, Leicestershire, was purchased. Bosworth Hall was being converted from a hospital/nursing home into a hotel and Britannia took over the development from the builders who went bankrupt. In 1988, the company purchased and began development of the International Hotel adjacent to Canary Wharf in London. The hotel opened on 9 June 1992. A year later, Britannia took over a 187-bedroom hotel in Stockport. After a period of refurbishment, the Britannia Stockport Hotel opened in 1993. In the summer of the same year, the group also purchased the Europa Hotel situated close to Gatwick Airport.

=== Development since 2000 ===
In the following 10 years, the group acquired 16 more hotels in locations such as Birmingham, Aberdeen and Newcastle. In November 2004, it acquired four hotels from the Grand Leisure Group: the Grand Hotel in Scarborough, the Grand Hotel in Llandudno, the Grand Burstin Hotel in Folkestone, and the Grand Metropole in Blackpool. In January 2011, the company bought North West holiday camp business Pontins out of administration in an £18.5 million deal which safeguarded about 1,000 jobs. Following the acquisition, Britannia had to deal with a series of complaints.

From 2005 to 2015, the group had its most rapid period of expansion, acquiring 23 hotels, including the Palace Hotel in Buxton and the Basingstoke Country Hotel acquired from the Hotel Collection and the Trecarn Hotel Torquay and Cavendish Hotel in Eastbourne. In 2016, Britannia Hotels also purchased The Bromsgrove Hotel & Spa which had been owned and operated by Hilton. Later in 2017, Britannia Hotels acquired the Royal Hotel in Hull from the Mercure Hotel Group, expanding to 53 hotels.

In 2008, as part of the Capital of Culture celebrations, a musical based on the Adelphi Hotel, written and directed by Phil Willmott, Once Upon a Time at the Adelphi, ran at the Liverpool Playhouse from 30 June until 2 August.

Britannia Hotels purchased nine hotels, reaching a total of 61, between 2017 and 2021, when it acquired The Grand Hotel Gosforth Park (formerly Marriott) in Newcastle, The Grand Hotel Sunderland (formerly Marriott), The Grand Hotel Blackpool (formerly Hilton), The Meon Valley Hotel, Golf & Country Club near Southampton, The Sprowston Manor Hotel & Country Club near Norwich, The Hollins Hall Hotel, Golf & Country Club in Baildon, Bradford, The Coylumbridge Hotel (formerly Hilton) in Aviemore and The Royal Clifton Hotel in Southport.

On 15 July 2023, a fire broke out in one of the rooms in the Royal Albion Hotel, Brighton, reducing most of the Grade II building to a shell. It was made worse by the high winds over the weekend which made fighting the fire challenging. This left the façade unstable, requiring most of the exterior to be demolished.

== List of properties ==
As of February 2024, Britannia Hotels operate 64 hotels, all in Great Britain:

=== Branded hotels ===
Brand	Locations	Total
Britannia Hotels	Aberdeen; Birmingham; Bolton; Bournemouth; Coventry; Coventry Hill; Edinburgh; Glasgow; Hampstead (London); Leeds; Leeds Bradford Airport; Manchester (Grade II* listed); Airport Hotel Manchester; Manchester Country House; Newcastle Airport; Nottingham; Stockport; Wigan; Wolverhampton	19
Airport Inn	Gatwick Airport; Manchester Hotel & Spa	2
Grand Hotel	Blackpool; Llandudno; Gosforth Park; Scarborough (Grade II* listed); Sunderland	5
Total properties		26

=== Individually named hotels ===
Location	Properties	Total	Notes
Aviemore	Coylumbridge Aviemore Hotel	1	
Basingstoke	Country Hotel	1	
Birmingham	Bromsgrove Hotel & Spa	1	
Blackpool	Metropole Hotel; Norbreck Castle Hotel; Savoy Hotel	3	
Bournemouth	Carrington House Hotel; Heathlands Hotel; Roundhouse Hotel; Royal Bath Hotel	4	The Royal Bath Hotel is Grade II listed.
Brighton	Royal Albion Hotel	1	Grade II* listed. Damaged by fire in 2023.
Buxton	Palace Hotel	1	Grade II listed.
Bradford	Midland Hotel; Hollins Hall Hotel - Golf & Country Club	2	Corner block of the Midland Hotel is Grade II listed.
Coventry	Royal Court Hotel	1	
Eastbourne	Cavendish Hotel	1	
Folkestone	The Grand Burstin Hotel	1	
Gatwick	Europa Gatwick Hotel; Gatwick Lodge; Russ Hill Hotel	3	
Kingston upon Hull	Royal Hotel	1	
Liverpool	Adelphi Hotel	1	Grade II listed.
London	International Hotel	1	
Manchester	Ashley Hotel; Sachas Hotel	2	
Market Bosworth	Bosworth Hall Hotel & Spa	1	Grade II* listed.
Norwich	Sprowston Manor Hotel	1	
Peterhead	Waterside Hotel	1	
Prestwick	Adamton Country House	1	
Runcorn / Warrington	Daresbury Park Hotel & Spa	1	Located in Runcorn though stated by the company as being in neighbouring Warrington.
Scarborough	Clifton Hotel; Royal Hotel	2	
Southampton	Meon Valley Hotel, Golf & Country Club	1	
Southport	Prince of Wales Hotel; Scarisbrick Hotel; The Royal Clifton Hotel	3	
Stoke on Trent	North Stafford Hotel	1	Grade II* listed.
Torquay	Trecarn Hotel	1	
Total properties		38	

== Reviews and prosecutions ==
=== Reviews ===
Which? customer scores (hotel chains)
Year	BH score	1st score	1st chain	Ref.
2013	36%	78%	Q Hotels	
2014	33%	83%	Sofitel	
2015	—N/a	83%	Premier Inn	
2016	44%	83%	Premier Inn	
2017	33%	79%	Premier Inn	
2018	35%	79%	Premier Inn	
2019	39%	79%	Premier Inn; Wetherspoons	
2020	37%	86%	Sofitel	
2021	49%	79%	Premier Inn	
2022	56%	78%	Premier Inn	
2023	48%	77%	Hotel Indigo	
2025	44%	81%	Coaching Inn Group	

Britannia Hotels has been subject to widespread criticism on many issues, most notably in hygiene and maintenance. In November 2025, consumer group Which? declared Britannia Hotels to be the worst hotel chain in the United Kingdom for 12 years, in last place with an overall score of 44%. Britannia Hotels had been last place in the Which? hotel chain rankings since October 2013, when the editor Richard Headland warned that other chains (such as Premier Inn) were undercutting Britannia with better service at similar prices.

In 2005 and 2006, the Grand Hotel in Scarborough and the Britannia Adelphi were investigated by the BBC over theft and hygiene. In November 2014, an undercover investigation by the Liverpool Echo found issues with the upkeep of both the exterior and interior of the Adelphi, warning that the ageing interiors and basic service placed Britannia Hotels at a disadvantage in the fast-evolving "cut-throat" tourism industry. In 2019, Which? journalists found the Britannia Lodge near Gatwick Airport to be in a worse condition, reporting smells of damp because of a clogged ventilation fan, a bathroom affected by mould, and stains revealed under ultraviolet light. In the following year, Which? reported that the situation had not improved, despite the COVID-19 pandemic and the renewed interest in luxury hotels for staycations.

Hotel research and booking site Oyster.com has reviewed a number of Britannia Hotels. The website commended most of the reviewed locations for their proximity to city centres or public transport hubs and efforts to renovate some rooms in the Manchester location, but raised concerns about outdated interiors, inconsistent maintenance, and Wi-Fi access fees, the latter generally considered inappropriate in a country where internet access is a major part of daily life.

In December 2018, the Britannia Royal at Kingston upon Hull cancelled a charity reservation for rough sleepers on Christmas Eve and Christmas Day without giving a reason. The incident led to a criticism against Britannia Hotels, which temporarily removed its presence from social media.

=== Asylum contracts ===
Britannia Hotels is one of the best-known providers of asylum seeker accommodation in the UK. This has led to Alex Langsam being described as an "asylum king" by The Daily Telegraph.

Protests at the Britannia Canary Wharf took place after an asylum seeker staying there entered a nearby flat. The case was dropped due to lack of evidence.

Protests have also taken place at Britannia Wolverhampton. Another well-known Britannia asylum hotel is the Metropole in Blackpool.

=== Response to COVID-19 ===
In March 2020, Britannia Hotels attracted widespread condemnation for its response to the COVID-19 pandemic: on 19 March, the Coylumbridge Aviemore Hotel sacked and evicted approximately 30 staff who lived in the hotel without notice or redundancy pay, leaving several homeless. Britannia Hotels later reversed the decision under widespread political and public pressure, but claimed that the sackings were due to an "administrative error". Staff were also dismissed and evicted at the Britannia-owned Pontins holiday parks.

On 24 March 2020, Manchester City Council reported that Britannia Hotels evicted homeless people from Britannia's two city centre hotels (Britannia Manchester and Sachas Hotel), despite an agreement between Britannia and the council to accommodate them.

=== Food hygiene ===
In September 2007, Manchester Crown Court fined Britannia Hotels £39,486 for food hygiene offences at the Britannia Hotel in Stockport, shortly after TripAdvisor rated it as one of Britain's dirtiest hotels. In December 2014, magistrates at the Nuneaton Justice Centre fined Britannia Hotels £25,400 for food hygiene offences at the Royal Court Hotel in Coventry. In June 2017, the Adelphi was prosecuted for breaches of food safety and hygiene regulations.

=== Health and safety ===
Britannia Hotels was prosecuted for breaking health and safety laws after a student drowned in the Adelphi's swimming pool in 2006. In November 2015, the Liverpool Echo investigated a guest's complaints about the Adelphi. Further issues with the Adelphi have been reported since. The Liverpool Echo visited the company's headquarters in June 2019 to interview a spokesperson about the complaints, but no-one would speak to the journalists.

In 2013 in Canterbury Crown Court, the chain was ordered to pay £200,000 in fines and costs for putting guests and construction workers at risk of exposure to asbestos at the Grand Burstin Hotel in Folkestone.

In 2021, the chain was fined £86,000 after an employee fell through rusted railings and suffered life-changing injuries at the Prince of Wales Hotel in Southport. Sefton Council also issued an improvement notice after no attempt was made to make the area safe after the accident occurred.

On 10 September 2022, a 21-year-old woman was crushed to death by a wardrobe whilst staying at the Britannia Adelphi hotel.
