= Royal Hotel, Scarborough =

Hotel in Scarborough, North Yorkshire, England

Coordinates: 54.2815°N 0.3987°W

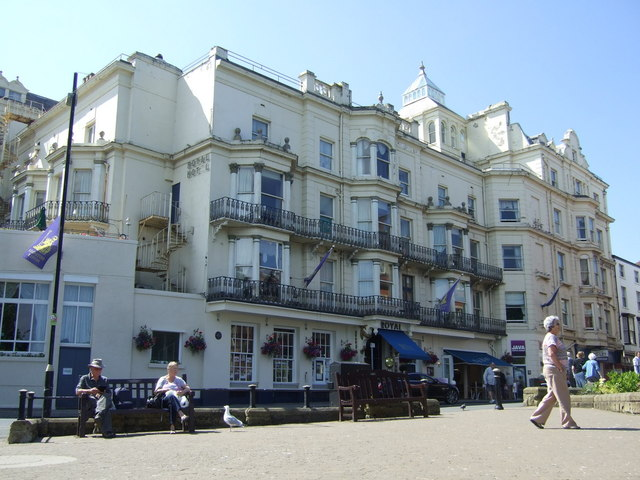
The hotel, in 2014

The Royal Hotel is a historic building in Scarborough, North Yorkshire, a town in England.

In 1725, an assembly room or "Long Room" was constructed on St Nicholas Street, reputedly to a design by Richard Boyle, 3rd Earl of Burlington. It contained an Egyptian-themed hall, measuring 112 feet (34 m) by 40 feet (12 m), and as high as it was wide. This became the principal location for grand balls in the town in the 18th century. Around 1800, it was purchased by Richard Donner, and was renamed "Donner's Rooms". In 1820, Donner turned the building into a hotel, by adding bedrooms. He sold the building in about 1840, and the new owners renamed it as the "Royal Hotel". In 1847, they added Donner's former house to the hotel, then in 1862 a new block was added, to a design by Henry Wyatt. In 1897, some of the first films shown in the UK were exhibited in the hotel by Louis Lumière.

In 1935, the hotel was purchased by the Laughton family, who demolished the billiards room and constructed a new dining room in its place. They also purchased many paintings by well-known artists for display in the hotel, several of which are now in the collection of Scarborough Art Gallery. During this period, Winston Churchill once stayed as a guest. In the early 21st century, the hotel was owned by English Rose Hotels. In 2012, it was purchased by Britannia Hotels, at which time, it had 118 bedrooms.

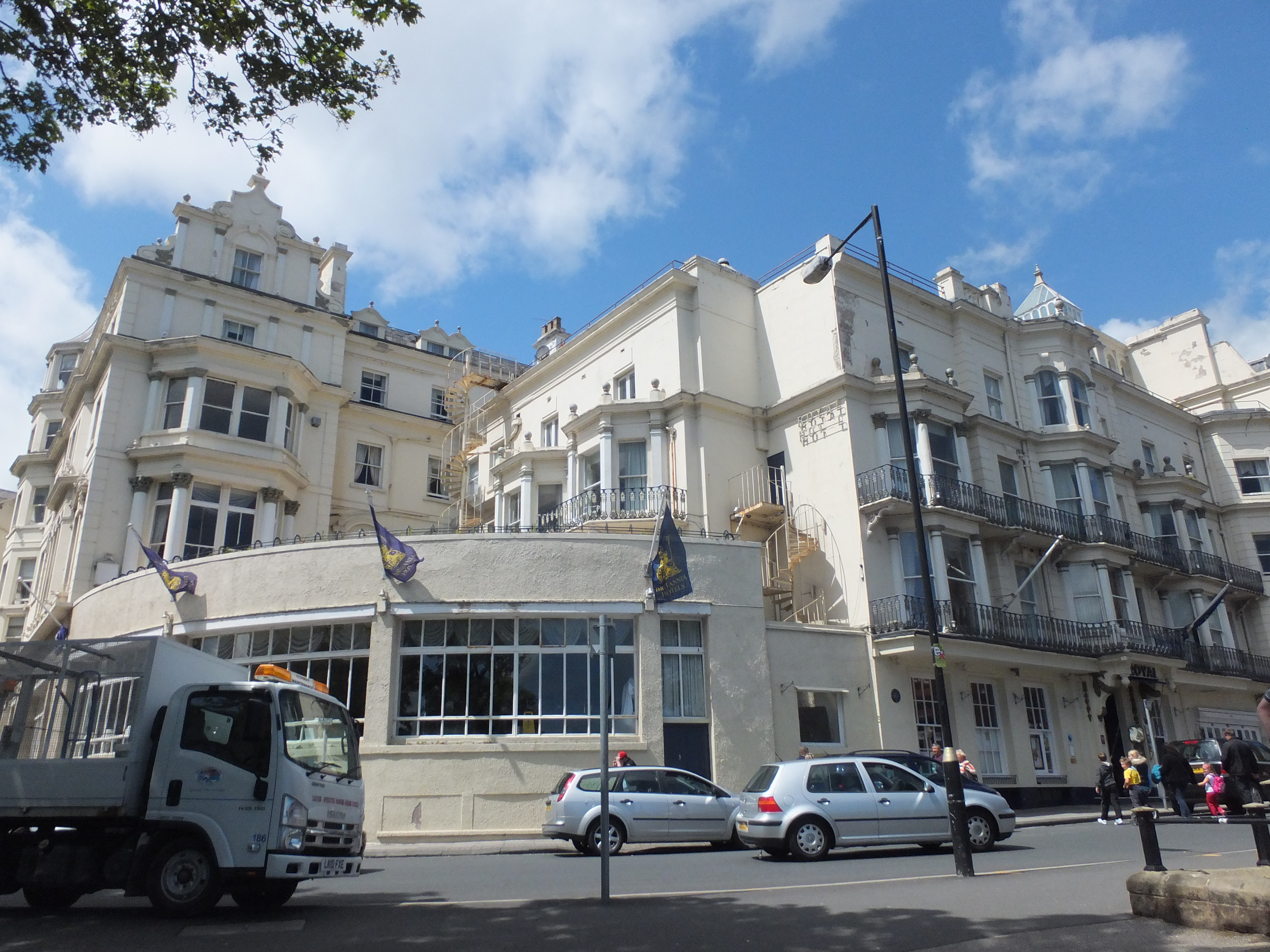
The curved dining room

The hotel is on a curved corner site. It is stuccoed, and has a cornice, a parapet, four storeys and a complex plan. The main front has two and three-storey canted bay windows with Corinthian colonnettes, and along the middle two floors are continuous balconies. The doorway is flanked by Composite columns. Inside, there is a grand staircase hall rising the full height of the building, with a curved iron staircase. The first floor lounge retains mid-19th century plasterwork and a marble fireplace. The ballroom may retain some fabric from the original Long Room, but is heavily altered. The building has been grade II listed since 1973.

== See also ==
- Listed buildings in Scarborough (Castle Ward)
