= Richard Russell (doctor) =

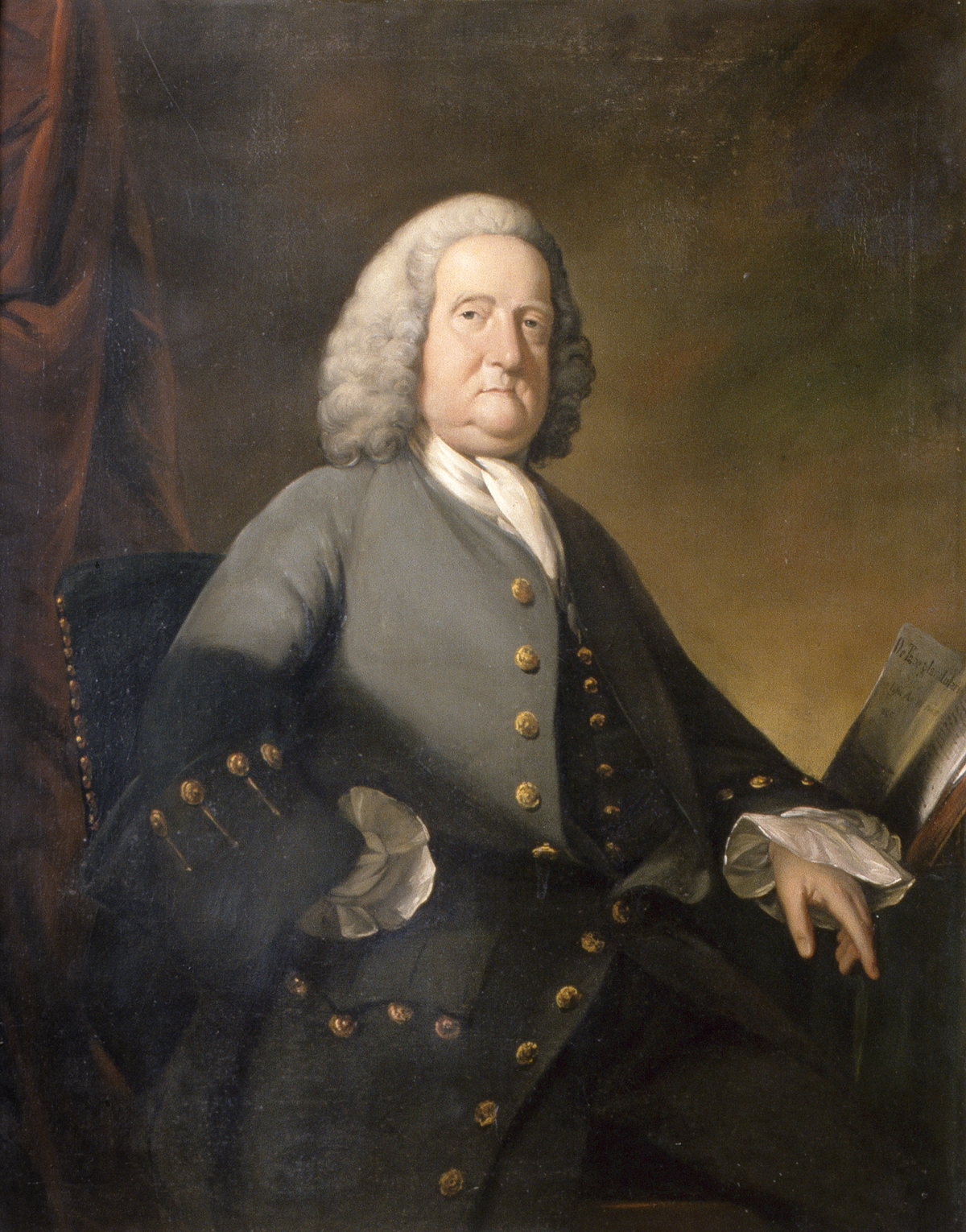
Richard Russell by Benjamin Wilson, about 1755, Brighton and Hove Museums and Art Galleries

Richard Russell (26 November 1687 – 1759) (Note: This Richard Russell has previously been confused with Richard Russel (1714?–1771), physician, possibly born on 18 December 1714 at Selmeston, Sussex, the son of the Revd Richard Russel MA, vicar of Alfriston and of Selmeston, and his wife, Juliana.) was an 18th-century British physician who encouraged his patients to use a form of water therapy that involved the submersion or bathing in, and drinking of, seawater. The contemporary equivalent of this is thalassotherapy, although the practice of drinking seawater has largely discontinued.

== Early life ==
Richard Russell was the son of Nathaniel Russell, a surgeon of Lewes, Sussex, who at one time owned Ranscomb Manor, in South Malling, near Lewes. He was the eldest of seven children, his siblings being: Mary (b. 1689), John (b. 1691), Nathaniell (b. 1694), Elizabeth (b. 1695/96), Hannah (b. 1699), and Charity (b. 1701).

== Medical career ==
Russell began his medical practice in Lewes in 1725. Records indicate that in 1742, he purchased a manor in Ditchling from Thomas Godfrey, John Legas, and Legas' wife, Judith. "Between 1758 and 1760 it passed to Dr. Russell's son William Russell, who assumed his mother's surname of Kempe, and he held it until 1787," after which it was owned by John Ingram, and thence Charles James Ingram.

=== Brighton ===
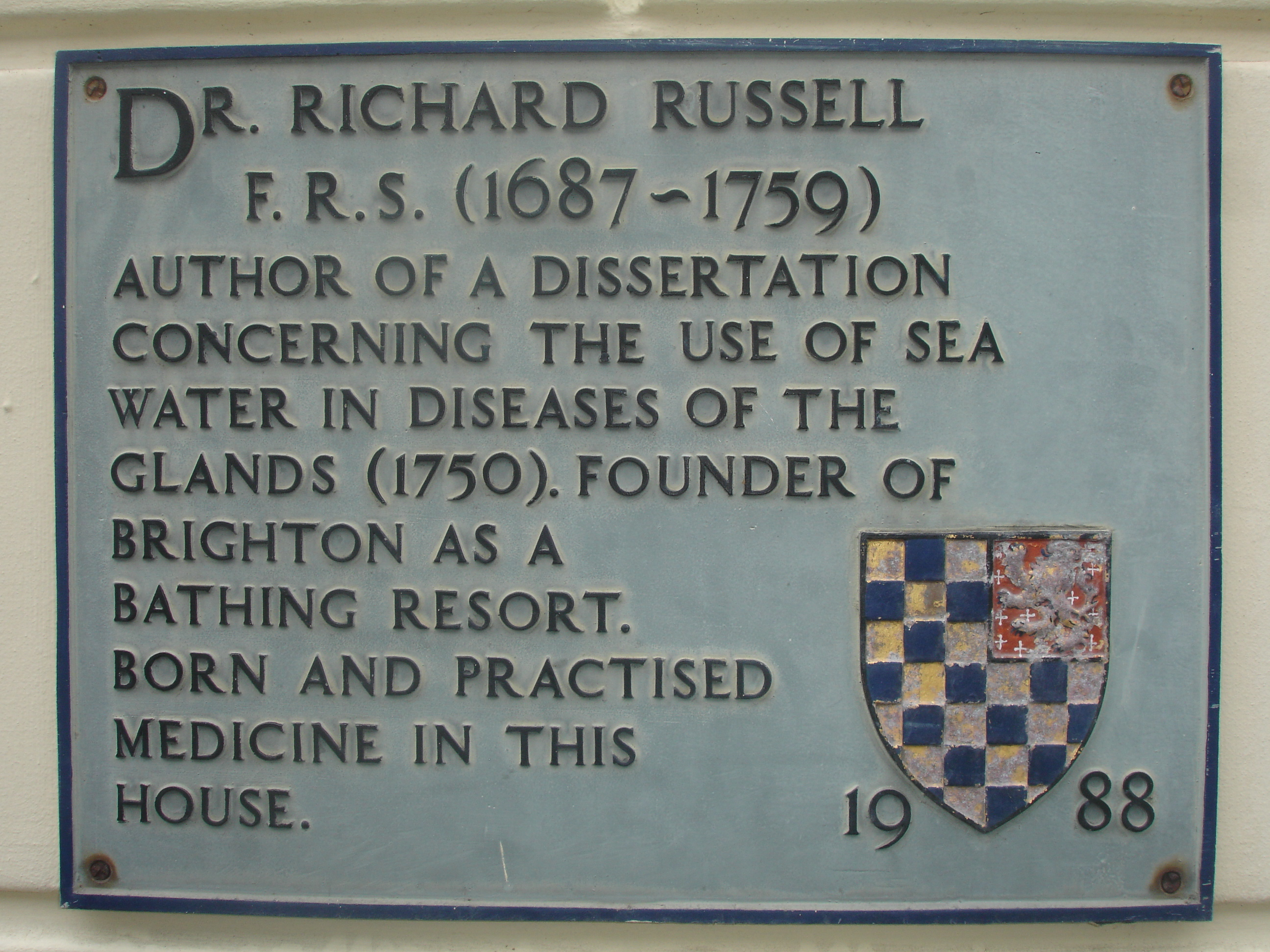
Plaque on Russell's house

Around 1747, Russell went to Brighton to exploit his theories on the medical properties of seawater. In 1750, he published a Latin dissertation De Tabe Glandulari, in which he recommended the use of seawater for the cure of enlarged lymphatic glands. This was translated into English in 1752 as Glandular Diseases, or a Dissertation on the Use of Sea Water in the Affections of the Glands by W. Owen in London, and in 1769 it reached a sixth edition. It was the first book to make a connection between drinking and bathing in seawater and improvements in health.

Russell recommended especially that people try the water near Brighton, proclaiming that seawater was superior to those cures provided by inland spas. His ideas were widely acclaimed in England and abroad, and despite dispute regarding the best ways to use seawater, "few disputed its value".

By 1753, his treatments became so popular that he moved his surgery to Brighton. He bought a plot of land at the south of Old Steine for £40 (£8,000 as of 2023). This land is where the Royal Albion Hotel now stands. It was in a sheltered, marshy area of common land. The red-brick, gabled structure was Brighton's largest house to date, and accommodated both patients and Russell himself. The rear opened directly out to the beach.

Russell's efforts have been credited with playing a role in the populist "sea side mania of the second half of the eighteenth century", although broader social movements were also at play. The plaque on the wall of the Royal Albion Hotel says simply: "If you seek his monument, look around". After Russell's death in 1759, his house was rented to seasonal visitors, including the brother of George III, the Duke of Cumberland in 1779. On 7 September 1783, the Prince Regent (then the Prince of Wales) visited his uncle. The Prince's subsequent patronage of the town for the next 40 years was central to its rapid growth and the transition of the fishing village of Brighthelmston to the modern city of Brighton.

Russell was elected a Fellow of the Royal Society in February 1752.

== Burial ==
Russell was buried at South Malling (St Michael), at the time a separate village near Lewes with a church dedicated to St Michael.

Russell's oldest son William was his heir. A condition of the inheritance was that he had to change his name to Kempe, that of his maternal grandfather, 'if he was to enjoy the estate settled on his mother'. This stipulation was made in his grandfather's will. The inheritance included about 1,300 acres of land in east Sussex. Russell's practice at Brighton passed to a Dr. Anthony Relhan.

== Sources ==
- Antram, Nicholas; Morrice, Richard (2008). Brighton and Hove. Pevsner Architectural Guides. London: Yale University Press. ISBN 978-0-300-12661-7.
- Carder, Timothy (1990). The Encyclopaedia of Brighton. Lewes: East Sussex County Libraries. ISBN 0-86147-315-9.
- Musgrave, Clifford (1981). Life in Brighton. Rochester: Rochester Press. ISBN 0-571-09285-3.
