= Royal Albion Hotel =

Hotel in Brighton, England

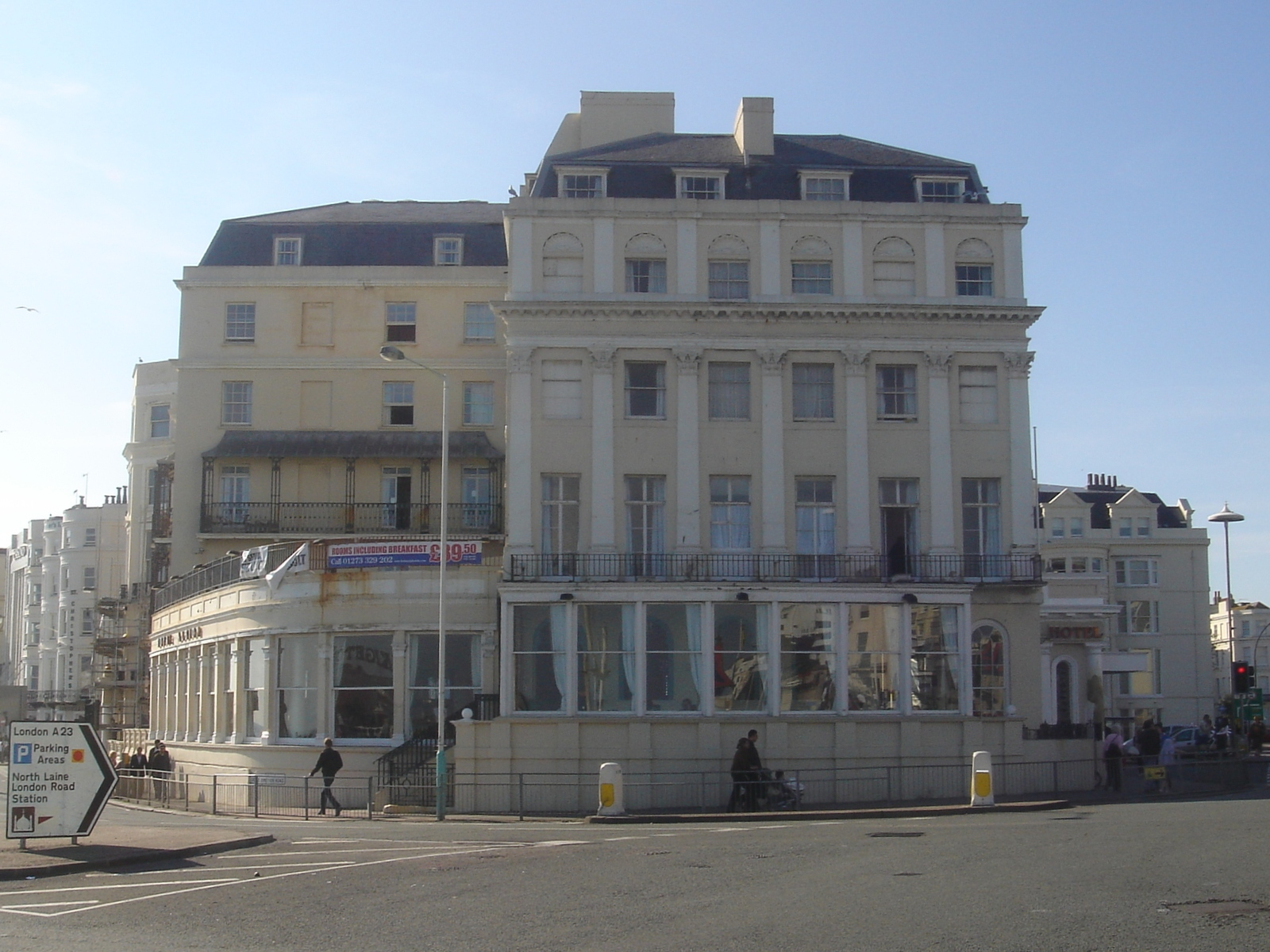
- The eastern façade of the hotel in 2009

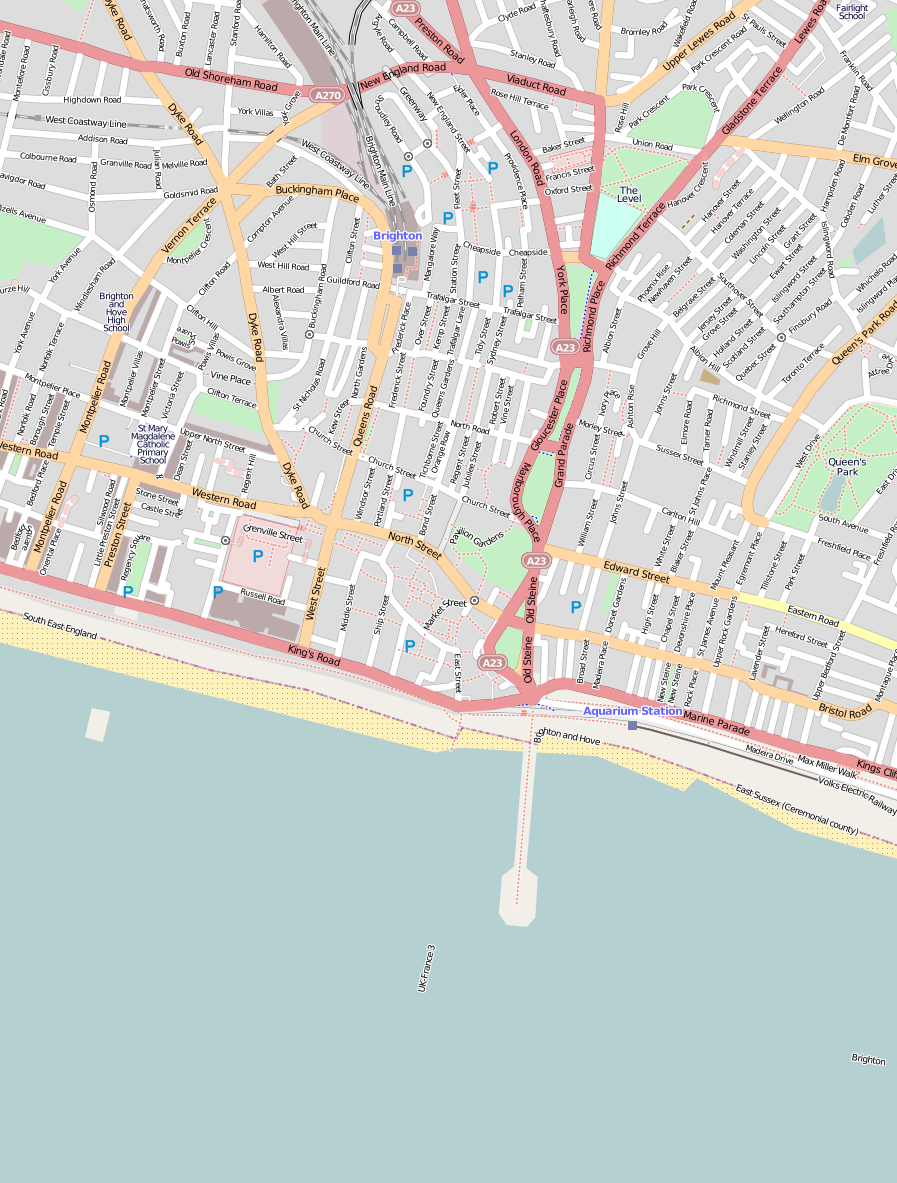
- Location of the hotel within central Brighton

General information
- Location: 35 Old Steine, Brighton, United Kingdom
- Coordinates: 50.8197°N 0.1373°W
- Opening: 5 August 1826
- Owner: Britannia Hotels Ltd
- Operator: Britannia Hotels

Technical details
- Floor count: 4

Design and construction
- Architect: Amon Henry Wilds
- Developer: John Colbatch

Other information
- Number of rooms: 195
- Number of restaurants: 1
- Parking: 0

Website
- www.britanniahotels.com/hotels/brighton/

The Royal Albion Hotel (originally the Albion Hotel) is a 3-star hotel, on the corner of Old Steine and Kings Road in Brighton, England. Built on the site of a house belonging to Richard Russell, a local doctor whose advocacy of sea-bathing and seawater drinking helped to make Brighton fashionable in the 18th century, it has been extended several times, although it experienced a period of rundown and closure in the early 20th century. A fire in 1998 caused serious damage, and the hotel was restored. However, another fire in 2023 seriously damaged the building to the extent that demolition of the western part of the building began on 19 July 2023.

The Classical-style building has three parts of different sizes and dates but similar appearances. Large pilasters and columns of various orders feature prominently. Amon Henry Wilds, an important and prolific local architect, took the original commission on behalf of promoter John Colbatch. Another local entrepreneur, Harry Preston, restored the hotel to its former high status after buying it in poor condition. The building took on its present three-wing form in 1963. The original part of the building was listed at Grade II* by English Heritage for its architectural and historical importance, and its western extension is listed separately at the lower Grade II.

== History ==
=== Beginnings ===
The site itself is connected with the life and career of Richard Russell, a doctor who advocated sea water as a cure of ailments. After Russell's death in 1759, Old Steine developed as the centre of fashionable life in Brighton. Russell House, as it became known, was used as lodgings for visitors such as the Duke of Cumberland, and later became an entertainment venue with activities such as a puppet theatre, a camera obscura and resident jugglers.

In the 1820s, it passed to entrepreneur John Colbatch, who demolished it in 1823. The local authorities tried to arrange for the land to be kept as open space, but negotiations collapsed and Colbatch began planning the construction of a hotel.

=== Construction, success, disrepair ===
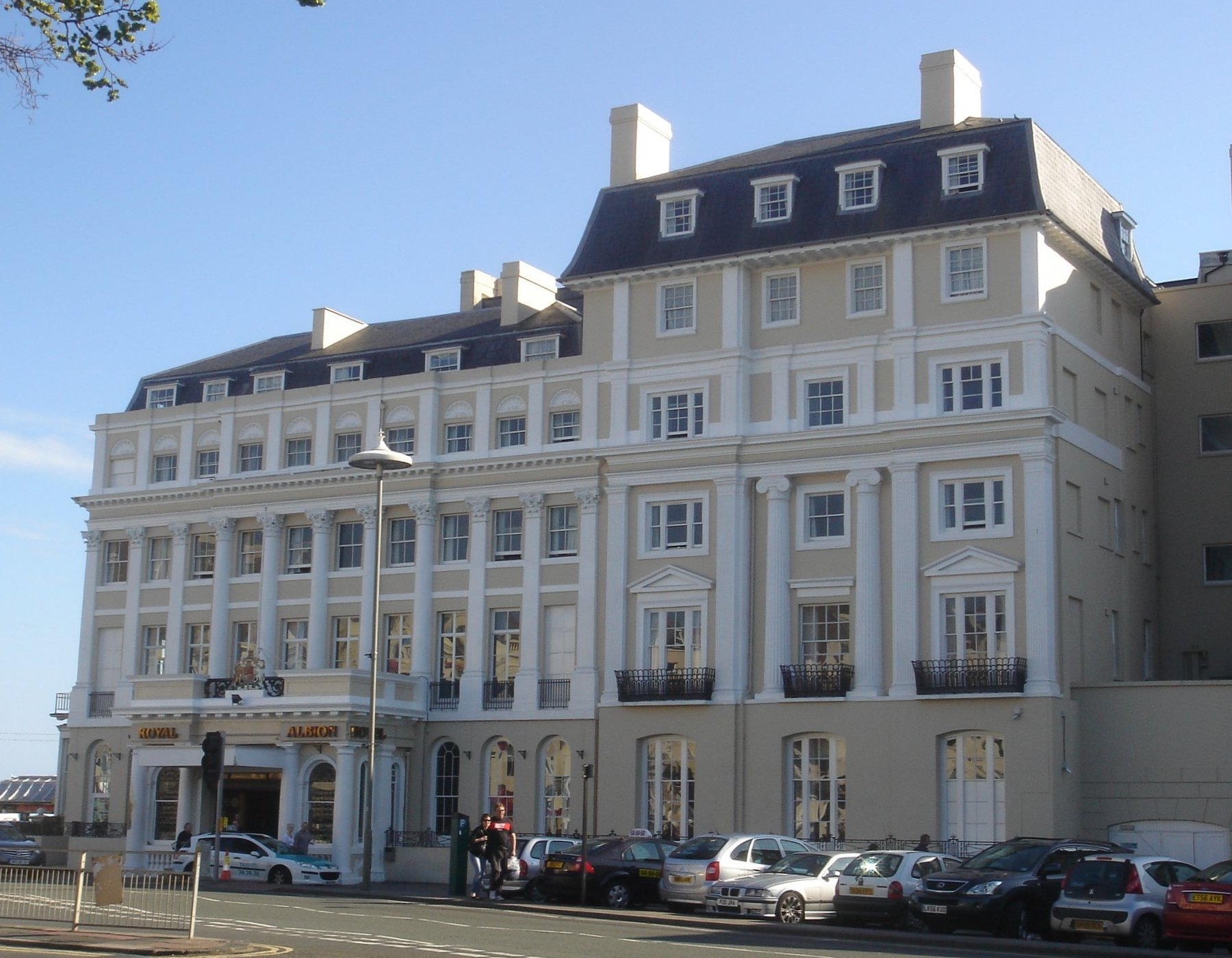
The eastern section of 1826 (left) and its adjoining extension of the 1840s (right)

Colbatch commissioned young architect Amon Henry Wilds, who began planning the hotel in 1822. Wilds, the son of Amon Wilds and an associate of Charles Busby, had been responsible for many building schemes in Brighton from about 1815, when he and his father moved their architectural practice to Brighton. Schemes already completed by 1822 included King's Road and Brighton Unitarian Church. The hotel was built on a corner site at the point where Old Steine met King's Road, and like Russell House the main façade faced away from the sea, towards Old Steine. The four-storey structure opened on 5 August 1826.

The venture was immediately successful, and a stylistically similar five-storey extension was added to the west in about 1847. At the same time, the name was changed from the Albion Hotel. Six years earlier, one of Brighton's most important cultural establishments was established in a ground-floor room: the Albion Rooms Literary and Scientific Institution combined the functions of library, lecture theatre and museum. The venture eventually became unsustainable, and the institution's members presented the accumulated books, artefacts and pictures to Brighton Corporation, the local authority. This led to the establishment of the Brighton Museum and Art Gallery and Brighton Library in the grounds of the Royal Pavilion.

The hotel fell into disrepair in the late 19th century, and was closed in 1900. Harry Preston, owner of the nearby Royal York Hotel, bought it in 1913 for £13,500 (£1,347,000 in 2025), and quickly restored its fashionable reputation. The building was completely refurbished, additions were made, and well-known literary figures, artists and entertainers regularly stayed. The extensions carried out around this time, in the Edwardian style typical of the period, included a sea-facing lounge at the rear of the hotel, and were carried out by Brighton architectural firm Clayton & Black. Started in the 1870s by Charles Clayton and Ernest Black and continued by their sons, this firm was one of Brighton's most prolific designers of public buildings and churches over the next 60 years.

In 1856, another hotel had been built west of the Royal Albion on land previously occupied by Williams's Royal Hot and Cold Baths, an indoor bath-house. The Lion Mansion Hotel was architecturally similar to the Royal Albion, and rose to four storeys. It was later known as the Adelphi Hotel. In 1963, it was taken over by the Royal Albion, and became physically linked to it as a west wing.

=== 1998 fire ===
On the morning of 24 November 1998, the hotel was devastated by a fire which started in the kitchen. A chef was frying eggs and sausages in a pan; hot fat spilt and caught light, and flames were immediately sucked up a vent to the top floor. The fire spread quickly, assisted by strong winds, and all 160 people in the building were evacuated. The Public and Commercial Services Union had to cancel their annual conference, due to be held that day, because of the disruption caused to its delegates, most of whom were staying at the hotel. About 160 firefighters from all parts of East and West Sussex attended the fire from about 8:20am until late in the evening, in what was later described as Brighton's "biggest firefighting operation for nearly 30 years". All parts of the hotel were affected by smoke, water and structural damage, but the original corner building was particularly badly affected.

=== 2023 fire ===
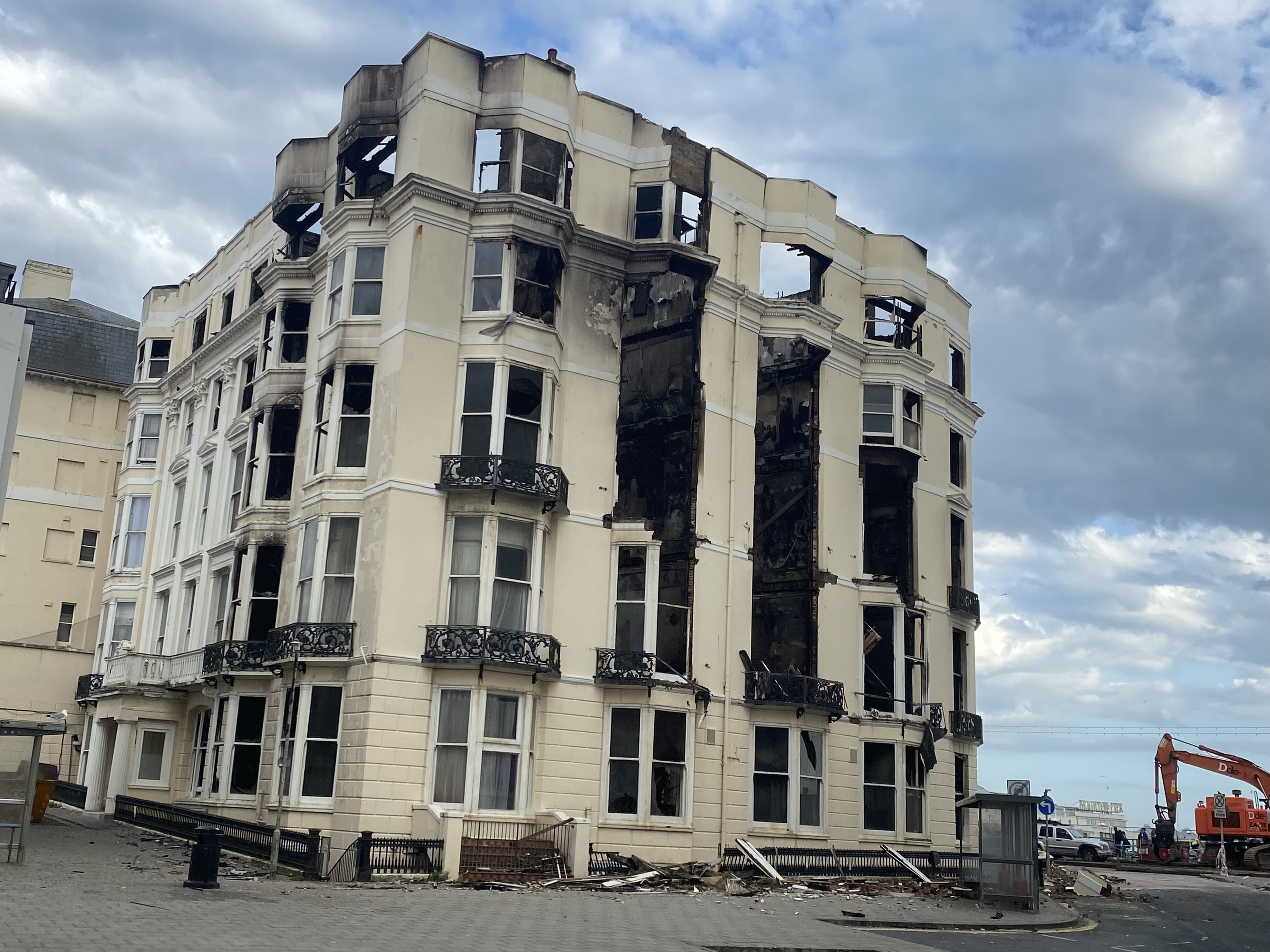
The hotel's west façade on 19 July 2023

On 15 July 2023, a fire broke out on the fourth floor of the hotel's western side. The East Sussex Fire and Rescue Service (ESFRS) arrived at the scene at 5:24 p.m. due to reports of smoke. The Old Steine and interlinking roads were closed with local bus services diverted as smoke filled the area. By 7:02 p.m. people were being advised to stay away due to health concerns and over fears that the building would collapse. Part of the roof collapsed at 8:30 p.m. The fire continued to burn throughout the night and had reached the ground floor by 1:10 p.m. the next day. Concerns over asbestos being released were raised as the hotel collapsed. The Old Steine was reopened at 5:40 p.m. on 17 July as demolition crews arrived, however they were stopped due to complaints from a heritage group about preserving the Grade II listed façade. The effects of the large amounts of smoke from the blaze were worsened by wind as around 100 people in the surrounding area were evacuated. One resident described how their home was "covered in soot and smoke damage" and said that their kitten had to be put on oxygen due to smoke inhalation. At its height, 15 fire engines were at the scene. The only injury from the fire was smoke in a person's eyes.

Demolition of the gutted western side began on 19 July, but stopped two days later when more smoke was seen. The A259 road, which runs in front of the hotel, was closed during the demolition: the westbound carriageway reopened on 3 August, however the eastbound carriageway remained closed until 26 August.

In October 2023, following an investigation by the ESFRS, the cause of the fire was determined to likely be a discarded cigarette. In August 2024 it was revealed that the hotel had passed a fire safety audit in September 2022, which noted the site's "preventative and protective measures" and "effective emergency plan and policy", with staff praised for their "professional and pro-active attitude towards their fire safety responsibilities". A report on the blaze said that its fast spread was due to hidden voids, lath and plaster construction of walls, aged and dry timber in the window frames and wind direction and speed.

On 21 February 2025, part of the A259 was closed as an engineer reported that the hotel and its scaffolding were "at risk of catastrophic failure".

== Architecture ==
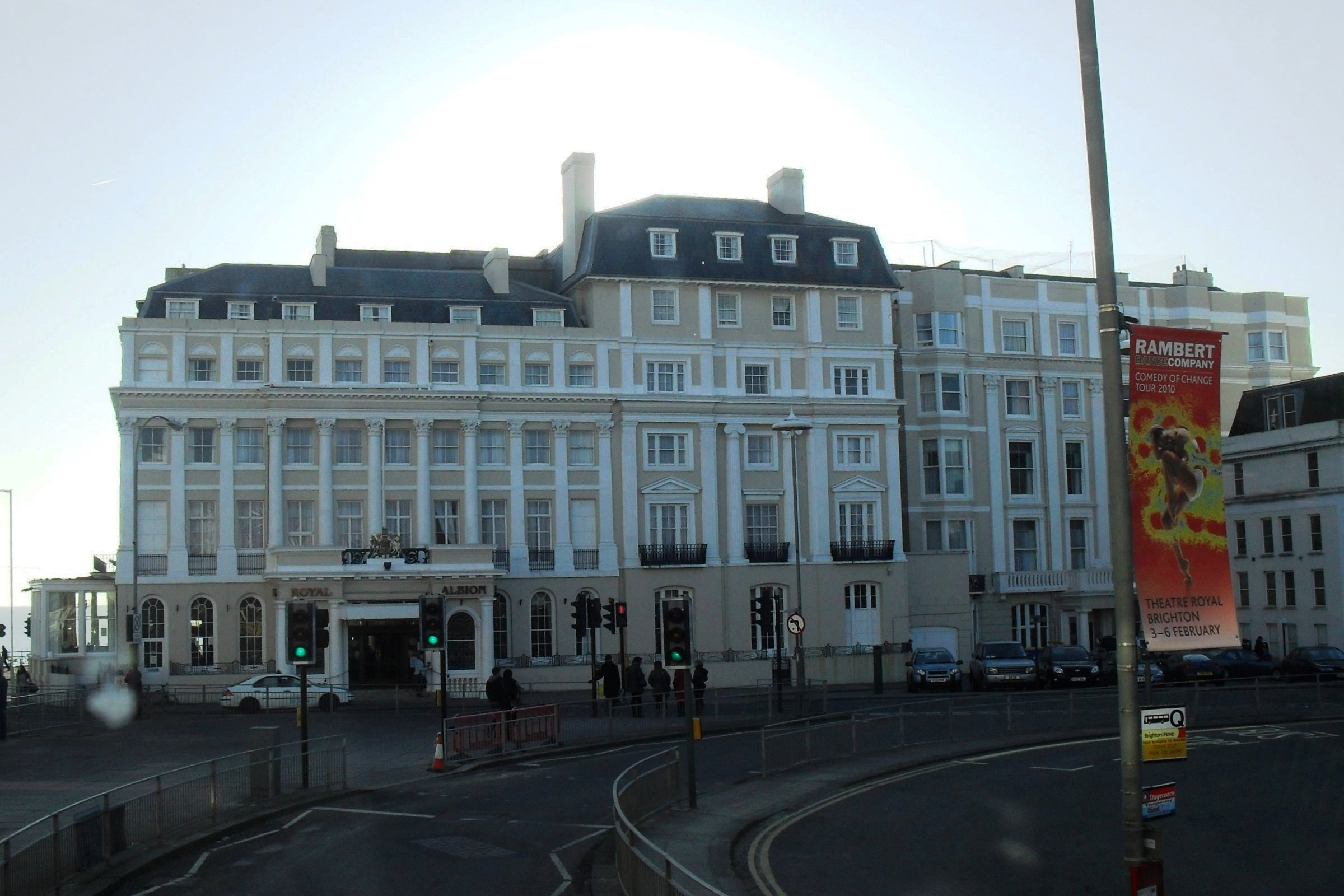
The three parts of the hotel, looking south. From left to right: Amon Henry Wilds's 1826 building; the 1840s extension; and the former Lion Mansions Hotel (partly obscured).

In its most recent form, the Royal Albion Hotel is in three linked sections, all stylistically similar. The original (eastern) wing is four storeys tall and has five extremely large Corinthian and Composite columns on the north face. These are flanked on both sides by large pilasters, which also run all round the east face. The top floor is an attic storey displaying Wilds's characteristic motif: shell designs set in blank rounded tympana. Above this is a mansard roof, now mostly obscured. The centre section, dating from about 1847, has three full storeys and two attic floors above, and is therefore taller. The façade has three bays. The theme of large pilasters and columns continues, but different styles are used: the left and right bays project slightly and have paired Tuscan pilasters, and a pair of tapering Ionic columns in the centre bay form a distyle in antis composition. The centre section also has a mansard roof—apparently a later addition. The western wing (the former Lion Mansions) has a Tuscan-columned porch on the south (seafront) side and a Doric-style equivalent facing north to Old Steine, four Composite pilasters extending for three of the four storeys, small cast-iron balconies and some aedicula-style window surrounds.

== Present day ==
The Royal Albion Hotel was listed at Grade II* on 13 October 1952. Such buildings are defined as being "particularly important ... [and] of more than special interest". In February 2001, it was one of 70 Grade II*-listed buildings and structures, and one of 1,218 listed buildings of all grades, in the city of Brighton and Hove. The west wing (the former Lion Mansions) was listed at Grade II on 5 August 1999. In February 2001, it was one of 1,124 buildings listed at that grade in Brighton and Hove; the status indicates that the building was considered "nationally important and of special interest".

The hotel is operated by Britannia Hotels. There were 208 guest rooms, one restaurant, two bars and five rooms for conferences and meetings. Bedrooms were classified in four grades, from standard to deluxe. It had a 3-star rating prior to the 2023 fire.

== Historical sketches and hotel guests ==
The Albion was subject of a sketch by painter J. M. W. Turner (1775–1851) in 1834 during one of his coastal expeditions. By 1847, due to its frequent patronage by a number of distinguished visitors, it had changed its name to the Royal Albion and the Royal coat of arms was duly placed over the entrance.

Angela Burdett-Coutts, 1st Baroness Burdett-Coutts (1814–1906), called "the richest heiress in England" by Thomas Raikes, a friend of Charles Dickens and the Duke of Wellington, would regularly spend part of the year in the Royal Albion Hotel with her long-term companion, Hannah Brown.

In February 1894, Oscar Wilde (1854–1900) stayed in a room overlooking the sea whilst working on his Poems in Prose, the collective title of six prose poems published in July that year in The Fortnightly Review.

In 1906, Harry Preston (1860–1936), a fifty-year-old charismatic local figure in Brighton and friend of the Prince of Wales, bought the hotel and four years later carried out large scale alterations creating a roof garden which overlooked the Palace Pier. In the new refurbished hotel, Arnold Bennett (1867–1931) began writing part of his Clayhanger trilogy while staying there in 1910. The same year, Frenchman André Beaumont (1880–1937), in his Blériot monoplane, flew around the skies of Brighton, taking Preston as a passenger. Afterwards, he hosted a banquet at the Royal Albion Hotel to celebrate the event. Preston, a former publican, had entered the hotel business around the turn of the century. Preston had a wonderful feel for publicity, and he wined and dined with the editors of the London newspapers, encouraging them to promote the town and his new hotel to visitors, especially motorists. Preston's wife Ellen died in 1913 and a year later he married Edith Collings, the Royal Albion's manageress. Preston was knighted for his services to charitable causes in 1933, and his wife, Edith, was presented at Court the following year.

In the spring of 1919, the hotel entertained three aristocratic guests—two of whom signed the hotel's register as Sir David and "Lady Dorothy" Dalrymple of Newhailes House. Away from the prying eyes of friends in London, the party-loving pair were enjoying an affair, but, unknown to them both, they were followed by an enquiry agent employed by Margaret, the "real" Lady Dalrymple, resulting in a divorce.

The hotel is listed in the 1966-1967 Travelers' Green Book as a safe hotel for African American travelers to the United Kingdom.

== Film location ==
- The hotel appears as the final location of the 1986 Neil Jordan film Mona Lisa, starring Bob Hoskins and Cathy Tyson.
- The hotel briefly appears in an episode of "Minder" starring George Cole and Dennis Waterman where George Cole's character Arthur Daley is thrown out of the Hotel Lobby by the Doorman.

== See also ==
- Grade II* listed buildings in Brighton and Hove
- Grade II listed buildings in Brighton and Hove: P–R
