= Britannia Adelphi Hotel =

Hotel in Liverpool city centre, England

Adelphi Hotel, Liverpool
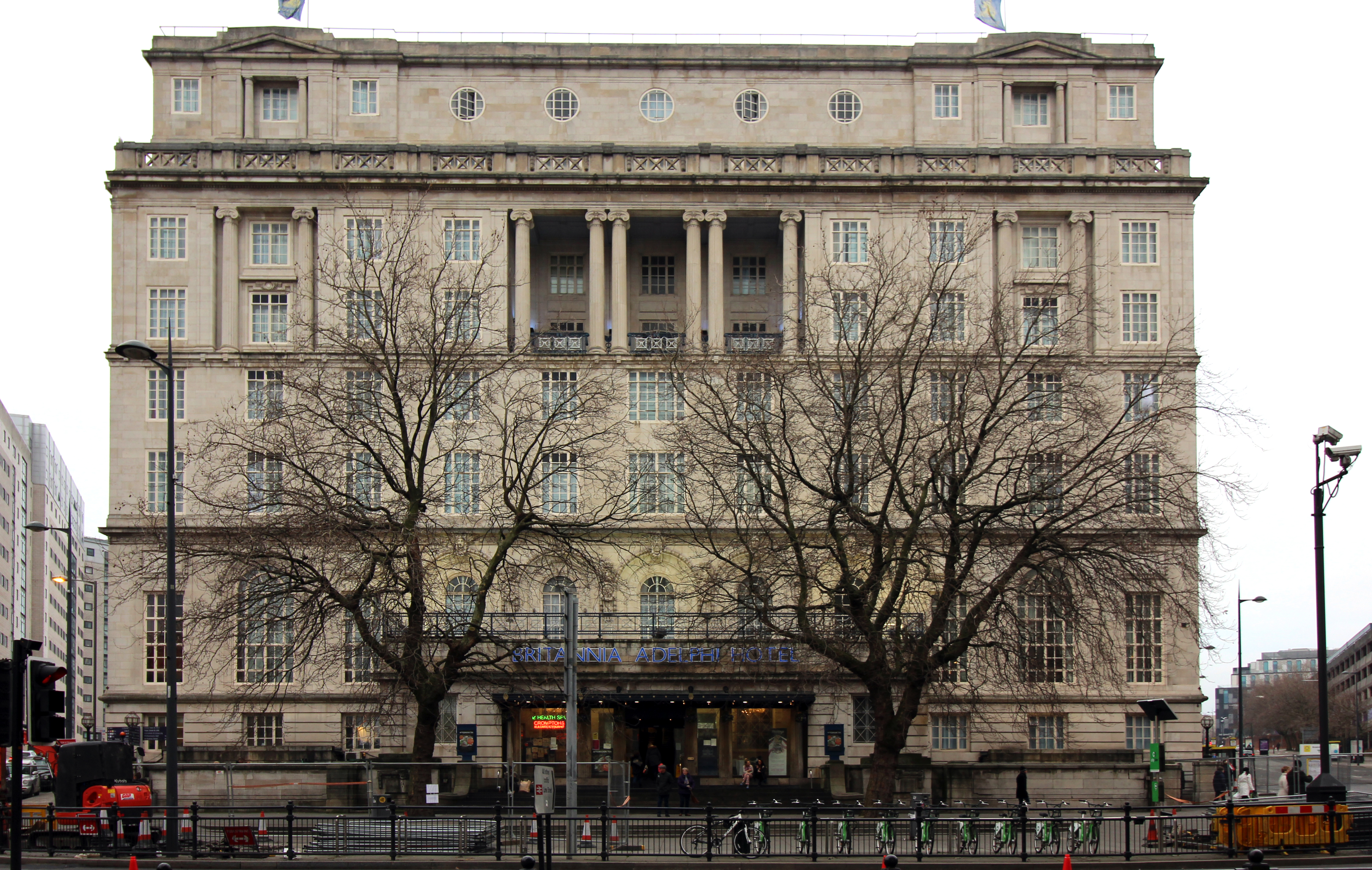
- Front of hotel in 2018

- Location within Merseyside

General information
- Location: Ranelagh Place, Liverpool, England
- Coordinates: 53.40549°N 2.97740°W
- Opening: 1914
- Owner: Britannia Hotels

Technical details
- Floor count: 6

Design and construction
- Architect: Frank Atkinson

Other information
- Number of rooms: 402 Bedrooms
- Number of restaurants: 3

Website
- Visit website

The Britannia Adelphi Hotel is in Ranelagh Place, Liverpool city centre, Merseyside, England. The present building is the third hotel on the site, and is recorded in the National Heritage List for England as a designated Grade II listed building. The building is owned and managed by Britannia Hotels. It contains 402 en-suite bedrooms, conference and dining facilities, and a gymnasium.

== History ==
=== 1826–1983: Foundation and ownership by railway companies ===
The first hotel on the site was built in 1826 for the hotelier James Radley by the conversion of two 18th-century town houses. It was built on the site of the former Ranelagh Gardens, the first open space for public recreation in Liverpool.

This hotel was replaced by another hotel in 1876, which was bought in 1892 by the Midland Railway, being renamed the Midland Adelphi. A feature was a basement set of heated tanks to keep live turtles for turtle soup which was not only served, but the basis of a significant business being sent to banquets etc. around the country and beyond. The railway company replaced it between 1911 and 1914 with the present building, designed by Frank Atkinson. When opened, it was "regarded as the most luxurious hotel outside London".

Owing to Liverpool being a major arrival and departure point for ocean liners during the early 20th century, the Adelphi served as the most popular hotel in the city for wealthy passengers before they embarked on their journey to North America. The RMS Titanic was registered in Liverpool (though it never visited the port), and the Sefton Suite is said to be an exact replica of the ill-fated liner's First Class Smoking Lounge.

On 1 January 1948, Britain's railway companies were nationalised and the Adelphi Hotel became part of British Transport Hotels, a subsidiary of British Rail.

Guests at the hotel from this period included world leaders, such as Franklin D. Roosevelt and Winston Churchill; as well as music artists like Frank Sinatra, Laurel and Hardy, Judy Garland, Bob Dylan, and Roy Rogers.

=== 1983–present: Sale to Britannia Hotels ===
Following the Conservative Party's victory in the 1979 general election, British Rail was ordered to dispose of unnecessary assets. In 1983, as part of the sale of British Transport Hotels, the hotel was sold by British Rail to the hotel group Britannia Hotels.

In 2006, the Adelphi Hotel was investigated by the BBC over ongoing theft and hygiene issues. In November 2010, following a food hygiene inspection from Liverpool City Council, the hotel received a zero in its food hygiene rating (the lowest score possible) and was ordered to remedy its practices. It was handed a fourth consecutive zero in its food hygiene rating after an inspection in January 2016, and in June 2017 Britannia Hotels admitted in Liverpool Magistrates' Court to seven breaches of health and safety law and were fined £265,000.

On 30 August 2006 a 25-year-old man drowned in the swimming pool of the Adelphi after the lifeguard on duty left his post. The man had been dead for thirty minutes when he was found. In May 2010, Britannia Hotels was charged with several breaches of health and safety laws in relation to the death.

A November 2015 investigation by the Liverpool Echo found broken and condensation-stained windows, damp-covered walls and windowsills, dirty rooms and bathrooms, and broken furniture.

On 10 September 2022, a wardrobe in the Adelphi fell on a 21-year-old woman and crushed her to death. The Adelphi is currently under investigation from Liverpool City Council following the incident. On 4 October, the Liverpool Echo revealed that the hotel is also under investigation for an incident that occurred earlier in 2022 in which a guest was injured. The following day Kim Johnson, the Member of Parliament for Liverpool Riverside (the constituency in which the hotel is based), urged Britannia Hotels to 'sell up and move on', describing the hotel as 'a blight on [Liverpool]'.

== Architecture ==
=== Exterior ===
The Britannia Adelphi Liverpool is constructed in Portland stone. It has seven floors, and its entrance front contains eleven bays. The central three bays of the ground floor comprise the entrance, which is enhanced by columns. The windows on the first floor are round-headed; the rest of the windows are rectangular. In the central three bays of the fourth and fifth floors is a recessed balcony with Ionic columns. There are similar columns on these floors in the second and tenth bays. Above the sixth floor is a cornice with a balustrade.

=== Interior ===
The public rooms contain columns, marble panelling, and coffered arches. The Central Court is top-lit, and contains pink marble pilasters, glazed screens, and French doors opening into restaurants on its sides. Beyond this is the Hypostyle Hall, containing Empire-style decoration and four Ionic columns. Beyond this is the Fountain Court.

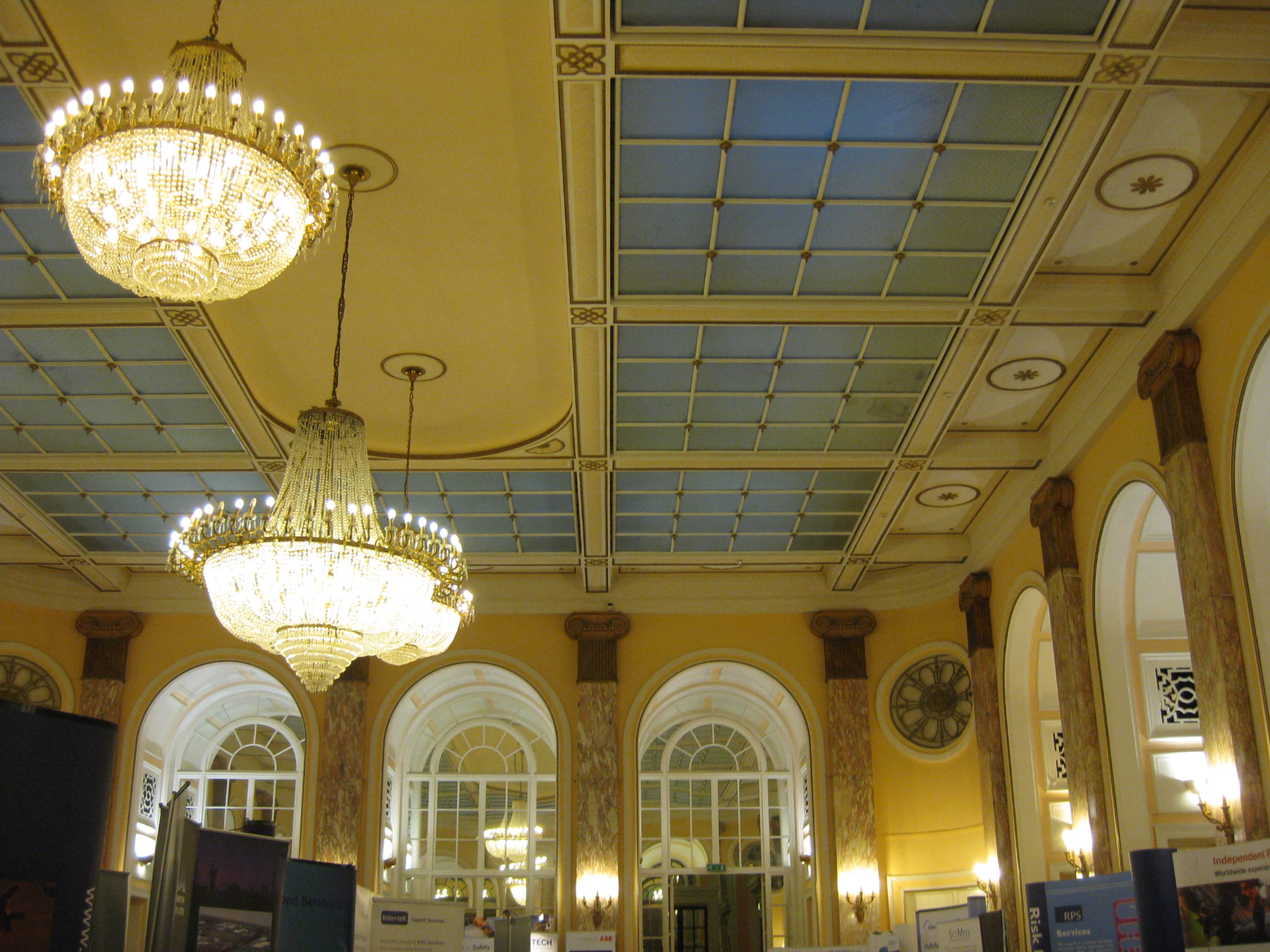
Hall

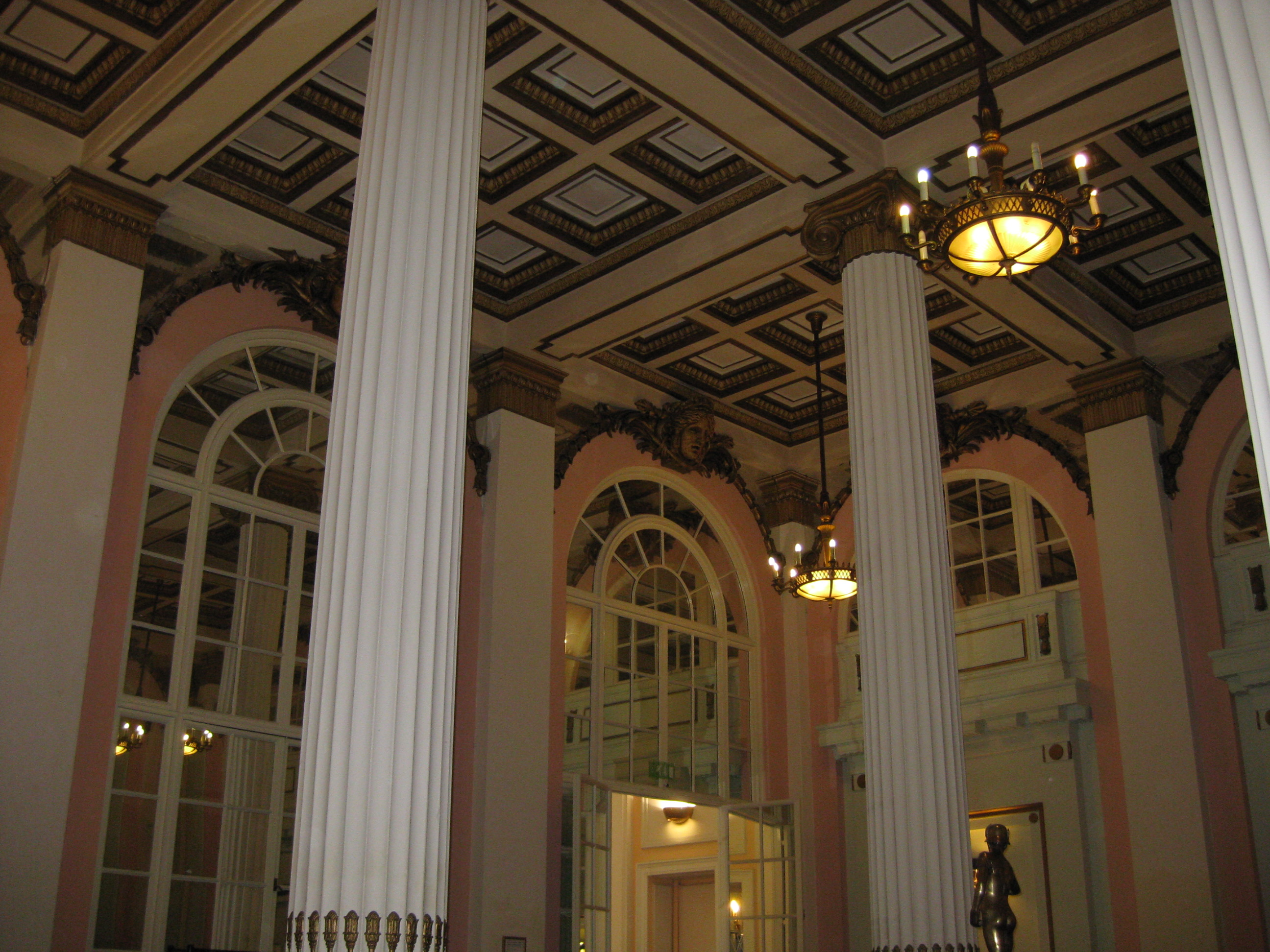
Hypostyle Hall

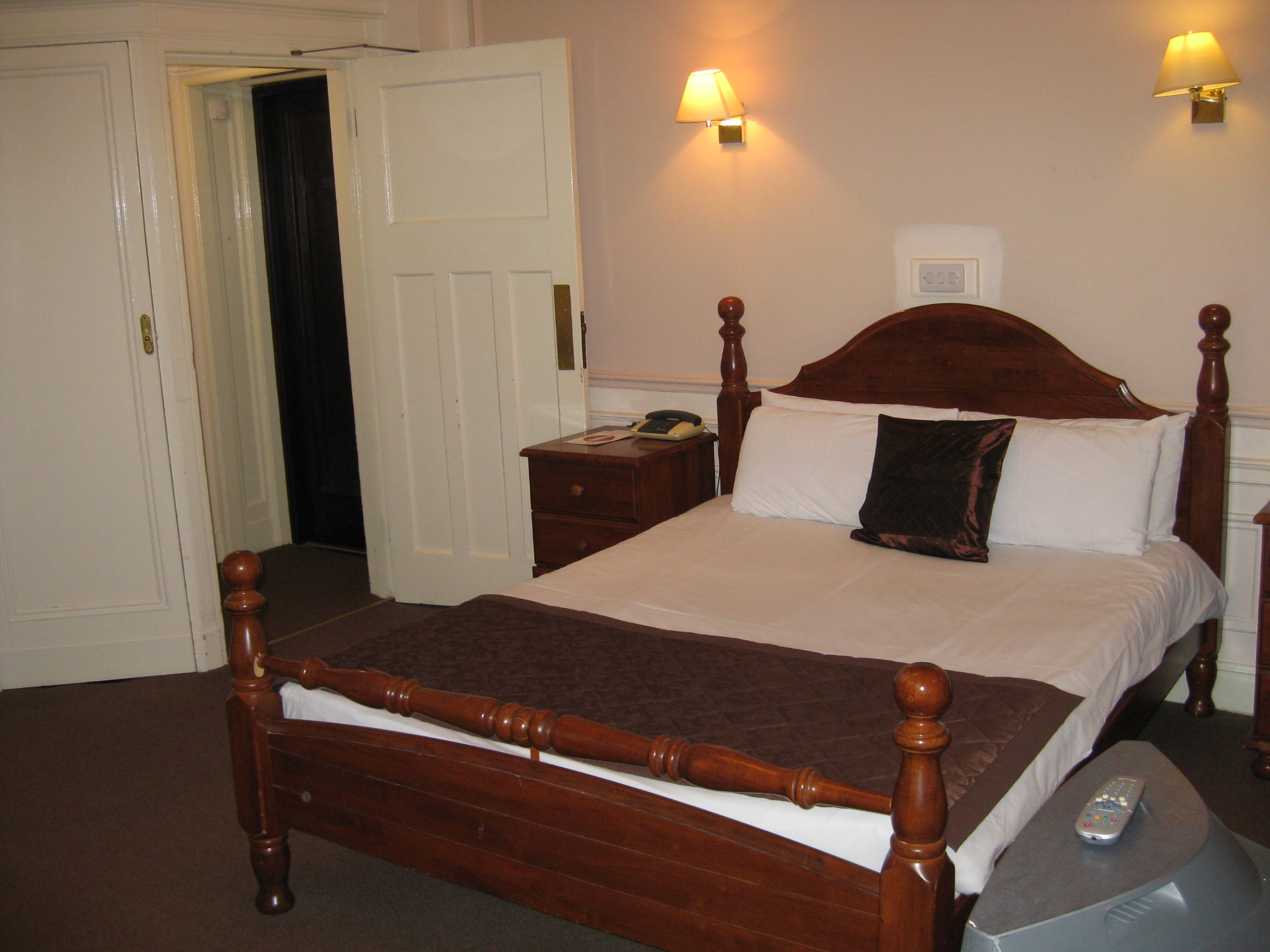
A double bedroom

== Adelphi Hotel in media ==
In Jules Verne's 1870 novel Twenty Thousand Leagues Under the Seas Chapter 1.8, Professor Aronnax describes the interior of the submarine as similar to the Adelphi Hotel.

The lounge was used in the 1981 TV series Brideshead Revisited as the interior of an ocean liner.

In 1997 the hotel was used in the filming of The Lakes, in which the protagonist used the hotel toilets to steal from the guests.

In 1997, the hotel was the subject of an eight-part BBC documentary series, Hotel. This fly-on-the-wall documentary enabled viewers to look behind the scenes at the everyday running of the hotel. The series was voiced over by Andrew Sachs who played Manuel in Fawlty Towers.

The hotel features briefly in the Bob Dylan documentary Don't Look Back as Dylan appears on the balcony of his room to wave to his fans below.

== See also ==
- Grade II listed buildings in Liverpool-L1
