= Grand Hotel (Llandudno) =

Hotel in Llandudno, Wales

Coordinates: 53.328°N 3.829°W

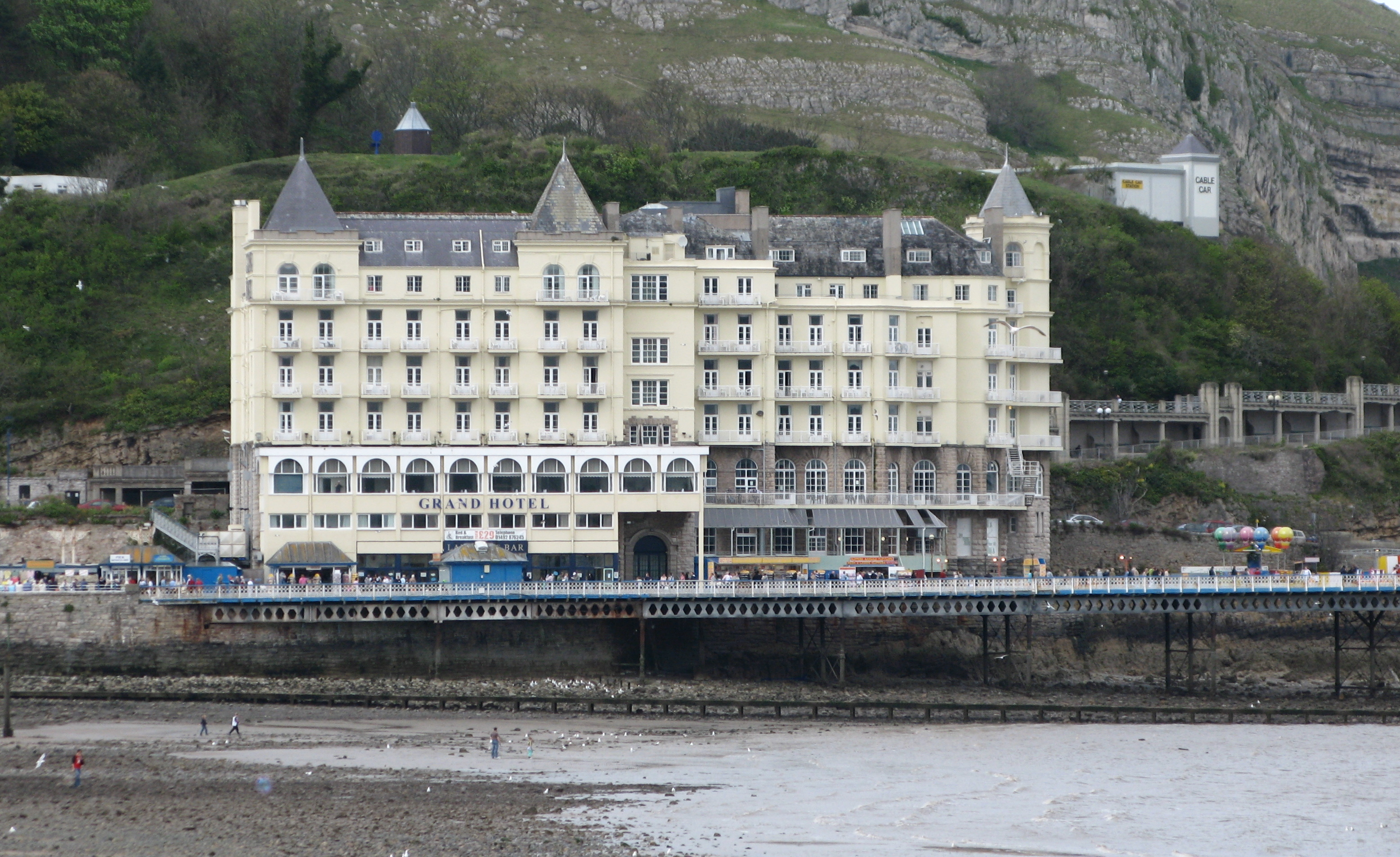
The Grand Hotel at Llandudno

The Grand Hotel is a large hotel in Llandudno, Wales, overlooking the Promenade on the North Shore. It is owned by Britannia Hotels.

== History ==
The history of the Grand Hotel began with the construction of the bathhouse in 1855. In 1858 the Pier was opened below the bathhouse. However, this was severely damaged in the Royal Charter Storm of 25 October 1859, which caused the loss of 223 ships and 800 people in British coastal waters. Although repaired and used for a further 16 years, the pier was eventually replaced in 1876. At that time the bathhouse complex was extended with the construction of the Bath's Hotel, the forerunner of the Grand Hotel.

In 1886 the neighbouring Llandudno Pier Pavilion Theatre was opened. In 1901 the Hotel and Bathhouse underwent a substantial reconstruction to a design by James Francis Doyle it reopened as the Grand Hotel in 1902.

The new hotel was the largest in Wales in its day with 158 rooms. Today the hotel has 162 rooms, two restaurants, a bar and a ballroom.

In 1981 the hotel was acquired by Butlins who ran it in an "Adult Entertainment" style along with their other hotels. In 1998 Butlins sold off its hotels to Grand Hotels Ltd. and, in 2004, ownership transferred to Britannia Hotels when 3 former Butlins hotels were sold off by Grand.

== Media Appearances ==
The hotel appeared in the 1979 film Yanks.
