= Grand Hotel, Scarborough =

Hotel in Scarborough, North Yorkshire, England

Britannia Grand Hotel
- The Grand Hotel, Scarborough
- Former names: The Grand Hotel; Cliff Hotel

General information
- Architectural style: Baroque
- Location: St Nicholas Cliff, Scarborough, North Yorkshire, England
- Coordinates: 54.280493°N 0.398233°W
- Construction started: 1863
- Completed: 1867; 159 years ago
- Renovated: 1978
- Cost: £100,000 (1867)
- Owner: Britannia Hotels

Height
- Height: 121 feet (37 m)

Technical details
- Floor count: 4 + eaves level + 2 attic storeys + 3 basements

Design and construction
- Architect: Cuthbert Brodrick
- Designations: Grade II* Listed

Other information
- Number of rooms: 413

Website
- www.britanniahotels.com/hotels/the-grand-hotel-scarborough/

The Grand Hotel is a large hotel in Scarborough, North Yorkshire, England, overlooking the town's South Bay. It is a Grade II* listed building and is owned by Britannia Hotels. At the time of its grand opening in 1867, it was the largest hotel and the largest brick structure in Europe.

== Design ==
Detail of one of the hotel's four towers

The hotel was designed by the Hull architect Cuthbert Brodrick, who was better known as the designer of several Leeds buildings, and when completed in 1867 was one of the largest hotels in the world, as well as one of the first giant purpose-built hotels in Europe. The hotel's yellow (also referred to as tawny) brickwork was made locally in Hunmanby and is complemented with traditional red brickwork around the windows. The architectural sculpture was executed by Burstall and Taylor of Leeds.

The building is designed around the theme of time: four towers to represent the seasons, 12 floors for the months of the year, 52 chimneys symbolise the weeks, and originally there were 365 bedrooms, one for each day of a non-leap year. Following the renovation the room count was reduced to 280. The hotel itself is in the shape of a 'V' in honour of Queen Victoria. The hotel's peak was arguably during Victorian times, when wealthy holidaymakers made up the establishment's clientele. As Scarborough was a spa town, the building's baths originally included an extra pair of taps, so guests could wash in seawater as well as fresh.

Main entrance

The design has similarities to contemporaries of the period that were stylised as "French Second Empire mode". The windows on the ground and first floors are round headed. Those on the first floor also have a continuous iron rail balcony. All first to third floor windows have a cornice over the top denoting the floor boundary. The eaves level windows are located between the projecting brackets for the eaves. The attic windows are squared dormer on the lower level and rounded on the upper. The attic levels, being part of the roof are covered in slate. On the narrow end of the building there is domed structure between the two towers. Facing the sea, the three basement levels can be seen clearly extended the full length of the building. A glass-enclosed terrace has been added on top of this. The building was first listed on 8 June 1973 with number 1243163 under the Planning (Listed Buildings and Conservation Areas) Act 1990 as amended for its special architectural or historic interest.

== History ==
Construction began in 1863 and was completed in 1867, at a cost of over £100,000. At the time, it was the largest brick building in Europe. The first manager was M. Augustus Fricour, who had previously been in charge at the Hotel Mirabeau in Paris. The grand opening was on 24 July 1867.

From 1887, the hotel forged a link with the local annual cricket festival (Scarborough Festival), and allowed guests attending the exclusive use of the old dining room. The connection was extended to the cricket ground in the late 1940s, when staff from the hotel would serve food and drink to the players.

The hotel was badly damaged on 16 December 1914, during a raid on the town by the German Navy. The bombardment, by the battlecruisers Derfflinger and Von der Tann, accompanied by the light cruiser Kolberg, began soon after 8 a.m. and it was reported that the hotel was hit at least 30 times.

In 1939, the hotel became the home to RAF trainees and the corner cupolas housed anti-aircraft guns. Following the Iranian Embassy siege in 1980, the hotel was used in a covert training exercise by the SAS in preparation for other anticipated terrorist incidents.

The hotel now caters towards the budget end of the spectrum. The hotel was bought by Butlins, the company better known for its holiday camps, in 1978 and was run as an inexpensive choice of accommodation. In November 2004, the hotel was purchased by Britannia from Grand Leisure Group.

The hotel in 2026

=== Incidents ===
During the first decade of the 21st century, the hotel suffered multiple health and safety issues. Several cases of sickness had been reported in the mid-1990s under its previous ownership, and in 2002, an outbreak of gastroenteritis hospitalised one man and affected more than 200 guests and staff. A month later, 54 people fell ill, leading to ten days' closure to carry out cleaning. In October 2004, guests were quarantined in their rooms because of reports of sickness. In December, the hotel shut for ten days after an outbreak of the Norwalk virus (norovirus) that closed the establishment for several days, although no one required hospital treatment. A spokesperson for the North Yorkshire Health Protection Unit blamed the incidents on the age of the building and "bad luck".

In 2006, the hotel was fined £10,000 after a guest drank water that contained dangerous levels of bleach. In June 2011, 70 guests were affected by an outbreak of vomiting and diarrhoea. The cause was suspected but not confirmed to have been a viral gastrointestinal infection. In March 2007, 120 people fell ill with norovirus; infection control specialists stressed that the management should not be held responsible, as similar outbreaks are commonplace elsewhere. In 2005, an investigative BBC report revealed several health issues at the hotel, including the presence of E. coli bacteria. This report was branded "sensationalist" by Scarborough council's environmental health officer.

In May 2006, a fire broke out on the sixth floor of the building, possibly caused by renovation work. The hotel was quickly evacuated while local fire crews dealt with what they described as "quite a severe fire". Extinguishing the blaze took over 40 minutes because of the number of stairs in the building and the amount of smoke, which both hampered firefighters' movements.

Following articles published by Yorkshire Live in December 2020 and June 2021, claiming that conditions in the hotel had deteriorated, the Sunday Times also reported on the poor state of the hotel. Similar reports were made about other Britannia-owned hotels; Britannia had been voted Britain's worst hotel chain by Which? surveys of guests for the eight years up to 2020. On 5 October 2021, the hotel was evacuated in response to a hoax bomb threat.

== Recognition ==
In 2017, the Grand was listed among Historic Britain's top 10 places, buildings and historical sites that tell the "remarkable story of England and its impact on the world".

== Cultural references ==
Osbert Sitwell's novel Before the Bombardment (1926), is based on the hotel.

The 2019 film Scarborough, a story about two teachers who stay at the hotel with their pupils in a romantic setting, was filmed at the hotel during 2017.

== Notable guests ==
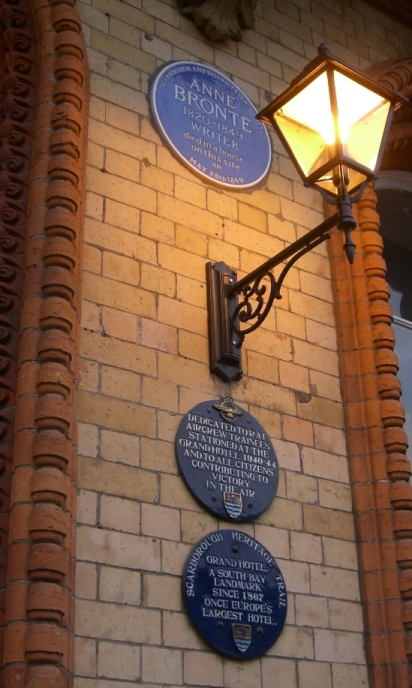
The hotel's blue plaques

The hotel has three blue plaques. One notes that Anne Brontë, the Yorkshire writer, died at lodgings on the site of the current hotel. Another mentions that the RAF trainees during the Second World War were stationed there. A third commemorates the opening of the building.

Winston Churchill stayed in the hotel during a Conservative Party Conference.

== See also ==
- Grade II* listed buildings in North Yorkshire (district)
- Listed buildings in Scarborough (Castle Ward)
