= Canterbury Law Courts =

Judicial building in Canterbury, England

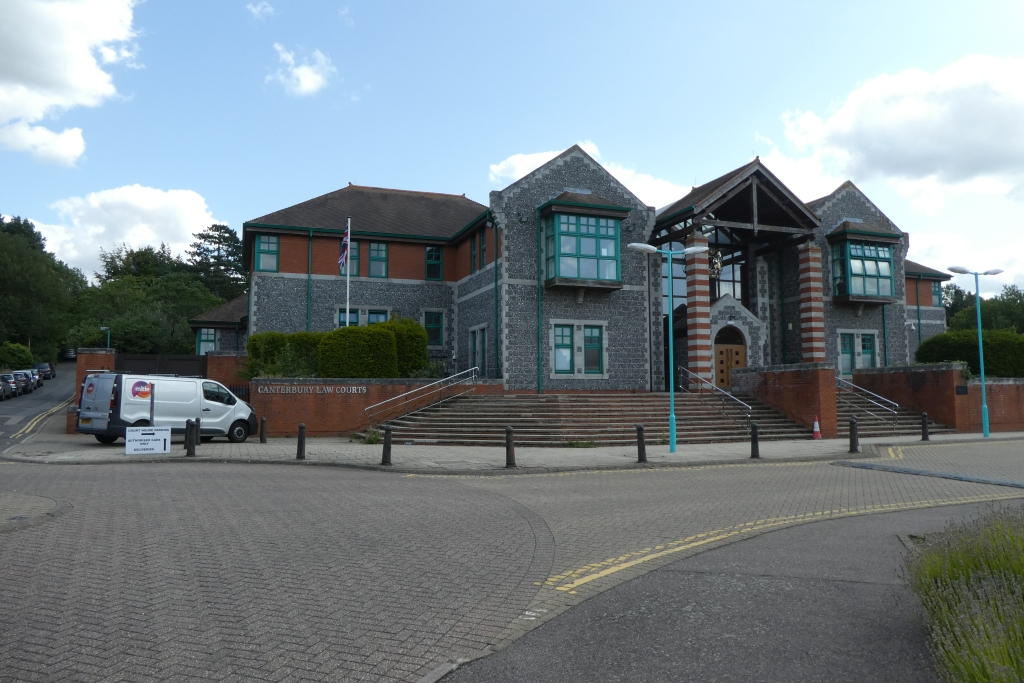
- Canterbury Law Courts

- Shown in Kent
- 51.2821°N 1.0948°E
- Location: Chaucer Road, Canterbury

History
- Built: 1995

Site notes
- Architect: Property Services Agency
- Architectural style: Modernist style

Canterbury Law Courts, also known as Canterbury Combined Court Centre, is a Crown Court venue, which deals with criminal cases, as well as a County Court venue, which deals with civil cases, in Chaucer Road, Canterbury, England.

== History ==
Historically, the quarter sessions in Canterbury had been held in the Guildhall, and it was not until 1971 that a dedicated magistrates' court complex was established in Broad Street for criminal trials. However, as the number of court cases in Canterbury grew, it became necessary to commission additional courthouse facilities to accommodate the crown court and the county court. The site selected by the Lord Chancellor's Department, on the south side of Chaucer Road, had been occupied by a military hospital, which had been re-purposed as military accommodation known as "Chaucer Barracks" by the time of the Second World War. The proposed courthouse formed part of a broader plan by Canterbury City Council to regenerate the former military site by establishing public offices there.

The new building was designed by the Property Services Agency in a postmodern style, built in grey flint brick and was officially opened by the Duke of Kent in July 1995. The design involved a symmetrical main frontage of five bays facing onto Chaucer Road. The central section of three bays, which was projected forward, featured a small gabled porch leading to a full height glass atrium. There was a Royal coat of arms fixed to the glass at first floor level. The central bay was flanked by a pair of square columns supporting a wooden canopy, which was projected forward. The outer bays of the central section, which were gabled, were fenestrated by pairs of casement windows on the ground floor and by oriel windows on the first floor. Internally, the building was laid out to accommodate ten courtrooms.

Notable cases have included the trial and conviction of Callum Wheeler, in July 2022, for the murder of the police community support officer, Julia James.
