= Hafan y Môr =

Holiday camp in northwest Wales

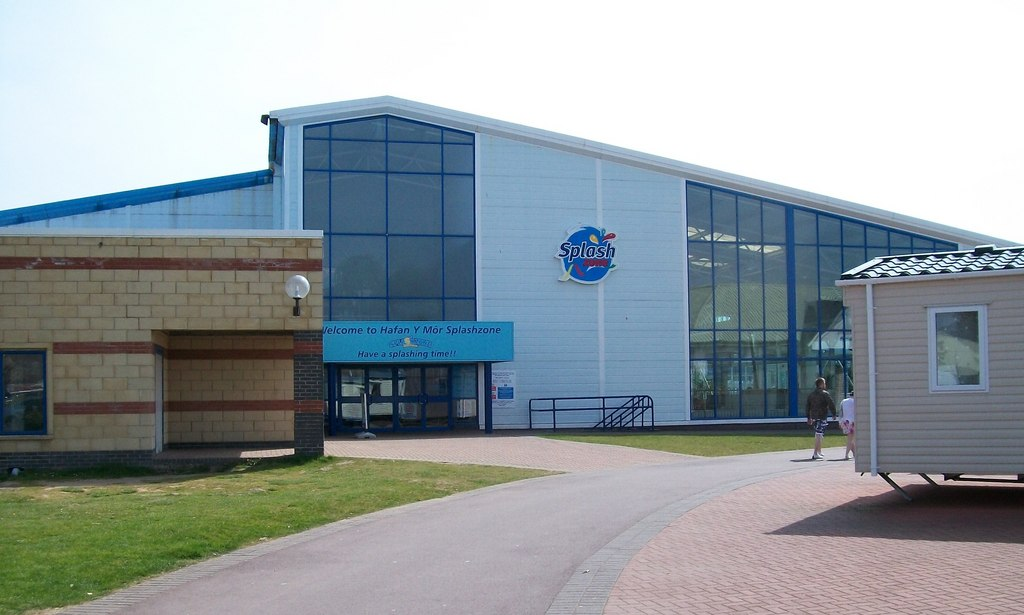

- Location within Gwynedd
- Location: Pwllheli, Wales
- Coordinates: 52.92°N 4.33°W
- Established: 1999
- Website: www.haven.com/parks/wales/Hafan_Y_Mor/

Hafan y Môr (formerly the site of Butlin's Pwllheli) is a holiday camp located near Pwllheli in Wales. It is currently run by Haven Holidays.

In 1999 the camp became part of Haven Holidays, along with the Heads of Ayr camp, as part of an internal reorganisation within The Rank Group who, at the time, owned both Butlins and Haven (both have since been purchased by the owner of British Holidays, Bourne Leisure, in 2000). Since being taken over by Haven Holidays it was renamed Hafan y Môr (Haven of the Sea) and the focus of operations was transformed from predominantly chalet accommodation to mostly static caravan accommodation. Most of the attractions were also removed including the chairlift, miniature railway, roller coaster and funfair. In 2011, the campsite underwent a 1.2 million pound makeover. The fairground was removed and the 'show bar' (the entertainment building) was redone. The plaza was also modernized, and new ropeworks in the forest established. In 2017, the swimming complex underwent a 3 million pound makeover. All of the swimming pools were ripped out and completely redone from the ground up, with two brand new swimming pools added on.
