= Peter Harris (entrepreneur) =

British businessman (born 1934)

- Born: March 1934 (age 92)
- Occupation: Businessman
- Known for: Founder, Bourne Leisure; Owner of Butlins

Peter Harris (born March 1934) is a British businessman. He is best known for founding Bourne Leisure in 1964 and the owner of Butlins from September 2022.

== Career ==
In 1964, Harris co-founded Bourne Leisure, a holiday and leisure company which owns Haven Holidays and Warner Leisure Hotels, after he audited a caravan park in his former role as an accountant. His co-founder was David Allen.

In 1977, he began to buy land at Tring in Hertfordshire, where he trained racehorses until 2004. For the next seven years, the training licence was held by his son-in-law Walter Swinburn. Following his retirement as a trainer, Harris remained a significant owner of the yard. Swinburn relinquished his licence at the end of October 2011 for "commercial reasons". The estate was put on the market by Harris shortly after Swinburn's retirement.

In 2013, Harris was honoured by the British Travel & Hospitality Hall of Fame in 2013.

Harris was born in the UK. He owns several other companies, including an aviation business and a golf course.

In 2021, the Sunday Times Rich List estimated his net worth at £1.534 billion.

In 2021, Harris sold his majority shareholding in Bourne Leisure to private equity company, Blackstone in a deal that valued the business at £3 billion. Harris resigned as a director of the business, but remains a minority shareholder.

It was announced in September 2022, that the Harris Family Trust had bought back Butlins in a deal estimated to be worth £300 million. However the deal did not include Butlins property assets which were sold earlier in the year to the UK’s largest pension scheme, the Universities Superannuation Scheme, also for £300 million.
