= Siblu =

- Type: Private
- Industry: Leisure
- Predecessor: Haven Europe
- Founded: 1975
- Headquarters: Pessac
- Number of locations: 23 holiday parks in France & the Netherlands
- Area served: France, the Netherlands
- Key people: Simon Crabbe
- Products: Mobile home holiday parks Mobile home sales
- Parent: Naxicap Partners
- Website: siblu.co.uk, siblu.ie

Siblu (formerly Haven Europe) owns and operates 23 large family holiday parks in France and the Netherlands. Siblu's holiday parks are located across Normandy, the Brittany coastline, the west of France, the Loire Valley, the Mediterranean coast, Zeeland and the Wadden Sea. The parks have Dutch, French and English speaking staff and the facilities are aimed at families with a mix of accommodation such as mobile homes and chalets.

The sites are mainly classified 4 stars.

Siblu has two distinct activities: the rental of short or long stays in mobil-homes; The sale of mobile homes on its villages via an integrated turnkey offer, with the possibility of including rental management.

== History ==
- 1975 - Start of sales activity in France as a tour operator under the name Freshfields (The Rank Group).
- 1981 - The Haven brand (now known as Eurovax) buys the two open-air villages: Les Charmettes and Le Lac des Rêves.
- 1986 - Rank Group acquires Haven and therefore the two villages mentioned above (first parks owned) - Start of the sale of mobile homes.
- 1994 - Haven becomes Haven Europe (The Rank Group).
- 1995 - Haven Europe buys Le Domaine de Kerlann .
- 1998 - Haven Europe buys Le Bois Masson and Le Bois Dormant.
- 1999 - Acquisition of 3 new villages: La Carabasse, La Pignade and La Réserve .
- 2000 - Rank Group sells Haven Europe to Bourne Leisure.
- 2003 - Haven Europe is gradually changing its name. Coexistence of the two brand names: Haven Europe and Siblu for four years.
- 2004 - Bourne Leisure sells Siblu / Haven Europe to a group of English investors.
- 2006 - €150 million refinancing operation ( Hermes Private Equity )
- 2007 - Acquisition of four new villages: Domaine de Litteau and Le Montourey .
- 2008 - Two new acquisitions: Bonne Anse Plage and Les Sables du Midi .
- 2012 - Acquisition of the Rives de Condrieu, a campsite located in Rhône Alpes.
- 2014 - Won a silver award at the British Travel Awards in the category of best camping and mobile home company
- 2015 - Bought by Stirling Square Capital Partners
- 2016 - Appointment of Simon Crabbe as President and CEO
- 2017 - Acquisition of Les Dunes de Contis in the Landes.
- 2018 - Acquisition of Mar Estang in the Pyrénées-Orientales and Le Conguel in Brittany.
- Late 2018 - Acquisition of Siblu's first Dutch holiday park: De Oase in Zeeland, the Netherlands.
- 2019 - Acquisition of a second Dutch holiday park: In de Bongerd in Zeeland, the Netherlands.
- Early 2020 - Acquisition of Lauwersoog holiday park in the north of the Netherlands.

== Holiday parks ==
As of 2020 Siblu owns 20 parks in France and 3 in the Netherlands.

- Les Charmettes (Charente-Maritime)
- Domaine de Soulac (Aquitaine)
- Le Lac des Rêves (Languedoc)
- Bonne Anse Plage (Charente-Maritime)
- Les Pierres Couchées (Loire-Atlantique)
- La Réserve (Aquitaine)
- Domaine de Dugny (Loir-et-Cher)
- Domaine de Kerlann (Bretagne)
- Le Bois Masson (Vendée)
- La Carabasse (Languedoc)
- Les Sables du Midi(Languedoc)
- La Pignade Charente-Maritime
- Domaine de Litteau (Calvados)
- Le Bois Dormant (Vendée)
- Le Montourey (French Riviera)
- Les Rives de Condrieu (Rhône-Alpes)
- Les Dunes de Contis (Aquitaine)
- Mar Estang (Languedoc)
- Le Conguel (Bretagne)
- De Oase (Zeeland)
- In de Bongerd (Zeeland)
- Lauwersoog (Wadden Sea)
