= Butlins Bognor Regis =

Holiday camp in the seaside resort of Bognor Regis, West Sussex, England

Butlin's Bognor Regis
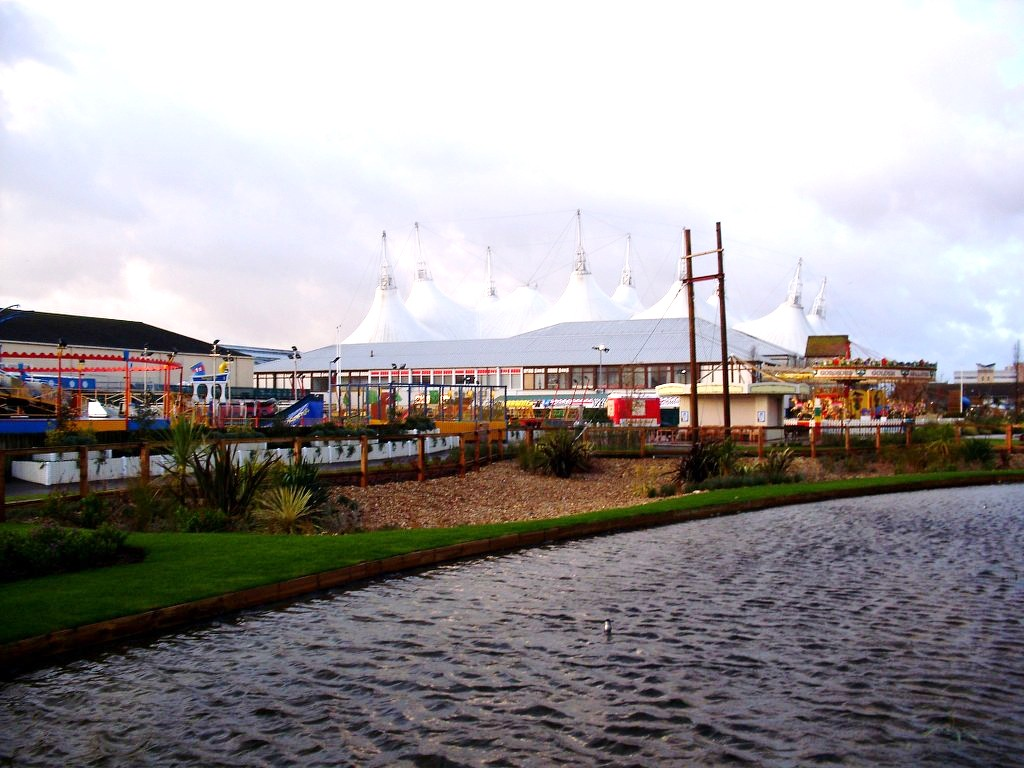

- Location within West Sussex
- Location: Bognor Regis, West Sussex, UK
- Coordinates: 50.7851°N 0.6631°W
- Subsequent names: Butlin's Bognor (2 July 1960–1987); Southcoast World (1987 – January 1999); Butlins Bognor Regis Resort (January 1999–present)
- Campus size: 60 acres (0.24 km^{2})
- Residences: 5,800 (beds)
- Facilities: Amusement park, swimming pool
- Established: 2 July 1960
- Website: Butlins.com

Butlin's Bognor Regis is a holiday camp in the seaside resort of Bognor Regis, West Sussex, England. It lies 55.5 miles (89 km) south southwest of London. Butlin's presence in the town began in 1932 with the opening of an amusement park; their operation soon expanded to take in a zoo as well. In 1960, Billy Butlin opened his first post-war mainland holiday camp, moving both the amusement park and zoo into the new camp. The camp survived a series of cuts in the early 1980s, attracting further investment and again in the late 1990s when it was retained as one of only three camps still bearing the Butlin name. The camp has since seen a raft of new construction as the company moves from chalet towards hotel-based accommodation.

== History ==
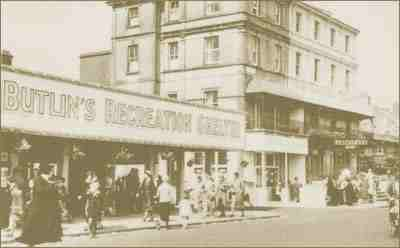
Butlins Recreation Shelter in the 1930s

In 1932, Butlin saw an opportunity to create a similar amusement park in Bognor Regis to the one he had in Skegness. Butlin purchased land on the corner of Lennox Street and the Esplanade, which had previously been the Olympian Gardens. Butlin constructed his amusement park on the land and called it "Butlin's Recreation Shelter". In 1928, Butlin had secured an exclusive license to sell Dodgem cars in Europe, (Note: Scott 2001, p. 6.) and these were one of the first attractions in the shelter along with one-armed bandits. The shelter was a popular venue with the local press of the time reporting that patrons could "meet the elite" there.

The following year, Butlin opened a zoo on the seafront. It opened on 5 July and contained brown, black and polar bears, hyenas, leopards, pelicans, kangaroos, and monkeys. The zoo had a snake pit as its star attraction where Togo the snake king would regularly give shows. For some time, the park in Bognor was run by Butlin's mother Bertha Butlin though she later left to run his park on Hayling Island. (Note: Dacre 1982, pp. 89)

During World War II, the park at Bognor was a cause for concern for Butlin. The park had always had a shooting range and during the late 1930s the targets were replaced with images of Hitler, Göring, Goebbels, and Ribbentrop. After the Battle of Dunkirk, Butlin became concerned that should the Germans invade the south coast, the first thing they might see was the gallery, making Butlin into a target. (Note: Dacre 1982, pp. 130)

== Butlin's Holiday Camp ==
In late 1959, Butlin was looking to open another camp in the town and reached a deal with Bognor Regis town council to purchase a 39-acre (16 ha) site at the east end of the promenade. The agreement was met with local opposition (as some of his previous camps had), so Butlin ran an advert in the local press advising that he would remove his "unsightly" fun fairs from the middle of promenade, if he was allowed to move them to his new site. Further to this, he commented that he would be willing to spend more on advertising the town than any of the local hoteliers had.

Many local residents disliked the new camp, despite Butlin having created some 500 local jobs during the construction period. There were complaints that the site bore a resemblance to a prison, and that the town would have been better off if the site had been used for new housing. During construction, one of the works that was required was the straightening of a stream known as the Aldingbourne Rife which formed a U shape onto the proposed site. (Note: Salzman, Hudson 1997, p. 163.) However, due to a particularly wet winter, the river burst its banks and flooded the site, leaving it deep in mud. As well as the poor underfoot conditions, Butlin developed gout, which hindered his mobility. (Note: Dacre 1982, p. 204.) Those who worked on the site recalled vehicles becoming stuck due to the conditions, and mattresses in their plastic wrappings being used to form walkways throughout the camp.

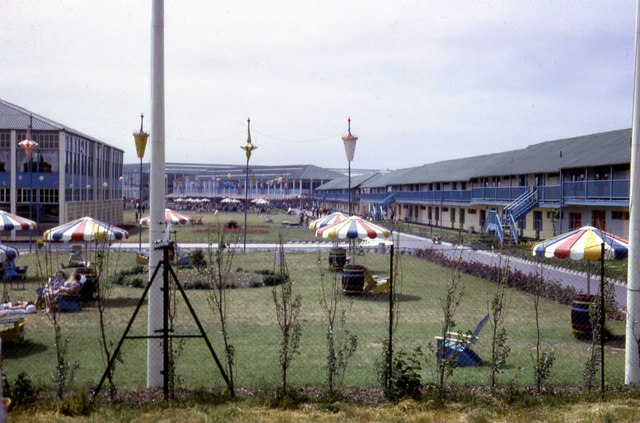
Butlins Bognor Camp in 1962

On 2 July 1960, Billy Butlin opened his new holiday camp at Bognor. The cost of construction was £2.5 million and due to the flooding the camp was not ready on its opening date. Butlin offered his patrons the chance to be re-sited at the Clacton camp instead; however, a number of guests opted to stay and help; those who did received a free bottle of Champagne as a reward. Once opened, the camp accommodated around 5,000 campers and another 5,000-day visitors.

At its peak, the camp saw 6,000 guests moving in every Saturday whilst the last 6,000 left the same day. The camp had 1,300 staff to look after the needs of the guests, including the Redcoats. (Note: Löfgren 2002, p. 247.) When the camp opened, all guests were catered on either full or half board basis; however, in 1968 Butlin handed running of the company to his son Bobby Butlin, who introduced self-catering accommodation as a means to reduce labour costs. (Note: Scott 2001, p. 6.)

Butlin's Bognor was refurbished through the 1980s. In 1987, the camp was renamed Southcoast World following a £16.5 million spend on new and updated accommodation, the addition of a new indoor water complex and a new miniature steam railway.

In 1998, as one of Butlin's three remaining locations, Bognor again underwent major refurbishment. The Southcoast World identity was dropped, and £45 million was invested in redevelopment. A Skyline Pavilion was added to the resort, providing a huge undercover area for year-round, weather-protected facilities. The Skyline Pavilion contained new shops, bars, restaurants and entertainment areas. The refurbishment also included further updates to the chalet accommodation, a redesign for the Redcoat uniform and the provision of a resort police constable to improve security. The camp was relaunched by pop star Ronan Keating in May 1999. At the same time, the company dropped its use of the possessive apostrophe, changing from Butlin's to Butlins; after the refurbishment, the resort was renamed as Butlins Resort Bognor Regis. (Note: Prideaux 2009, p. 81.)

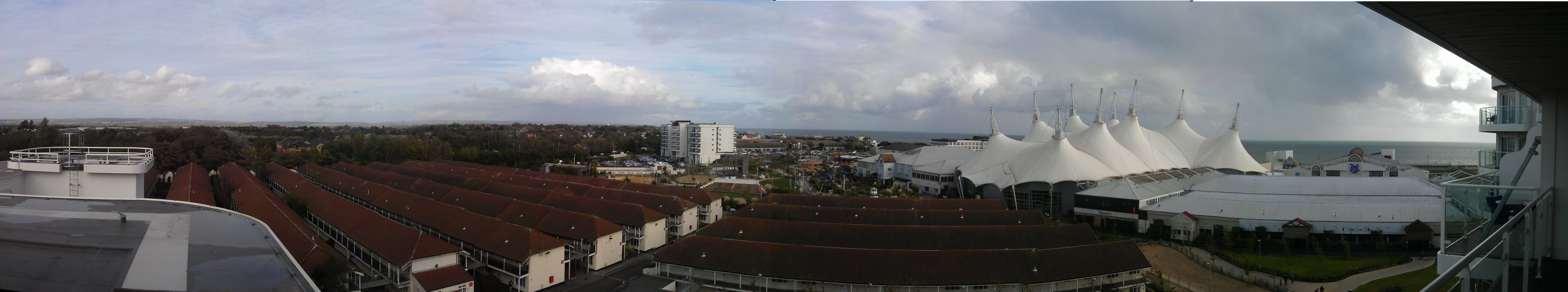
A panorama of the Butlins Bognor Resort taken from the Wave hotel

== Butlins Resort Bognor Regis ==
As of 2011, the resort catered for over 385,000 visitors per year with 300,000 being resident and 85,000 visiting for the day, and employed 850 staff each year, 35 of which made up the Redcoat team. It was one of the largest employers in the Bognor Regis area as of 2007.

Over the years, many of the attractions have been removed. However the resort still retains a swimming pool and funfair. Today it provides a range of activities such as rock climbing, fencing, and archery. It also provides a wide range of entertainment, aided by the formation of strategic partnerships with popular brands, including The X Factor, Britain's Got Talent, Thomas & Friends, Brainiac: Science Abuse, Guinness World Records, Bob the Builder, Pingu and Angelina Ballerina.

The site is 60 acres in size, and has been at the forefront of a move towards hotel accommodation by the company. Including the hotels, the camp has 4,800 beds available.

On October 7, 2024, Butlins opened PLAYXPERIENCE, a large indoor activity and entertainment centre designed as an immersive, multi-activity venue combining gaming, sports, and social entertainment experiences for both families and adult visitors following a reported investment of approximately £15 million. It was developed as part of a broader investment programme at the Bognor Regis resort aimed at expanding year-round indoor entertainment catering to family holiday guests, offering daytime activities suitable for children and groups and adult visitors, particularly those attending Butlin’s “Big Weekender” events, with evening social and competitive gaming experiences. Unlike the other "included in the price" fairground activities, this attraction operates on a token-based system for activities, allowing visitors to choose and pay for individual experiences. It marked a notable shift in Butlin’s offering toward technology-driven and immersive entertainment. It forms part of a wider redevelopment strategy across the company’s UK resorts in the 2020s, aimed at modernising traditional holiday camp experiences.

=== Bognor Hotels ===
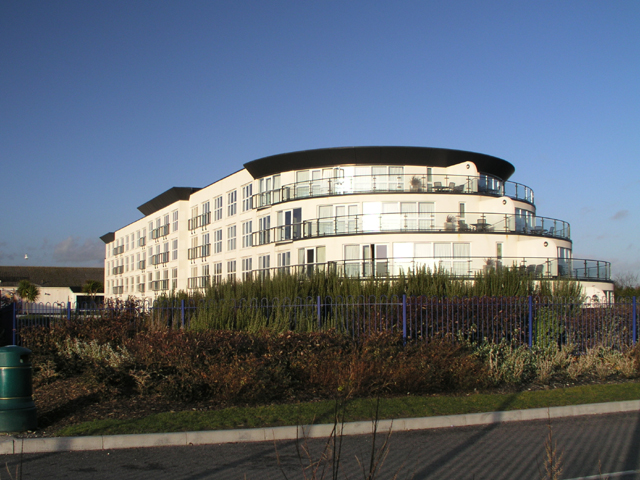
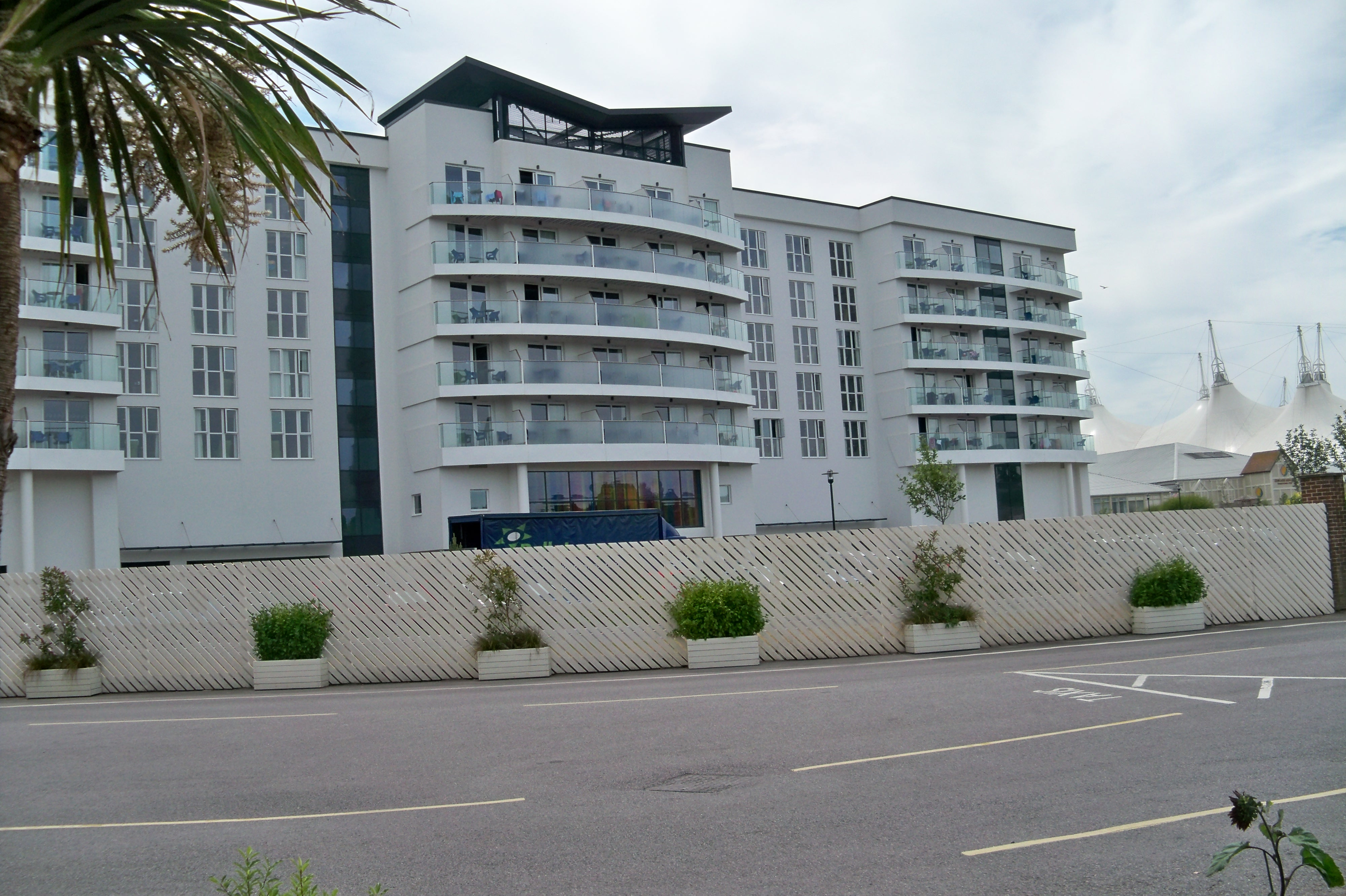
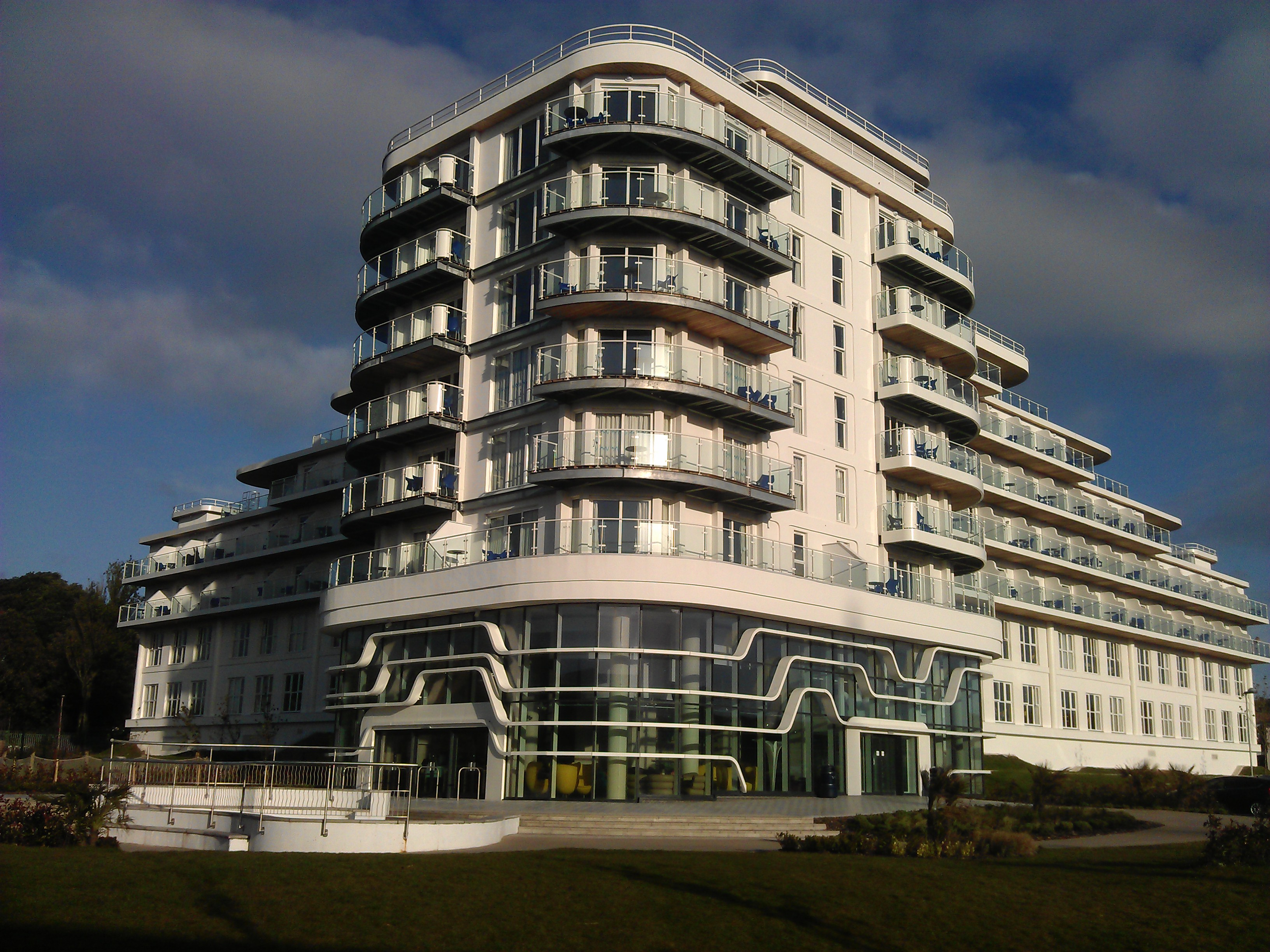
Butlins Bognor Regis hotels

In 2005, further work was undertaken to update the resort with the introduction of the Shoreline Hotel. £10 million was spent on the hotel and its surrounding landscaped gardens. With big porthole windows, and a ship-like prow, the four-floor hotel was designed with a slightly nautical feel. The hotel provides 160 rooms of three different grades. in addition to the regular Butlin's facilities. The success of the Shoreline saw another hotel opening in the autumn of 2009. Costing £20 million to construct, the hotel was named the Ocean Hotel. In July 2012, Butlins' latest hotel opened; named the Wave Hotel, it is the first Butlins' hotel to feature self-catering apartments. A further three hotels are being planned as part of Bognor Regis Regeneration.

== Influence ==
The camp was the location for a scene in the film The Beauty Jungle (1963) starring Janette Scott and Ian Hendry. The film was produced by The Rank Organisation, (Note: Diss 2006, p. 137–139.) which owned Butlin's Ltd itself from 1972 till 2000. (Note: Scott 2001, p. 8-9.) Butlins Bognor Regis also served as the setting for the honeymoon scenes in the film The Leather Boys (1964) directed by Sidney J. Furie.

Musical acts to have played at Bognor include The Hollies, The Four Tops, Billy Ocean, Edwin Starr, The Osmonds and Fats Domino as well as later acts such as Atomic Kitten, Mis-Teeq, Olly Murs, and Peter Andre.

== Entertainment ==
The original Bognor Regis camp featured Butlins Redcoats, a funfair, a ballroom, a boating lake, tennis courts, a sports field (for the three legged and egg & spoon races and the donkey derby), table tennis and snooker tables, amusement arcades, a theatre and arcades of shops.

== Bibliography ==
- Dacre, Peter (1982). The Billy Butlin Story. Robson Books. ISBN 0-86051-864-7.
- Diss, Dave (2006). Creatures of our time, in a land fit for heroes. Dave Diss. ISBN 0-646-46721-2.
- Löfgren, Orvar (2002). On holiday: a history of vacationing. University of California Press. ISBN 0-520-23464-2.
- Prideaux, Bruce (2009). Resort Destinations: Evolution, Management and Development. Butterworth-Heinemann. ISBN 0-7506-5753-7.
- Salzman, Louis Francis; Hudson, T. P. (1997). The Victoria history of the county of Sussex. Vol. 5, Part 1. A. Constable.
- Scott, Peter (February 2001). A History of the Butlin's Railways. Peter Scott. p. 6. ISBN 1-902368-09-6.
