= Butlin's =

British chain of holiday resorts

Butlins Skyline Limited
- Type: Private
- Industry: Leisure
- Founded: 1 January 1936 (First site, Skegness); 9 April 2000 (As present company)
- Founder: Billy Butlin
- Headquarters: Hemel Hempstead, Hertfordshire, England
- Area served: United Kingdom
- Key people: Jon Hendry Pickup (CEO)
- Products: Seaside resorts
- Revenue: ▲£184.6M (2010)
- Operating income: ▲£17.2M (2010)
- Net income: ▲£12.2M (2010)
- Owner: Harris Family Trusts
- Number of employees: 3,571 (2010)
- Website: butlins.com

Butlin's is a chain of large seaside resorts in the United Kingdom, incorporated as Butlins Skyline Limited. Butlin's was founded by Billy Butlin to provide affordable holidays for ordinary British families.

Between 1936 and 1966, ten camps were built, including one in Ireland and one in the Bahamas. In the 1970s and 1980s, Butlin's also operated numerous large hotels, including one in Spain, a number of smaller holiday parks in England and France, and a revolving restaurant in the Post Office Tower in London.

Tough competition from overseas package holiday operators, rising operational costs, and rapidly changing demand, forced many of the Butlin's operations to close in the 1980s and 1990s. Three of the original camps remain open under the Butlins brand in Bognor Regis, Minehead, and Skegness. They are now owned and run by Butlins Skyline Ltd, which is now wholly owned by the Harris Family Trust.

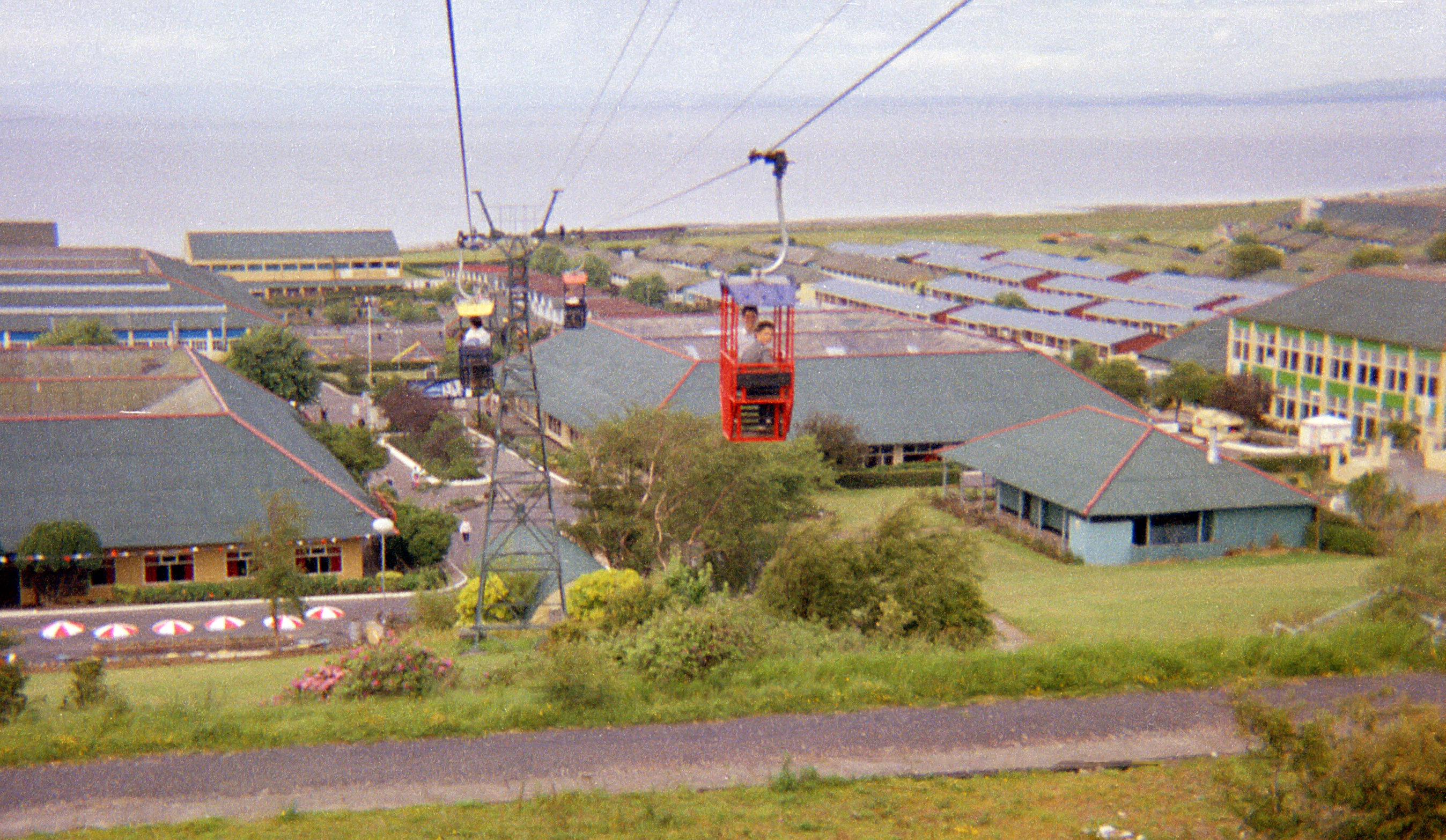
The architecture seen in this 1985 photograph of Butlin's in Ayr was typical of most camps before refurbishment. Note the rows of chalets in the distance.

== History ==
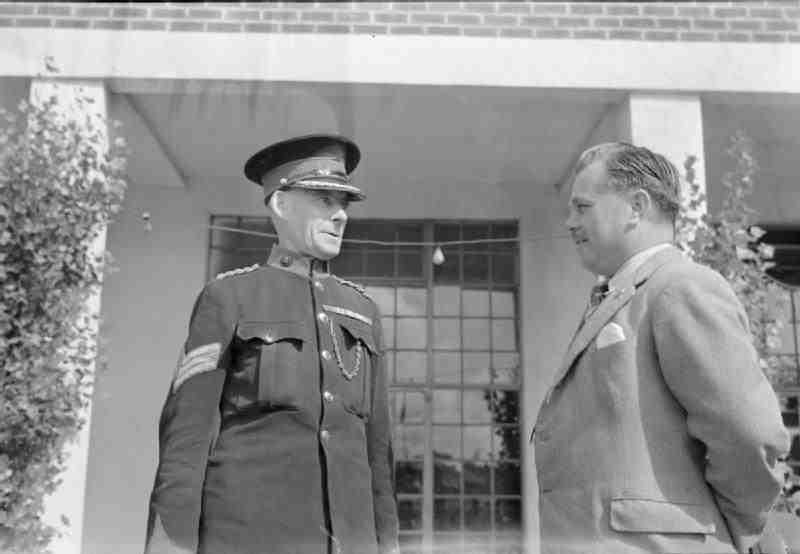
Billy Butlin receiving Filey camp back from the RAF, who ran it as RAF Hunmanby Moor during the Second World War

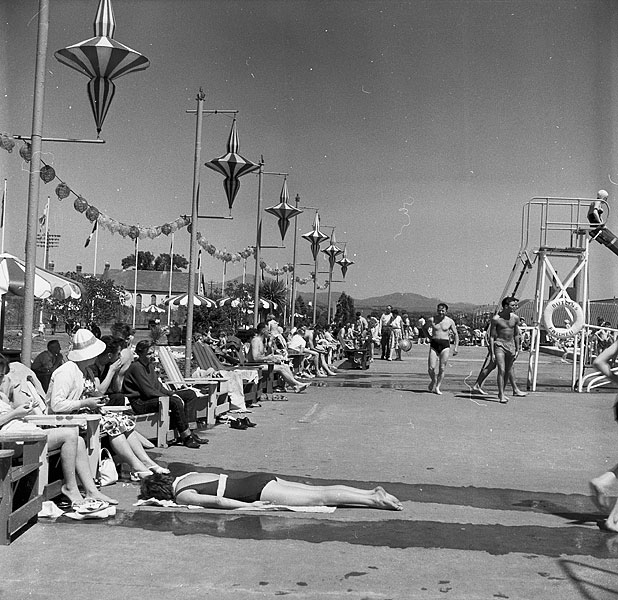
The Butlins camp at Pwllheli in 1961

Billy Butlin's inspiration for his holiday camp empire came from an unhappy holiday on Barry Island in his youth, when he had been locked out of his bed and breakfast accommodation all day by his landlady, which was normal practice at the time. The first of the Butlin's holiday camps was opened by Butlin in 1936 in Skegness, following his success in developing amusement parks. A second camp quickly followed in Clacton in 1938, and construction of Filey Holiday Camp began in 1939. With the outbreak of the Second World War, building at Filey was postponed, and the camps at Skegness and Clacton were given over for military use. Wartime use of Butlin's camps continued, with resorts at Ayr, Filey, and Pwllheli being completed and opened as military camps. The Ayr camp was later renamed Wonderwest World, and is now owned and run by Haven under the name Craig Tara, part of Bourne Leisure, who previously owned both brands.

In 1945, with the war over, Filey was re-opened as a holiday camp. The camps at Skegness and Clacton opened in 1946, Ayr and Pwllheli in 1947 and Mosney on the east coast of Ireland in 1948. Butlin's became popular in post-war Britain, with family entertainment and activities available for the equivalent of a week's pay.

In 1948, Butlin acquired two hotels in the Bahamas, and in the 1950s Butlin's began acquiring hotels in England and Wales: Saltdean, near Brighton (1953), Blackpool (1955) and five in Cliftonville (1955–1956). Further post-war camps were opened in the 1960s at Bognor Regis (1960), Minehead (1962) and Barry Island (1966). A site was acquired and permission given for a further camp at Holme Dunes, Norfolk. However, these plans were abandoned after the devastating floods of 31 January 1953; the site was later purchased by the Norfolk Naturalists Trust in 1965.

In the late 1940s, Butlin's launched an ambitious project to build a 1000-guest resort at West End, Grand Bahama Island in the Bahamas from scratch, including the construction of an airport, West End Airport. Almost all materials and equipment had to be brought in by air or boat onto an island that at the time was almost completely undeveloped. Butlin's operated the partially-completed facility for one season (1950) only before running out of money. A small part of the resort was put back into operation in 1955 before US interests redeveloped it in 1960.

The camps at Ayr and Skegness also had separate self-contained hotels within their grounds. In later years, they were joined by further hotels in Scarborough (1978), Llandudno (1981), London (1993), a sixth hotel at Cliftonville and one in Spain (1983). In the 1960s and 1970s, the company also operated the Top of the Tower revolving restaurant at the then-named Post Office Tower in London.

In 1968, Butlin's son Bobby took over the management of Butlin's, and in 1972 the business was sold to the Rank Organisation for £43 million. The number of camps peaked at ten between 1966 and 1980, but the business experienced the problems being faced by the British seaside holiday industry as a whole, with the introduction of cheap package holidays to Mediterranean resorts from the 1960s onwards. It also had an image problem of being seen as providing regimented holidays, which caused it to all but abandon the Butlin's name at its remaining resorts between 1987 and 1990.

The camp at Mosney closed in 1982, Clacton and Filey closed in 1983, and the camp at Barry was sold in 1986 (eventually closing in 1996). The lease on the Top of the Tower restaurant expired in 1980. In 1998, the camps at Ayr and Pwllheli were handed over to Butlin's sister company; Haven. All the Butlin's hotels dating from the 1950s to 1990s were sold in 1998, but most are still open today under different ownership. The art deco style Ocean Hotel at Saltdean has been redeveloped into apartments, and the hotels at Cliftonville have both been demolished.

In 1998, the "Holiday Worlds" branding was dropped for the remaining resorts in favour of returning the emphasis to the core Butlin's name. Subsequently, in September 2000, the resorts and brand were sold to Bourne Leisure. A new Butlin's logo was eventually introduced in 1999, which has subsequently undergone several modifications and was used until 2011 when Butlin's introduced a design similar to their original logo. The new logo was originally only intended to be used temporarily to commemorate the 75th anniversary of Butlin's, but its use continued into 2012 and 2013 and is now the official logo.

In 2005, the new £10 million Shoreline hotel was unveiled at the Bognor Regis resort to expand on the existing variety of apartments on the site. The hotel, styled with an Art Deco theme, aimed to offer luxury accommodation in conjunction with the entertainment and facilities at the resort. Each of the 160 rooms features floor-to-ceiling windows, twin or king-size beds, leatherette chairs, televisions, DVD players and en-suite facilities. Some have sea views. A second site, Ocean Hotel, opened at Bognor in 2009, styled in a high contemporary standard.

In September 2022, it was announced that Blackstone Group that had bought Butlins in 2021 and the Bourne Leisure Group, sold Butlins back to one of the original founding families of Bourne Leisure. In a £300 million deal The Harris Family Trust bought back Butlins, the deal however does not include Butlins property assets as these were sold earlier in the year to the UK’s largest pension fund, the Universities Superannuation Scheme for £300 million.

== Locations ==
Location of current Butlins holiday camps

Butlins camps past and present
Location	Opened	Closed	Comments
Ayr	1947	1998	Known as Wonderwest World 1988–1998; operated as Craig Tara by Haven since 1999.
West End, Grand Bahama Island	1950	Late 1980s	Ambitious undertaking constructing a 1000-guest holiday camp from scratch on a nearly completely undeveloped island, including building an airport. The village received 18,363 visitors in 1950. It was reportedly operated for a single season before running out of money. The site is now occupied by a new hotel and marina complex known as Old Bahama Bay.
Barry Island	1966	1996	Operated independently until closure in 1996. Demolished in 2005.
Bognor Regis	1960	Current	Known as Southcoast World 1987–1998. Still open as Butlins Bognor Regis.
Clacton	1938	1983	Demolished, now a housing estate. Small area yet to be redeveloped.
Filey Holiday Camp	1945	1983	Operated independently for six weeks in 1986, but the venture failed and it closed. Gradually demolished between 1988 and 2003. The northern end of the site is now part of the Haven caravan park, Primrose Valley, and the southern end is being developed as The Bay Filey, comprising holiday homes, leisure and sports facilities and a hotel.
Minehead	1962	Current	Known as Somerwest World 1986–1998. Still open as Butlins Minehead 30 April 1999–present.
Mosney	1948	1980	Operated independently until closure and conversion into an Irish Government refugee centre for asylum seekers in 2000. Most of the original camp buildings are still in use.
Pwllheli	1947	1998	Known as Starcoast World 1990–1998; operated as Hafan Y Mor by Haven since 1999.
Skegness	1936	Current	Known as Funcoast World 1987–1998. Still open as Butlins Skegness.

In addition to these main locations known at various times as "Holiday Camps", "Holiday Centres", "Holiday Villages", "Holiday Worlds" and more recently as "Resorts", Butlins also operated numerous smaller holiday parks in England and France for several years during the late 1970s. These were known as "Freshfields holidays" and were more basic parks with far fewer facilities and little or no entertainment. They were aimed at those wanting a quieter, more relaxed holiday.

Butlins Freshfield Holiday Camps
Location	Opened	Closed	Comments
Duporth Holiday Village, St Austell	1934	2006	Operated as Butlins from 1972; operated as Haven from 1985.
Seaview Holiday Village, Polperro	?	Present	Operated as Butlins from 1973; Currently operated independently and sold on the independent owners behalf by Hoseasons.
Sunshine Holiday Centre, Hayling Island	?	Present	Operated as Butlins from 1973; Currently operating independently as "Mill Rythe Holiday Resort".
St Minver	?	Present	Operated as Butlins from 1971; Currently operated by Parkdean Holidays.
Tencreek Holiday Park, Looe	?	Present	Operated as Butlins from 1973; Currently operated by Dolphin Holidays.
Ayrville, St Ives, Cornwall	?	Present	Operated as Butlins from 1974; Currently operating as "Ayr Holiday Park".
Two Chimneys, Penzance	?	Present	Operated as Butlins from 1974; Currently operated by Rojo Leisure.

Butlins hotels past and present
Location	Opened	Closed	Comments
Ayr	1946	Early 1970s	Demolished in the 1970s
Bognor Regis – Wave	2012	Present	Newly opened within Bognor resort
Bognor Regis – Ocean	2009	Present	Opened 2009 within Bognor resort
Bognor Regis – Shoreline	2007	Present	Opened 2007 within Bognor resort
Borehamwood	1939	1942	Demolished in the 1980s and replaced with modern Hotel
Blackpool	1955	1998	Still open as Grand Metropole Hotel
Cliftonville	1955	1999	Partially demolished, remainder converted to flats.
Llandudno	1981	1998	Still open as Grand Hotel.
London	1993	1998	Still open as Grand Plaza Hotel.
Saltdean	1952	1999	Converted to flats.
Scarborough	1978	1999	Still open as Grand Hotel.
Skegness	1948	1974	Ingoldmells building still standing and now used as an amusement arcade within the Butlins Skegness resort
Torremolinos	1983	1998	Still open as Griego Mar Hotel.

== Facilities ==
=== Accommodation ===
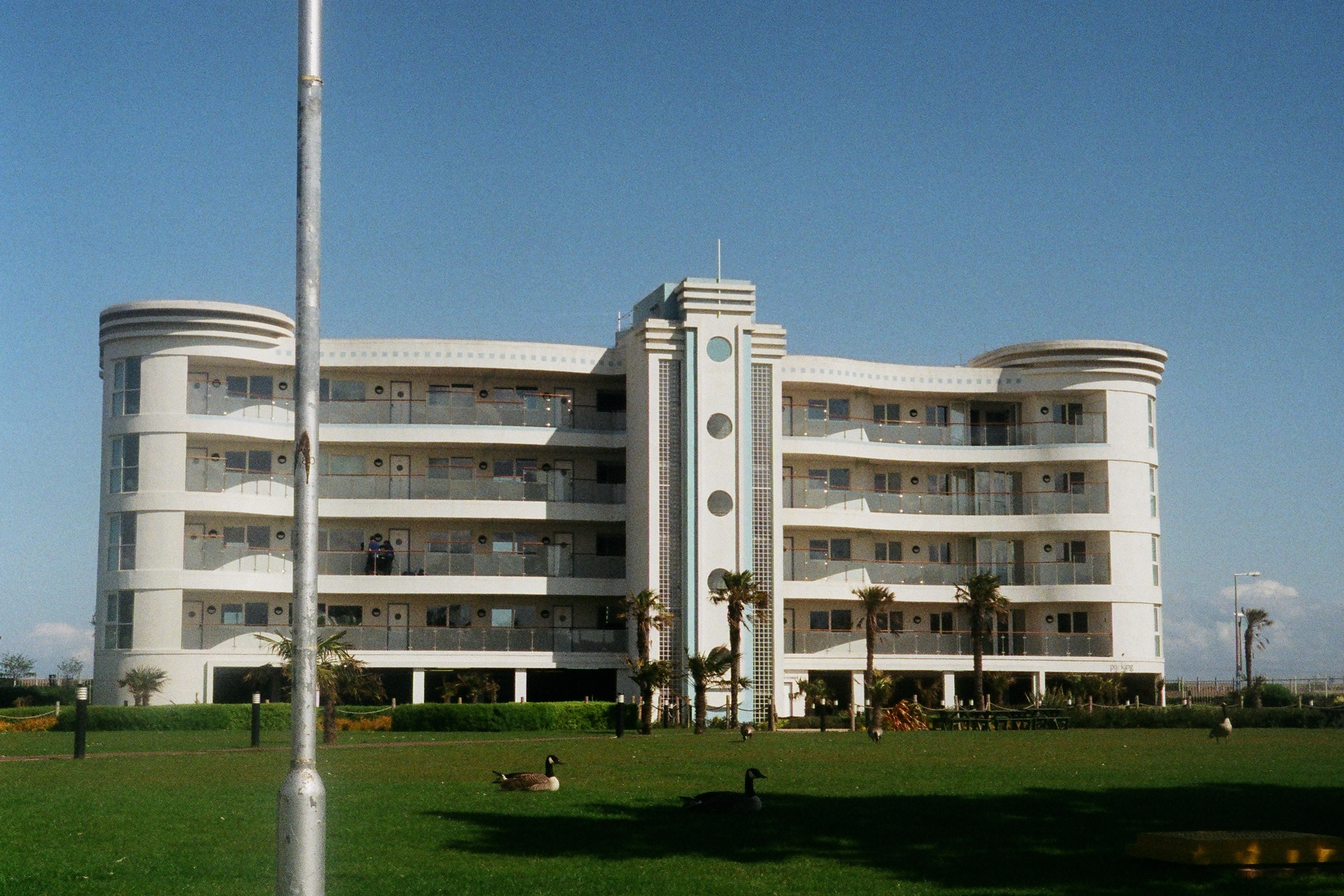
Blue Skies Apartments in Minehead

Butlins resorts offer various accommodation options to cater for different tastes and budgets. These range from "Standard" rooms and apartments to "Silver", "Gold", and "Deluxe" rooms and apartments for higher levels of luxury. There are also "BlueSkies" apartments available at Minehead, and 3 luxury hotels at Butlin's Bognor.

Butlins was originally known for its "chalet" accommodation, which for decades was the only form of accommodation and consisted of many long blocks. These were arranged so that each line of chalets faced another line, with a grassed area in the middle. Originally there were no toilets in individual chalets (campers had to use communal toilet blocks located in the middle of every few chalet lines) and the furnishings were very basic. Many of these chalet lines are still in use today, but have been enlarged and significantly upgraded to modern standards. All chalets now have en-suite bathroom facilities.

One of the first chalets is still standing at the Skegness resort and is now heritage listed and a historical display only.

=== Skyline Pavilion ===
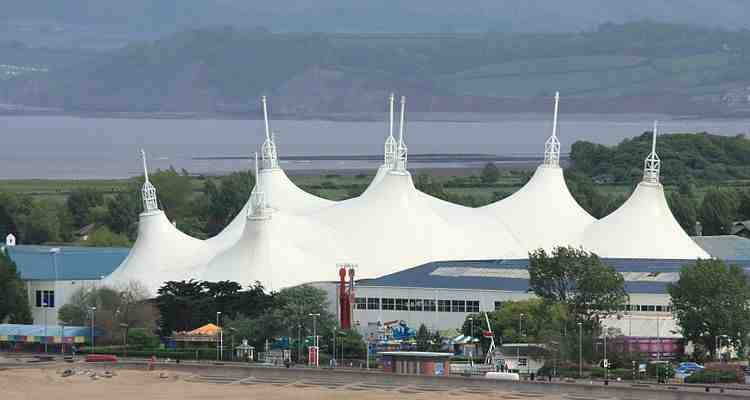
Skyline Pavilion in Minehead

The "Skyline Pavilion" is the central entertainment complex at each resort, which is enclosed under a white tensile fabric canopy. These were created during the 1998–99 closed season by linking together several pre-existing buildings so that space within those buildings could be used to provide all-weather facilities within the Skyline Pavilions.

Each Skyline Pavilion contains a stage (used mainly for daytime children's shows), a cafe and associated seating, a bar (known as Bar Rosso, The Jellyfish Lounge, Soho Coffee or Costa Coffee), restaurants such as Burger King, Papa John's, Turner's, an amusement arcade, an information counter (termed "infunmation point"), and various shops selling novelties, souvenirs, and groceries. Many of the other venues and attractions in the resort can be accessed directly from within the Skyline Pavilion also.

=== Splash Waterworld ===
Each resort features a large indoor waterpark known as Splash Waterworld. These contain several waterslides, spas, a wave pool, and a lazy river. There is also a shallow pool area for young children, and sometimes an area for "serious" swimming. Minehead also has an outdoor toddler pool that is open in the summer months. Guests and day visitors can use these facilities at no additional cost.

In 2013, the Skegness resort opened a £16 million redevelopment of the Splash Waterworld that features two new octane flumes (Jet Stream and Vortex, which has a space-bowl), a new dinghy ride (The Riptide), a rope-walk challenge (Captain's Challenge), a lazy river, a poolside cafe and DJ. It also has a new outdoor fountain area that replaced the outdoor pool, the fountains go along with music (every hour) and lights. In 2019, Butlins opened a new Splash Waterworld at the Bognor Regis resort with a vintage seaside funfair theme.

== Entertainment ==
There are various large entertainment venues within the resorts including Centre Stage, Studio 36, Reds and Skyline Stage. Additionally, there is Bar Rosso, Hotshots 10-pin bowling centre with bar and snooker tables, Green Baize snooker hall (originally at all camps but now at Skegness only), and several additional bars, pubs, and cafes which vary from one Butlins resort to another. Nearly all entertainment is included in the cost of the holiday or day visitor entry.

Television presenter Stephen Mulhern has been an annual act at all three resorts performing during the summer and at selected school Holiday breaks.

=== Notable headliners at Centre Stage (Bognor Regis) ===
- Spider-Man The Musical (30 April 1999 – 25 June 1999)
- The Mask Musical (28 June 1999 – 4 September 1999)
- Casper The Musical (6 September 1999 – 26 November 1999)

=== Notable headliners at Centre Stage (Minehead) ===
- Casper The Musical (30 April 1999 – 25 June 1999)
- Spider-Man The Musical (28 June 1999 – 4 September 1999)
- The Mask Musical (6 September 1999 – 26 November 1999)
- Tweenies Live! (2004)

=== Notable headliners at Centre Stage (Skegness) ===
- The Mask Musical (30 April 1999 – 25 June 1999)
- Casper The Musical (28 June 1999 – 4 September 1999)
- Spider-Man The Musical (6 September 1999 – 26 November 1999)

== Sports and recreation ==
Butlins resorts offer a variety of sports sessions and coaching, for example, archery, fencing, tennis (Skegness only), table tennis, and football. Most of these sessions are included in the cost of holiday or day visitor entry price.

For general recreation, facilities include multi-sports courts, adventure golf, adventure playgrounds, water zorbing, high ropes courses, funfair, inflatable castles/pillows, and go-karts. Minehead resort also offers bumper boats, donkey rides, use of the adjacent golf course, and "Exmoor Adventures" country leisure pursuits. An additional charge usually applies for most of these activities, although the funfair is free.

Skegness and Bognor resorts each have a spa complex for massage, swimming, facials and other popular spa treatments.

=== Children's activities ===
There are a number of attractions and facilities at each resort provided especially for younger children. These include playgrounds, a supervised arts and crafts room, "Bob's Yard" (miniature funfair), a "Junior driving school" with small go-karts for children, and a nursery which can care for children and keep them entertained whilst parents enjoy other activities in the resort.

== Bognor Regis ==
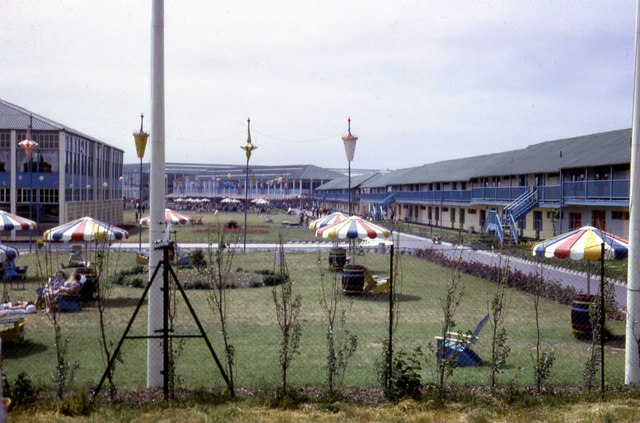
Butlins Bognor Regis in 1962

Butlins Bognor opened in 1960. The camp later became known as Southcoast World until 1998 and is now known as Butlins Bognor Regis Resort. In 1999 it was renovated again with the construction of a Skyline Pavilion. In 2005, a new £10m hotel called "The Shoreline" was unveiled at the Bognor Regis resort. A second hotel "The Ocean" opened on the site in Summer 2009 and general landscaping and upgrading also took place. In July 2012 a third hotel "The Wave" hotel was opened to guests.

== Minehead ==
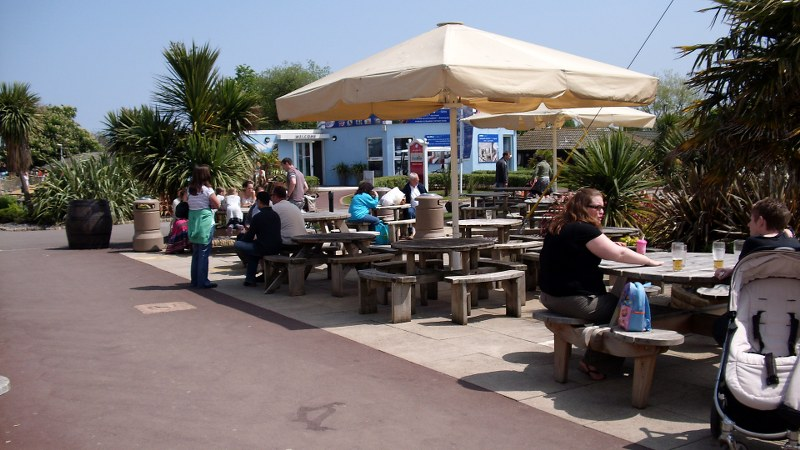
A typical scene at Butlins Minehead, October 2010

Butlins Minehead was opened to the public on 26 May 1962. It underwent substantial renovation in the 1980s, being renamed Somerwest World. In 1998 it was renovated again with the construction of a Skyline Pavilion. Since 1999 the Minehead resort has undergone further aesthetic upgrades. However, most of the original buildings remain, including almost all the original chalets. As such Minehead is now the last remaining Butlins camp that is still largely as Sir Billy designed it. Minehead is the largest resort out of the three remaining open parks.

== Mosney ==
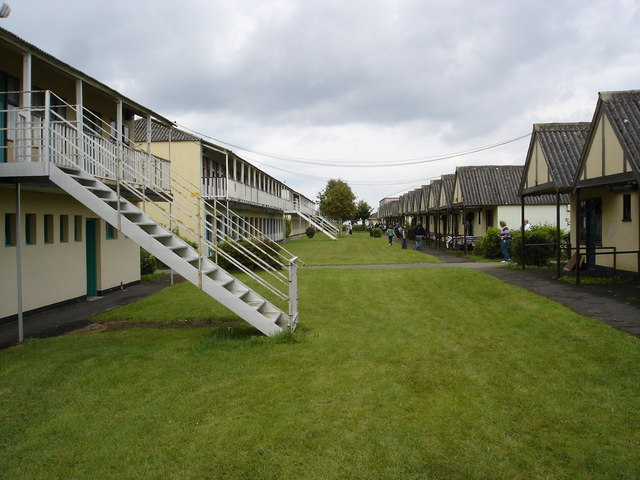
Butlins Mosney, County Meath, Ireland was the first camp to be built outside Great Britain. It was sold in 1982.

Mosney was the first Butlins camp outside the UK. The camp opened in 1948, occupying some 200 acres (0.81 km2) of a former country estate. In 1982, Butlins sold the camp, which was renamed Mosney Holiday Centre. The camp continued without substantive changes, however, the last season for Mosney was 2000. Dwindling visitor numbers and problems finding staff for the short 12-week season eventually led to the camp's closure. In December 2000 a five-year deal was signed with the government to turn Mosney into a refugee centre. Mosney is now home to 700 refugees from over 20 countries. Like Minehead, most of the original buildings remain, including all the original chalets. Mosney is the only camp that has changed little since it was opened.

== Skegness ==
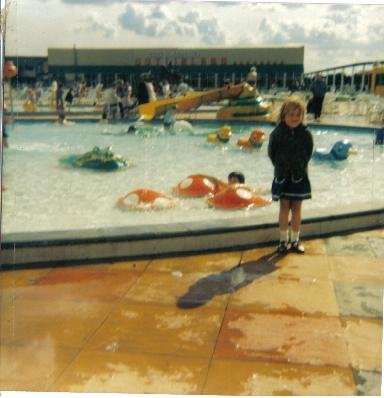
Butlins Skegness funpool 1987

Butlins Skegness was the first of Billy Butlin's holiday camps. The camp opened in 1936 but was taken over for military use in 1939, and known as HMS Royal Arthur. The camp reopened to holidaymakers in 1946. In 1987 the site underwent renovation with the construction of a modern fun pool and modernised accommodation, at this time the site was renamed Funcoast World. In 1998 it was renovated again with the construction of a Skyline Pavilion and since that time has undergone further improvements and maintenance.

In 2011 the resort underwent more development with the introduction of a new guest catering restaurant called The Deck and a new Italian styled restaurant called Ludo's. In 2013 the new Splash Waterworld opened, adding a new pool area to the resort. Plans have recently been submitted to modernise the resort once again with further investment into new restaurants and stores.

== Barry Island ==
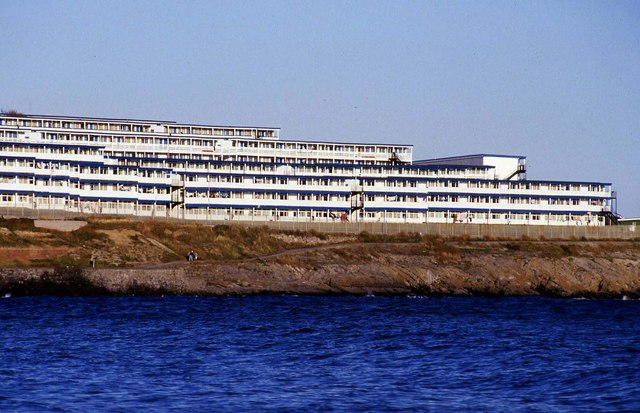
View from beach at Barry Island showing chalets.

Butlins Barry Island was the last of Billy Butlin's holiday camps. The camp opened in 1966 and closed 20 years later. It was sold to Majestic Holidays in 1987 and renamed to Majestic Barry Island.

== Ayr ==
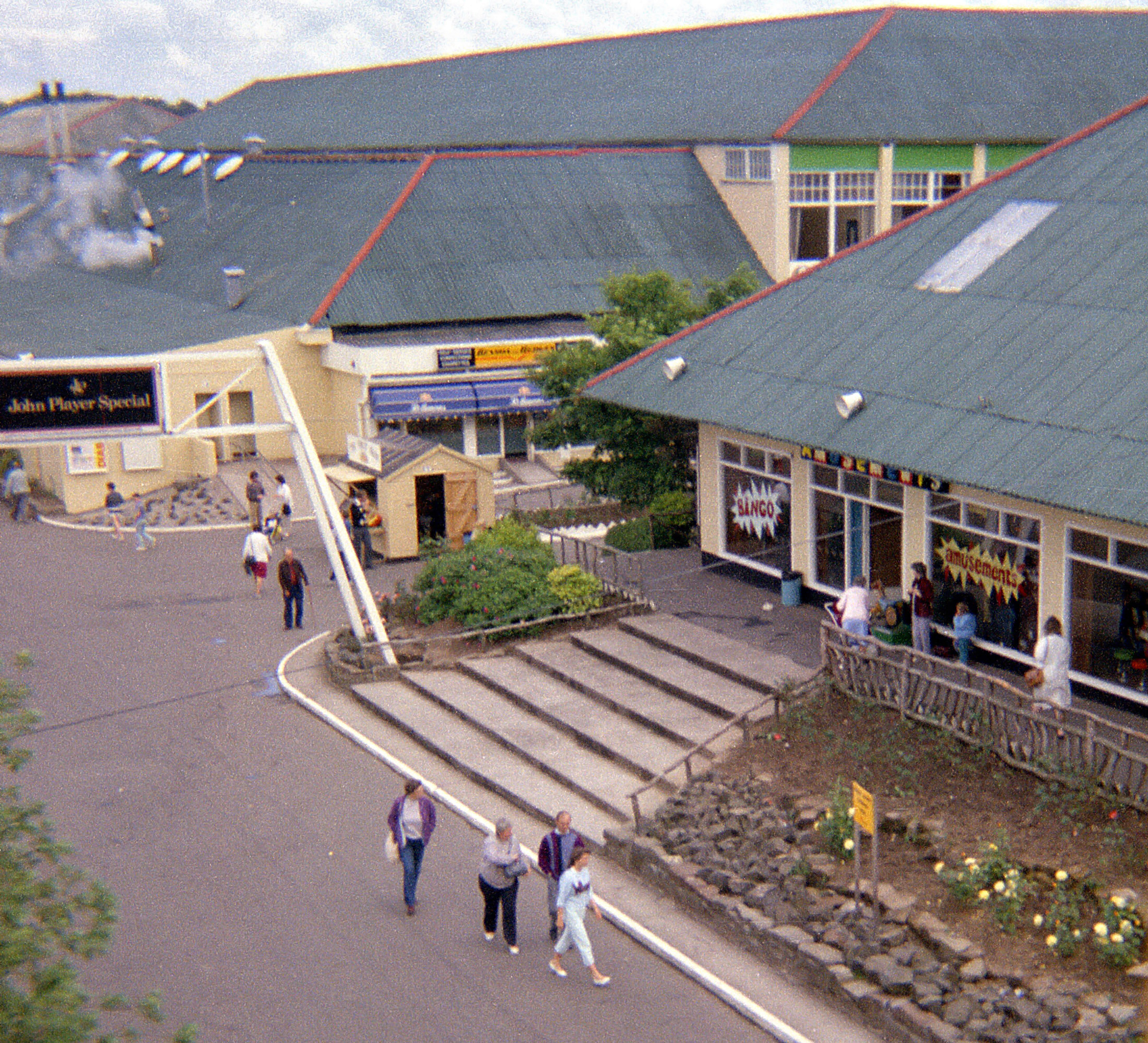
Butlins Ayr, seen during the mid-1980s before refurbishment.

Butlins Ayr was built by Billy Butlin as a naval training camp in 1940. The camp opened to the public in 1946.

In 1948 Butlin also opened a hotel on the site and a railway station serving the camp. In 1987 a refurbishment saw the camp re-branded Wonderwest World and the creation of a new indoor fun-pool along with modernised accommodation.

The site was re-branded to sister company Haven Holidays in 1999 and renamed Craig Tara. Since then, the focus has moved to replacing the original chalets with static caravans.

== Pwllheli ==
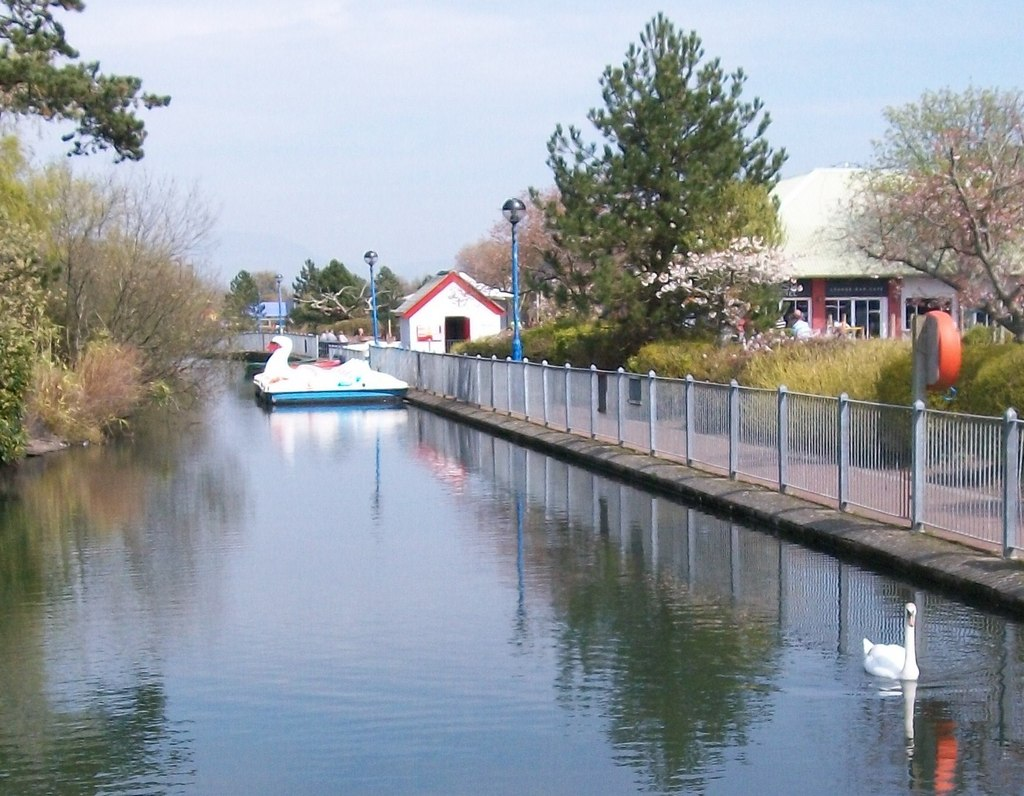
View across boating pond at Butlins Pwllheli.

Butlins Pwllheli was built by Billy Butlin as a naval training camp in 1940. After the war, the camp opened to the public in 1947. In 1987 a refurbishment saw the camp renamed Starcoast World and the creation of a new indoor fun-pool along with modernised accommodation. In 1999 the site was re-branded to sister company Haven Holidays and renamed Hafan Y Môr..

== Butlins Park ==
In an early use of the name, in 1932 Billy Butlin opened an amusement park called Butlins Park at Littlehampton on the site of the old east bank fort and windmill. It is currently known as Harbour Park.

== West End, Grand Bahama ==
Butlin Bahamas Limited submitted a plan to build a vacation village near West End on the island of Grand Bahama, one of the Islands of Bahamas. The plan was approved by the colony's House of Assembly in August 1948. The village was intended to be open for six months of each year and initially to accommodate 1000 guests but to be expanded to accommodate 2000. An electricity sub-station was opened to provide for the village. In late 1949, Butlin also purchased the airline company Nassau Aviation.

In 1950, the village attracted 18,363 guests. However, it closed shortly afterwards.

== Music weekends ==
Butlins music weekends are over 18s only and are offered regularly across all of the three resorts. Each weekend has a different musical theme, including soul music, alternative, folk, disco, and rock and blues. They also have decade themed weekends from the 1960s to the 2000s. Butlins Music Weekends have played host to big-name acts such as Beverley Knight, Rick Astley, Toyah and many others. Madness have also held three weekends in Minehead on their House of Fun tour, taking over the whole resort for the weekend.

=== All Tomorrow's Parties ===
All Tomorrow's Parties was a music festival which takes place at Minehead. Named after the song "All Tomorrow's Parties" by the Velvet Underground, it was an alternative to larger mainstream festivals and was presented in a more intimate environment than a giant stadium or huge country field. All Tomorrow's Parties was a sponsorship-free festival where the organisers and artists stay in the same accommodation as the fans.

=== Bloc Weekend ===
Bloc Weekend is an annual music festival, devoted to electronic music of several genres, and incorporates both DJ sets and live shows. The first two Bloc events took place at Pontin's holiday camp in Norfolk. The 2009 event, which took place during 13–15 March, was moved to the larger Minehead resort. The 5,000 capacity event still sold out before the festival began. In 2010 and 2011, Bloc returned to Minehead for another sold-out show.

== Butlins and Dodgem Cars ==
Dodgem Cars, a brand of bumper cars, were manufactured in the US by Dodgem Cars Ltd. Billy Butlin saw them and obtained the UK franchise. As a result, a Skegness funfair owned by Billy Butlin saw the first Dodgems cars in the UK in 1923.

== Butlins Beaver Club on the radio ==
In 1956 Butlins Beaver Club – with Uncle Eric Winstrone was heard in the United Kingdom and much of continental Europe on Sunday nights at 6:00 pm over the 208 m wavelength of Radio Luxembourg.

== Reds TV ==
The origins of the in-house TV system began in 1995 when Butlins decided to make use of the then 'empty' fifth channel (Channel 5 was still two years away from its launch). A teletext system was installed, together with a backing of incidental music, overseen by Redcoat/Stage Manager Tony Filer – and piped through to the guests' chalets to provide first an alternative, then an accompaniment to the printed programme of events. Filer (now a successful radio producer) installed a video camera in the new 'studio' to enable visiting celebrity interviews and 'Know your Redcoats' discussions to be shown. The Butlins 'Channel 5' name was changed to 'BTV' a year before the new fifth terrestrial TV channel launched – and later became known as 'Reds TV'.

== Publicity ==
=== Butlins badges ===
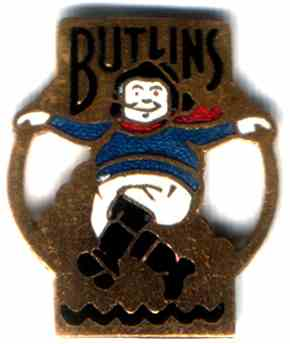
Butlins Badge Skegness 1938

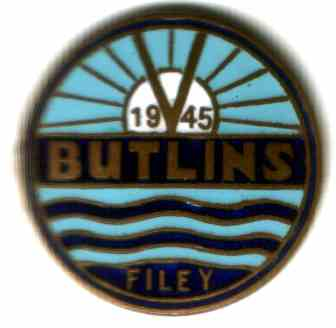
Butlins Badge Filey 1945

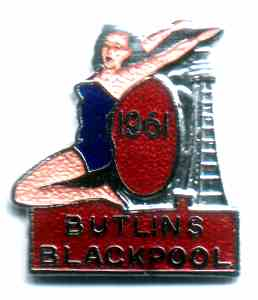
Butlins Badge Blackpool 1961

From 1936 until 1967, on arrival at Butlins each camper was issued with an enamel badge unique to that camp or hotel, to wear for the duration of their holiday. The badge granted the camper readmission to the site should they take a trip out during their stay. Each camp had at least one badge each year, with most of the larger camps having several colour variations throughout the season for improved security. Occasionally, two different designs would be used in one season.

The badges were made of die-stamped metal (usually brass), highly polished or chrome plated with the brightly coloured design made of vitreous enamel using a process similar to Champlevé but the troughs being stamped in rather than carved.

Each badge was handmade by jewellery manufacturers in London, Dublin or in Birmingham's 'Jewellery Quarter'. It was the practice for some campers to keep badges from previous holidays and wear them all on a ribbon. Some have become collector's items. Additional badges included 'Second Week' badges, Staff badges, 'Concessionaire' badges (for visiting tradesmen – these badges are distinguished by the absence of enamel), Committee badges, Christmas badges, Beaver Club badges, Reunion badges and many others.

Badges were not issued during Second World War years of 1940 to 1945 as the camps were taken over by the government and used as accommodation for war service personnel.

Notable badges include 'Skegness 1936' (the first badge issued) and 'Filey 1945', which features the 'V for Victory' in its design and is an exception to the gap of the war years as the camp was the first to reopen after the war just in time for the end of the season in August 1945.

The Barry Island 1965 is particularly rare, as the badges were manufactured but never issued, due to the camp not opening that year as planned.

In 2004, Butlins has again begun selling similar style badges in their on-resort souvenir shops. Some of these are of a more modern design, whilst some are close or exact replicas of badges from Butlins earlier days. The current badges, however, serve no purpose in identifying guests and are available purely as nostalgic souvenirs. Many regular guests like to swap badges with Butlins staff, who often have special badges to swap which are not otherwise available to guests. The badge collection ribbons are also sold in Butlins shops and may be used to pin multiple badges to.

Members of the Premier Club (Butlins loyalty club for regular guests) receive a free badge each time they visit, with a new design given each year.

=== Slogans ===
Throughout most of its history, Butlins has regularly advertised using various media. Examples of slogans include:

- Early slogans from the 1930s to 1950s included "Our True Intent Is All For Your Delight", "A weeks holiday for a weeks pay", "Holidays are Jollidays" and "Holidays with pay. Holidays with play!"
- 1960s "You'll have a really wonderful time at Butlins by the sea"
- 1970s "Butlinland is Freedomland" and "A holiday that's out of this world" (well known campaign that featured two blue-skinned alien characters called Toot and Ploot in various Butlin's locations).
- Early 1980s "A little bit of this, and quite a lot of that"
- Mid 1980s "Butlin it once and you'll do it again!"
- 1990s "Let yourself go, and you won't want to leave" and "No.1 for family fun"
- Approx 1999–2002 "Come to life. Come to Butlins"
- Approx 2002–2004 "A million holidays. One Butlins"
- 2005–2007 "Kids love it"
- 2007–2009 "Altogether More Fun"
- 2010 "Isn't it time you came round to Butlins?"
- 2011 "Happy Days" then "Happiness is..."
- 2012 to 2014 "Our True Intent Is All For Your Delight" (a return to the very first, William Shakespeare-inspired slogan used by Sir Billy Butlin)
- 2014 to 2020 "Butlins by the sea" same as the 1960s slogan with 'Our True Intent Is All For Your Delight' still very much in use around resort and for staff training
- 2020 "Ready to Butlins"

== Butlins in popular culture ==
The 1947 film Holiday Camp was filmed mainly on location at Butlins Filey, although the establishing shot was of Butlins Skegness.

The 1965 film Every Day's a Holiday was filmed on location at Butlin's Clacton, although most of the film was filmed on the camp, including scenes in the Crazy Horse Saloon and Fairground, additional scenes were filmed at Elstree Studios and along Clacton-on-Sea beach and seafront.

During the 1980s the BBC produced a sitcom called Hi-de-Hi! set in "Maplin's", a farcical holiday camp loosely styled on Butlins. Its writers (Jimmy Perry and David Croft) had themselves been Redcoats at Butlins. A later documentary series called Redcoats followed Redcoats through their seasons at Butlins.

In the film version of The Who's Tommy (1975) there is a 'Bernie's Holiday Camp' where Tommy's mother meets her new husband. The staff are also called green coats, which is a reference to Butlins' Redcoats.

Butlins is mentioned in the lyrics of the song "Stay Free" on Give 'Em Enough Rope, the second album by The Clash.

The 1987 Doctor Who TV serial "Delta and the Bannermen" was filmed mainly at the Butlins camp on Barry Island, Wales. The camp is referred to as the 'Shangri-La' holiday camp, run by 'Burton'.

=== Books ===
Many books have been written about Butlins and its history, and about the life of Sir Billy Butlin. Some of these are:

- Read, Sue (1986). Hello Campers!. Bantam Press. ISBN 0-593-01039-6.
- Butlin, Sir Billy (1993). The Billy Butlin Story – A Showman to the End. Robson Books. ISBN 0-86051-864-7.
- North, Rex (1962). The Butlin Story. Jarrolds.
- May, James (2010). How to Land an Airbus A330 (In his book, May describes how one would go about escaping from a Butlins Holiday Camp). Hodder Paperbacks. ISBN 978-0-340-99458-0.

There have also been a number of children's fiction books which include Butlins as a location or an integral part of the story. For example:

- Richards, Frank (1961). Billy Bunter at Butlins. Cassell.
- Creasey, John (1954). The Toff at Butlins. London: Hodder and Stoughton.

== See also ==
- Haven Holidays
- HIT Entertainment
- Holiday camp
- Pontin's
- Redcoats (Butlins)
- Resort
