= Butlin's Clacton =

Former holiday camp in Clacton-on-Sea, England

Clacton

- Location within Essex
- Location: Clacton-on-Sea
- Coordinates: 51.7812°N 1.1388°E
- Established: 11 June 1938
- Closed: 23 September 1983

Butlin's Clacton was a holiday camp located in Clacton-on-Sea in England. It opened in 1938 and closed in 1983.

== History ==
Clacton-on-Sea is the largest town on the Tendring Peninsula in Essex and was founded in 1871. It is a seaside resort that attracted many tourists in the summer months between the 1950s and 1970s, but like many other British seaside resorts went into decline as a holiday destination since holidays abroad became more affordable.

In 1936 Billy Butlin made moves to create a new holiday camp there, by buying and refurbishing the West Clacton Estate, an amusement park to the west of the town. After gaining the support of the local council, construction began and the camp opened on 11 June 1938.

During the War years, all the Butlin's camps were requisitioned by the Government. Clacton was originally planned to be used as a POW camp, but it was spared this indignity and was used as a training site for the pioneer corps. However, during its occupation, the camp suffered significant damage and substantial repairs had to be carried out to put the camp back into operation. It reopened to the public in 1946. In 1972, the Butlin's organisation was bought by the Rank Group.

The Clacton camp was open until 1983 when due to package holidays and changing tastes, the holiday camp was closed and sold to a group of former departmental managers at the camp who reopened it as a short-lived theme park called Atlas Park. Atlas Park only lasted a year and the land was then sold and redeveloped with housing.
