= Haven Holidays =

Holiday, caravan park and campsite operator

Haven Leisure Limited
- Type: Private
- Traded as: Haven
- Industry: Leisure
- Predecessor: British Holidays; Warner Holiday Camps; Ladbroke Holidays
- Founded: 1964; 62 years ago
- Headquarters: 1 Park Lane, Hemel Hempstead, Hertfordshire, HP2 4YL, United Kingdom
- Number of locations: 41 Caravan Holiday Parks; 1 Cottage Resort
- Area served: England, Scotland & Wales
- Key people: Simon Palethorpe (chief executive)
- Products: Caravan Holiday Parks; Holiday Home Sales
- Revenue: ▲£271.1 million (2013)
- Operating income: ▲£35.2 million (2013)
- Net income: ▲£25.6 million (2013)
- Number of employees: ~14,000 to 16,000 (2026)
- Parent: Bourne Leisure Limited
- Website: www.haven.com

Haven Leisure Limited (formally Haven Holidays) is a company operating a chain of holiday parks in the United Kingdom. It operates self-catering static caravan holiday parks with many also including touring and camping facilities. The company operates 38 sites in the UK in predominantly coastal locations.

The company was established in 1964 and bought by the Bourne Leisure Group in 2000. In November 2004, Bourne Leisure merged its existing British Holidays chain into the Haven Holidays brand. Bourne Leisure was sold to the Blackstone Group in January 2021.

== History ==
The current Haven chain is formed from a number of acquisitions by its former brands, including Warner Holiday Camps (now trading as Warner Hotels). By 1992, all the self-catering Warner Camps were under the Haven banner. Even though most Haven Parks were self-catering, full board and half board were available at Caister and Duporth. By 1996, Haven had reached 49 holiday parks under its banner and parks divided into three different categories; All Action Centres, Family Parks and Character Villages. Five parks now offered full and half-board holidays: Caister, (the only All Action Centre to so), Mill Rythe, Harcourt Sands, Lyme Bay and Duporth.

By 2000, the number of Haven Holiday Parks had reached 56; by this time, there were now only three parks that offered just half board holidays: Caister, Hafan Y Mor and Craig Tara. Parks now came under four categories and were defined by four different colours, All Action Parks (red), Lively Parks (blue), Leisurely Parks (yellow) and Relaxing Parks (green); these colours formed part of the ribbon logo introduced in 1999. Part of the ribbon was then replaced between 2004 and 2007 by the British Holidays logo as Haven and British Holidays began to merge. Each holiday park category would reflect what type of entertainment and activities would take place at park and also reflect the park's size. After deciding to focus more on its gaming operations such as Mecca Bingo, the Rank Group decided to sell its holiday arm. In October 2000, Bourne Leisure purchased part of the Rank Group's UK leisure arm, Rank Leisure, for £700 million, which included Haven and its sister brand Haven Europe (now known as Siblu), Butlins, Warner Hotels and Oasis Forest Holiday Villages, which were sold to Center Parcs.

Haven is known for its entertainment under the slogan of 'Haven Entertains'. There were entertainers at all parks, the number of which depended on the size of the park. Its resident entertainers were known as Havenmates, and were famous for their stripped deckchair design jackets. After the sale of Haven to Bourne Leisure in 2000, the entertainers were renamed Funstars, the same name given to the entertainers at British Holidays camps. Bradley Bear was also introduced to the Tiger Club, and Rory and Bradley's Funtime was introduced. Over recent years, the Entertainment branding has undergone further changes, with the introduction of Haven Theatre Company, when Thornwick Bay opened with a number of larger parks adopting this branding, while other parks retained the Funstar branding. Recently, this has been changed to Entertainment Cast and Animation Hosts. As part of a £110 million investment into leisure facilities, more modern flexible spaces were introduced, with Entertainment Venues becoming Marina Bar and Stages, unfortunately reducing the amount of entertainment venues on offer.

Following the purchase of Haven by Bourne Leisure, Haven decided to restructure both Haven and British Holidays and sold off many of their smaller holiday parks. Twelve of these smaller parks which were subject to a management buyout and went on to form a new holiday company; Park Resorts, while other parks were sold to Parkdean Holidays and Park Holidays UK, with Park Resorts and Parkdean later merging themselves to form Parkdean Resorts. Haven and British Holidays both retained their larger parks and Bourne Leisure began integrating them from 2002 onwards, trading entertainment and facilities between the two brands. Haven adopted much of the standardised branding used by British Holidays for its facilities since 1997; such as FunWorks (main entertainment complexes), ShowBar (live entertainment clubs) SplashZone (indoor and outdoor pools), SportZone (outdoor sports areas), FoodWorks (fast food outlets) and Oasis (table service restaurants) with some of this branding still used at some parks. The two companies eventually merged in November 2004 under the name 'Haven and British Holidays'. Due to Haven being the better known name, the British Holidays identity was eventually dropped completely by the end of the 2007 season.

=== The Tiger Club ===
Before the start of the 2026 season it was announced that the Tiger Club would return to Haven parks. It is set to return as a show format but bringing back the famous Tiger Club song and dance.

=== Seasiders ===
In 1996, Haven was the focus of a Channel 4 fly-on-the-wall documentary series called Seasiders. The series was filmed over the 1995 season and broadcast in 1996. The series follows the ups and downs of the Havenmate team at Primrose Valley from Auditions to National Finals at the end of the season. The series also featured other departments on the park, but primarily focused on the Havenmates for the season.

== Acquisitions ==
In 2007, Bourne Leisure purchased Far Grange Park & Golf Club. The park was initially a Haven site for both holidaymakers and caravan owners, as seen in the 2008 brochure. However, after just one season, the park became owners only.

In April 2015, Bourne Leisure purchased the Thornwick & Sea Farm Holiday Centre and Greenacre West caravan parks from Flamborough Holidays Ltd; Thornwick & Sea Farm holiday centre's complex was redeveloped for the 2016 season and was rebranded 'Thornwick Bay'.

In 2019, Haven ventured into a new type of resort with the purchase of Celtic Haven Spa Holiday Cottage Resort in Tenby, Pembrokeshire, Wales. The Resort has 30 onsite self-catering cottages, an Elemis Spa, an indoor swimming pool with entertainment and marine facilities shared with its sister park, Lydstep Beach Holiday Village. Both resorts are situated in the village of Lydstep and Celtic Haven resort is the first in the Haven brand to operate 365 days a year. As of 2026 Celtic Haven is now fully merged with Lydstep Beach and now known as Lydstep Beach "The Cottages".

It was announced on 23 February 2022 that Haven had completed the acquisition of its first park since being taken over by Blackstone; a previously family-run site in Skegness named Richmond Holiday Centre, which, since the 2023 season, has been renamed Skegness Holiday Park. The park offers more than 700 pitches of accommodation, a swimming pool and entertainment venues and restaurants, and is located not far from Skegness Beach. It is also Haven's first Holiday Park in Skegness since owning Coastfield.

On 13 March 2024, it was announced that Haven had purchased Holivans Caravan Park in Mablethorpe, Lincolnshire. The park is situated next door to current Haven park Golden Sands and will form part of the park's expansion. Once both parks are joined, they will form one of the biggest holiday parks in the region. The acquisition forms part of Haven's growth strategy, reflecting the company's confidence in the UK's domestic tourism market. Development work started on the park in Winter 2024 and will complement the £10 million already invested into the park.

Haven announced on 25 September 2026, the Blackstone Group had acquired Seal Bay Resort in Selsey, West Sussex, to add to the Haven Portfolio. The award-winning resort boasts over 2,500 pitches, and will take Haven's number of parks to 40. The resort will operate under its current name and owner Cove Communities until the end of the 2026 season before transitioning to the Haven brand for the 2027 season.

== Sponsorships and partnerships ==
In March 2018, Haven partnered with the charity Royal National Lifeboat Institution (RNLI).

In February 2019, Haven became an official sponsor of Team GB, supporting the team in the build up to the Tokyo 2020 Olympic Games.

== Mascots ==
Haven currently has six mascots under the name “Seaside Squad” aimed to entertain younger guests. These mascots are known as Rory, Annie, George, Jaz, DJ Ned and Polly.

The mascots take part in shows in the entertainment venues during the day and the evening. The Seaside Squad also participate in meet and greets with guests at other times during the day such as at Breakfast in the site restaurants and photo opportunities in the entertainment venues.

In August 2022, Haven announced that the 'Seaside Squad' would be rebranded for the next season, with the characters performing their first show, beginning from 1 October 2022. Rory remained, but was redesigned; Anxious is now called Annie (her real name) and was also redesigned; Greedy is now known as George (his real name) and received the biggest redesign in which his fur was recoloured blue; and Bradley Bear was replaced by his niece, Jaz. In a letter on the Haven website, it was further explained that Bradley Bear was moving to Florida. Their ages have also been revealed: Rory is 14, Jaz is 13, Annie is 12 and George is 11. They have also been given new voices. Two of the four voice actors are unknown, but Annie has a Yorkshire accent instead of her original American accent, Jaz has a Midlands accent, Rory has a Cockney accent instead of his original American accent, and George still has a Scottish accent, but is voiced by a different actor, namely Aaron Spendelow. The character of Annie is voiced by singer and impressionist Jess Robinson. Many regular holidaymakers wished that the change was more gradual. A petition to keep the characters the same has gathered over 3,576 signatures and is still active today.

=== Current mascots ===
- Rory the Tiger (1988–present) (voiced by Mark Lewis Jones)
- George the Gorilla (1991–present) (formerly known as Greedy the Gorilla until 2022) (voiced by David Holt, Aaron Spendelow)
- Annie the Elephant (1991–present) (formerly known as Anxious the Elephant until 2022) (voiced by Debra-Andrew Oliver, Maria Darling, Jess Robinson)
- Jaz Bear (2022–present)
- DJ Ned (2000–present) (formerly known as Naughty Ned until 2010) (voiced by Fogwell Flax, Mark Lewis Jones)
- Polly Popkins (1998–present) (voiced by Debra-Andrew Oliver, Maria Darling, Camilla Rockley)

=== Former mascots ===
- Bradley Bear (1993–2022) (voiced by Fogwell Flax, Marc Silk) (originally British Holidays)
- Sylvester the Snake (1990–2009)
- Manic the Parrot (1990–2009)
- Magical Merlin the Wizard (2001–2009) (originally British Holidays)
- Prudence the Giraffe (1991–2004)
- Sailor Sue (1998–2000) (originally British Holidays)
- Tommy the Soldier (1998–2000) (originally British Holidays)
- Rooster the Hillbilly (2000–2002) (originally British Holidays)

== Holiday parks and resorts ==
There are currently 38 Haven parks in the United Kingdom.

The number of Haven parks peaked at 56 in 1999, not long before their merger with British Holidays in 2002; however, many of the smaller parks owned by both chains were sold off throughout 2001 and again in October 2004, in a move that Haven said was to improve the standards of its larger and more profitable parks.

=== Current Haven parks ===
- Blackpool: Cala Gran, Marton Mere
- Cornwall: Perran Sands, Riviere Sands
- Devon: Devon Cliffs
- Dorset: Littlesea, Rockley Park, Seaview, Weymouth Bay
- Essex: The Orchards
- Kent and Sussex: Kent Coast (formerly Allhallows), Church Farm, Combe Haven, Seal Bay Resort
- Lake District: Lakeland
- Lincolnshire: Golden Sands, Cleethorpes Beach (formerly Thorpe Park), Skegness Holiday Park (2023)
- Norfolk: Caister-on-Sea, Hopton, Seashore, Wild Duck
- Northumberland: Berwick, Haggerston Castle
- Scotland: Craig Tara, Seton Sands
- Somerset: Burnham-on-Sea, Doniford Bay
- Wales: Greenacres, Cardigan View (a sister park to Greenacres), Garreg Wen (a sister park to Greenacres), Hafan y Môr, Lydstep Beach, Lydstep Beach "The Cottages" (formerly Celtic Haven), Kiln Park, Penally Court (a sister park to Kiln Park), Presthaven, Quay West
- Yorkshire: Blue Dolphin, Primrose Valley, Reighton Sands, Thornwick Bay, Far Grange (owners only)

=== Parks owned by British Holidays before 2004 ===
- Blackpool: Cala Gran, Marton Mere
- Dorset: Rockley Park
- Essex: The Orchards
- Kent and Sussex: Kent Coast (formerly Allhallows), Church Farm
- Lake District: Lakeland
- Lincolnshire: Cleethorpes Beach (formerly Thorpe Park)
- Norfolk: Hopton
- Northumberland: Berwick, Haggerston Castle
- Scotland: Seton Sands
- Somerset: Burnham-on-Sea
- Wales: Greenacres, Lydstep Beach, Kiln Park, Penally Court, Quay West

=== Former and closed holiday parks (both Haven and British Holidays) ===
- Cornwall: Duporth, St. Minver, Trelawne Manor, St Ives, Mullion
- Devon: Bideford Bay, Challaborough Bay, Lyme Bay, South Bay, Torquay, Devon Valley
- Dorset: Chesil Beach, Sandhills, Warmwell, West Bay
- Essex: St. Osyth Beach (formerly Bel Air), Steeple Bay
- Hampshire: Mill Rythe, Solent Breezes
- Isle of Wight: Harcourt Sands, Lower Hyde, Nodes Point, Thorness Bay, Fort Warden
- Kent and Sussex: Alberta, Sheerness, Ashcroft, Winchelsea Sands
- Lancashire: Beacon Fell View
- Lincolnshire: Coastfield
- Norfolk: California Cliffs, Heacham Beach, Cherry Tree
- Northumberland: Riverside
- Scotland: Wemyss Bay, Erigmore House, Sundrum Castle, Grannies Heilan Hame, Tummel Valley, Nairn Lochloy
- Suffolk: Felixstowe Beach, Suffolk Sands, Kessingland Beach
- Wales: Brynowen, Carmarathen Bay, Manorbier, Pendine Sands, Tŷ Mawr, Lido Beach
- Yorkshire: Barmston Beach, Cayton Bay, Whitby
