= Bourne Leisure =

British private company

Bourne Leisure Holdings Limited
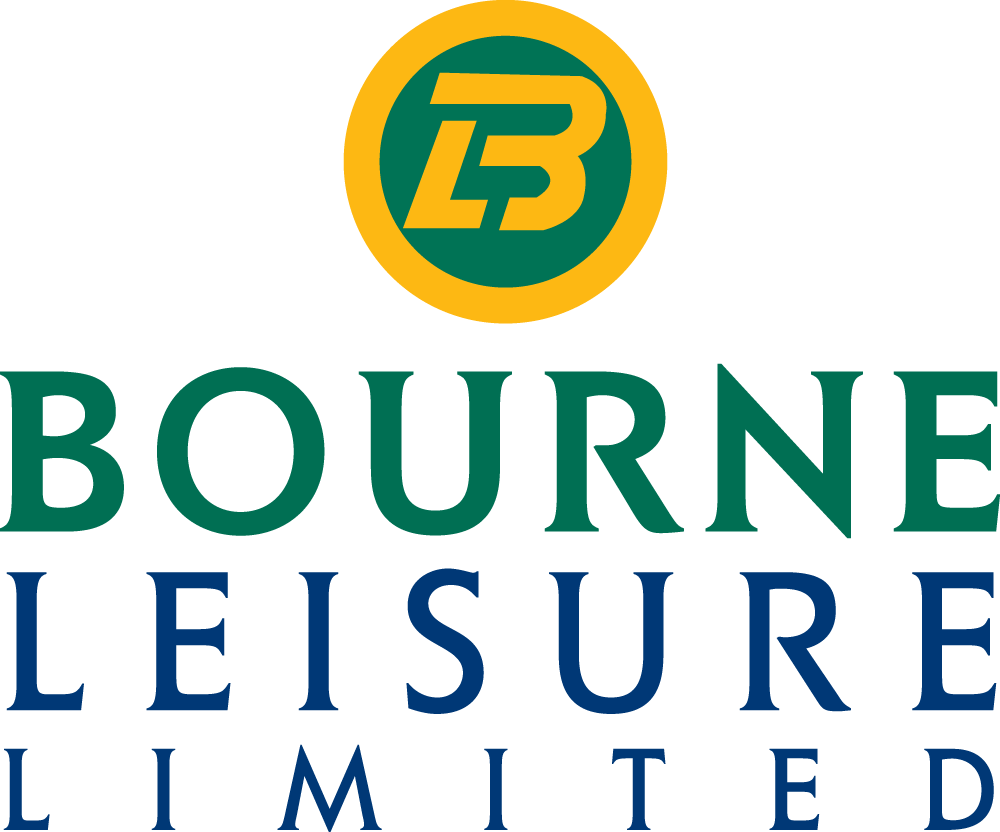
- Type: Private
- Industry: Leisure / Holidays
- Founded: 1964 (original predecessor company)
- Founders: Peter Harris, David Allen, John Cook
- Headquarters: Hemel Hempstead, Hertfordshire, UK
- Number of locations: 38 Caravan Parks; 13 Leisure Hotels; 1 Cottage Resort
- Area served: UK
- Key people: Paul Flaum (CEO); Iain Stuart MacMillan
- Products: Holiday Parks; Caravan Parks; Caravan Sales; Leisure Hotels
- Revenue: ▲£951.4m (group, 2015)
- Operating income: ▲£225.0m (group, 2015)
- Net income: ▲£151.7m (group, 2015)
- Owner: Blackstone Group
- Number of employees: c.14,000 (group, 2015)
- Subsidiaries: Foray 989 Ltd. > Bourne Leisure Ltd. >> Bourne Holidays Ltd. >> Haven Leisure Ltd. >> Colaingrove Ltd. >>> Bourne Leisure Grp Ltd. >>> Evergreen Finance Ltd.
- Website: www.bourneleisuresales.co.uk, www.haven.com

Bourne Leisure Holdings Limited was a British private company which owned a number of subsidiary undertakings operating in the leisure and holiday sectors in the United Kingdom including Haven Holidays and Warner Leisure Hotels. Bourne Leisure split its main trading companies as separate legal entities in 2025.

== Company structure ==
The main trading companies in the Bourne Leisure group in the UK are:

- Haven Leisure Ltd. who operate 38 family-orientated caravan holiday parks in England, Scotland and Wales.
- Bourne Holidays Ltd. who operate 14 hotels across the UK under the Warner Leisure Hotels name, and which are exclusively for adults. Many of the Warner Leisure Hotels properties are country house hotels, including Alvaston Hall, Bodelwyddan Castle, Cricket St Thomas, Holme Lacey House, Littlecote House, Nidd Hall, and Thoresby Hall.

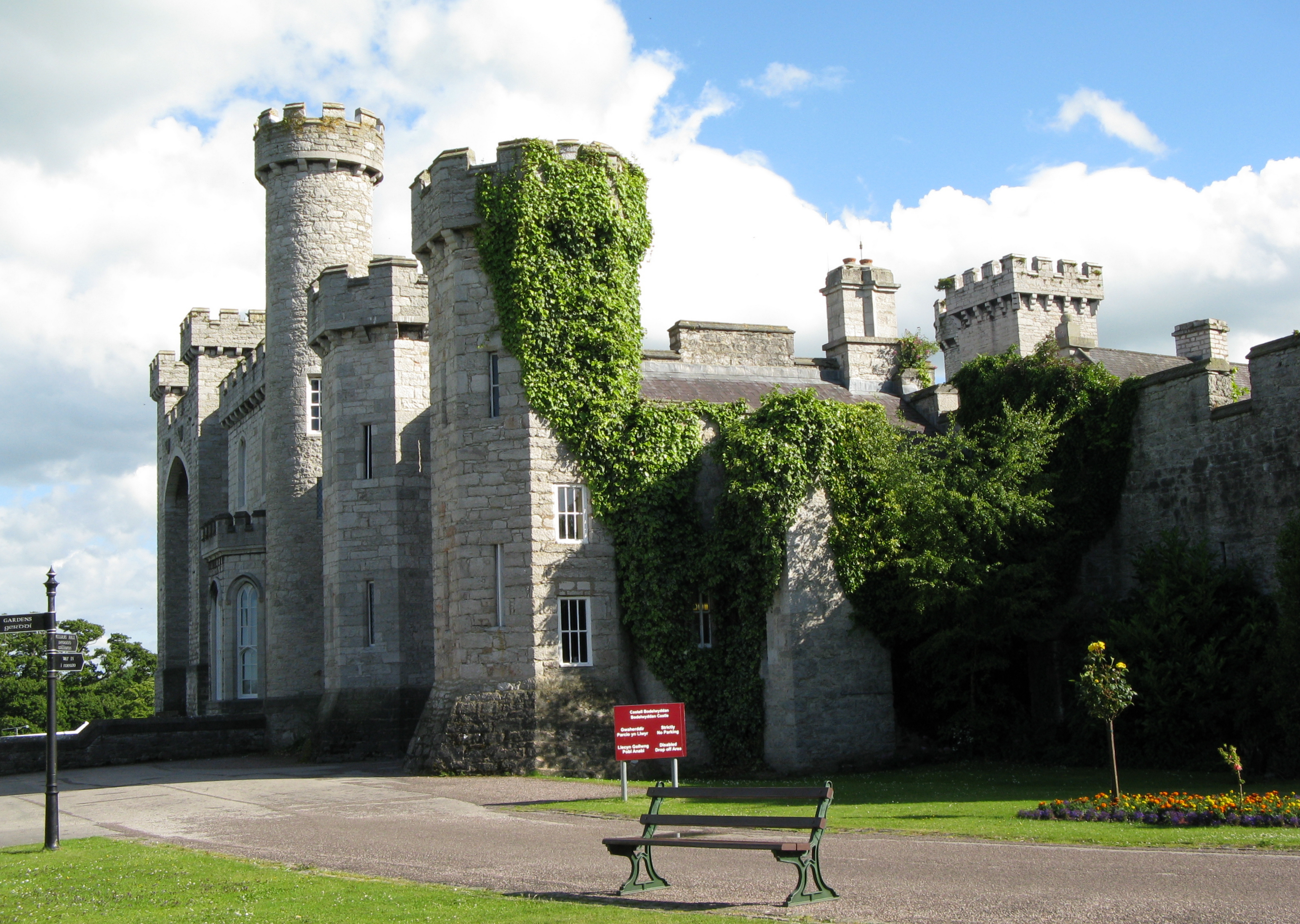
Part of Bodelwyddan Castle Hotel, a Warners Leisure Hotel near Rhyl in north Wales

The Guernsey-based fiduciary company, First Ovalap Ltd, jointly owned by the Harris, Cook and Allen families, were the majority shareholders until the majority of the share were bought by the private equity company Blackstone.

== History ==
In 1964 accountant Peter Harris, with business partner David Allen, purchased Alberta caravan park in Whitstable, Kent. A few years after this acquisition John Cook joined with Harris and Allen, and in 1972 the three entrepreneurs floated the company, Leisure Caravan Parks, on the London stock exchange. The company was subsequently acquired by Rank in 1975 for £20m. Meanwhile, Harris, Cook and Allen started over again with a new set of parks which they then expanded in October 2000 by buying The Rank Group’s holiday business. This purchase included the Haven caravan sites, the three remaining Butlins resorts, Oasis Holiday Village and Warner Leisure Hotels. The deal cost £700m and was part financed by Legal & General Ventures and Candover. The business was able to buy out these two private equity firms a few years later.

Following this major expansion of the company some sites were subsequently sold as part of a rationalization of the business. In March 2001 seven parks were sold to Premier Dawn for £15m, and soon afterwards Cinque Ports bought nine parks for £28.7m. In May 2001 twelve Haven sites were sold to Park Resorts Ltd, in a management buy-out in partnership with CBPE for £48m. In September 2001, Center Parcs acquired the Oasis Holiday Village, at Whinfell Forest, Cumbria.

In February 2004 LGV and Candover sold their 28% stake back to management in a deal that valued the firm at more than £1 billion. And in October 2004 Bourne sold a package of five sites to Parkdean Holidays for £42m. In November 2004 the company sold its European operation Haven Europe for £250m (now named Siblu).

In 2015, Bourne Leisure came fourth in the 100 Best Companies to Work For, a list generated in the UK by The Sunday Times newspaper.

In early 2021, Bourne Leisure was purchased by Blackstone. Starwood provided a loan of £1.8 billion to facilitate the purchase, which was an estimated £3 billion.

In September 2022, it was announced that Butlins had been sold by The Blackstone Group as part of a £300 million deal, to one of the original founding families of Bourne Leisure and was sold to the Harris Family Trust. The deal however does not include Butlins property assets which were sold earlier in the year to the UK's biggest private pension fund, the Universities Superannuation Scheme for and estimated £300 million.
