= Mecca Bingo =

British business enterprise operating bingo halls

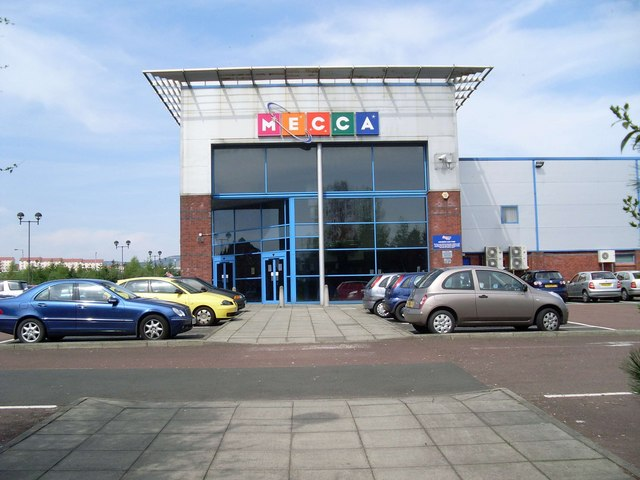
- Type: Limited company
- Industry: Gambling
- Founded: 1961
- Headquarters: Maidenhead, Berkshire, England
- Area served: United Kingdom
- Key people: John O'Reilly
- Products: Bingo clubs
- Revenue: £221.5m (2015/16)
- Net income: £32.9m (2015/16)
- Parent: The Rank Group
- Website: www.meccabingo.com

Mecca Bingo (formerly called Top Rank) is a British operator of bingo clubs, with 41 locations throughout the country. Mecca Bingo is owned by the Rank Group, which operates bingos, casinos and online gambling in Belgium, Spain and Britain. The Rank Group also own Grosvenor Casinos and Enracha. Mecca Bingo was established in 1961, and its headquarters are in Maidenhead. An extension of the Mecca Bingo brand includes meccabingo.com and a number of online game stations.

As of June 2015, Mecca Bingo's revenue was recorded at £224.4 million, with an operating profit of £28.9 million. The Rank Group reports there are one million customers who visit Mecca each year, with £65.2 million revenue generated from digital. The Mecca network currently employs more than 11,000 people across Britain. Their halls host traditional and electronic versions of bingo, including slot-style games. Mecca are licensed and regulated by the British Gambling Commission and the Alderney Gambling Control Commission.

== History ==
Eric Morley, British television host and founder of the Miss World pageant, is accredited with popularising the game of bingo in Britain during the early sixties, as a tactic to fill Britain's dance halls. In 1952, he was Mecca's general manager of dancing. He changed the company from a small catering and dancing firm into a leading entertainment and catering company. A director of the company from 1953 up until 1978, Morley left the business after a disagreement with its then parent company, Grand Metropolitan.

In 1990, the Rank Organisation made an offer of £512m to acquire Mecca Leisure Group. This was initially rejected, then accepted two months later. In 2007, Mecca Bingo and its parent company suffered significant losses, attributed to the implementation of the smoking ban in Britain. Rank shut nine Mecca Bingo clubs, with 230 people losing their jobs. In 2015, Mecca Bingo launched a marketing campaign featuring a twerking cactus. The campaign adverts helped to increase Mecca's digital sales by 18 per cent, year on year, in the 20 weeks to 17 May.

In 2022, Mecca Bingo partnered with Britain's Got Talent and became the show's official bingo partner. The deal allows Mecca Bingo to produce Britain's Got Talent-themed bingo games for their online offering and in-person venues.

== Controversies ==
In 1997, members of the Muslim community in Luton, Bedfordshire were dissatisfied with the renaming of a local bingo hall under the Mecca Bingo brand, whose name is phonetically identical with Mecca, the holiest city of Islam, a religion in which gambling is not permitted. On Christmas Day that year, bricks were thrown through the bingo hall's windows, causing £3000 of damage. Company management subsequently announced that the Mecca branding would be discontinued at the location as a result of the unrest and offence caused; as of 2018, however, the company's own branch locator on their website confirms that the location is still operating under the Mecca brand.

In December 2015, Mecca Bingo was ordered to forfeit nearly £1 million after allowing a woman to spend up to £50,000 a month on her gambling addiction.

== Awards ==
Mecca Bingo was awarded "Bingo Operator of the Year" at the 2016 International Gaming Awards. It won the same award in 2014 and 2015, with the Rank Group also winning "Socially Responsible Operator of the Year (Land Based)".

Mecca Bingo won two awards at the 2016 EGR Innovation and Marketing Awards: "Best Native App" and "Innovation in Bingo" for their Emoji Bingo game – an app that swaps bingo balls for emojis.

In 2017, Mecca Bingo won WhichBingo awards for Best Customer Services and Most Socially Responsible, along with the EGR award for Best Mobile Bingo Product.
