= Warner Leisure Hotels =

British chain of hotels

Warner Hotels
- Type: Private
- Industry: Leisure
- Predecessor: Warner Holiday Camps; Ladbroke Holidays
- Headquarters: Hemel Hempstead, Hertfordshire, England
- Area served: Great Britain
- Key people: Paul Pomroy (CEO)
- Parent: Bourne Leisure
- Website: www.warnerhotels.co.uk

Warner Hotels (formerly Warner Leisure Hotels) is a hospitality company owning 14 country and coastal properties around the UK in North Wales, Somerset, Herefordshire, Berkshire, North Yorkshire, Nottinghamshire, Isle of Wight, Suffolk, Hampshire and Warwickshire. Founded in 1932 as Warner Holiday Camps, later known as Warner Holidays and has been adult-only since 1994. In the 1990s Warner's started developing country house hotels and changing their existing 'camps' into coastal resorts and hotels.

== History ==
=== 1932–2023 ===
Captain Harry Warner (Royal Artillery Rtd) founded Warners in 1932 with the opening of the Northney Holiday Camp at Hayling Island. Further expanding by opening Coronation Holiday Camp (now known as Lakeside Coastal Village) in 1937 as well as Dovercourt in Essex, Corton in Suffolk, Minster in Kent, Seaton in Devon and Puckpool on the Isle of Wight.

After WWII Warner continued to expand with his three sons Bill, John and Alen joining the company. By the mid 1960s, they had 11 camps which rose to 14 in the 1970s. Yarmouth (now Norton Grange), Woodside Bay, Bembridge and St. Clare (sited next to Puckpool) on the Isle of Wight, Southleigh, Sinah Warren and Mill Rythe on Hayling Island and Gunton Hall near their Corton camp joined the list of holiday camps Warners run.

Warners was known for smaller camps than its main rivals Butlins and Pontins but included all the amenities expected such as swimming pools, bars, clubs and sporting activities. Changing tastes for holidays saw some sites closed and refurbished in the 1980s with Warners being sold to Grand Metropolitan in 1983, then to the Rank Group in 1987 where most of the Warner Holiday Camps were then transferred to the Haven Holidays brand, with all the Warner Self Catering parks under the Haven Holidays banner by 1992 such as Caister, Seashore, Perran Sands. Some parks were sold to external companies and others were closed altogether.

Dovercourt was used as the setting for Hi-de-Hi! in the 1980s before closing along with Minster, Woodside Bay, Southleigh and Northney camps. Coronation Holiday Camp was renamed Lakeside, and Seaton Holiday Camp was merged with the neighbouring Blue Waters Camp to become Lyme Bay Holiday Camp. Puckpool and St Clare merged and renamed Harcourt Sands.

After initial adult-only offerings at Bembridge, Corton and Lakeside, with their other camps remaining family-orientated, Warner Holidays became adult-only in 1994. Mill Rythe, Lyme Bay and Harcourt Sands were transferred to Haven Holidays; all three were later sold. Lyme Bay and Harcourt Sands closed down in the early 2000s.

In 2000, Bourne Holidays Limited bought the Rank Group's holidays division, which consisted of the Warner, Butlins and Haven Holidays brands. Under new ownership, Warner became known for its new country house hotels and transferred its existing camps into coastal resorts with Bembridge and Sinah Warren being rebuilt as hotels. Warner's was renamed Warner Leisure Hotels, departing from its holiday camp image.

In early 2021, Bourne Leisure was acquired by The Blackstone Group.

In 2023, Warner added two hotels to its portfolio; Dalmahoy Hotel and Country Club, near Edinburgh, its first hotel in Scotland and Forest of Arden Country Club, near Birmingham. Both hotels will operate under their own management proposition, before relaunching under the Warner Hotels brand.

=== 2024–present ===
Paul Pomroy was appointed CEO of Warner on the 6 March, 2024.

On 15 July 2024 a new brand identity was unveiled by Warner. Since being bought by Blackstone in 2021, Warner has seen investment of circa £200m, refurbishing its current portfolio and adding new ones including the addition of the 180 bedroom Runnymede on Thames Hotel in Windsor, from September 2024.

== Hotel Categories ==
Warner Hotels now come under 3 different categories reflecting the ongoing investment into the resorts; Reserve, by Warner Hotels, Warner Hotels and Warner Comfort.

=== Reserve, by Warner Hotels ===
==== Thoresby Hall Hotel ====
Thoresby Hall Hotel is a Grade I-listed house on the 100-acre Thoresby Estate, in Sherwood Forest, Nottinghamshire. The hotel opened in 2000 with grounds consisting of 30 acres of gardens.

Thoresby Hall is currently being reimagined to bring it up to Reserve, by Warner standards. It will be their third resort to meet the standards of The Runnymede, with new facilities being added and coming into use from early 2026.

==== Heythrop Park ====
Built between 1705 and 1710 for Charles Talbot, Earl of Shrewsbury, gutted by fire in 1870, the house was an empty shell until railway engineer Thomas Brassey gave the house to his son Albert as a wedding gift. He hired notable Gothic revival architect Alfred Waterhouse to lead the redesign. In 1923, it became a Jesuit college before being purchased in 1969 by the National Westminster Bank as a training and conference centre. In 1999, it became the Crown Plaza before becoming a Warner Leisure Hotel, opening in 2022.

==== The Runnymede on Thames ====
The Runnymede, on the banks of the Thames in Surrey, joined Warner Hotels in 2024 after undergoing a multi-million pound refresh. The Hotel is Warner's flagship resort.

=== Warner Hotels ===
==== Alvaston Hall Hotel ====
Alvaston Hall Hotel is a half-timbered Victorian country house located near Nantwich.

In the early 1800s the property, which was then called The Grove, was sold by Crousdon Tunstall, a Quaker banker and farmer. The new owner, Francis Massey, undertook rebuilding work before the house was bought again in 1896 by Arthur Knowles, who then carried out further alterations.

==== Bembridge Coast Hotel ====
Bembridge Coast Hotel is on the eastern shore of the Isle of Wight, overlooking the Solent. The hotel was originally a house built in 1905 named Fuzze Freeze, but during World War II it was taken over by the Admiralty and named HMS Blazer. After the war, the site became a private home and then a Yellands Chalet Hotel before it was bought by Warner in 1965 and subsequently opened as an adults-only hotel in 1979.

==== Bodelwyddan Castle Hotel ====
Bodelwyddan Castle Hotel is a Grade II-listed Victorian folly in north-east Wales close to the Clwydian Mountains. The father of Sir John Williams, first baronet of Bodelwyddan, remodelled the site's original Elizabethan house and raised the mansion. Bodelwyddan Castle was developed after 1830 when battlements, extensions and internal modifications were added by Sir John's successors. The site was designed to look like a castle but was requisitioned by the army for nearby Kinmel Barracks where they used to practice trench warfare. The folly was also home to the National Portrait Gallery's Victorian collection between 1988 and 2017.

The hotel was distinct from the castle building but in mid-2021, Bourne Leisure Hotels agreed to purchase the actual castle. Bourne planned to fully refurbish the building and planned to operate it via the Warner Leisure Hotels subsidiary. The Council would retain the woodland, the meadow, a car park and the agricultural lands as well as the small lodge on the edge of the property.

==== Cricket St Thomas Hotel ====
Cricket St Thomas Hotel is a conversion of a Grade II-listed Regency mansion set in a valley in Somerset. The grounds were designed by a student of Capability Brown. The site was the home of Admiral Lord Rodney, and later Alexander Hood. The house was converted into a hotel in the late 20th century.

==== Holme Lacy House Hotel ====
Holme Lacy House Hotel is a Grade I-listed mansion located in the Wye Valley, near Hereford. The hotel has a nine-hole golf course which was redeveloped in 2014.

In 1674 John Scudamore, 2nd Viscount Scudamore built the mansion as it stands today, extending earlier houses built by his ancestors.

==== Littlecote House Hotel ====
Littlecote House Hotel in Berkshire is a Grade I-listed Tudor property with 113 acres of gardens bought by Warner in 1996.

The first Littlecote House was built by the de Calstone family in the 14th century. Their descendant, Sir George Darrel, expanded the mansion in the 1500s. It was later rebuilt by Sir John Popham in the 1590s.

Littlecote House is home to the Jerusalem Stairs, the Dutch Parlour, a secret passage behind the library bookcase, and the rooms where the D-Day landings were planned. Within the grounds are a Roman mosaic and the remains of Littlecote Roman Villa.

==== Nidd Hall Hotel ====
Nidd Hall Hotel is a grade II listed mansion near Harrogate, Yorkshire, built in the 1820s.

==== Sinah Warren Hotel ====
Sinah Warren Hotel, at Sinah, Hayling Island near Portsmouth. Originally built as a health farm it became Sinah Warren Chalet Hotel before being purchased by Warners in the 1960s. It became adults only in 1994 before a major rebuild created the present coastal hotel.

==== Studley Castle ====
Studley Castle is a 19th-century country house at Studley, Warwickshire, England. The Grade II* listed building was once owned by the Lyttleton family before being bequeathed by Philip Lyttleton to his niece Dorothy, who married Francis Holyoake.

Their son Francis Lyttleton Holyoake, the High Sheriff of Warwickshire in 1834, inherited Ribston Hall in Yorkshire from a business partner in 1833 and changed his name to Holyoake-Goodricke. The sale of the Yorkshire property financed the building of a new mansion at Studley. The new house, designed in Gothic Revival style by the architect Samuel Beazley, was completed in 1836.

The house was occupied by Studley College between 1903 and the early 1960s and was used as a horticultural training establishment for ladies. It later became offices for the British Leyland and Rover Group car companies.

In more recent times a section of the Castle was converted for use as a hotel. After a £50 million refurbishment, and the addition of a music venue, the hotel reopened in April 2019 as the 14th property in the Warner Leisure Hotels collection. An industry news item in November 2018 stated that the new hotel planned to offer "209 rooms, two restaurants, a cinema, bars and lounges, a spa, a range of outdoor pursuits to enjoy (laser clay, cycling, archery), and one of the largest live performance venues on the UK hotel scene".

=== Warner Comfort ===
==== Corton Coastal Village ====
Corton Coastal Village, in Corton, Suffolk, was originally part of the Colman Estate; at the end of the 19th century Jeremiah Colman built a house called The Clyffe. Warner bought part of the estate in 1946 and began to develop it as a modern coastal holiday village.

==== Gunton Hall Coastal Village ====
Gunton Hall Coastal Village consists of chalets and lodges. There are six "Royale" large rooms within the main building. It was built around the Grade II-listed Gunton Hall on 55 acres of grounds close to the Suffolk coastal town of Lowestoft.

Architect Matthew Brettingham designed the 18th-century manor hall. In 1810 the new owner, Thomas Fowler, built the smaller New Hall, which now serves as a reception building.

==== Lakeside ====
Lakeside consists of chalets located on the coast of Hayling Island. It opened as Coronation Holiday Camp and was renovated and renamed in the 1980s as Lakeside Holiday Centre. Lakeside is located on the edge of a lake which attracts wildlife including swans and migrating birds. Lakeside was originally called ‘Coronation’ to mark the accession in 1937 of King George VI.

==== Norton Grange Coastal Village ====
Located on the Isle of Wight, Norton Grange was built in 1760 and has been a holiday destination since the 1930s, except for a spell as an operational base for the Admiralty during World War II. Warner Leisure Hotels took ownership of the site from Yellands Chalet Hotels in 1966. It was known as Yarmouth Holiday Camp for a number of years before being renamed Norton Grange in the 1990s.

== Former sites ==
=== Mill Rythe Holiday Camp ===
Originally called Sunshine Holiday Camp, purchased in the 1980s. This site on Hayling Island is still open and owned and operated by Away Resorts. The camp was renovated and changed in the early 2020s into a caravan park.

=== Puckpool Holiday Camp and St Clare Holiday Camp ===
Puckpool was an original Warner Holiday camp. These two camps were next to each other and merged in the 1990s as Harcourt Sands. This site closed around 2006.

=== Seaton Holiday Camp ===
An original Warner camp, this merged with a neighbouring Blue Waters camp and was renamed Lyme Bay. It was used as an internment camp by the British during World War II

=== Dovercourt Bay ===
This site in Essex was used as 'Maplins' in the BBC comedy Hi-de-Hi!. This site was badly damaged in the Great Storm of 1987 and closed shortly after.

=== Minster ===
On the Isle of Sheppey, which closed in the 1980s, many buildings survive but are now privately owned.

=== Northney ===
The first Warner camp on Hayling Island. Used throughout World War Two as HMS Northney. Closed and redeveloped for housing in the 1980s.

=== Southleigh ===
On Hayling Island. An original Warner camp. It closed in the 1980s and the site was redeveloped for housing.

=== Woodside Bay ===
On the Isle of Wight, near Pontins Little Canada. Only open for less than 20 years and demolished after closure. Now the site of a holiday park.

=== Caister ===
Caister on Sea Holiday Park, near Great Yarmouth, is still operational and part of Haven Holidays.

=== Devon Coast ===
Originally called Devon Coast Country Club, this full board camp opened after the war and despite its name was actually located 1½ miles inland from the coast.

By the 1970s it was owned by Ladbrokes. Around 1990 it became a Warner Holiday Camp as an adults only camp. Following changes to Warner Holidays, it became branded as Shearings around 1992/3 but only lasted until 1994 before being closed down and the land sold for housing development.

=== Sussex Coast ===
Originally Southdean Holiday Camp. First opened in 1922 as 'New City Holiday Camp' by Sir Walter Blount on the site of an old aircraft factory in Middleton on Sea near Bognor Regis. The hangars were retained and converted into a dining hall, dance hall and indoor tennis courts. After the war, it changed hands several times and a new hotel was added. It had a number of different names over the years including Southdean, the South Coast Country Club and finally Sussex Coast holiday centre. For a time it was owned by the Dean family who had given Fred Pontin his start in 1946 by selling him their original camps at Brean Sands and Osmington Bay. In later years it was owned by Warners and then Shearings as an adults only camp. It closed in the late 1990s and the land has been redeveloped for housing.

== Self Catering Sites ==
In the 1990s former Ladbrokes holiday camps were branded as Warner Self Catering sites - many of these sites have since been sold off or closed. They were marketed as Holiday Centres and Holiday Villages.

Holiday Centres

- Caister - Norfolk (now operating under the Haven Holidays brand).
- Silver Sands - Suffolk
- Seashore - Norfolk (now operating under the Haven Holidays brand).
- Cayton Bay - Yorkshire (was operated by Haven until the management buyout post Bourne sale, now operating under the Parkdean Resorts brand).
- Carmarthen Bay - South Wales (was operated by Haven until the management buyout post Bourne sale, now operating under the Parkdean Resorts brand).
- Perran Sands - Cornwall (now operating under the Haven Holidays brand).

Holiday Villages

- Riviere Sands - Cornwall (now operating under the Haven Holidays brand).
- Trelawne Manor - Cornwall (was operated by Haven until the management buyout post Bourne sale, now operating under the John Fowler Holidays brand).
- Torquay - Devon
- Devon Valley - Devon (now closed)
- Lyme Bay - Devon (now closed)
- Chesil Beach - Dorset
- Seaview - Dorset
- Fort Warden - Isle of Wight (now closed)
- Nodes Point - Isle of Wight (was operated by Haven until the management buyout post Bourne sale, now operating under the Parkdean Resorts brand).
- Lower Hyde - Isle of Wight (was operated by Haven until the management buyout post Bourne sale, now operating under the Parkdean Resorts brand).
