= Holiday camp =

Site with accommodation and entertainment

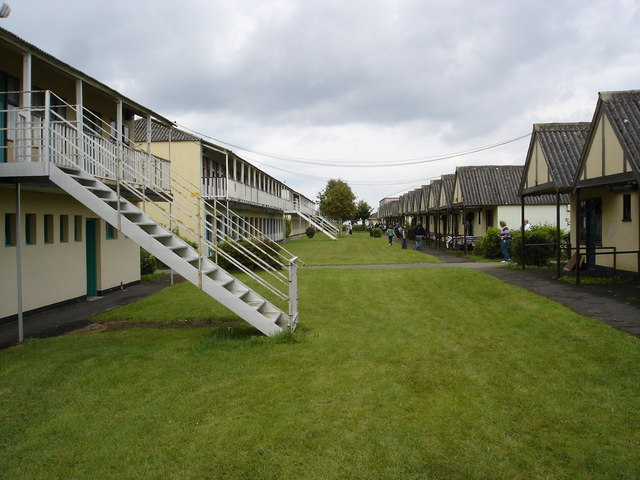
This photograph of Butlin's in Mosney shows the rows of chalet accommodation found at the company's holiday camps until the 1980s.

A holiday camp is a type of holiday accommodation, primarily in the United Kingdom, that encourages holidaymakers to stay within the site boundary, and provides entertainment and facilities for them throughout the day. Since the 1970s, the term has fallen out of favour with terms such as holiday park, resort, holiday village and holiday centre replacing it.

As distinct from camping, accommodation typically consisted of wooden chalets, accommodation buildings arranged individually or in blocks. From the 1960s onward, many camps also added static caravan accommodation, and today, many static caravans are also termed holiday camps.

== History ==
Cunningham's Young Men's Holiday Camp at Groudle (1894–1903) then Douglas (1904–1939) on the Isle of Man is sometimes regarded as the first holiday camp, but it differed from the definition (above), especially as accommodation was still in tents. Cunningham's was still open by the time Billy Butlin opened his first camp in 1936 (and still averaged 60,000 campers on a good year).

Opened in 1906 by John Fletcher Dodd, Caister Camp in Caister-on-Sea, Norfolk was one of the first permanent camps under canvas (tents), initially catering for men only, it would later open up to families and advertise itself as "The Oldest Established Camp". By the early 1920s, Caister Camp and others around the country were beginning to include hut-based accommodation.

Inspired by visits to Caister Camp, 'Pa' Potter opened the first holiday camp with all wooden huts and permanent main buildings in 1920 at a site in Hemsby, Norfolk called Potters Camp. Potters Camp moved to Hopton-on-Sea in 1924 and moved again to a seaside location within that village in 1933. Potters Resort, as it is known today, is now the last surviving of those early pioneering family sites that is still privately owned and run by fourth generation John Potter.

In the 1930s, camps took on a larger scale with the establishment of large chains. The first of these was Warners, founded by Harry Warner who opened his first site on Hayling Island in 1931, with another three opening before the outbreak of World War II. During the early 1930s, Warner asked funfair entrepreneur Billy Butlin to join the board of his company and, in 1935, Butlin observed the construction of Warner's holiday camp in Seaton, Devon. Butlin learned from the experience of Warner, and employed the workers who had constructed the Seaton camp to build his first camp under the Butlins name at Skegness, Lincolnshire in 1936. By the outbreak of World War II, Butlin had opened another camp at Clacton-on-Sea, and was in negotiations to build two more (at Ayr in Scotland and Pwllheli in Wales). At that time, there were around 200 holiday camps in the United Kingdom at different seaside locations.

During World War I, the Cunningham's holiday camp was used as an internment camp. With the arrival of World War II, the British government realised they could save money by requisitioning the many holiday camps around the country rather than building purpose-built camps for training, stationing troops, internment, and for housing refugees and workers. After the war, most holiday camps in Britain had been damaged by troop occupation; the situation was so bad that questions were raised in Parliament.

The war was not bad for all camp owners. Butlin did a deal with the war minister to sell his unfinished Filey camp and to complete the work at a lower price than the army could complete it. Butlin specified a contractual term to ensure that he could buy his camps back from the war ministry as soon as the war was over. Another person to do well out of the war was Fred Pontin. During the war, Pontin was the manager of a camp housing steel and sugar beet workers. Taking over the job, Pontin found that the previous manager had been assaulted by the workers over a disagreement about food. Pontin quickly set about improving the conditions of those workers. After the war, Pontin took a loan and purchased a former military camp at Brean, Somerset which he opened as his first holiday-camp. His company Pontin's was established in 1946.

From the end of the war, through the 1950s and into the mid-1960s, the holiday camp industry thrived. By 1964, Warner had 14 camps across the country, Butlin opened his 10th camp in 1966, and Pontin had expanded into providing trips to Mediterranean locations in 1963. Not all ideas took off. Butlin attempted to expand into the Caribbean in the late 1940s, and hoped to expand the market for his camps in the United States, but by 1950 the venture was wound up, and Butlin admitted defeat and focused his efforts back in Europe.

Through the 1970s and 1980s, the market declined as people began to holiday overseas, taking advantage of the new, cheap package holidays. Pontins was least affected, partly as they were already providing package holidays and partly because their smaller camps meant they had fewer beds to fill. Butlins attempted to diversify into this same market, purchasing smaller camps and caravan parks and marketing them under the Freshfields name.

In the 1980s, many camps were shut down, as holidaymakers increasingly turned to package holidays and individually tailored breaks. The holiday camp was seen as run-of-the-mill or dated. 1983 saw the Butlins camps closed in Filey and Clacton.

Through the 1990s, substantial investment was made in the remaining camps as operators attempted to concentrate their resources. They also attempted to concentrate on specific market sectors. Butlins substantially rebuilt two of its main camps with a focus on caravan accommodation and branded them under sister company Haven – Pwllheli becoming Hafan y Mor and Ayr becoming Craig Tara. The number of Pontins camps was reduced to 8 with several sold off or redeveloped for housing estates. Meanwhile, Warner's had experimented with "Adult Only" camps in the 1980s and gone on to develop hotels (usually in historic buildings) providing hotel-type comfort mixed with holiday-camp-style entertainment. The camps have attempted to improve their status by changing away from the holiday camp identity and identifying themselves as holiday centres, resorts, holiday villages, coastal villages, or holiday parks. In 2004, market research company Mintel estimated that 26% of UK adults had used a holiday centre over the preceding two years (an increase of 4% compared to 2001).

== Facilities ==
Included in the price would be entertainments provided on site. These would include all or some of the following:

- Ballroom dancing
- Swimming pool
- Funfair
- Table tennis
- Snooker / eight-ball pool
- Cinema
- Bingo

Most camps were by the seaside but some, like "California in England" near Wokingham, Berkshire were beside a lake and catered for a modest 300 guests. "California in England" also had the only glass-floored ballroom in the country.

There were usually extensive childcare facilities such as a crèche and various clubs to keep young children occupied, enabling parents to follow their own pursuits.

In addition, there were usually other facilities for which a fee was charged: bars, restaurants, amusement arcades.

=== Catering ===
Holidaymakers would pay a fee for their accommodation and decide whether to go full board (all meals would also be included in the price), half board (only the main meal would be included) or self-catering (no meals provided). At the larger camps, it was not impossible for up to 10,000 people to need to be catered for. These camps would have two sittings for each meal, usually an hour apart. This could mean that a camp would serve over 200,000 meals per week, all cooked on site. In a typical year in the early 1960s, Butlins would cook:

- 3.5 million eggs
- 100 tons (about 100 tonnes) of sausages
- 120,000 gallons (550,000 litres) of soup
- 1,570 tons (1,600 tonnes) of potatoes
- 34 tons (about 35 tonnes) of tea (enough for over 20 million cups)
- 240 tons (244 tonnes) of pork chops (requiring over 8,000 pigs)

== Frontline staff ==
It was Billy Butlin's idea that frontline staff should wear red blazers to identify themselves, and rival companies adopted different colours. Butlin's staff were called Redcoats, Pontins' staff were Bluecoats, and Warner's staff were Greencoats. Their duties ranged from adult entertainer or children's entertainer to stewarding.

With the growth of caravan parks in the 1970s and 1980s, the entertainment teams adopted more modern names, such as the HavenMates or the FunStars.

=== Famous ex-Redcoats ===
- Dave Allen – comedian
- Michael Barrymore – comedian, television presenter and entertainer
- Roy Hudd – actor, comedian and radio host
- Stephen Mulhern – presenter and game show host
- Jimmy Perry – co-writer of Dad's Army and Hi-de-Hi! (a situation comedy set in a holiday camp)
- Cliff Richard – pop singer, musician and performer
- Ted Rogers – comedian, entertainer and host of 3-2-1
- Jimmy Tarbuck – comedian and host of Winner Takes All
- Ian "H" Watkins - member of the pop group Steps

=== Famous ex-Bluecoats ===
- Brian Conley - actor, comedian and television presenter
- Lee Mack – stand-up comedian, actor and creator/star of the TV sitcom Not Going Out
- Dave Benson Phillips - entertainer and children’s TV presenter
- Shane Richie - actor, comedian and television presenter
- Bradley Walsh - actor, comedian and television presenter

=== Famous ex-Greencoats ===
- Roger deCoursey – British ventriloquist and stage performer
- Joe Pasquale – comedian, actor and television presenter

=== Famous ex-HavenMates ===
- Duncan James – member of boy band Blue
