= The Rank Group =

Gambling company

The Rank Group plc
- Logo used since 2022
- Formerly: Megastorm Public Limited Company (1995–1996)
- Type: Public
- Traded as: LSE: RNK; FTSE 250 component
- Industry: Gambling
- Predecessor: Rank Organisation
- Founded: 1995; 31 years ago
- Headquarters: Maidenhead, Berkshire, United Kingdom
- Number of locations: 152 (UK); 2 (Belgium); 10 (Spain)
- Area served: United Kingdom; Belgium; Spain
- Key people: Ian Burke (chairman); John O'Reilly (chief executive); Louis Chen (chief executive)
- Products: Grosvenor Casinos; Mecca Bingo; enracha; Rank España; Rank Interactive
- Revenue: ▲£835.0 million (2026)
- Operating income: ▲£78.6 million (2026)
- Net income: ▼£29.9 million (2026)
- Website: rank.com

The Rank Group plc is a gambling company based in the United Kingdom. Rank was involved in the cinema and motion picture industry until 2006, and continues to use the Gongman logo originally used by the Rank Organisation's film distribution subsidiary General Film Distributors. Its brands now include Mecca Bingo, and Grosvenor Casinos, the UK's largest casino operator.

Rank's principal market and headquarters are in the United Kingdom, where it operates Grosvenor Casinos (56 casinos), Mecca Bingo (96 bingo clubs) and Rank Interactive (online gambling and betting). It also operates additional Grosvenor Casinos clubs in Belgium (two casinos), and Rank España in Spain (10 bingo clubs).

Rank is listed on the London Stock Exchange and is a constituent of the FTSE 250 Index.

== History ==
The company was formed to acquire the business interests of the Rank Organisation, which itself was formed out of the business interests of its founder, J. Arthur Rank. Until the start of the 21st century, the group still had a tremendous amount of leisure holdings; however, as the decade progressed it divested these interests, beginning with Pinewood Studios and the Odeon cinema chain. It also shed its engineering interests, such as its share in Rank Xerox, selling Rank Leisure Machine Services to Gamestec. It sold its holiday and recreation facilities: Oasis Forest Holiday Villages was sold to Center Parcs UK, and all its Butlins, Warner and Haven Holidays facilities were all sold to Bourne Leisure.

The company then sold off its nightclub division, Rank Entertainment, as well as its interest in Universal Orlando Resort, and disposed of the Rank film library to Carlton Communications, to which it had recently also sold the Rank Screen Advertising Film Division, which was latterly known as Cinema Media (now Digital Cinema Media).

In December 2005, Rank sold Deluxe Film (formerly Rank Film Laboratories) for £430 million, effectively ending its 60-year association with the film and cinema business. This meant Rank Leisure had become focused on gambling operations, with its remaining business interests concentrating on Grosvenor and G Casinos, Top Rank and Mecca Bingo, and online gambling through Rank Interactive, after the company acquired the Blue Square betting business in 2003. Finally leaving all non-gambling leisure behind, in December 2006, Rank sold the Hard Rock business, excluding the London casino venue which was rebranded to G Casinos, to the Seminole Tribe of Florida for US$965 million.

In May 2012, Rank agreed to purchase 23 casinos from Gala Coral for £205 million. After the Competition Commission ruled that the deal would only go ahead if four venues were excluded, in March 2013 Rank agreed to purchase 19 casinos from Gala Coral for £179 million, making Rank the UK's largest casino operator. In April 2013, the group sold its Blue Square interactive gambling business, launched in 1999, to Betfair. In January 2017, Rank Group and Mecca Bingo announced the renewal of their contract, which guarantees the use of Playtech's Virtue Fusion platform at the bingo site for another 10 years.

== Operations ==
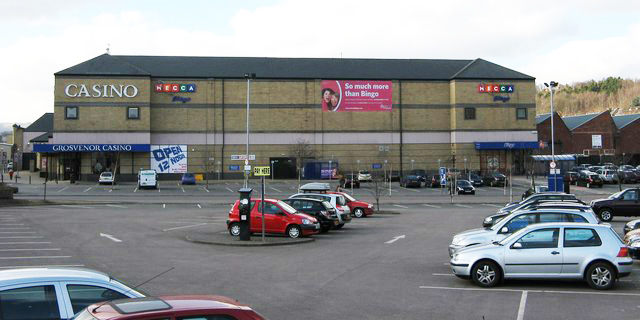
Grosvenor Casino and Mecca Bingo in Huddersfield

=== Grosvenor Casinos ===
Established in 1970, Grosvenor Casinos (formerly County Clubs) is a UK-based chain of over 50 casinos located in major towns and cities across the UK with two sister casinos located in Belgium. In 2010, the group had an active membership of 1 million customers across its 35 UK clubs under the Grosvenor brand. In March 2013, Rank announced that it had conditionally agreed to purchase 19 Gala Casinos from the Gala Coral Group in a £179 million deal. With the addition of these casinos and a further three non-operating licences, Rank has become the largest casino operator in the UK, with 56 casinos.

=== Mecca Bingo ===
Mecca Bingo (formerly called Top Rank) is a UK-based social and bingo club leisure company, with sites located in several major towns and cities across the UK. The company operates meccabingo.com and meccagames.com as extensions of the Mecca Bingo brand. Mecca Bingo now offers players the ability to interact with a live dealer in the desktop and mobile app (iOS and Android) platforms instead of relying on a random number generator.

==== Controversy ====
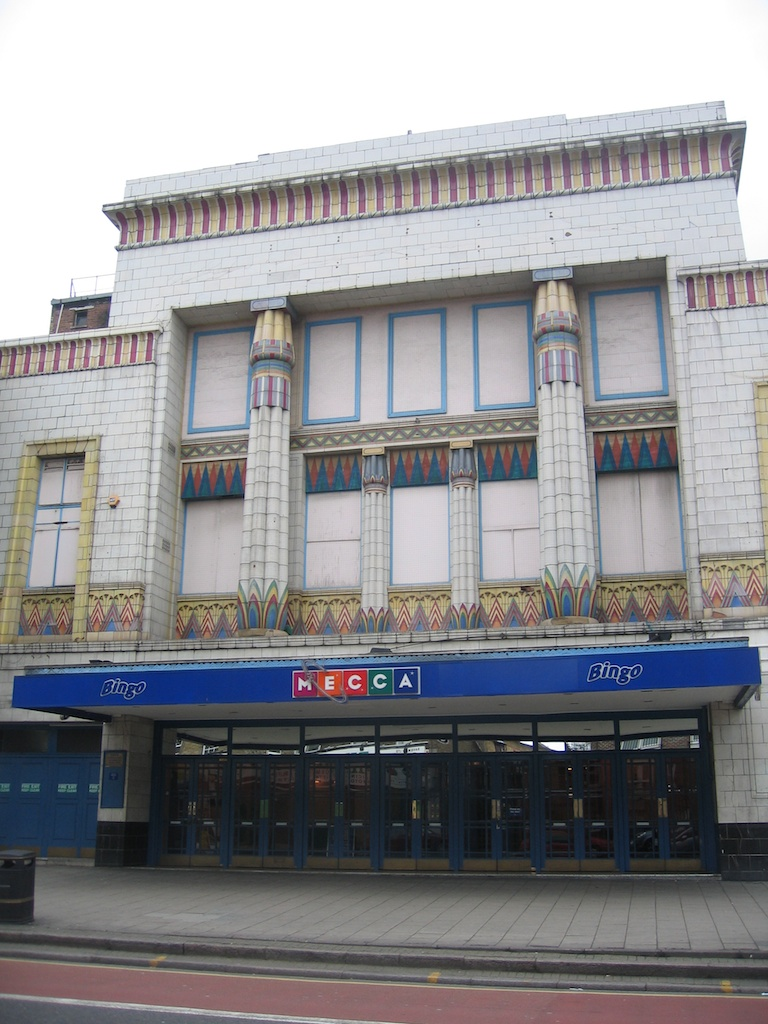
Mecca Bingo in Essex Road, London

On 25 December 1997, many Muslims were angered that the name of their holiest city, Mecca, was also the name of a gambling company, as gambling is strictly forbidden in Islam. Bricks were thrown through windows at a Mecca Bingo hall in Luton, causing £3000 of damage. In a meeting held between community leaders and Mecca Bingo executives on 6 January 1998, Hazel Simmons, chairwoman of equal opportunities at Luton Borough Council, said, "We are aware of a groundswell of public opinion and I personally believe this to be insensitive in what is now a truly multicultural society." However, Mecca Bingo said that the name change from Top Rank was not insensitive and was part of a policy of bringing their nationwide chain of bingo halls under one name. Sergeant Peter Shepherd said, "It was unrealistic to expect that anything definite could be resolved at the meeting, but at least it was constructive to have the dialogue."

=== enracha ===
enracha is Rank's interactive Spanish gambling site launched in 2011. enracha offers a wide range of online slots, videobingo, blackjack, roulette, live roulette, skill games and other casino games.

== Technology ==
In January 2015, Rank announced that it would move to a new technology platform supplied by Bede Gaming. The public announcement said the rationale for the new platform is to give greater control, flexibility and speed in integrating third-party and retail content and functionality. The platform will integrate Rank's digital and land-based businesses to allow for a single view for the customer.
