= List of Undercover Boss (British TV series) episodes =

Undercover Boss is a British reality television series. Each episode depicts a person who has a high management position at a major business, deciding to become undercover as an entry-level employee to discover the faults in the company. The following is a list of episodes of the British version of the show.

== Summary ==
Series	Episodes	Originally released	
Series	Episodes	First released	Last released
1	2	18 June 2009	25 June 2009
2	7	15 July 2010	26 September 2010
3	6	5 July 2011	9 August 2011
4	6	2 July 2012	6 August 2012
5	6	8 July 2013	5 August 2013
6	6	15 July 2014	20 August 2014

== Series 1: 2009 ==
No. in series	Title	"Boss"	Original release date	Ref(s)
1	"Park Resorts"	Andy Edge	18 June 2009	
Andy Edge, company director of Park Resorts, goes undercover in a variety of entry level jobs. Throughout his two weeks undercover, he experiences what it is like to be a cleaner, laundry hand, kitchen hand, waiter and entertainer.
2	"Clugston Group"	Stephen Martin	25 June 2009	
Stephen Martin, chief executive officer the Clugston Group, trades in his suit for a hard hat when he pours concrete, works in blast-furnaces, tests his carpentry skills and works night-shifts repairing roads.

== Series 2: 2010 ==
No. in series	Title	"Boss"	Original release date	Ref(s)
1	"Best Western"	David Clarke	15 July 2010	
David Clarke, chief executive officer of Best Western, spends five days undercover as a new recruit in the company.
2	"Tower Hamlets"	Kevan Collins	22 July 2010	
Kevan Collins, the boss of London's Tower Hamlets council, goes undercover in the housing and homeless office and alongside community law enforcement officers.
3	"Harry Ramsden's"	Marija Simovic	29 July 2010	
Marija Simovic, chief operating officer of Harry Ramsden's, goes undercover to find out why their 80-year-old brand is struggling.
4	"Jockey Club"	Paul Fisher	5 August 2010	
Paul Fisher, the boss of Jockey Club Racecourses, poses as a new entry-level casual employee to find out how his company really works.
5	"Viridor"	Colin Drummond	12 August 2010	
Colin Drummond, chief executive officer of Viridor, spends five days as a new recruit working at the sharp end of his business.
6	"Crown Worldwide Group"	Narin Ganesh	19 August 2010	
Narin Ganesh, finance director of Crown Worldwide, pretends to be a redundant office worker to find out the operations of the company at the ground level.
7	"Park Resorts Revisit"	Andy Edge	26 September 2010	
More than a year after being the first boss to go undercover in his own company for the programme Undercover Boss returns to see what lasting effect their presence has had on the company.

== Series 3: 2011 ==
No. in series	Title	"Boss"	Original release date	Ref(s)
1	"Ann Summers"	Vanessa Gold	5 July 2011	
Ann Summers CEO Jacqueline Gold sends her sister Vanessa undercover at the adult retailer Ann Summers.
2	"Southern Fried Chicken"	Andrew Withers	12 July 2011	
Andrew Withers, boss of Southern Fried Chicken, goes undercover in his fast food franchise, and is shocked by what he discovers about the standards, staff, food and customers.
3	"The Blue Cross"	Kim Hamilton	19 July 2011	
The Blue Cross, one of the UK's leading animal welfare charities, undergoes the Undercover Boss treatment as Kim Hamilton takes a turn cleaning dog kennels and helping cats give birth.
4	"Isuzu Trucks UK"	Nikki King	26 July 2011	
Managing Director Nikki King goes undercover at truck dealers Isuzu Trucks UK.
5	"npower UK"	Kevin McCullough and Charlie Brenland	2 August 2011	
Chief Operating Officer Kevin McCullough goes undercover at npower, one of the UK's top utility companies.
6	"Poundworld"	Martyn Birks	9 August 2011	
Martyn Birks, the director of Poundworld, goes undercover to discover why some of the budget chain's stores are failing to perform as well as expected, and why employee turnover is high.

== Series 4: 2012 ==
No. in series	Title	"Boss"	Original release date	Ref(s)
1	"Pizza GoGo"	Fouad Haghighat	2 July 2012	
Fouad Haghighat goes undercover in his dad's pizza delivery company to discover some shocking health and safety breaches, but also some inspirational workers.
2	"Oceana Nightclubs"	Peter Marks	9 July 2012	
The CEO of Britain's biggest nightclub chain, which includes well-known brands Oceana, Liquid, and Lava and Ignite, goes undercover in his own business.
3	"Paddy Power"	William Reeve	16 July 2012	
Company director William Reeve goes undercover on the shop floor of multi million pound gaming business Paddy Power.
4	"Francesco Group Hairdressers"	Jacqui McIntosh	23 July 2012	
Former celebrity hairdresser Jacqui McIntosh, now a senior manager of The Francesco Group, is on a mission to find out why the company's profits are down.
5	"HC-One"	Pam Finnis	30 July 2012	
Pam Finnis, managing director of one of Britain's biggest care home firms, goes undercover to investigate standards of care.
6	"Stena Line"	Gunnar Blomdahl	6 August 2012	
Gunnar Blomdahl, CEO of one of the UK's biggest ferry companies, Stena Line, goes undercover on some of his own fleet of ships to find out if the business is delivering its promise of convenient, efficient and relaxing travel.

== Series 5: 2013 ==
No. in series	Title	"Boss"	Original release date	Ref(s)
1	"DHL"	Phil Couchman	1 July 2013	
Chief Executive Phil Couchman heads back to the frontline to work alongside his staff. Terrified of losing even a single customer to the competition, Phil aims to find out if workers are delivering the top notch service he expects.
2	"Securitas"	Geoff Zeidler	8 July 2013	
After years in the boardroom, Geoff Zeidler of Securitas goes undercover, to be blown away by the sacrifices his security officers make and the violence and racial abuse they encounter through just doing their job.
3	"Hyundai"	Ray Pope	15 July 2013	
Company director Ray Pope steps out from his cosy office and into very unfamiliar territory by going undercover on the shopfloor of multi-million pound car giant Hyundai.
4	"Southwark"	Eleanor Kelly	22 July 2013	
Eleanor Kelly, Chief Executive of south London's Southwark Council, wants to see how slashed budgets are affecting the borough's services, residents and an often under-appreciated staff.
5	"Biffa"	Ian Wakelin	29 July 2013	
Chief Executive Ian Wakelin goes undercover in Biffa, the waste and recycling company.
6	"Quicksilver"	Peter Harvey	6 August 2013	
Peter Harvey, boss of slot machine company Quicksilver, adopts a dramatic disguise and goes undercover in the hope of working undetected alongside his frontline staff.

== Series 6: 2014 ==
No. in series	Title	"Boss"	Original release date	Ref(s)
1	"Moss Bros"	Brian Brick	15 July 2014	
Brian Brick, Chief Executive of Moss Bros, goes undercover to see how his cost-cutting methods have impacted on customer experience and the company's staff.
2	"Oxfam"	Mark Goldring	22 July 2014	
Mark Goldring, CEO of Oxfam - one of Britain's largest charities, goes undercover to see whether the charity is maxmising fundraising opportunities and spending funds efficiently.
3	"Pets Corner"	Steve Charman	29 July 2014	
The co-owner of nationwide retailer Pets Corner goes undercover in his own business to see if a potentially risky multi-million pound investment to grow the business is likely to succeed.
4	"Rowlands Pharmacy"	Kenny Black	5 August 2014	
With government funding down and competition increasing, pharmacy chain Rowlands has seen its turnover drop by £20 million, so managing director Kenny Black goes undercover to investigate.
5	"YMCA"	Bims Alalade	12 August 2014	
Senior director Bims Alalade goes undercover in the world's largest and oldest youth charity to see how massive budget cuts have affected facilities, staff and residents.
6	"Carluccio's"	Simon Kossoff	20 August 2014	
Chief Executive Simon Kossoff goes undercover as his restaurant chain Carluccio's plans to double in size in five years. He's keen to expose problems that could jeopardise successful growth.

== Ratings ==
No.	Episode	Airdate	Viewers		Share		Rank Week	Notes
No.	Episode	Airdate	Main	Digital	Main	Digital	Rank Week	Notes
Series 1
1	Park Resorts / Andy Edge	18 June 2009	2,910,000	—N/a	—N/a	—N/a	61	
2	Clugston Group / Stephen Martin	25 June 2009	2,010,000	—N/a	—N/a	—N/a	78	
Series 2
1	Best Western / David Clarke	15 July 2010	2,230,000	340,000	9.9%	1.8%	—N/a	
2	Tower Hamlets / Kevan Collins	22 July 2010	2,400,000	443,000	10.8%	2.4%	—N/a	
3	Harry Ramsden's / Marija Simovic	29 July 2010	1,660,000	241,000	7.4%	1.3%	—N/a	
4	Jockey Club / Paul Fisher	5 August 2010	2,090,000	345,000	9.3%	1.9%	—N/a	
5	Viridor / Colin Drummond	12 August 2010	2,240,000	285,000	9.5%	1.4%	—N/a	
6	Crown Worldwide Group / Narin Ganesh	19 August 2010	—N/a	—N/a	—N/a	—N/a	—N/a	—N/a
7	Park Resorts Revisit / Andy Edge	26 September 2010	—N/a	—N/a	—N/a	—N/a	—N/a	—N/a
Series 3
1	Ann Summers / Jacqueline Gold	5 July 2011	—N/a	—N/a	—N/a	—N/a	—N/a	—N/a
2	Southern Fried Chicken / Andrew Withers	12 July 2011	—N/a	—N/a	—N/a	—N/a	—N/a	—N/a
3	The Blue Cross / Kim Hamilton	19 July 2011	—N/a	—N/a	—N/a	—N/a	—N/a	—N/a
4	Isuzu Trucks UK / Nikki King	26 July 2011	—N/a	—N/a	—N/a	—N/a	—N/a	—N/a
5	npower UK / Kevin McCullough	2 August 2011	—N/a	—N/a	—N/a	—N/a	—N/a	—N/a
6	Poundworld / Martyn Birks	9 August 2011	—N/a	—N/a	—N/a	—N/a	—N/a	—N/a
