= Rid (name) =

Rid is both a given name and a surname. Notable people with the name include:

- Annette Rid, bioethicist and physician-scientist
- Rid Grachev (1935–2004), Soviet and Russian poet, writer, translator and essayist
- Samuel Rid, English writer
- Thomas Rid (born 1975), German political scientist
