= Backshall =

Backshall is a surname. Notable people with the surname include:

- Steve Backshall (born 1973), English naturalist, explorer, presenter and writer
- Tim Backshall (television presenter), English television presenter

== See also ==
- Boxall, surname
