= List of Romanichal-related depictions and documentaries =

This page cites Romanichal-related books, films, documentaries, and other forms of media documentation and/or depiction.

== List of Romanichal-related depictions & documentaries ==
=== Television ===
- My Big Fat American Gypsy Wedding - a controversial reality television show which allegedly portrays the lives of Romanichal Gypsies and Irish Travellers in the United States, but the show has been widely denounced and criticized for racism, and non-Gypsy actors spreading misinformation about the Romanichals.
- Gypsy Girl (2001) CITV — Children's television series, based on the books by Elizabeth Arnold, and centers around the title character Freya Boswell and her family.
- Ashes to Ashes Series 2 2009 Episode 2 — A British television police drama series set in the 1980s. A police officer tries to clear her name when she is involved in the accidental death of an English Romanichal. She uncovers a pre-meditated plot to murder him with a depressant overdose. The episode does include some stereotypical elements as the plot unfolds; namely the plot device of an old Romani clairvoyant and friction between the police and the Romani camp. However these stereotypes are turned on their head as there are elements of police corruption and the local doctor who was obsessed with the victims wife is found guilty of poisoning.
- Star Trek: The Next Generation, Season 2, Episode 3, Elementary, Dear Data (December 5, 1988) — In the opening scene in the holodeck playing the part of Sherlock Holmes Data exposes an ambassador for the king of Bohemia. Claiming he was robbed in London by gypsies who in turn also took a sensitive photograph of the king and his mistress. Data rips open the mans coat lining displaying the photograph concluding he is an agent working against the king with the intent to use the photograph for blackmail purposes.
- The Canterville Ghost (1974) Television dramatisation - Based on the (1887) short story by Oscar Wilde. A Romani group are suspected of kidnapping a girl but are innocent and join in the search for her.
- Kizzy (1976) BBC Television dramatisation - Based on the (1972) children's novel The Diddakoi by Rumer Godden.
- Peaky Blinders - The BBC Two series features the Romani Lee family who become allies to the Shelbys after an arranged marriage between John Shelby and Esme Lee.
- Glue (2014)

=== Documentaries ===
- Romany Trail, The World About Us (1981) TV documentary – Discusses the Indian origin of the British Romani people and other groups throughout Europe. The programme shows various aspects of Romanichal culture, including Appleby fair in Cumbria.
- Romany Summer by Barry Cockcroft (1971) TV documentary – A documentary of Romani life in Britain in the 1970s, featuring a family of Romany Gypsies who travelled and lived around York.
- 'Latcho Drom ("safe journey") is a 1993 French documentary film directed and written by Tony Gatlif. The movie is about the Romani people's journey from north-west India to Spain, consisting primarily of music. The film was screened in the Un Certain Regard section at the 1993 Cannes Film Festival
- La canzone di Rebecca (The Song of Rebecca, 2012) - A documentary by Roberto Malini on the story of the young Roma artist Rebecca Covaciu. The documentary received the Dan Avalos Award 2013.

=== Radio ===
- Atching Tan (The Stopping Place) (2008 – 2010) Radio drama – A drama series of 36 episodes that follows the relationships that evolve between members of the Gypsy community and the settled community in a rural village. Atching Tan has received extremely positive reviews for its insightful drama produced by The Romany Theatre Company (RTC).

=== Film ===
- Caravan – Based on the book by Eleanor Smith (herself of Romani descent). Richard Durrell loses his memory as a result of the assault and marries a Romani girl.
- The Vagabond (1916) - by Charlie Chaplin a slapstick comedy where he falls in love with a young woman who is with gypsies.
- Sky West and Crooked (1966) - Inspired by the novel The Gypsy and the Gentleman by D. H. Lawrence. A young girl played by Hayley Mills finds happiness and friendship with a young English Romani played by Ian McShane in an English village.
- The Raggedy Rawnie - Starring Bob Hoskins (himself of Romani descent) playing a soldier who goes AWOL during World War I who is taken in by a community of English Romanies.
- Haunted (1995) – Starring Aidan Quinn and Kate Beckinsale, an old Romanichal fortune teller reads the palms of two characters.
- Thinner (1996) - based on the 1984 novel by Stephen King. An elderly Romani places a weight loss curse on the New England lawyer who recklessly killed his daughter.
- The Gypsy and the Gentleman (1958) – A movie based on Belle, a young English Romani, who seeks to infiltrate the gentry of high society.
- Stone of Destiny (2008) – Based on a true story, Scottish nationalists reclaim the ancient symbol of their nation the Stone of Scone and bury the treasure is in a field. They return to find a Romanichal camp and one of the nationalists barters with the leader for the stone. In reality they waited until the Romani family left before recovering the stone.
- Stardust (2007) – A fantasy film, where Madame Semele/Ditchwater Sal: A witch, and a member of the Sisterhood travels around in a yellow Romani wagon.

=== Literature ===
Many of the descriptions in the 19th century are also the product of a romanticized view of Romanichal and other Romani groups, both idealized and reviled by Victorian and early-twentieth-century writers which manifests itself in the works of fiction by many other authors throughout the Victorian Era to the present.

=== Poem and verse ===
The earliest literal references of Romanies in England occurs in the 16th century, as Romanies emigrated to Tudor England. However, by the Elizabethan era this was a popular topic of the time, and suggests in his writings that William Shakespeare was influenced by tales or interaction's with the Romanies. As was common at the time Shakespeare referred to Romanies and believe they were Egyptians.

- Romeo and Juliet by William Shakespeare (1591–1595) – The play refers to Dido, a Cleopatra a gypsy.
- A Midsummer Night's Dream by William Shakespeare (1596) – Which includes the lines "Sees Helens beauty in the brow of Egypt", Egypt is used to refer to the Romnai people of England. In the context that imagining the face of a lover can make the dark skinned gypsy look like Helen of Troy a great beauty.
- As You Like It, a Pastoral Comedy by William Shakespeare (1600) – Shakespeare uses the word "dukdame" is a corruption or mishearing of the old Romanichal word dukka me or (I foretell or I tell fortunes).
- Othello by William Shakespeare (1603) – Desdemona's handkerchief a gift to Othello's mother is a gift from a gypsy "Egyptian charmer" who can almost read the thoughts of people.
- The Tempest by William Shakespeare (1611) – The only human inhabitant of the mythical island the character Caliban is thought to be named after the word Kaliban meaning black or with blackness in the English Romani language. As the first Romani immigrants arrived in England a century before Shakespear wrote The Tempest, it is thought he may have been influenced by their exotic looks. In this time Romanies in England were targeted for discrimination.
- Bartholomew Fair by Ben Jonson (1631) – A comedy in five acts, set in London's Bartholomew Fair. A band of German Romani arrive in England and perform to the assembled crowd as entertainers and rope-dancers.
- The Scholar Gypsy by Matthew Arnold – A poem based on a legend recounted by Joseph Glanvill in The Vanity of Dogmatizing (1661), based on the thoughts and reflections of a Romani's relationship, belief in, and relationship with, God.
- Vagrant Muse by William Wordsworth – A young homeless woman is welcomed by a band of Romanies who take her in and offer her charity and companionship.
- Not all Wagons and Lanes by Charlie Smith – A collection of English gypsy poems.
- The Invisible Kings by David Morley – A selection of Romani poems inspired by the authors own British Romani heritage.
- Vagabond in a Native Place by John Clare - A selection of poems romanticizing the lives, culture, and wanderings of the English Romani people.
- The Scholar Gipsy by Matthew Arnold – A 19th-century poem regarding the religious moral of the English Romani based in his belief in, and relationship with god. Arnold laments that non-gypsies have lost their faith.
- Not all Wagons and Lanes by Charles – Collection of poems by Charles Smith.
- Gavvered All Around by Dennis Binns – Anthology of thirty poems written by 10 Gypsy poets.

=== Novels and short stories ===
- Moll Flanders by Daniel Defoe (1722) - Moll's earliest memory is of wandering "among a group of people they call Gypsies or Egyptians" in England.
- Old Curiosity Shop by Charles Dickens (1841) – Describes the first literary mention of an English Romanichal vardo or wagon.
- Lavengro by George Borrow (1851) – Considered to be Borrow's autobiographical masterpiece and a part philosophical adventure. A young man is befriended by a group of English Romanies and reflects on his wanderings with them.
- Romany Rye by George Borrow (1857) – In which a young man continues his journey with English Romani and is a sequel to Borrow's previous work Lavengro.
- Romano Lavo-lil by George Borrow (1874) - A dictionary of the language of the English Romanichals.
- Guy Mannering by Sir Walter Scott (1815) describes a community of Romanies living in the Scottish borders as being Scottish Romani and exotic. This refers to a Romanichal community living in the border area between Scotland and England, especially in the Kirk of Yetholm.
- The Wind on the Heath: A Gypsy Anthology by John Sampson (1930) - A compilation of more than three hundred selections from novels, plays, etc., from British authors, to convey the ubiquity of the idea of the Romanichal in British literature.
- Phoebe and the Gypsy by Andrea Spalding (2009) - A children's book about a young Canadian Phoebe Hill's who visits to her grandmother in England who befriends a Romani woman.
- The Adventure of the Speckled Band by Arthur Conan Doyle (1892) – one of 56 Sherlock Holmes stories; in which a group of English Romanies are suspected and later acquitted from the investigation and are allowed to leave.
- The Mill on the Floss by George Eliot - The protagonist Maggie runs away to Romanies, but decides she has gone out of her depth. They do not harm her, but the episode darkly prefigures the steps that she will take in adulthood.
- Emma by Jane Austen - Romanies make a brief appearance in Emma as children who bait Harriet in a lonely lane. Mr Knightley is warned about them as a neighborhood nuisance. Austen's description of the Romani is romanticized.
- The Gipsies Advocate by James Crabb – A Reverend motivates his community to improve the living standards of Romanies. The book was inspired after the author J. Gibb saw the injustices of society on British Romanies when a gypsy was convicted to death and his accomplice a non-Romani was spared.
- Haresfoot Legacy by Frances Brown – Left destitute by her preacher father a young when he discovers she's pregnant, Liddy Nolan is taken in by a gypsy prize-fighter who offers to be a father to her unborn child. In time, Liddy shows herself a true Romany at heart and find happiness and love for each other.
- Riders by Jilly Cooper (1986) – The story protagonist Jake Lovell, the gypsy-born hero of the novel, is a brilliant horseman desperately seeking revenge for years of bullying at the hands of the glamorous, but brutish aristocrat is able to set himself up his own yard and begins building a reputation on the show jumping circuit.
- The Other Sister by Frances Brown – A young Romani girls life in a 19th-century circus troop that travels in England.
- Dancing on the Rainbow by Frances Brown – A young woman finds love and romance when she joins a 19th-century circus troop.
- The Hathaways Series by Lisa Kleypas – Features two half-Romanichal protagonist brothers.
- Jane Eyre by Charlotte Brontë - A supposed English Romani visits Thornfield Manor to tell fortunes, and the reactions of the guests there illustrate their characters as well as social attitudes.
- Wuthering Heights by Emily Brontë – Heathcliff perhaps might have been descended from Romani people and is often described as "dark" as or a "gypsy".
- The White Witch by Elizabeth Goudge (1958) - Has a very detailed storyline and description of the lifestyle of the Romanichals of the UK during the civil war.
- Gypsy Lover by Edith Layton - The third book in a trilogy of romantic fiction where Daffyd the illegitimate son of a noblewoman and a Romani, returns to England from a penal colony in Botany Bay to pardon and clear the name of his adopted father the Earl of Egremont who was wrongly accused of a crime.
- The Wind in the Willows by Kenneth Grahame – Toad, owner of Toad Hall, an impulsive and conceited character, buys a horse-drawn English Romani vardo. A few days later a passing motor car scares their horse causing the wagon to crash. This marks the end of Toad's craze, to be replaced by an obsession for motor cars.
- FightGame and Firefight by Kate Wild — teenage/young adult novels with a charismatic gypsy boy hero called Freedom Smith. They are thriller/sci fi based but they also deal with the real problems Gypsies face.
- Five Children and It by E. Nesbit – The children run into a band of English Romanies on the road.
- The Hundred and One Dalmatians by Dodie Smith - Cruella De Vil hires two English Romanies to steal the puppies.
- Danny, the Champion of the World by Roald Dahl (1975) - A children's book in which a young boy lives with his father in a traditional English vardo, although it is unclear if the protagonist Danny and his father are themselves Romanichal and admire the culture or prefer the lifestyle.
- The Diddakoi by Rumer Godden – Winner of the Whibread Children's Book Award, Diddikoi is the tale of an orphan Romani girl whose life is put in turmoil when her only living relative dies, her wagon burns, and she is left alone in a village community that hates her.
- Dark Blood by William Lee – Written by a Romani author Dark Blood tells the true story of Ethan Bray, a restless Romany orphan. Into his settled farming life in post-war Kent comes May, the beautiful daughter of the Traveller Tucker Beaney; but Ethan must face immense danger and personal conflict if he is to win her hand in marriage.
- Once by James Herbert – A Wiccan called Nell Quick is described to be alluring and dressed in the manner of a Romani woman. She is noted for her extremely beautiful looks and raven-colored hair. The novel never fully explains her origins or if she is connected to the Romanies.
- The Romany Heiress by Nikki Poppen - The heir to the Earl of Spelthorne is captivated by the arrival of a beautiful Romani who shows up on his doorstep claiming to be his deceased parents' long-lost daughter.
- The Virgin and the Gypsy by D H Lawrence (1926) – A young Romani hero is a useful antidote to a rigid social class system.
- Whistledown Woman by Josephine Cox – In a rage a man who thinks his wife has been unfaithful to him, he gives his new-born daughter to a gypsy family and has his wife locked away in an asylum. Starlena the daughter grows up ignorant of her parentage and vast inheritance, though her gypsy mother is ever watchful that someone might track her down and wish her harm.
- Aylwin by Theodore Watts-Dunton – A bestselling novel about a boy who befriends a clan of British gypsies and its positive portrayal of gypsy life.
- The Romany Girl by Valerie Wood – Orphan Polly Anna finds love and acceptance with a colorful travelling fair, becoming a horse rider and acrobat. Set against the backdrop of the Yorkshire Wolds, this saga spans three generations.
- Far From Home by Valerie Wood – A young woman and her maid travel to the gold rush in California to find her Romani lover.
- The Lady Julia Grey Mystery series- The hero, Nicolas Brisbane, is half-Roma. His mother was a Romany woman, who had the gift of sight, which she bestowed upon her son.

=== Biographies & Memoirs ===
- Gypsy Boy: One Boy's Struggle to Escape from a Secret World by Mikey Walsh (2010) - The story of a Gypsy boy growing up in a Romany Gypsy family during the 80s and 90s.
- Gypsy Boy on the Run by Mikey Walsh (2011) - The continuing story as Mikey decides to leave his Romany community and his life among the non-Gypsies.
- Gypsy Boy: My Life in the Secret World of the Romany Gypsies by Mikey Walsh (2012) - The continuing story of a Romany Gypsy and his life outside of his community.
- Gypsy Princess by Violet Cannon - The true story of a Romany childhood immersed in the Gypsy way of life, childhood set her apart from other children. Bullied by classmates, and segregated from non-Gypsies and the traditions in the age-old Gypsy culture on the fringes of society.
- A Field Full of Butterflies: Memories of a Romany Childhood by Rosemary Penfold (2010) - Rosemary Penfold was born in 1938 in a traditional Gypsy wagon, and grew up in the fields of the English countryside. In this beautiful and evocative memoir, she recounts her life within a loving extended family and small but close-knit community.
- The Girl in the Painted Caravan: Memories of a Romany Childhood by Eva Petulengero (2010) - A thoughtful tale that describes the warm and loving family life and many of the traditions and sometimes hard times of the Romany community.
- Rabbit Stew and a Penny or Two by Maggie Smith-Bendell – The life of a Romany woman from childhood to adulthood sometimes one of hardship and prejudice, but also, unforgettably, it recalls the glories of the Romany culture and life, in the absolute safety of a loyal and loving family.
- Seven Steps to Glory by John Pateman – The story of a Gypsy, Walter Pateman following the introduction of conscription in 1916 he fought in World War I and took part in an attack which proved to be one of the final actions of the Battle of the Somme. Who later was killed in action during night patrols and raids sent out into No Man's Land to gauge the strength of the enemy. The book accounts his birth in Kent to his death on the battlefields of France.
- Looking Back on my Gypsy Childhood by Louise Orchard – This book takes through the history and culture of the Romanies through the 1930s and Second World War.
- Our Forgotten Years: A Gypsy Woman's Life on the Road by Maggie-Smith-Bendell - A Gypsy woman's life on the road.

=== Non fiction ===
- Appleby Horse Fair by Barrie Law – The historical, social and cultural history of the Romany Applby horse fair.
- The Appleby Rai by G. Thorburn & J. Baxter – A book that discusses the history and culture of the Romanichal.
- Travelling Art: Gypsy Caravans and Canal Barges by Gordon Thorburn and John Baxter – The artistic design of the Romanichal vardo or wagon its history use and construction as masterpieces of woodcraft and design.
- Gypsies - Wanderers of the World by Bart McDowell (National Geographic) – A pictorial guide to the gypsies of Europe, the author stayed with a group of English gypsies and noted the cultural similarities and common roots between English and continental Romanies.
- Gypsies of the Heath by Betty Gillingham – An insight into the lives of the Romanichal in the early 20th century.
- A Mysterious People by Charles Duff – A guide to Romani culture including the Romani groups of Britain.
- West with the Tinkers by Cledwyn Hughes – A journey through Wales with British Romani gypsies.
- Gypsy Folk Tales by Francis Hinds Groom – A story based on the lovell Romani family who travel to Wales.
- Gypsy Travellers in 19th Century Society by David Mayall – A guide to the life and culture of the Romani gypsies of Britain in the 19th century.
- The Gypsies, Wagon Time and After by Denis Harvey – The Romanichal wagon its history use and construction.
- We are the Romani People by Ian Hancock – A look into the different types of Romani people
- The Wind on the Heath by John Sampson – A gypsy anthology first published in London 1930 containing items of prose and verse gleaned from classical literature, folklore, history and true Gypsy life.
- Romany Nevi Wesh by Len Smith – A history of early English Gypsy settlement in England
- Gypsy Horses by Lisa McNamara – The history of the Gypsy Cobb horse.
- Dreams of the Road- Gypsy Life in the West Country by Martin Levinson and Avril Silk – Contains an insight into gypsy life, childhood, community, education and work in the West Country of England.
- Our Village by Mary Russell Mitford – A history of the gypsy people in Berkshire England.
- A Romany Tapestry by Michael Hoadley – The author's personal memoirs and lifetime association and friendship with gypsies, their origins, practices, beliefs and customs.
- Jack by the Hedge by Nancy Price – The memoirs of English country life, including the gypsies.
- Gypsies, Didikois and Other Travellers by Norman Dodds – An account of the authors personal experiences of the gypsies of the British Isles.
- A Calendar of Fairs and Markets by Pat Loveridge – A collection of fairs and markets held in the nineteenth century and the Romani travelling people.
- The Gorse and the Briar by Patrick A. McEvoy – A tale of the gypsy life on the roads among horse-drawn Travellers in the last days of 'Wagon-Time'.
- Gypsies and Travellers in their own Words by Peter Saunders – A book that provides an insight into Gypsy and traveller lifestyle from the early 20th century to the present day. They tell how Gypsies and Travellers have lived and coped in extremely difficult circumstances. Whilst providing an insight into everyday life, the stories tell of both personal and cultural survival. They relate individuals' hopes and fears for the future, for themselves personally and for the Gypsy and Traveller way of life in general.
- Gypsy Wayside Burials by Robert Dawson – An insight into the burial customs of the British Romanies.
- British Gypsy Slavery by Robert Dawson – The history of British Romani slavery in the Caribbean and Americas.
- Crime and Prejudice, Traditional Travellers by Robert Dawson – The role of prejudice by non-Romani populations towards the Romani people.
- Northern Traveller Tales by Robert Dawson – Old Romani fireside stories from Derbyshire, Nottinghamshire, Yorkshire and the West of Scotland.
- The Hanging of Tobias Smith by Robert Dawson – The touching account of an 18th-century Romani called Tobias Smith, an illiterate prisoner found god and repented for his past wrongdoings before being hanged in 1792.
- Empty Lands by Robert Dawson – The history of the British Romanie, which includes a chapter on child removals by the authorities in the 20th century.
- Times Gone by Robert Dawson – British Romani history, including a section on the slavery of the 18-19th centuries.
- On the move in a Gypsy Wagon by Tom McReady – The story of a British Romani family who still live in a traditional vardo. The book contains over 200 color pictures.
- A Season in Time by Robert Dawson – The recollections of twelve gypsy authors at different times of the year.
- Spotting Old Vardos by Robert Dawson – History and information on the gypsy wagon.
- Henry Dry-Bread by Robert Dawson – A collection of gypsy letters.
- The Christening by Lisa Young and Val Mannering – The traditions and customs involved in a gypsy christening.
- Northern Traveller tales by Robert dawson – Traditional tales collected from Travellers in the East Midlands, North of England and Scotland.
- Times Gone by Robert Dawson – The British government's involvement in Romani slavery.
- On the Move in a Gypsy Wagon by Ryalla Duffy – The account of a Romani family that still travels in the old vardo.
- A Romani in the Family by Robert Dawson – How to trace your Romani heritage.
- Rokkering, Crecking and Cracking by Robert Dawson – The Romani language and cant dialects as found in Britain today.
- My Ancestors Were Gypsies by Sharon Floate – A comprehensive guide to researching your Gypsy family history in England and Wales.
- The Story of Notting Dale by Sharron Whetlor – The history of Notting Dale (North Kensington London) including the Romani population.
- Stopping Places by Simon Evans – A gypsy history and the traditional life of the Gypsies when they lived in "bender" tents and wooden horse-drawn wagons in South London and Kent.
- The Book of Boswell by Sylvester Gordon Boswell – The autobiography of the English gypsy activist Sylvester Boswell who led the deputation to save the historical Applby Horse Fair when it was threatened with closure by the local councils in 1965.
- Gypsy Camera by Tony Boxall (1992) – The author travelled with a Gypsy travelling in southern England in 1964, leading to a four-year photographic project that recorded the most significant transition in Gypsy culture in several hundred years. His photographs depict one Gypsy family's experience of the decline of the horse-drawn way of life and culture.
- A Gypsy Upbringing by Tony Price – A look into the gypsy upbringing in Britain.
- Raggle Taggle by Walter Starkie – A book written by a president of the Gypsy Lore Society detailing his wanderings with Romanies during a vacation from university. Written in the which are picaresque accounts in the tradition of George Borrows.
- Charles Dickens And Travellers by John Pateman – A book describing the influences and opinions Charles dickens had about the Romanies of Britain. His views were positive and he had a great respect for the Romani people as was evident in his books; Old Curiosity Shop, Nicholas Nickleby as well as characters in his novels and essays.
- Romanichal Gypsies, by Thomas Acton and David Gallant – Describes the wealth of Romanichal culture and tradition and explains why this way of life is under constant threat, as fewer and fewer allow caravans to stop.
- Looking Back on my Gypsy Childhood by Louise Orchard – This book takes through the history and culture of the Romanies through the 1930s and Second World War.
- The Travelling People Anthea Wormington – Informative and colourful book for children covering a range of Traveller subjects.
- A Horse for Joe Margaret by Hird & Ann Whitwell – The story of a boy Joe who dreams of owning a horse. Can he get his dream and buy one at Appleby Fair.
- Time to go Travelling by Charlotte Webster – Photographic account of a family preparing to leave their site to go travelling for the summer.
- Moving with the Times by Goodiy Reilly – A historical account of traveller life.
- A Victorian Childhood by Beryl Williams – Portrait of a Gypsy Traveller family and of a Funfair family.
- Focus: Background history of Travelling people in the Victorian period from a child's viewpoint.
- The Romano Drom Song Book by Denise Stanley & Roswy Burke – Traditional songs and ballads.
- Dirty Gyppo by Tom Odley – Collection of poems describing true side and hardships of the Gypsy way of life.
- Gypsy Caravans by E Alan Jones – looking at the history and restoration of traditional wagons.
- Gypsy Vans by Juliet Jeffery – Descriptions of different wagons.
- Travellers: An Introduction by Jon Cannon & the Travellers of Thistlebrook – Insight into the history, culture and lives of Travellers in Britain today.
- The Gypsies, Wagon-time and After by Denis Harvey – Dated book. An insight into the different aspects of Traveller life; including fashion, wagons and livelihood.
- The English Gypsy Caravan by C H Ward-Jackson & Denis Harvey – Origins, builders, technology and conservation of the Gypsy Caravan.
- Smoke in the Lanes by Dominic Reeve – classic account of the reality of life as a Gypsy in the 1950s.
- Whichever Way We Turn by Dominic Reeve – Personal insights by the author who lived with Romanichal gypsies, how the culture has adapted in the modern world.
- No Place Like Home by Dominic Reeve – A book reflecting on British gypsy politics and social change of the 60s.
- Beneath the Blue Sky by Dominic Reeve – A book depicting the modern changes Romanichal lifestyle in the modern age.
- Gypsy Dorelia by Dorothy U. Ratcliffe – The tale of a woman called Dorelia and her children.
- Yorkshire Gypsy Fairs by E. Allan Jones – A guide to the traditional Yorkshire gypsy fairs.
- Old Ways, New Days: a family history of Gypsy life in South London and Kent by Rosie Smith and Lindsey Marsh: ISBN 978-1-903427-45-3

=== Other media ===
- Cadbury Flake television advert (1985) – A chocolate advert in the UK in which a young Romani woman eats a flake, paints a watercolor in a sunflower field, and travels in a Romanichal wagon.
- Meggan by Marvel Universe – Meggan of the Marvel comics superhero team Excalibur was born to a band of Romanies in England. She was expelled when they saw that she was a shapeshifter.

== See also ==
- Fictional representations of Romani people
