= Undercover Boss (British TV series) =

- Also known as: Undercover Big Boss
- Genre: Reality television
- Created by: Stephen Lambert
- Country of origin: United Kingdom
- Original language: English
- No. of series: 7
- No. of episodes: 37 (list of episodes)

Production
- Running time: 60 minutes (inc. adverts)
- Production company: Studio Lambert

Original release
- Network: Channel 4
- Release: 18 June 2009 – 20 August 2014
- Network: ITV
- Release: 5 August – 26 August 2021

Related
- Undercover Boss

Undercover Boss is a British reality television series. Each episode follows a person in a high management position at a major business who poses as an entry-level employee to find faults in the company. The first series, consisting of two episodes, aired in 2009; the second series, with six episodes, aired one year later. This original series sparked the Undercover Boss franchise. Localised versions have been produced in the United States, France, Australia, Germany, Canada and various other countries. In June 2021, it was announced that it would be revived on ITV after a seven-year absence. Retitled Undercover Big Boss, it premiered on 5 August 2021, with four episodes.

== Production ==
Each episode features a high-positioned executive or the owner of a corporation going undercover as an entry-level employee in their own company. The executive changes their appearance and assumes an alias and fictional back-story. The fictitious explanation for the accompanying camera crew is that the executive is being filmed as part of a documentary about entry-level workers in a particular industry. They spend approximately one week undercover, working in various areas of the company's operations, with a different job and in most cases a different location each day. The boss is exposed to a series of predicaments with amusing results. They invariably spend time getting to know the people who work in the company, learning about their professional and personal challenges.

At the end of their week undercover, the boss returns to their true identity and requests the employees he worked with individually to corporate headquarters. The boss reveals their identity and rewards hardworking employees through campaign, promotion or financial rewards. Other employees are given training or better working conditions.

Stephen Lambert says he got the idea for the show after hearing suggestions that Willie Walsh, boss of British Airways, might have been able to avoid the problems of the difficult opening of Heathrow airport's Terminal 5 in 2008, if he had worked anonymously and experienced the basic functions of the workplace. The show's producers do admit that participants know in advance that cameras are on the way, but that they do not know the real premise of the show.

== Transmissions ==
Series	Episodes	Originally released	
Series	Episodes	First released	Last released
1	2	18 June 2009	25 June 2009
2	7	15 July 2010	26 September 2010
3	6	5 July 2011	9 August 2011
4	6	2 July 2012	6 August 2012
5	6	8 July 2013	5 August 2013
6	6	15 July 2014	20 August 2014

== Episodes ==
The first series of Undercover Boss was broadcast in 2009 and consisted of two episodes. A second series was commissioned and was aired in 2010 featuring seven episodes, six with new companies and a return visit to the business where it all started to see what impact the show had in the longer term. The third series featured the bosses of Best Western, Jockey Club, Harry Ramsden's, Npower and Poundworld. Subsequent series were produced annually for Channel 4 until 2014, with the international versions continuing to be broadcast by the station. In 2021, the British show returned to ITV under the amended name of Undercover Big Boss (as Channel 4 still had the rights to show Undercover Boss USA in 2021) with caravan/park home tycoon Alfie Best of Wyldecrest Parks, the first boss to take part in the new series.

== International broadcasts ==
Selected episodes of the UK version of Undercover Boss air in the United States on TLC and OWN, as part of Undercover Boss: Abroad.

== See also ==
- Back to the Floor
