= List of Romanichals =

This page makes mention of prominent individuals of Romanichal descent.

listed alphabetically by surname

- Adam Ant (born 1954) – English punk/New Wave musician; of Romanichal descent
- Jake Bowers (born 1971) – journalist and broadcaster
- James Carver (born 1969) – British MEP (Member of the European Parliament)
- Charlie Chaplin (1889–1977) – English comic actor, filmmaker, and composer
- Louise Doughty (born 1963) – English writer
- Freddy Eastwood (born 1983) – Welsh footballer
- Tracey Emin (born 1963) – British artist shortlisted for the Turner Prize, also known as one of the chief Young British Artists of the late 20th century
- John-Henry Phillips – author, archaeologist, filmmaker, and television presenter. Undertook the first ever archaeological excavations of historic Romany sites in the United Kingdom.
- George Bramwell Evens (1884–1943) – English journalist and writer
- James Squire Farnell (1825–1888) – grandson of James Squire and the first Australian-born Premier of New South Wales
- Johnny Frankham (born 1948) – English light heavyweight boxer who knocked Muhammad Ali to the floor in an exhibition fight
- Francis Hindes Groome (1851–1902) – English writer
- Ian Hancock (born 1942) – Romani scholar and activist, born in the UK, living in the US, Professor at the University of Texas
- Bob Hoskins (1942–2014) – actor; of one-quarter Romanichal descent
- Raby Howell (1869–1937) – nineteenth-century English footballer (Liverpool, Sheffield United, and Preston North End)
- Jentina (born 1984) – British hip hop/R&B singer, rapper, songwriter, and model
- Canada Bill Jones (c. 1837–1877), English-born confidence artist, riverboat gambler and card sharp in Canada and the United States
- Priscilla Kelly (born 1997) – professional wrestler
- Denny Laine (1944–2023) a.k.a. Brian Hines – Moody Blues singer and guitarist
- Albert Lee (born 1943) – English guitarist.
- Jackie Leven (1950–2011) – Scottish songwriter and folk musician
- Cher Lloyd (born 1993) – English singer and rapper, whose mother is Romanichal
- Joe Longthorne (born 1955) – English singer and impressionist
- David Morley (born 1964) – British poet, critic, anthologist, editor, and scientist
- Róisín Mullins (born 1982) – English & Irish TV presenter, TV talent show judge, professional Irish dancer, stage show owner, and choreographer
- Xavier Petulengro (1859–1957) – writer and broadcaster, who frequently broadcast on BBC radio in the 1930s and 1940s
- Robert Plant (born 1948) – English singer and songwriter (former vocalist of Led Zeppelin); his mother is of Romanichal origin
- Billy Joe Saunders (born 1989) – English boxer who won silver and became the first Romani boxer to represent Great Britain at the 2008 Olympic Games
- Lady Eleanor Furneaux Smith (1902–1945) – English writer of popular novels often romanticized historical and Romani settings; she believed her paternal great-grandmother to have been Romanichal
- Rodney Smith (1860–1947) – British evangelist who conducted evangelistic campaigns in the United States and the UK
- James Squire (1754–1822) – on the First Fleet to Australia; founder of the Australian brewing industry in 1798
- Connor Swindells – actor
- Randolph Turpin (1928–1966) – English boxer who won the world middleweight championship by defeating Sugar Ray Robinson; his mother was of Romanichal origin
- Dick Turpin (1920–1990) – English boxer who was the first black fighter to win a British boxing title; his mother was of Romanichal origin
- Jackie Turpin (1925–2010) – English boxer; his mother was of Romanichal origin
- Tracy Ullman (born 30 December 1959) British-American actress, comedian, singer, writer, producer, and director
- Cherry Valentine (1993–2022) – English drag queen and contestant on the second season of RuPaul's Drag Race UK
- Henry Wharton (born 1967) – English middleweight boxing champion.

== See also ==
- List of Romani people
