= South Lakeland Parks =

Cluster of parks in English Lake District

South Lakeland Parks was a cluster of nine holiday parks based in the English Lake District and Morecambe Bay area. These parks were White Cross Bay, Limefitt, Fallbarrow, Todber, Ocean Edge, Regent, Gatebeck, Marina, and Hawthorne.

South Lakeland Parks specialised in developing and operating holiday parks with caravans and timber lodge accommodation. The parks included holiday home hire and holiday home sales, while the Fallbarrow site had two holiday cottages on site.

In 2013 management of the sites was taken over by Park Resorts.

== History ==
The company was established in 1988 as South Lakeland Caravans. The parks promoted three different styles of holiday - lakeside (parks based in the Lake District), countryside (parks based in the Troutbeck Valley) and seaside (parks based in the Morecambe Bay areas).

In June 2006, LGV acquired South Lakeland Caravans Limited, which was rebranded as South Lakeland Parks. South Lakeland Parks predominantly operated the owner-occupier model, generating most of its revenue from the sale of caravans and lodges and was one of the country's leading providers of timber-lodge units, a market which demonstrated high growth in the 2000s.

LGV had a strong management team led by CEO, Graham Hodgson and LGV supplemented the team with the appointments of a Finance Director and Martin Leppard as Non-Executive Chairman. After LGV took over the group, South Lakeland Parks embarked on a £3 million investment programme to upgrade the quality of the parks. Improvements across the nine parks included new timber lodge developments, new internet café facilities, an indoor swimming pool and better facilities for disabled guests. In November 2007, LGV successfully sold South Lakeland to White Ocean Leisure for £125 million, generating a return of more than twice its money in 17 months.

White Ocean Leisure sold South Lakeland Parks to Electra Partners for £47 million in 2013. Electra Partners merged the business into its existing holiday park company, Park Resorts.

== Locations ==
South Lakeland Parks consisted of nine different locations across the Lake District and Morecambe Bay area. These parks included White Cross Bay and Fallbarrow in lakeside locations, both overlooking Lake Windermere; Limefitt, Gatebeck and Todber in countryside locations, and Regent, Ocean Edge, Marina and Hawthorne in seaside locations.

In 2011 Fallbarrow opened 'The Lakeside', its latest lodge development, consisting of 25 high specification luxury lodges, with many benefiting from beautiful views of Windermere.

== Conservation ==
South Lakeland Parks was a member of Nurture Lakeland, a Cumbrian conservation charity, raising money for local conservation work and improving its own environmental practices. South Lakeland Parks worked with Nurture Lakeland to raise £50,000 for the ‘Miles without Stiles’ project which aimed to provide 39 accessible walking routes.

All of its Lake District Parks were awarded the David Bellamy Gold Award for their commitment to the environment. In addition, the parks were located in protected woodland and countryside areas.
