= Colin Drummond =

British businessman

- Born: Colin Irwin John Hamilton Drummond; 22 February 1951 (age 75); Northern Ireland
- Education: University of Oxford; Harvard Business School
- Occupation: Businessman
- Years active: 1972-2013 (CEO); 2013-2014 (Chairman)
- Title: Former CEO of Viridor and joint CEO of Pennon Group plc
- Term: 1992–2013
- Successor: Ian McAulay
- Spouse: Georgina Drummond

Colin Irwin John Hamilton Drummond OBE DL (born 22 February 1951) is a British businessman, and the former CEO of Viridor, and joint CEO of Pennon Group.

== Early life ==
Drummond was born and brought up in Northern Ireland, where his father worked in the shipyard before becoming a priest. He won a scholarship to read classics at the University of Oxford and after working for a short time at the Bank of England, completed an MBA at the Harvard Business School.

== Career ==
From 1992 to 2013, Drummond was chief executive of Viridor, one of the UK's leading recycling, renewable energy and waste management companies, and an executive director of Pennon Group PLC. He was then chairman of Viridor until the end of 2014. Prior to joining Pennon, Drummond was chief executive of Coats Viyella Yarns Division, an executive director of Renold PLC, a consultant with the Boston Consulting Group and an official with the Bank of England.

Drummond was chairman of the Government's 'Living with Environmental Change' business advisory board from 2009 to 2015, of UKTI's Water and Environmental Sector Advisory Group from 2005 to 2012, and of the Environmental Sustainability Knowledge Transfer Network from 2007/08 and chair of the 'WET 10' City Livery Companies from 2008 to 2013. From 1997 to 2015 he was a trustee, and is now honorary vice president of the Calvert Trust Exmoor.

In 2010, he appeared in the Channel 4 television series, Undercover Boss Undercover Boss.

He was appointed an OBE in the Queen's Birthday Honours 2012 for services to technology and innovation, and a Deputy Lieutenant (DL) of Somerset in 2016.

In August 2013 Viridor announced the appointment of Ian McAulay as chief executive of Viridor and executive director of Pennon Group taking effect from September 2013, with Drummond retiring as chief executive and taking up the position of non-executive chairman of Viridor.

Drummond has also been the chair of three NHS foundation trusts in Somerset. He was chairman of Taunton and Somerset NHS Foundation Trust from 2014 and continued when this became Somerset NHS Foundation Trust on 1 April 2020 as a result of a merger with Somerset Partnership NHS Foundation Trust. He became chair of the expanded Somerset NHS Foundation Trust after a merger with Yeovil District Hospital NHS Foundation Trust on 1 April 2023 before retiring in late 2024.

== Personal life ==
He met his wife Georgina whilst a student at Oxford. They have two sons. He lists among his hobbies as growing vegetables in the manner of 'peasant farmer.'
