= Alfie Best =

British businessman (born 1970)

- Born: Alfred William Best; 1970 (age 55–56); Lutterworth, Leicestershire, England
- Occupation: Businessman
- Known for: Chairman & founder, Wyldecrest Parks
- Television: BBC: Britain's Spending Secrets S1E1 (2015); Channel 5: Eamonn & Ruth: How The Other Half Lives (2016); Panorama: The Mobile Home Swindle (2024)
- Spouse(s): Rachel (divorced); Emily Jane Bruce
- Children: 2
- Website: alfiebest.co

Alfred William Best (born 1970), is a British businessman who is the chairman and founder of Wyldecrest Parks, a mobile home park company.

Best's businesses in the UK include 95 residential mobile home parks, seven holiday mobile home parks and a golf course in Herefordshire, along with a 50% share in 15 sites in the US, totalling £700 million, as well as a motor home rental company called Vaaroom and East Thurrock United Football Club and its ground.

In August 2021, Best appeared in the first episode of ITV's Undercover Big Boss.

== Early life ==
Best was born in a caravan in Lutterworth, Leicestershire to a poor Romanichal Gypsy family.(registration required) He left school at the age of 12 and started his first business at 14 years old, buying and selling cars and vans.

== Career ==
In 1990, aged 20, his car business almost collapsed so he got a job at a phone shop earning £70 a week. Three weeks later he started his own mobile phone shop then 18 months later with the help of a bank loan, he had thirteen stores in London. He later sold the business and moved to property investing.

In 2001, he bought his first mobile home park in Romford, Essex, the Lakeview Residential Park. He has since begun businesses in the hospitality, leisure, events, trading and finance industries. In 2018 he purchased a golf course in Herefordshire.

In October 2011, Best accepted a police caution for an alleged physical assault on one of his residents at Scatterdells Park, Bovingdon. The resident was protesting about alterations to the park. She later pressed charges, with police offering Best either a caution or go to court.

In July 2015, he and his business Wyldecrest Parks were shortlisted for both Entrepreneur of the Year and Retail & Property categories at the 2015 London Loves Excellence awards. Wyldecrest Parks won Retail & Property Business of the Year. In November 2018 Best was voted the 48th most influential person in the 2018 Essex Power 100 list, and ranked at number 11 in Leicestershire's rich-list.

In 2019, Best featured in the Sunday Times UK rich list and in 2020 he was #382 in the Sunday Times 2020 UK rich list with a net worth of £341 million, an increase of more than £100 million from last year. He purchased East Thurrock United F.C. in June 2022, saying that "I believe that it [the football club] has the opportunity to be the lifeblood of the community". The club folded in September 2023.

== Personal life ==
Best and his first wife Rachel had two children together, Alfie Jr and Elizabeth, but later divorced.

In 2013, Best and his son Alfie Jr appeared on the Channel 4 television programme My Big Fat Gypsy Fortune. In 2018 he played a small cameo in the British crime film Once Upon a Time in London.

In July 2016, Best was left with a "deep cut" after an attack by his son-in-law with a machete. It was heard he had previously reported "ongoing domestic violence" against his daughter Elizabeth but decided not to make an official complaint, instead opting to settle the dispute with a bareknuckle match. His son-in-law received a 13-month prison sentence for the attack.

In 2018, Best set up a charity called Wyldecrest Parks Charity, funding staffing and running costs himself.

Between 2016 and 2018, Best donated a total of £10,000 to the Conservative Party through his Shelfside (Holdings) Limited firm.

Best is now married to Emily Jane Bruce. They live in a "mansion" in Surrey.

He owns a 27-metre Sunseeker yacht Wyldecrest, as well as a private jet and a helicopter.
