= Rokker Radio =

Radio programme

Rokker Radio is a former programme on BBC Three Counties Radio from April 2006 to late 2008 for Romanies and the travelling community.

== Background ==
The programme was broadcast on Sunday evenings from 19:00 to 21:00. In August 2006, the programme expanded to several BBC Local Radio Stations across the east of England including BBC Radio Essex, BBC Radio Cambridgeshire and BBC Radio Norfolk. One of the secondary purposes of Rokker Radio is to educate the 'settled' community in the ways and lifestyles of People of No Fixed Abode, showmen, travellers (or those who would be).

The show was first produced by Karen Shrosbery, then Paul Scoins, David Landau and Victoria Cook and was presented by Romani journalist Jake Bowers.

== See also ==
- English Travellers
