= Parkdean Resorts =

Holiday park operator in the United Kingdom

- Type: Private Limited Company
- Industry: Leisure / Holiday
- Predecessor: Parkdean Holidays; Park Resorts
- Founded: November 2015
- Headquarters: Newcastle upon Tyne
- Number of locations: 65 holiday parks in the UK
- Key people: Steve Richards (CEO)
- Products: Self catering holiday parks
- Owner: Onex Corporation
- Number of employees: Over 9,000 in peak season
- Website: parkdeanresorts.co.uk

Parkdean Resorts is a holiday park operator in the United Kingdom. It was formed in November 2015 through the merger of Parkdean Holidays and Park Resorts. As of 2026 it operates 65 holiday parks across England, Scotland, and Wales, and is the largest holiday park operator in the UK. Parkdean invested £140 million into its parks in the UK in 2021 and 2022.

== History ==
=== Parkdean Holidays ===
Parkdean Holidays was formed in November 1999 via a management buyout of Trecco Bay Holiday Park in Porthcawl, South Wales. In March 2006, Alchemy Partners purchased an 80% stake in the company, with the remaining 20% split between Parkdean Holidays' management. In July 2007 Parkdean Holidays bought Weststar Holidays, which owned four holiday parks in South West England. The company offered a range of accommodation, including caravan holiday homes, lodges, cottages, and apartments; it also had caravan and camping pitches at many locations.

=== 2015-current ===
In 2015, Parkdean Holidays merged with Park Resorts to create Parkdean Resorts. The new company continued to operate under its two brands, "Parkdean Holidays" and "Park Resorts", with dual head offices in Newcastle and Hemel Hempstead, throughout 2016 before launching a new website and rebranding all the parks as Parkdean Resorts.

In December 2016, Canadian private equity company Onex Corporation purchased Parkdean Resorts from Epiris (formerly Electra Partners) and Alchemy Partners for £1.35 billion. The sale was completed in March 2017, and Onex Partners and certain co-investors made an equity investment of $627 million in the newly acquired company.

In early 2017, Parkdean introduced the result of the merger's new mascots, known as The Starland Krew. The lineup consists of Sparky the rabbit, Sid the seagull, Lizzie the lizard, Sparkle the rabbit, Naarky the aardvark and Pipsqueak the mouse. Sparky, Sparkle, Naarky and Pipsqueak weren't redesigned as they were already redesigned in 2014, however Sid and Lizzie were redesigned for the new group formation.

In June 2019, John Waterworth, who had been the CEO of Parkdean Holidays and then Parkdean Resorts for nearly 20 years, retired. Steve Richards, then CEO of Casual Dining Group, became CEO of Parkdean Resorts.

As of early 2020, Parkdean Resorts had 20,000 owners of on-site private caravans and lodges, and in its previous peak season of August 2019 had 120,000 people staying at its parks attended by 8,000 employees.

During the COVID-19 pandemic in the United Kingdom, Parkdean was criticized for not shutting down its travel parks during a time when the government was advising citizens to avoid non-essential travel. On 20 March 2020, Parkdean shut down all restaurants, pools, and other facilities in response to a nationwide Government order.

At the time, Parkdean stated to the press that the caravans are standalone and separate from each other with 70% privately owned, saying there is "no instruction or logic to evicting people who are enjoying the fresh air in their own space." People in multiple locations concerned that the parks staying open would place pressure on sparsely populated areas that are already struggling to obtain food supplies and that it would further spread the virus from metropolitan areas to remote rural areas that were poorly equipped to deal with it. On 23 March 2020, when the UK government announced a nationwide lockdown, the company closed its parks to the public, and announced plans to re-open to the public on 6 July.

In 2021 and 2022, Parkdean announced a number of park investments, for a total of £140 million. The investment plan included "850 new caravans and lodges," and developments at 16 parks. At the time, Parkdean said advance bookings were at "record levels" and that it was recruiting over 7,000 seasonal workers.

In the spring of 2021, Parkdean announced it would hire 6,500 seasonal staff for the summer. In early 2022, 13 different parks underwent some form of development, with Parkdean continuing to partner with brands such as Bear Grylls’ Survival Academy, Milkshake! and Nickelodeon. With its head office in Gosforth, Newcastle, Parkdean has 66 parks and a reported 3 million visitors per year. The company's holiday resorts include caravans, lodges, cabins, glamping and camping over 3,500 acres of land and 31,000 camping pitches.

In May 2025, it was announced that the company was seeking to fundraise £250 million to grow its footprint in the UK.

== Holiday parks and resorts ==
There are, as of 2026, 65 Parkdean Resorts located across the United Kingdom.

=== Current holiday parks and resorts ===
- Cornwall: Crantock Beach, Holywell Bay, Looe Bay, Newquay, St Minver, White Acres, Lizard Point, Sea Acres
- Devon: Bideford Bay, Challaborough Bay, Torquay
- Dorset: Sandford, Warmwell, West Bay
- East Sussex: Camber Sands
- East Riding of Yorkshire: Barmston Beach, Skipsea Sands, Withernsea Sands
- Essex: Coopers Beach, Highfield Grange, Naze Marine, Weeley Bridge, Valley Farm
- Isle of Wight: Landguard, Lower Hyde, Nodes Point, Thorness Bay
- Kent: Romney Sands, St Margarets Bay
- Lancashire: Regent Bay, Ocean Edge, Todber Valley
- Lincolnshire: Sunnydale, Southview
- Norfolk: Breydon Water, California Cliffs, Cherry Tree, Heacham Beach, Manor Park, Summerfields, Vauxhall
- Northumberland and County Durham: Crimdon Dene, Whitley Bay, Sandy Bay, Creswell Towers, Church Point
- North Yorkshire: Cayton Bay
- Suffolk: Kessingland Beach
- Scotland: Eyemouth, Grannies Heilan Hame, Nairn Lochloy, Sandylands, Southerness, Sundrum Castle, Tummel Valley, Wemyss Bay
- Wales: Brynowen, Carmarthen Bay, Pendine Sands, Trecco Bay, Ty Mawr

=== Former holiday parks ===
- Devon: Ruda (sold to John Fowler)

== Logos ==
Logo used 2015-2020

Logo used 2020-Current
