= Southern Fried Chicken =

British-based fast food outlet

Southern Fried Chicken Ltd.
- Type: Fast Food Franchise
- Industry: Restaurant
- Founded: 1970; 56 years ago
- Founder: Arthur Withers
- Headquarters: Reading, England, UK
- Area served: United Kingdom; Republic of the Congo; DR Congo; Cyprus; Kazakhstan; Greece; Malta; Martinique; Mongolia; Nigeria; Senegal; Tajikistan; Sharjah; Russia; China (Future Location); Tenerife, Spain; Central African Republic; India
- Products: Fried chicken, Chicken sandwiches, Wraps, French fries, Salads, Soft drinks, Milkshakes
- Website: www.southernfriedchicken.com

Southern Fried Chicken, is a British-based fast food outlet headquartered in Reading, England. It operates a franchise network in the United Kingdom and worldwide. Southern Fried Chicken has 93 locations in 15 countries.

== History ==
Southern Fried Chicken was founded in the 1970s by Arthur Withers. In 1973, Withers travelled to the US to work for Barbeque King, where he improved his knowledge of the commercial fast food business. Withers visited Greenville, South Carolina, where he studied the cuisine of fried chicken.

In 1983, Southern Fried Chicken moved into its present headquarters, complete with its own manufacturing department.

In 1999, Southern Fried Chicken met The Alendvic Company and started to expand his company of fried chicken in Russia, starting in the Perm region. The Perm region now hosts over 25 outlets.

The company is currently headed by Arthur's son, Andrew Withers.

== Outlets ==
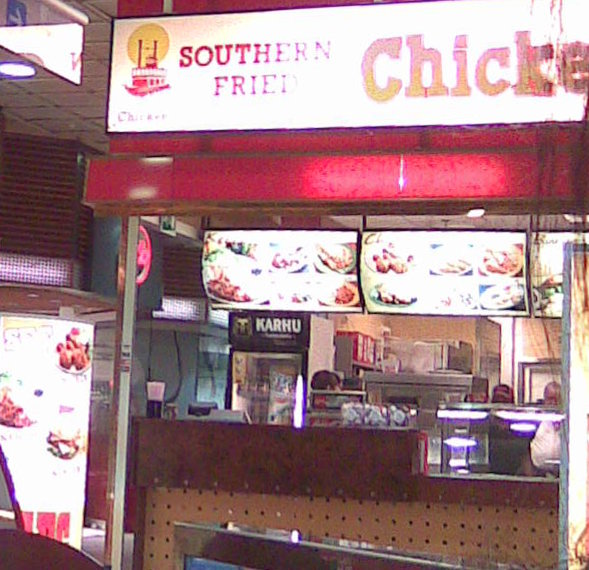
Southern Fried Chicken at the Forum shopping centre in Helsinki (Finland)

Southern Fried Chicken is currently sold in over 700 locations, in over 79 countries worldwide. Restaurants have consistent interior designs and are clean, spacious and comfortable.

Southern Fried Chicken operates in Europe, Arabia, Middle East, North and sub-Saharan regions, South America, and India. They are attempting to open the Chinese Market.

== Undercover Boss ==
In July 2011, Andrew Withers took part in the Channel 4 documentary series Undercover Boss, where he went undercover to work at various franchises in the United Kingdom.
