= Boxall =

Boxall is a surname. Notable people with the name include:

- Danny Boxall (born 1977), English footballer
- Margaret Boxall, English badminton player
- Michael Boxall (born 1988), New Zealand footballer
- Richard Boxall (born 1961), English professional golfer
- Steve Boxall (born 1987), British speedway rider
- Thomas Boxall, English cricketer
- Tony Boxall (1929–2010), British photographer
- William Boxall (1800–1879), British painter

== See also ==
- Boxall baronets
