= Rid Grachev =

Soviet and Russian writer and translator

- Рид Иосифович Грачёв
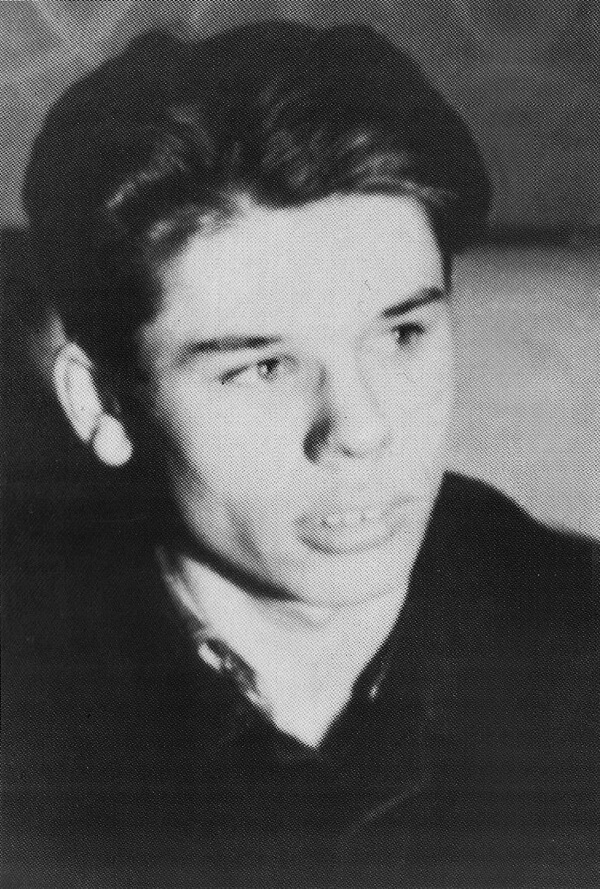
- Born: Rid Iosifovich Vite; 18 July 1935; Leningrad, Soviet Union
- Died: 1 November 2004 (aged 69); Saint Petersburg, Russia
- Education: Leningrad State University
- Spouse: Lyudmila Kuznetsova
- Writing career
- Language: Russian
- Years active: 1953—1970
- Genres: Poetry, fiction

Rid Iosifovich Grachev (née Vite, Russian: Вите), also spelled Reed or Reid (Russian: Рид Иосифович Грачёв) (18 July 1935 – 1 November 2004) was a Soviet and Russian poet, writer, translator and essayist; who influenced and was a close friend several Leningrad authors of the late 1950s—early 1960s, including Vera Panova, Sergey Dovlatov and, most notably, Joseph Brodsky.

== Biography ==
Grachev was born on 18 July 1935 in Saint Petersburg into a single-parent family headed by his mother. Having lost her during the Siege of Leningrad, Rid spent eight years in an orphanage, the period he later described in his works numerous times. After graduating from the Leningrad State University in 1959, Grachev, a fluent French speaker, was involved in translating Antoine de Saint-Exupéry for Soviet readers, as well as writing some articles and essays on French literature. Later on, he started writing his own stories and soon became one of the most influential "young authors" in Leningrad, along with Andrei Bitov, Alexander Kushner, and many others. Even though his short stories were denied publication again and again due to censorship, he gained fame as part of the "New Petersburg Prose" movement, with his fiction and essays being distributed by the Samizdat. His only published book was a set of short stories entitled «Где твой дом?» (Where's Your Home?). Unsurprisingly, the book, containing six short stories, was cut by the censors. He was never published again during the Soviet times, with two books of his previously unreleased works seeing the light of day in 1994 and 2014.

== Mental illness and death ==
Starting from 1965, Grachev began to suffer from schizophrenia, possibly triggered by an incident when he was involved in a street brawl being drunk and got severely beaten up; also, his grandfather was reported to have a mental disease of his own, which Rid could have inherited. A reference to Grachev's illness was made by Sergey Dovlatov in his 1979 novel The Invisible Book. There, Dovlatov tells a story of how he collected donations for Reed, who was «undergoing treatment», from the Leningrad authors and journalists. In the end of the story, he sadly admits Grachev to be «hopelessly insane».

In 1994, Grachev had to have one of his legs amputated when a gangrene set in it. Even tied to a wheelchair, Grachev, with the help of Elisabeth Markstein, an Austrian translator, published his second book, entitled «Ничей брат» (Nobody's Brother), ready for publishing. This book included all of his works known by that time.

Reed Grachev died on 1 November 2004 in his home in St. Petersburg in misery and totally mentally disabled.

== Legacy ==
In 1967, Joseph Brodsky, a close friend of Grachev's, wrote a metaphorical «protection document» for him, calling him «the greatest homme de lettres of today». In 2013, the Zvezda magazine, edited by Yakov Gordin, another Petersburg author and Grachev's friend, published an anthology of his works in two volumes. This led to Reed Grachev's prose being discussed again in the present day.
