= Viridor =

British recycling company

Viridor Limited
- Company type: Subsidiary
- Industry: Waste
- Founded: 1956
- Headquarters: Taunton, England
- Number of locations: 320 facilities
- Key people: Ian Wakelin (Chairman); Kevin Bradshaw (Chief Executive Officer)
- Revenue: £672 million (2023)
- Net income: £167 million (2023)
- Parent: KKR
- Website: www.viridor.co.uk

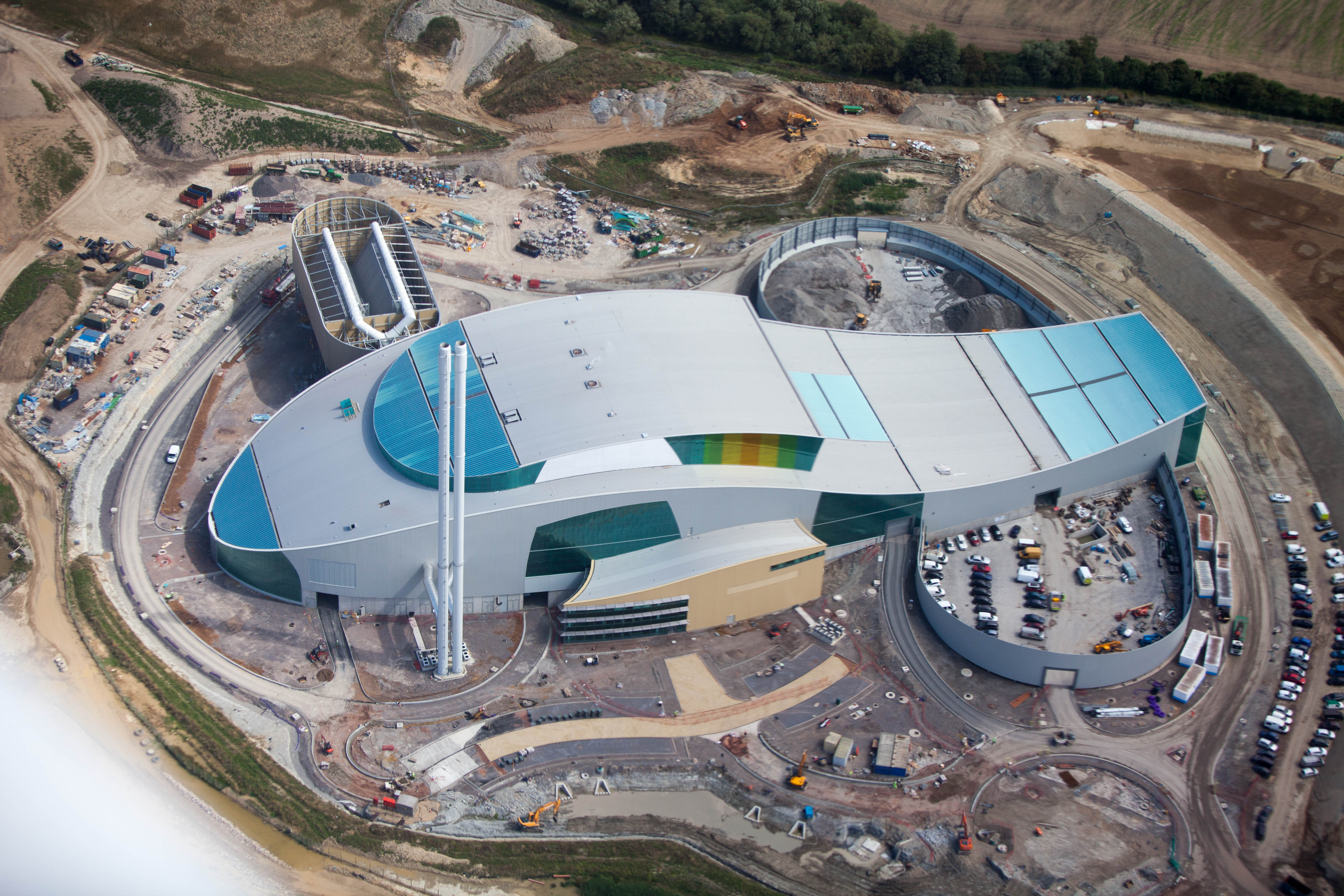
Viridor waste to energy plant in Ardley, Oxfordshire

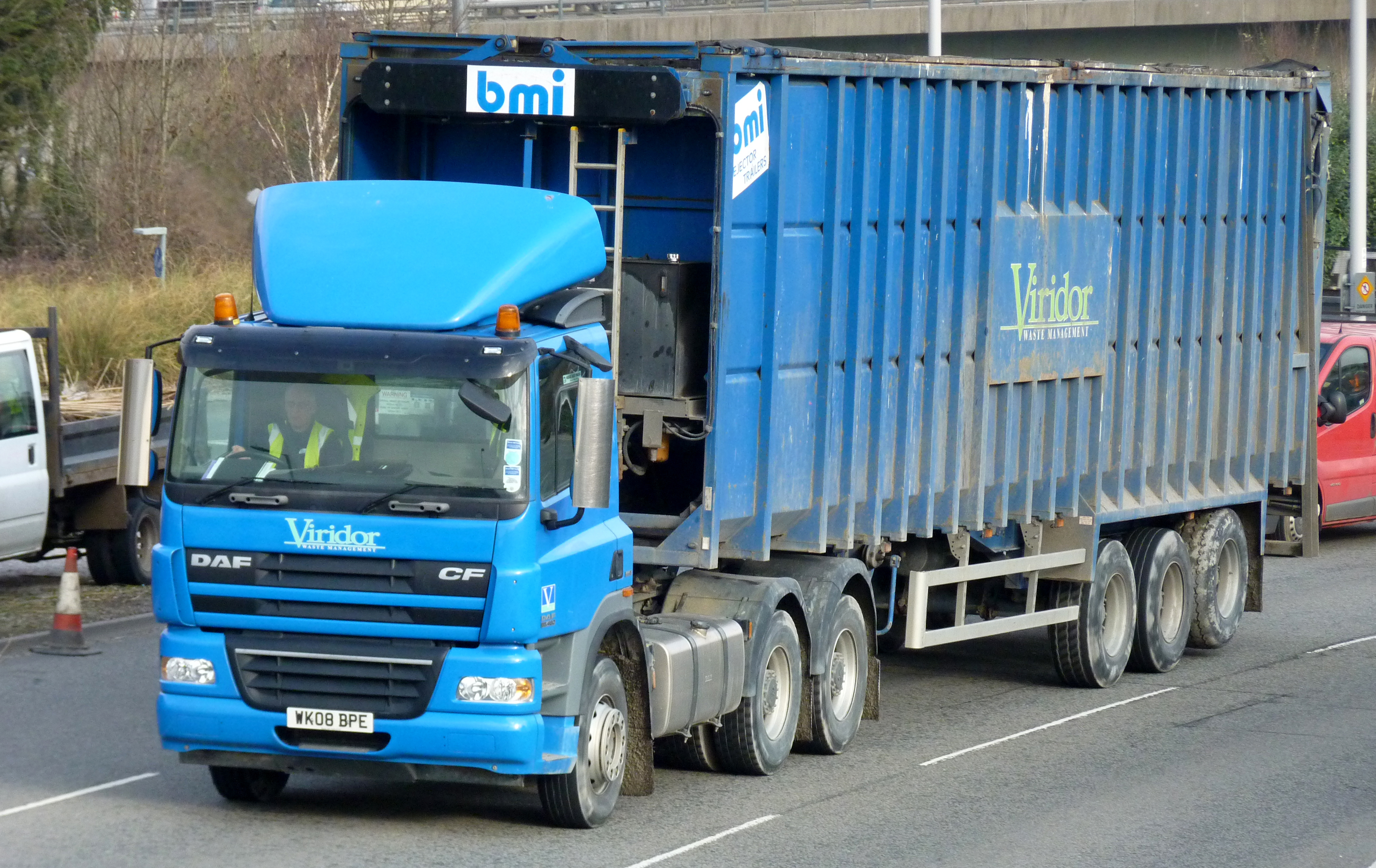
Viridor waste collection truck in Plymouth

Viridor Limited (from the Latin 'to become green') is a recycling and waste management company in the United Kingdom owned by KKR.

== History ==
The company was formed in 1956 as Harrison Western Limited, later becoming Haul Waste Limited. Haul Waste became part of Pennon in 1993, and grew by purchasing companies in the waste collection and landfill disposal market.

In 1995 it bought Blue Circle Waste Management, bringing about South West Water's name change to Pennon Group in 1998, and the merger of Haul Waste and Blue Circle Waste Management under Viridor. It subsequently acquired part of Churngold's waste business in June 2003, Thames Waste Management in 2004, Somerset LAWDC Wyvern Waste in 2006, Grosvenor Waste Management and Skipaway Holdings in 2007, and Shore Recycling in 2008. Later in 2015 Viridor took over the collection side of Dorset based waste company Commercial Recycling.

Today the business is valued at around £4 billion, with recent acquisitions and growth focused on expanding the company's recycling and energy from waste capacity. Viridor was awarded the Greater Manchester Waste Disposal Authority's Waste PFI contract, the largest waste and renewable energy contract in the UK.

On 12 August 2010, the company was featured on Channel 4 documentary Undercover Boss, in which Chief Executive Colin Drummond went undercover as a new recruit inside the company.

In March 2020, KKR agreed terms to buy Viridor in a £4.2 billion deal. The transaction was completed on 8 July 2020.

== Viridor Credits ==
As part of the Landfill Communities Fund tax credit scheme, Viridor created the Viridor Credits scheme which in 2001 to distribute funds to communities for heritage and biodiversity projects. It reported £7.6m in grants in 2017/18.
