= Park Resorts =

Travel agency in the United Kingdom

Park Resorts Limited
- Company type: Private Limited Company
- Industry: Holiday / Caravan Parks
- Founded: 8 March 2001
- Founder: DF Vaughan, A Castledine, RJ Sewell
- Defunct: November 2015
- Fate: Merged with Parkdean Holidays
- Successor: Parkdean Resorts
- Headquarters: Hemel Hempstead (administrative head office); London (group registered office)
- Number of locations: 48 Caravan Parks in UK
- Key people: John Waterworth; Martin Robinson; Ian Gill; Mark Harper; Judith Archibold; Maggie Pavlou
- Products: Caravan Parks; Caravan Sales; On site retail services
- Revenue: ▲£169.25m (2014)
- Operating income: ▲£21.31m (2014)
- Net income: ▼-£5.02m (2014)
- Owner: Electra Partners, GI Partners Fund II LLP (USA) via Dome Finance Sarl
- Number of employees: 1960
- Parent: Dome Holdings Ltd
- Subsidiaries: Park Resorts Transport Ltd
- Website: park-resorts.com

Park Resorts was a holiday park operator with 48 holiday parks located across the United Kingdom.

Holiday parks were mainly located at or near the seaside, primarily on the south and east coasts of England, but also extending to Scotland, Wales, the Isle of Wight, and the Lake District. Income was generated from rentals of static holiday caravans and touring pitches, alongside caravan and holiday home sales and on-site retail.

Park Resorts employed over 3,500 people during the peak holiday season, including the support team at their head office in Hemel Hempstead, Hertfordshire. Park Resorts had over 16,000 caravan or holiday home owners and over 1 million holidaymakers visited their parks each year.

In 2015, Park Resorts merged with Parkdean Holidays, another UK holiday park operator, to form Parkdean Resorts. The new company now operates 71 holiday parks across the UK after acquiring Vauxhall Holiday Park in Great Yarmouth. Park Resorts and Parkdean operated separately throughout 2016 before launching a new website and rebranding all the parks as Parkdean Resorts.

== History ==
Park Resorts was created in March 2001 when CBPE (Close Brothers Private Equity), in partnership with a management buyout team of three led by David Vaughan, purchased twelve Haven freehold caravan parks from Bourne Leisure Ltd. The deal was finalised in May 2001 at a reported cost of £46 million.

In December 2004 Park Resorts was sold to Capital for £165 million, and its activities were merged with the GB Holiday Parks business (itself bought by ABN AMRO for £105 million just one month previously) to form the second-largest caravan park operator in the UK. The name 'Park Resorts' was retained as the company name and brand title.

In March 2007, the business was acquired in a highly leveraged buy-out backed by GI Partners for £440 million. In the same year, the three founding directors left the business and Martin Grant joined from Roadchef as Chief Executive and a further three sites were acquired this year, with a number of GB Holiday Parks sites upgraded as well. In April 2008, GI injected £15 million capital into the Parks Resorts business. In December 2008, in increasingly difficult trading conditions, GI reinstated the original three directors, with David Vaughan resuming as chief executive. By 2009, the financial position had improved.

During the 2009 season, Andy Edge, the marketing director at Park Resorts, went and bought Breydon Water, Great Yarmouth and Lower Hyde, Isle of Wight as part of the Channel 4 television series The Undercover Boss. In an interview after the show Mr Edge told how the show has generated a very positive response from both customers and staff.

In September 2009, Martin Grant, the former chief executive, and his colleagues Colin Bramhall and Richard Hunt, won a case of unfair dismissal against GI Partners on the grounds of a "flagrant breach of dismissal procedures" and were awarded £45,000 in compensation.

In October 2009, a restructuring of the group's £325 million debt facilities was agreed with the main creditor banks which also included a new £25 million senior debt facility to allow a five-year investment programme to proceed.

Two further parks were brought under the operation and branding of the group for the 2010 season, the Bryanston Kenmore sites at Southview, Skegness and at Manor Park, Hunstanton, bringing the total to 42.

The director's report for the year ended 31 March 2011 detailed a 6% increase in turnover for the year to £158.8 million and an operating loss of £9.6 million but forecasted the company should return to profit in future years. The company was dependent on the parent, Dome Holdings Ltd, to keep it a going concern.

In 2011, the company introduced the strapline, Creating Amazing Memories, to appear below the logo of Park Resorts on all publicity material, letterheads and signages. In October 2011, Park Resorts was ranked 244 (2010 = 215) in the annual Sunday Times HSBC Top Track 250 league table based on Britain's biggest mid-market private companies by latest sales. In February 2012, Park Resorts was ranked 49 in The Sunday Times Deloitte Buyout Track 100 league table based on Britain's mid-market private-equity-backed companies with the fastest-growing profits over the last two years. (Note: profits used by Fast Track for this ranking are based on the parent, Dome Holdings Ltd)

In July 2013, Park Resorts secured new lead shareholders, Electra Partners, and appointed a new CEO. The company also refinanced its debt package, freeing up significant capital to invest in its parks over the next four years. David Vaughan became Park Resorts' chairman, following 12 years as founder and CEO, and David Boden joined the company as CEO, having held senior board level positions at Rank Group Plc and Hippodrome Casinos Ltd.

In September 2013, the Park Resorts management team and Electra Partners led the acquisition of South Lakeland Parks, a holiday parks operator with nine parks in the English Lake District and Morecambe Bay area. Park Resorts entered into a contract to manage South Lakelands parks at the time of the transaction. Operating together, the two businesses created the largest holiday parks operator in the UK with 48 properties.

In July 2014, Electra Partners acquired Southview and Manor Park holiday parks in partnership with Park Resorts, which had been managing both parks since 2010. In April 2015, Park Resorts acquired Summerfields Holiday Park near Great Yarmouth and in May 2015, Alan Parker CBE was appointed Chairman of the Group.

In 2015 Parkdean and Park Resorts merged to create Parkdean Resorts. The new company had head offices in Newcastle and Hemel Hempstead and continued to operate under two brands "Parkdean" and "Park Resorts" during 2016. The merger created the largest holiday park operator in the UK, with 71 holiday parks, 1.8 million customers, 22,200 caravan owners, 35,400 pitches and sold 400,000 domestic holidays across their estate.

The following sites were in operation in 2011:

Devon

- Bideford Bay (near Clovelly) ‡

Isle of Wight

- Thorness Bay (near Cowes)
- Lower Hyde (Shanklin)
- Landguard (Shanklin)
- Nodes Point (near Bembridge)

Kent & Sussex

- Camber Sands (Camber Sands)
- Romney Sands (New Romney) ‡
- St Margaret's Bay (near Dover) ‡

Essex

- Waterside at St. Lawrence Bay (near Maldon)
- Coopers Beach (Mersea Island) ‡
- Weeley Bridge (near Clacton-on-Sea)
- Highfield Grange (Clacton-on-Sea)
- Valley Farm (Clacton-on-Sea) ‡
- Naze Marine (Walton-on-the-Naze)

East Anglia & Lincolnshire

- Kessingland Beach (near Southwold Suffolk)
- Breydon Water (near Great Yarmouth Norfolk)
- California Cliffs (near Great Yarmouth Norfolk) ‡
- Manor Park (Hunstanton Norfolk)
- Heacham Beach (near Hunstanton Norfolk) ‡
- Southview (Skegness Lincolnshire)
- Summerfields (near Great Yarmouth Norfolk) ‡
- Sunnydale (near Mablethorpe Lincolnshire)

Yorkshire

- Withernsea (Withernsea East Riding of Yorkshire)
- Skipsea Sands (Skipsea East Riding of Yorkshire)
- Barmston Beach (near Bridlington East Riding of Yorkshire) ‡
- Cayton Bay (near Scarborough, North Yorkshire)

North East England

- Crimdon Dene (near Hartlepool County Durham)
- Whitley Bay (Whitley Bay Tyne & Wear) ‡
- Sandy Bay (Ashington Northumberland)
- Church Point (Newbiggin-by-the-Sea Northumberland) ‡
- Cresswell Towers (Druridge Bay Northumberland) ‡

Scotland

- Eyemouth (Eyemouth Scottish Borders)
- Sandylands (Saltcoats Ayrshire)

Wales

- Ty Mawr (Abergele North Wales)
- Brynowen (Aberystwyth Wales)
- Carmarthen Bay (Kidwelly South Wales) ‡

North West & Lake District

- Ocean Edge (Heysham Lancashire)
- Regent Bay (Morecambe Lancashire)
- Fallbarrow (Windermere Cumbria)
- Gatebeck (Endmoor Cumbria)
- Hawthorne Sands (Morecambe Lancashire)
- White Cross Bay (Windermere Cumbria)
- Limefitt (Windermere Cumbria)
- Todber Valley (Gisburn Clitheroe)

( ‡ denotes parks not offering camping and/or touring facilities)

== Former parks ==
- Shurland Dale (Isle of Sheppey) (Under ownership)
- Ashcroft Coast (Isle of Sheppey) (Under ownership)
- Warden Springs (Isle of Sheppey) (Under ownership)
- Martello Beach (Essex) (under ownership) (Sold to Park Holidays)

== Branding ==
=== Mascots ===
Park Resorts had three mascots in a group called 'Sparky's Krew', consisting of anthropomorphic good rabbits 'Sparky' and 'Sparkle' and naughty aardvark 'Naarky'. The characters were seen in a live production at Park Resorts sites called 'Live with the Krew'. In 2016, after the merger and the creation of Parkdean Resorts, Sid the Seagull and Lizzie the Lizard from Parkdean joined Sparky, Sparkle and Naarky to create the 'Starland Krew'. Younger under 6's can join Pipsqueak the mouse who participates with children in easy challenges among other things. Pipsqueak herself also joins the 'Starland Krew' in productions like "The Magic of Startown". Both mascots from Parkdean had received new outfits and makeovers to make it more suiting.
