= Annette Rid =

Bioethicist and physician-scientist

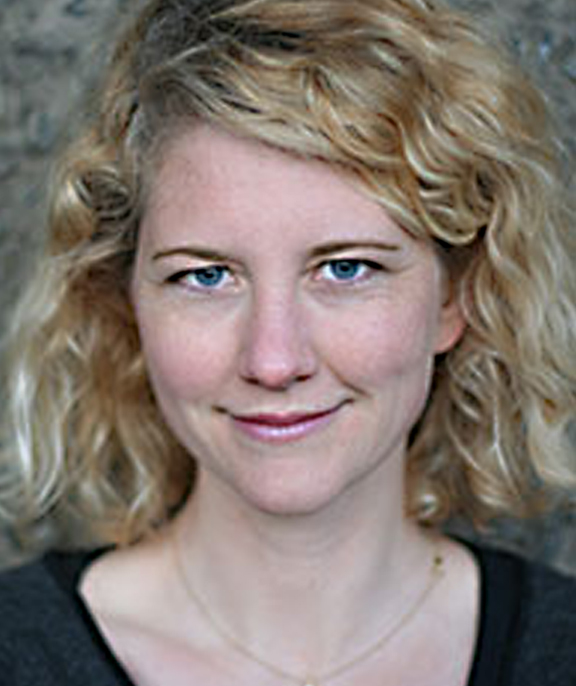
- Rid in 2018
- Born: Annette Schulz-Baldes
- Education: University of Freiburg; University of Zurich
- Scientific career
- Fields: Bioethics
- Workplaces: King's College London; Kennedy Institute of Ethics; National Institutes of Health Clinical Center

Annette Rid (née Schulz-Baldes) is a bioethicist and physician-scientist specialized in research ethics, global health ethics, and justice in health and health care. She works at the National Institutes of Health Clinical Center.

== Education ==
Rid graduated from University of Freiburg with a B.A. (2002) in philosophy and history, a M.D. (2003), and a Ph.D. (2004) in physiology, summa cum laude. In 2013, she completed a habilitation in biomedical ethics at the University of Zurich.

== Career ==
Rid was a senior lecturer and then reader in bioethics and society in the department of global health and social medicine at the King's College London from October 2012 to August 2018. She was an assistant research professor in the Kennedy Institute of Ethics from September 2018 to March 2019.

Rid is a bioethicist at the National Institutes of Health Clinical Center. She serves as a liaison between the NIH Clinical Center's Department of Bioethics and the Division of AIDS at the National Institute of Allergy and Infectious Diseases, where she provides ethics consultation and educational support. She is also a visiting professor at the Department of Global Health and Social Medicine, King's College London. Rid's research interests include research ethics, global health ethics, and justice in health and health care.

== Awards and honors ==
In 2012, Rid was awarded the Mark S. Ehrenreich Prize in Healthcare Ethics Research (second prize) by the International Association of Bioethics. She was elected fellow of The Hastings Center in 2016.
