= Wyldecrest Parks =

UK mobile home park

- Type: Private
- Industry: Real Estate; Retirement
- Headquarters: West Thurrock, Grays, UK
- Area served: UK including England, Wales & Scotland
- Key people: Alfie Best; (Chairman); Waseem Hanif; (CEO)
- Products: Residential Park; Homes; Holiday Lodges; Caravans; Golf Club
- Website: www.wyldecrestparks.co.uk

Wyldecrest Parks is a mobile home park company in the United Kingdom, operating about 101 parks including 10 holiday parks.

== History ==
The company was founded in 1991 with the purchase of Lakeview Park in Romford, Essex by its present chairman Alfie Best. It was originally based in Rainham, Essex but later moved its headquarters to West Thurrock, Essex. Wyldecrest Park is a residential mobile home park brand, and Wyldecrest Holiday Park is a sub- brand which focuses on the holiday parks including a golf course.

The company operates a charity called the Wyldecrest Charitable Trust.

In March 2019, Wyldecrest Parks was shortlisted as a finalist for the RESI 2019 awards, in the category of "Retirement Living Operator of the Year".

== Controversies ==
In October 2011, Wyldecrest Parks owner Alfie Best, voluntarily accepted a police caution for an alleged physical assault on one of his residents at Scatterdells Park, Bovingdon. The resident was protesting against alterations to the park. She later pressed charges, with police offering Best either a caution or go to court.

In December 2018, Wyldecrest Parks was ordered by Havering Council to demolish dwellings which they had built at the Lakeview Park property near Romford after it was revealed that the development was on green belt land and lacked planning permission as it was outside of the park's licensed area. Some residents had paid up to £280,000.

In February 2021, Private Eye reported that Wyldecrest Parks had lost a third appeal in a legal battle with a 77 year old resident over inflated site charges for electricity where it was claimed that the company was charging over three times the average daily domestic tariff.

In June 2021, Wyldecrest was fined £100,000 and ordered to pay a further £11,000 in legal fees after it was found by Oxford Magistrates Court to have breached two planning enforcement notices. The company had previously been ordered to remove improvements to a green belt site at Bayworth Mobile Home Park, near Abingdon-on-Thames, which only had permission to be used as a car park.

In February 2023, Wyldecrest Parks were fined £8,000 plus £25,000 in costs after being found guilty in Bristol Magistrates Court of operating a site without a proper licence.

In April 2023, Cornwall Council rejected two applications to transfer site licences to Wyldecrest Parks, on the basis that Wyldecrest Parks had an insufficient interest in the land, that the company could not by itself finance the site and that there was no adequate management structure in place.

In November 2025, Wyldecrest Parks was required to reimburse residents of Tranquility Park in Devon after being found to have over billed residents for electricity by up to £39,000.
