= Tony Boxall =

British photographer

Anthony Gordon Boxall, FRPS (Tony Boxall, 1929–2010) was a British amateur photographer, known for his portrayal of Gypsy life in Britain in the early 1960s.

== Life and career ==
Boxall was born on 15 December 1929 in Redhill, Surrey. He left school at 14, and did manual labour while attending evening classes at Redhill Technical College, gaining City and Guilds qualifications in technical subjects. Boxall thereafter worked in a bookmaking company, in the 1960s running its shop in Horley. After a customer persuaded him to accept a folding camera to settle a gambling debt, Boxall taught himself how to use it. Boxall was a fast learner; he switched to a twin-lens reflex camera (TLR) and energetically attempted to turn professional. This ambition failed but he became an accountant and did much for the Dorking-based Newspaper Press Fund (later renamed the Journalists' Charity).

Tony Boxall was made an associate of the Royal Photographic Society in 1966. He received the fellowship in 1969.

After photographing a Gypsy couple in a Gypsy caravan from his car one day in 1964, ignoring shouted abuse and driving on, Boxall felt remorseful and searched them out to apologize and give them prints. He eventually succeeded and after initial suspicion was allowed to continue photographing them. He did this with two TLRs, one loaded with black and white film and the other with colour. The photographs, taken from 1964 to 1968, show a warm family life amid poverty and lack of amenities. Some of those in black and white were published in book form in 1992; Boxall had delayed as he had felt unqualified to write text that in the end was provided by Brian Raywid. Boxall also sold the photographs via agencies, and in 2007 estimated that this had earned him £70,000.

Boxall died in Horley on 18 December 2010.

== Books by Boxall ==
- Gypsy Camera. Croydon: Creative Monochrome, 1992. ISBN 1-873319-01-0. Text by Brian Raywid.
- Negative to Positive: My Life in Words and Pictures. blurb.com (here).

== Exhibitions ==
- Royal Photographic Society (Bath), 1984 (160 prints).

== Permanent collections ==
- Royal Photographic Society.
- Victoria and Albert Museum (London).
