= Samuel Rid =

Samuel Rid, known by the nom de plume S. R., was the author of The Art of Jugling or Legerdemaine (1612), an apparent sequel to Martin Markall, Beadle of the Bridewell (1608 or 1610), which, although sometimes attributed to Samuel Rowlands, Rid is also likely to have authored. Martin Markall recounts a history of rogues and Gypsies in England, while the second book describes the legerdemain practiced by those two loosely aligned groups.

== See also ==
- King of the Gypsies
