= Pets Corner =

UK retail store chain for pet care

Pets Corner UK Ltd.
- Type: Private limited company
- Industry: Retail
- Founded: April 1968; 58 years ago in Haywards Heath, West Sussex, England
- Founder: Mark & Sandra Richmond
- Headquarters: Crawley, West Sussex, United Kingdom
- Number of locations: 160 (2025)
- Area served: United Kingdom
- Key people: Dean Richmond (CEO); Steven Defaye (CFO); Simon Forrest; Sarah Bourne; David Pack; Nick Anderson
- Products: Pet food, pet supplies, pet accessories and pet health products
- Revenue: ▲£92.4 million (2024)
- Net income: £4.1 million (2024)
- Total assets: £59.0 million (2024)
- Total equity: £13.7 million (2024)
- Number of employees: 1122 (2026)
- Website: petscorner.co.uk

Pets Corner UK Ltd is a retail store chain that specialises in the sale of specialist pet care products and the provision of pet care services in the United Kingdom.

First established as a family business in 1968, Pets Corner was opened by Mark and Sandra Richmond as a singular retail outlet in Haywards Heath. Today, the company is managed by their son, Dean Richmond, and has an extensive network of over 160 stores. Today's business is led by CEO Dean Richmond, CFO Steven Defaye and Chief Retail Officer, Nick Anderson.

The Pets Corner business forms part of a wider enterprise called Pet Family. Pet Family includes veterinary practices, including Pet Practice, which is operated in partnership with the Johnson family, and Dogwood, a chain of natural dog-grooming spas in the UK.

The Pets Corner business headquarters are located in Crawley, West Sussex, United Kingdom. This site houses key departments such as accounts, digital, training and HR, alongside a store. The company's buying and distribution operations are carried out at a 53,000 sq ft warehouse in Handcross, Sussex.

Significant moments in the retailer’s expansion include opening franchises in several Wyevale Garden Centres in 2008, and acquiring the competitor retailer, PamPurred Pets, in 2016 adding 51 stores to its existing portfolio.

== History ==
Pets Corner began in 1968 when Mark and Sandra Richmond (parents of the present Managing Director Dean Richmond) bought a small shop in Haywards Heath, Sussex, for £2,000. Both had worked in farming and, having owned many pets, they used their accumulated knowledge to open the first Pets Corner as a local hub for animal lovers.

Business demand continued to grow, which eventually required the family establishment to relocate to bigger premises in the 1970s and enabled them to open up their second store in Hove in 1983.

In 1989, at just 15 years old, Mark and Sandra’s son, Dean, joined the business as a sales advisor. Dean went on to manage the Hove and Haywards Heath shops for 10 years and worked with his parents to establish more shops every two to three years.

In 1992, Pets Corner opened its first garden centre concept store in Brighton. During this period, the company introduced its approach of employing academy-trained staff and offering natural-led products.

In 1998, Dean acquired what was then a seven-store chain from his parents.

Pets Corner went on to establish additional garden centre concessions in 1999, with the approval of Country Gardens' CEO, Nicholas Marshall. Following Wyevale's acquisition of Country Gardens in 2000, Pets Corner's expansion of garden centre concessions was momentarily paused. However, in 2008, when Nicholas Marshall assumed the role of CEO at Wyevale, Pets Corner's expansion into Wyevale Garden Centres rapidly resumed.

The Great Recession had a positive impact on Pets Corner as new retail sites and opportunities became available for rental in 2009. The economic crisis meant that these properties were possible to attain at cheaper rates, which gave the business the chance to continue expanding.

In its quest for growth, Pets Corner adopted a strategic approach that involved expanding its services to include veterinary care. This move aimed to enhance the overall customer experience, resulting in The Pet Practice Veterinary Surgery joining the Pets Corner family in 2015. The veterinary practice, which offers a range of services such as routine check-ups, vaccinations, and surgical procedures, is now located on-site at 14 Pets Corner shop locations.

2016 was a pivotal year for Pets Corner as it bought PamPurred Pets, adding 51 sites to the chain. This was also the year that Dogwood, the UK’s first natural grooming spa, was started by Pets Corner. Dogwood joined forces with Pets Corner in 2017, opening their grooming spa within the Pets Corner Camberley store. Today, Dogwood grooming spas can be found in over 50 Pets Corner stores across the country.

Petfoodexpert.co.uk was launched by Pets Corner in 2017, as an online comparison platform for pet owners to assess the nutritional value of popular pet food items.

In February 2018, Pets Corner announced increasing sales and substantial growth, enabling the company to outperform its rivals. This significant milestone demonstrated the company's dedication to sustainable growth and its position as a market leader in the pet industry.

In 2020, due to business growth, Pets Corner moved to a 53,000 square foot distribution centre in Handcross, West Sussex, to support supply chain operations.

In 2021, Pets Corner developed Best Pet For Me, an online service that helps prospective pet owners identify dog and cat breeds suited to their lifestyle and household.

In March 2021, Pet Family acquired Scampers Natural Pet Store, an independent pet retailer based in Soham, Cambridgeshire. Following the acquisition, the business retained the Scampers name and became part of the Pets Corner group.

On 2 October 2023, Pet Family acquired Astrapet, a Midlands-based pet retailer operating Natural World Pets and K9 by Natural World stores. The stores subsequently became part of the Pet Family portfolio while retaining their existing brands.

In 2025, Pets Corner was named UK Multiple Retailer of the Year at the PetQuip Awards.

In 2026, Pets Corner launched Gentle Kitchen, a range of fresh frozen dog food available in four recipes. The range was introduced across Pets Corner stores and online, with the food prepared at a low cooking temperature before being frozen.

== In the media ==
Pets Corner has featured in a number of radio and television programmes, notably Channel 4’s Undercover Boss UK in 2014 and BBC Radio 4’s The Bottom Line, Pets Mean Pounds.

In April 2026, four members of Pets Corner's head-office staff appeared as pet-industry experts on the BBC business reality series The Apprentice.

== Charity ==
Since 2022, Pets Corner has partnered with the U-Hearts Foundation to support animals affected by the war in Ukraine. According to U-Hearts, the retailer has donated and delivered more than 136 tonnes of pet food, helping to feed over 45,000 cats and dogs across 13 regions of Ukraine.
