= Romanichal =

Romani subgroup in the UK

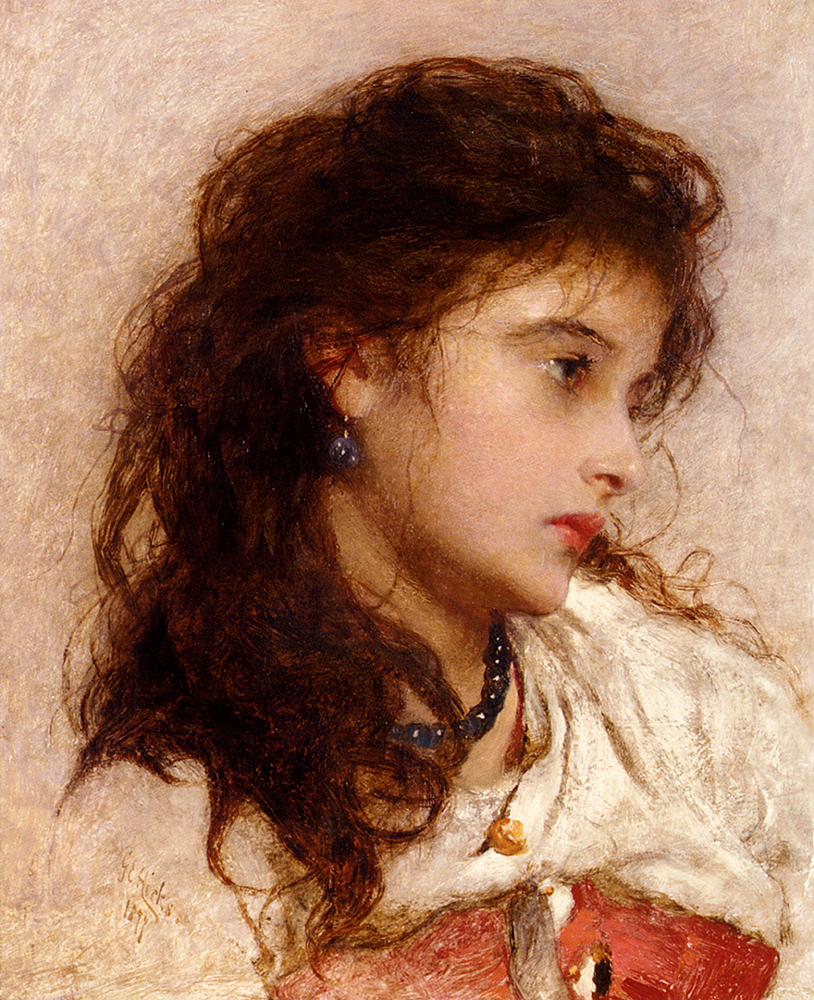
- A Gypsy Girl by George Elgar Hicks (1899)

Regions with significant populations
- United Kingdom: No reliable numbers; UK census data gives fewer than 58,000, though this may be unreliable

Languages
- English and Angloromani

Religion
- Majority: Christianity; Minority: Romani mythology, irreligion

Related ethnic groups
- Other Romani people especially Kale, Lowland Romanis, Romanisael, Kaale, Sinti, and Manouche, English people

The Romanichal (UK: /ˈrɒmənɪtʃæl/ US: /-ni-/), also known as English Gypsies are a Romani subgroup in the United Kingdom. Many Romanichal speak Angloromani, a mixed language that blends Romani vocabulary with English syntax. Romanichal residing in England, Scotland, and Wales are considered part of the Gypsy (Romani), Roma, and Traveller community.

Genetic, cultural, and linguistic findings indicate that the Romani people trace their origins to South Asia, likely in the regions of present-day Punjab, Rajasthan, and Sindh.

== Etymology ==
The word "Romanichal" is derived from Romani chal, where chal is Angloromani for "fellow".

== Distribution ==
Nearly all Romanichal in Great Britain live in England, with smaller communities in South Wales, Northeast Wales, and the Scottish Borders.

In Great Britain, there is a sharp north–south divide among Romanichal. Southern Romanichal live in the South East, South West, Midlands, East Anglia, and South Wales; Northern Romanichal live in the North West, Yorkshire, Scottish Borders, and northeastern Wales. The two groups' dialects differ in accent and vocabulary.

== Language ==
The Romani people in England spoke traditional Romanes—an Indo-Aryan language—until it was largely replaced by English and Angloromani in the 19th century. The variant of Romanes spoken in England closely resembled those of Romani communities in continental Europe. Notable lexical influences included Persian, Armenian, Byzantine Greek, Slavic, Romanian and Arabic. Angloromani is a mixed language that combines the syntax and grammar of English with the Romani lexicon. Today, many Romanichal speak both English and Angloromani, with a small minority believed to speak the traditional Romani language.

There are two dialects of Angloromani: Southern Angloromani (spoken in the Southeast, Southwest, Midlands, East Anglia, and South Wales) and Northern Angloromani (spoken in the Northeast, Northwest, Yorkshire, Scottish Borders, and Northeast of Wales). These two dialects, along with the accents that accompany them, have led to two regional Romanichal identities forming, these being the Southern Romanichal identity and the Northern Romanichal identity.

Many Angloromani words, e.g., pal have been incorporated into English, particularly in the form of British slang.

== History ==
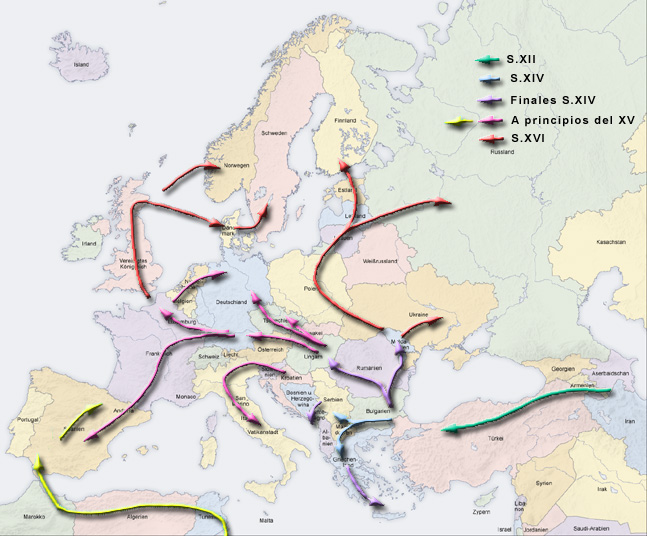
The migration of the Romanis into and within Europe

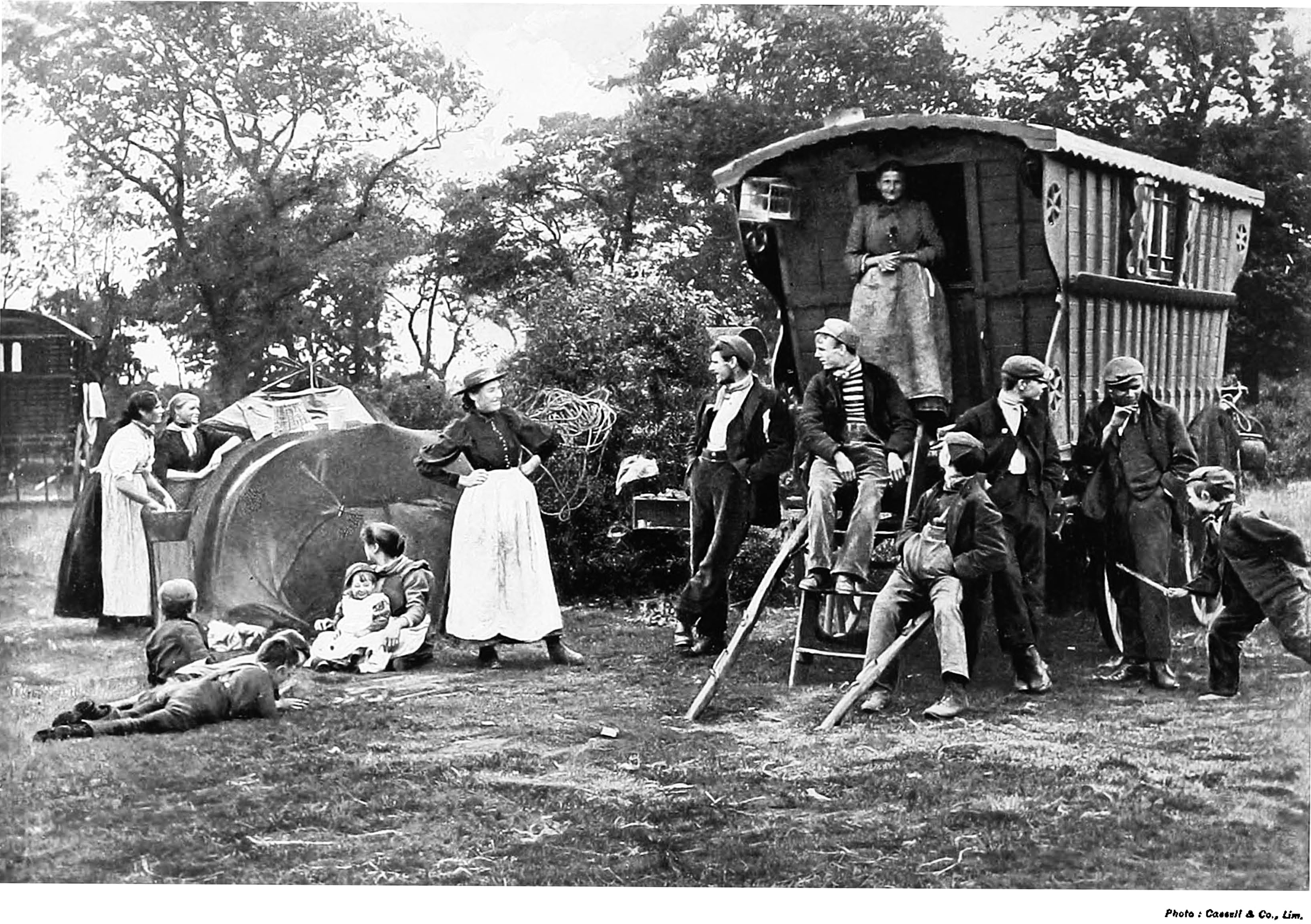
A Romanichal encampment in Essex, England (c. 1898)

The Romani people have origins in South Asia, likely in the regions of present-day Punjab, Rajasthan, and Sindh. They are believed to have migrated westwards in waves beginning in the 5th century. Travelling through West Asia, they settled for a time in Persia and subsequently in Armenia, before their arrival in Anatolia and Thrace in the 9th century, during the Byzantine period. They later expanded throughout the Balkans, during the Ottoman expansion. Due to conflicts in the Balkans, particularly Ottoman wars, they continued their migration farther north and west in the 15th century, arriving in England by the early 16th century, with the earliest arrival recorded in 1512.

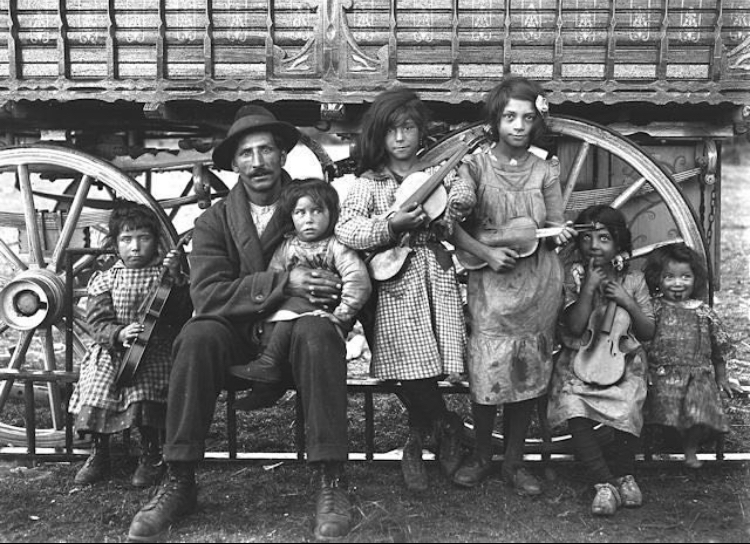
A Romanichal family in Derby, England (1910)

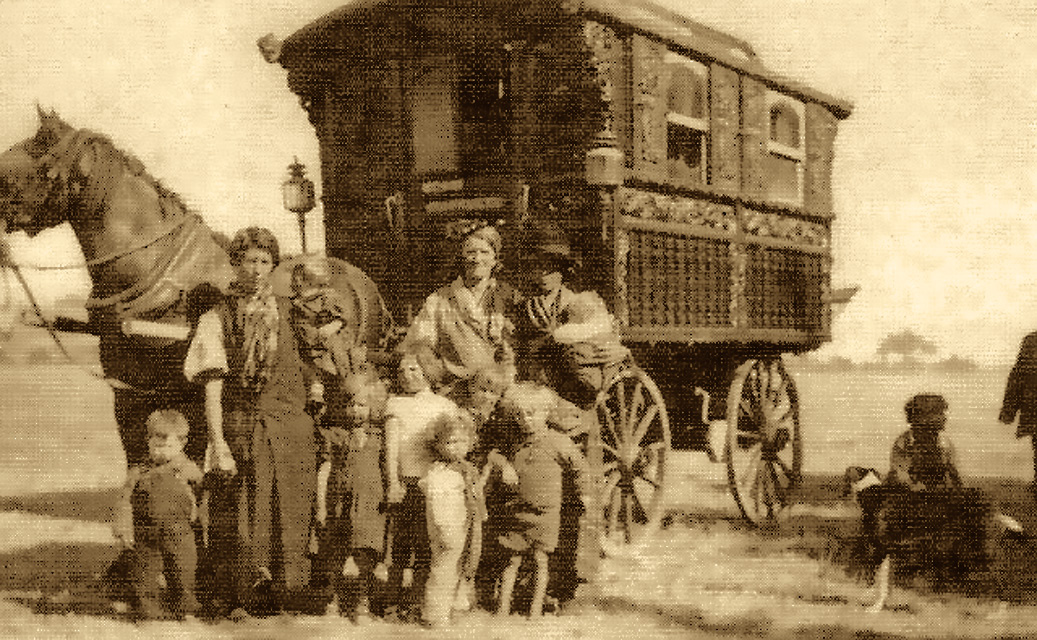
A Romanichal family in Epsom Downs, photographed with their horse (1938)

During the reign of Henry VIII, the Egyptians Act 1530 banned Romanis from entering the country and required those already living there to leave within sixteen days. Failure to do so could result in confiscation of property, imprisonment, and deportation. During the reign of Mary I, the Act was amended by the Egyptians Act 1554, which removed the threat of punishment if Romani people abandoned their "naughty, idle and ungodly life and company" and adopted a sedentary lifestyle, but increased the penalty for non-compliance to death.

In 1562, a new law offered Romanis born in England and Wales the possibility of becoming English subjects if they assimilated into the local population. Despite this new option, the Romani were forced into a marginal lifestyle and subjected to discrimination by the authorities and by many non-Romani. In 1596, 106 men and women were condemned to death at York for being Romani, and nine were executed. Samuel Rid wrote two books about them in the early 17th century.

From the 1780s onwards, the anti-Romani laws were gradually repealed. The identity of the Romanichal was formed between 1660 and 1800, as a Romani group living in Britain.

=== Persecution ===
Hostility and discrimination against Romani people is still present in the UK. In 2008, it was reported that Romanis experienced a higher degree of racism than any other group in the United Kingdom, including asylum-seekers, and a Mori poll indicated that a third of UK residents admitted to being prejudiced against Romanis.

=== Deportations ===
The authorities began to deport Romanichal, principally to Norway, as early as 1544. The process was continued and encouraged by Elizabeth I and James I.

The Kaale, a Romani subgroup in Finland, maintain that their ancestors migrated through Scotland, supporting the idea that the etymological origin of their subgroup's name—and possibly that of the Romanisael in Scandinavia—may derive from the Kale and Romanichal subgroups in the United Kingdom.

In the years following the American War of Independence, Australia was the preferred destination for penal transportation of Romanichal. The exact number of Romanichal deported to Australia is unknown. It has been suggested that three Romanichal were carried by the First Fleet, one of whom is thought to have been James Squire, who founded Australia's first commercial brewery in 1798, and whose grandson, James Farnell, became the first native-born premier of New South Wales in 1877. The total Romani population of Australia seems to have been extremely low, reflecting the fact that Romanichal probably made up just 0.01 per cent of the original convict population of 162,000. However, it has been suggested that they were discriminated against under the transportation laws and may well have been undercounted. Fragmentary records suggest that at least fifty Romani people may have been transported from Britain to Australia.

At least one Romani returned from Australia to England: Henry Lavello (or Lovell) was repatriated with a full pardon and was accompanied to England by a son born to an Aboriginal woman.

=== Indentured labour and slavery ===
In the 17th century, Oliver Cromwell's government shipped Romanichal as indentured labourers to plantations in North America. From a later period, there is documentation of English Romanichal being enslaved by freed blacks in Jamaica, Barbados, Cuba and Louisiana.

== Culture ==
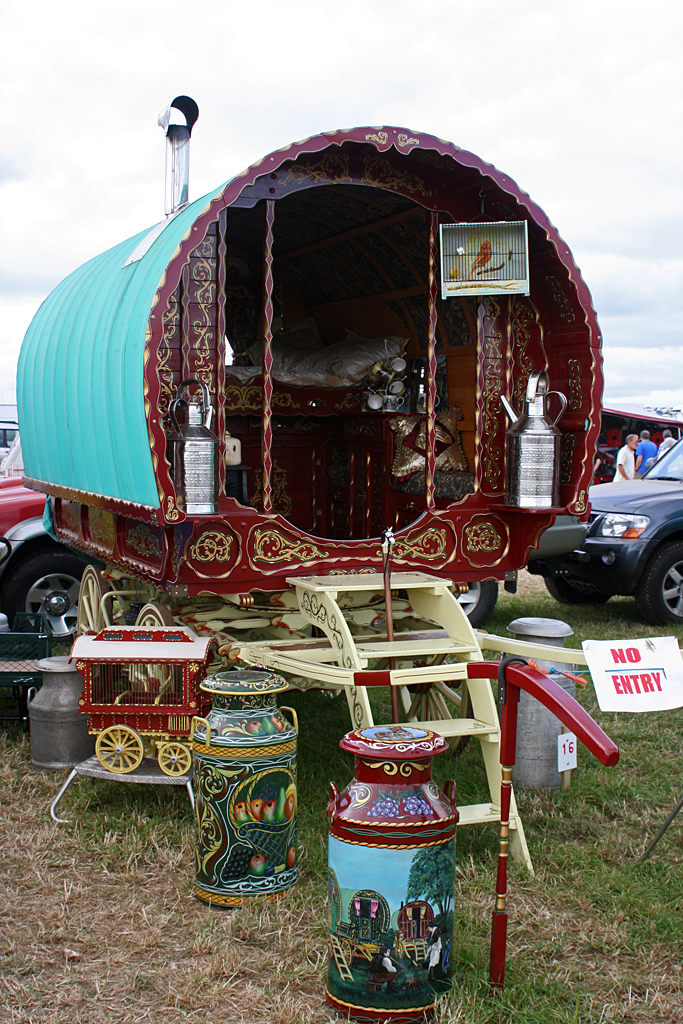
Traditional Romanichal vardo and artwork at the Great Dorset Steam Fair (2007)

Romanichal belong to the wider community of Romani people in the United Kingdom. Important cultural celebrations include International Romani Day, commemorating the inaugural World Romani Congress, held in London in 1971. Romanichal have a distinct ethnic and cultural identity apart from the non-Romani population, whom they refer to as Gorjas, or country people. Prominent features of Romanichal culture include emphasis on the importance of family and extended family, adherence to traditional gender roles, birth and death rituals, emphasis on hygiene and household cleanliness, respect towards their older generations (including by referring to older members of the community as 'aunts' and 'uncles', a common tradition in many Asian cultures), and a traditionally nomadic lifestyle (although the vast majority are now settled). Romanichal social customs have traditionally been influenced by the concept of marimé, or mochadi (ritual impurity). The majority of Romanichal in the UK identify as Christian, and spirituality or religion typically play a significant role in their culture and celebrations.

Historically, Romanichal earned a living doing agricultural work and would move to the edges of towns for the winter months. There was casual work available on farms throughout the spring, summer, and autumn months. Spring would start with seed sowing and planting potatoes and fruit trees, early summer with weeding, and summer to late autumn with the harvesting of crops. Of particular significance was the hop industry, which employed thousands of Romanichal both in spring for vine training and for the harvest in early autumn. Winter months were often spent doing casual labour in towns or selling goods or services door to door. Traditional economic activities included gardening, fortune-telling, hawking, and collecting scrap. Mass industrialisation of agriculture in the 1960s led to the disappearance of many of the casual farm jobs Romanichal had traditionally carried out. Today, Romanichal operate a variety of businesses and are employed in different professions, although many continue to face barriers to education and employment. They have also produced notable athletes, including boxers such as Henry Wharton and Billy Joe Saunders, as well as footballers like Freddy Eastwood.

Didicoy (Angloromani; didikai, also diddicoy, diddykai) is a term occasionally used to refer to a person of mixed Romani and Gorger (non-Romani) blood but is generally considered offensive.

== Travel ==
Originally, Romanichal would travel on foot or with light, horse-drawn carts, and they would build bender tents where they settled for a time, as is typical of other Romani groups. A bender is a type of tent constructed from a frame of bent hazel branches (hazel is chosen for its straightness and flexibility), covered with canvas or tarpaulin.

Around the mid- to late-19th century, the Romanichal began using wagons that incorporated living spaces on the inside. These they called "vardos" and were often brightly and colorfully decorated on the inside and outside. In the present day, Romanichal are more likely to live in houses or caravans.

The vast majority (90%) of 21st-century Romanichal families live in houses of bricks and mortar, whilst a minority still live in mobile homes such as caravans, static caravans, or trailers (with a small fraction still living in vardos).

According to the Regional Spatial Strategy caravan count for 2008, there were 13,386 caravans owned by Romani in the West Midlands region of England, whilst a further 16,000 lived in bricks and mortar. Of the 13,386 caravans, 1,300 were parked on unauthorised sites (that is, on land where Romani were not given permission to park). Over 90% of Britain's travelling Romanichal live on authorised sites, where they pay full rates (council tax).

On most Romanichal traveller sites, there are usually no toilets or showers inside caravans because in Romanichal culture, this is considered unclean, or mochadi. Most sites have separate utility blocks with toilets, sinks, and electric showers. Many Romanichal will not do their laundry inside, especially not underwear, and subsequently many utility blocks also have washing machines. In the days of horse-drawn wagons and vardos, Romanichal women would do their laundry in a river, being careful to wash upper-body garments further upstream from underwear and lower-body garments, and personal bathing would take place much further downstream. In some modern trailers, a double wall separates the living areas from the toilet and shower.

Due to the Caravan Sites Act 1968, which greatly reduced the number of caravans allowed to be pitched on authorised sites, many Romanichal cannot find legal places on sites with the rest of their families.

Today, most Romanichal travel within the same areas that were established generations ago. Most people can trace back their presence in an area over a hundred or two hundred years. Many traditional stopping places were taken over by local governments or by settled individuals decades ago and have subsequently changed hands numerous times. However, travelling Romanichal have long historical connections to such places and do not always willingly give them up. Most families are identifiable by their traditional wintering base, where they will stop travelling for the winter, and this place will be technically where a family is "from".

== Gallery ==
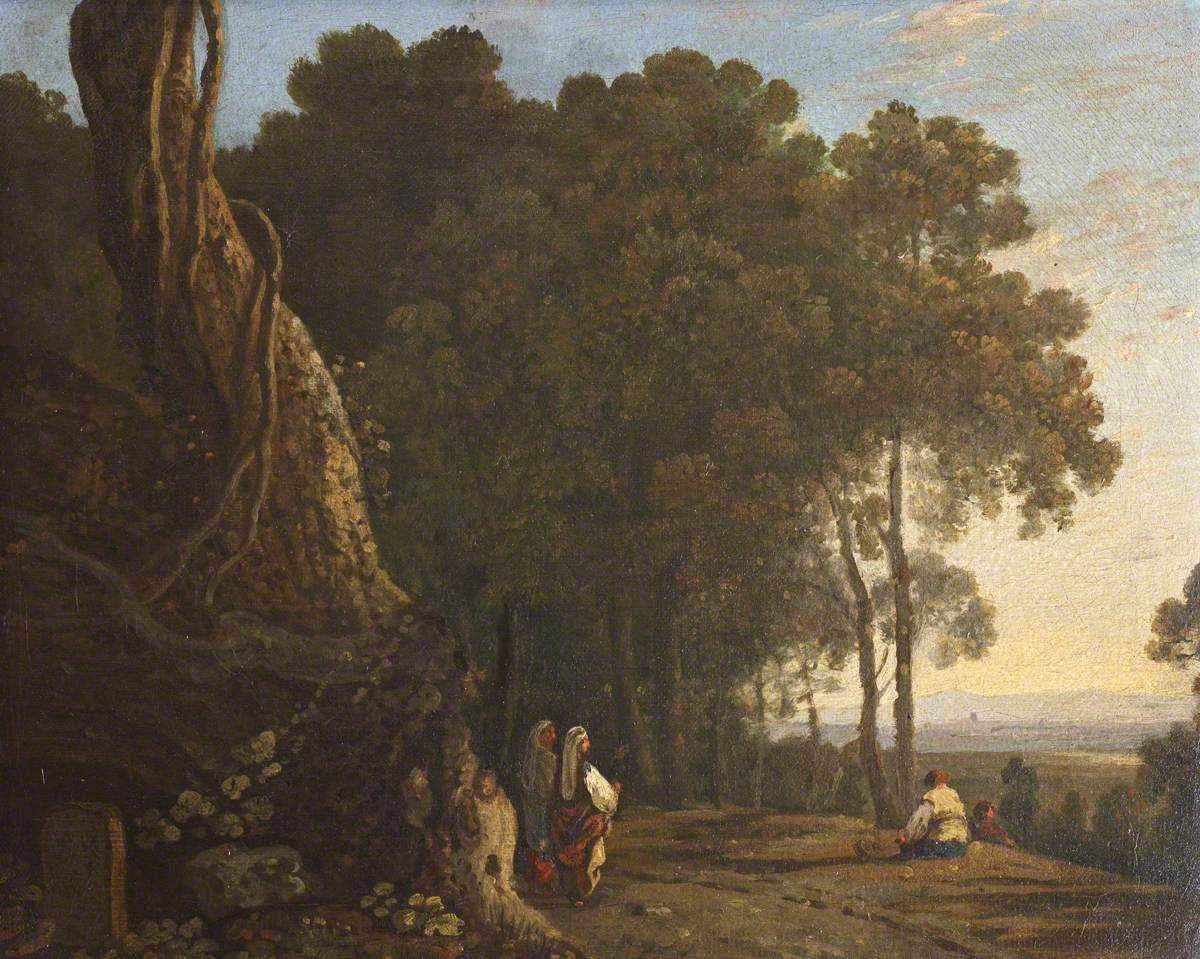
Romanis at the entrance to a forest in England (c. 1771–1779)

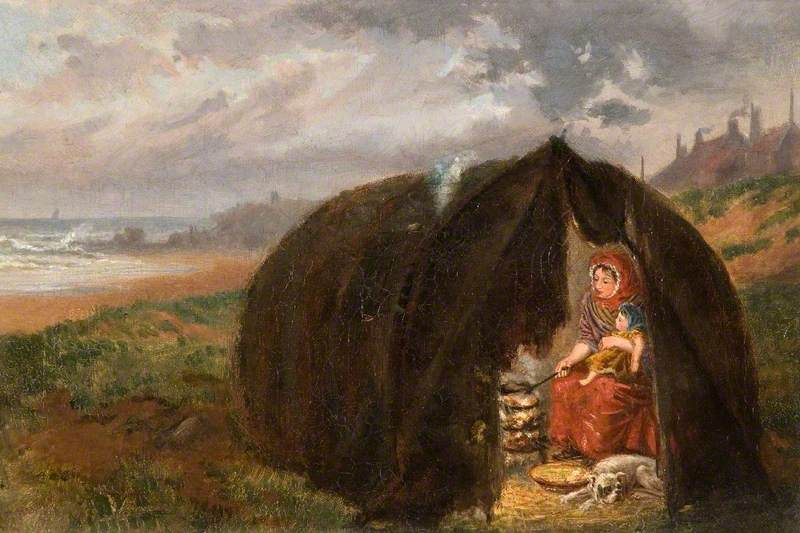
Romanis camped on a beach in England (1876)

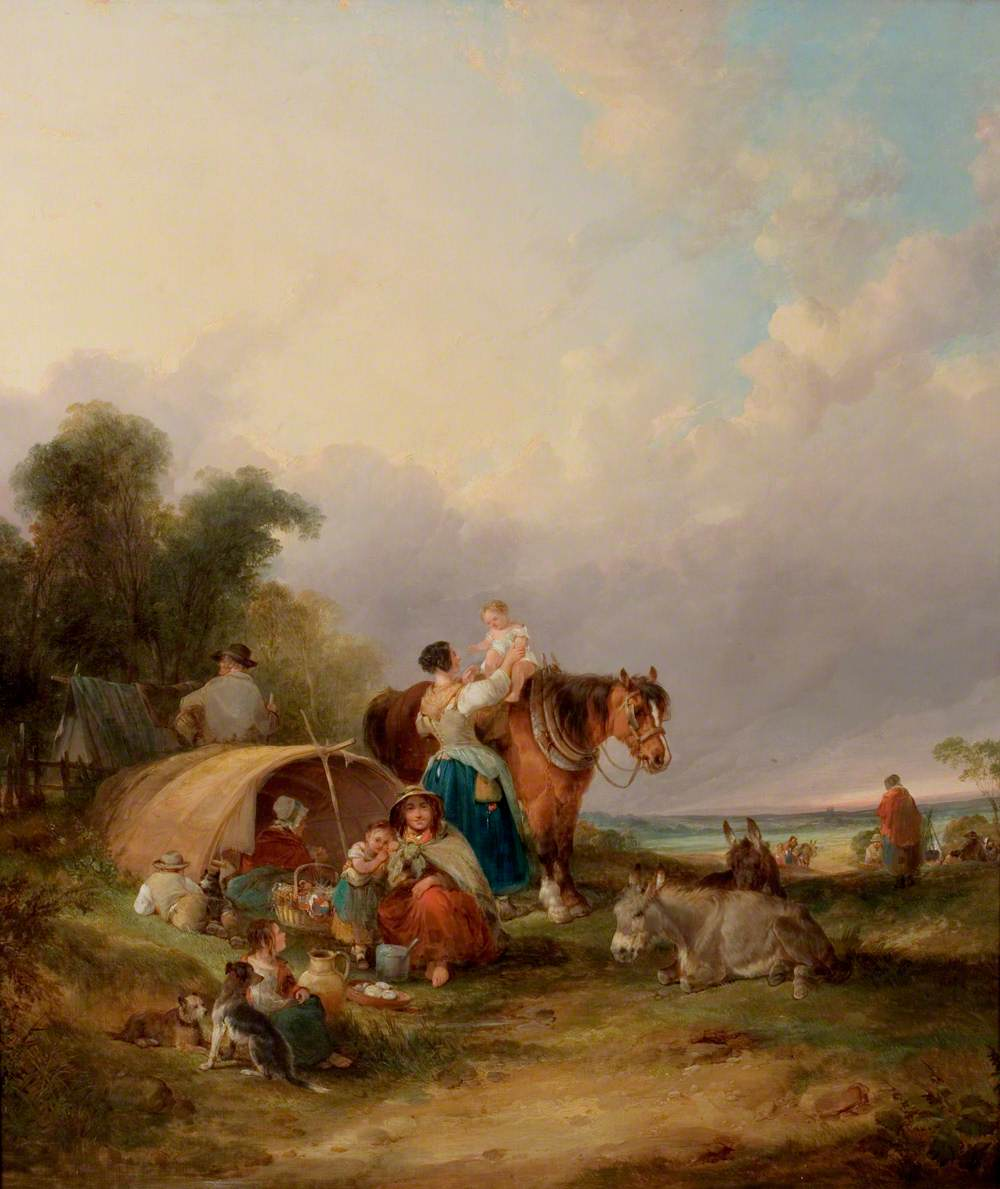
A Romani encampment in England (19th century)

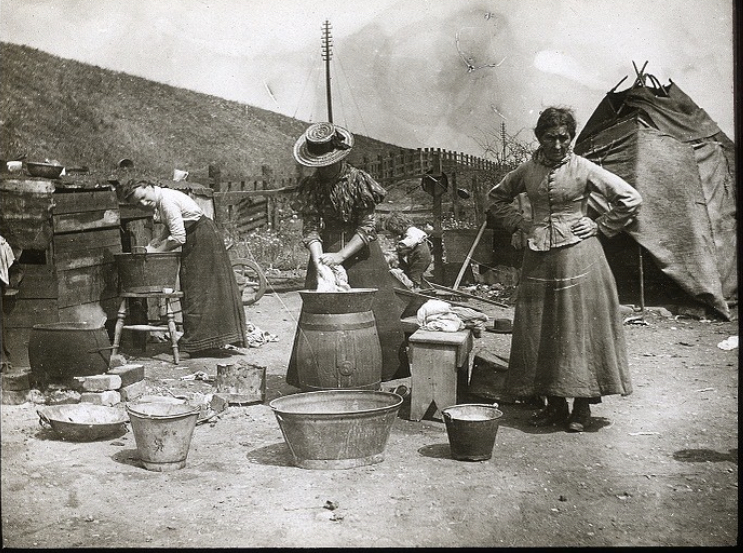
Romanichal in Warwickshire, England (1905)

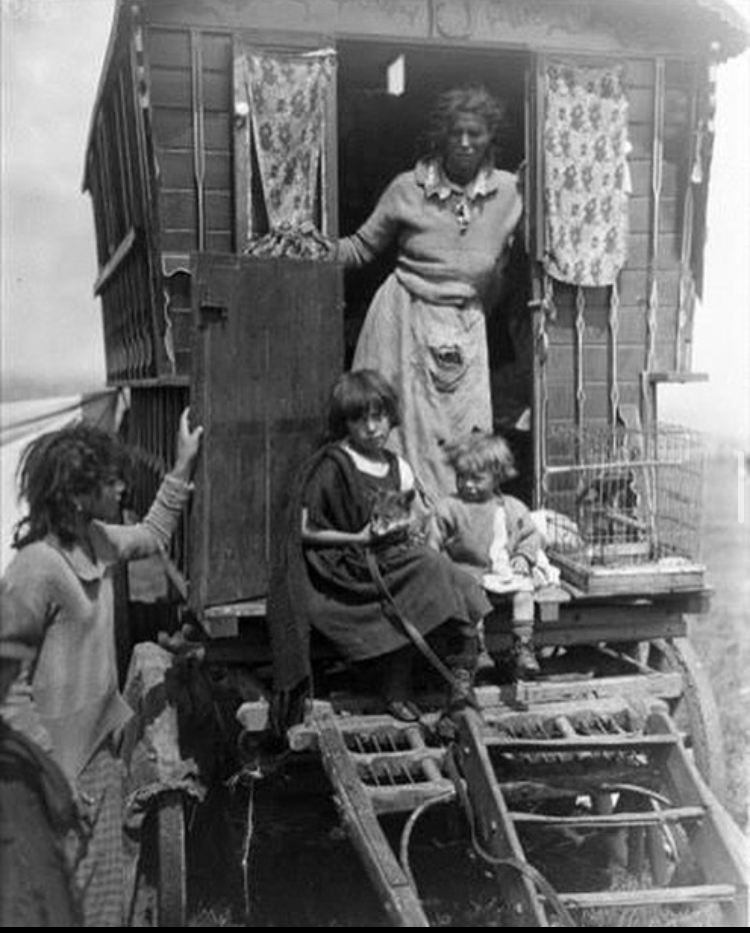
A Romanichal family living in a vardo (1926)

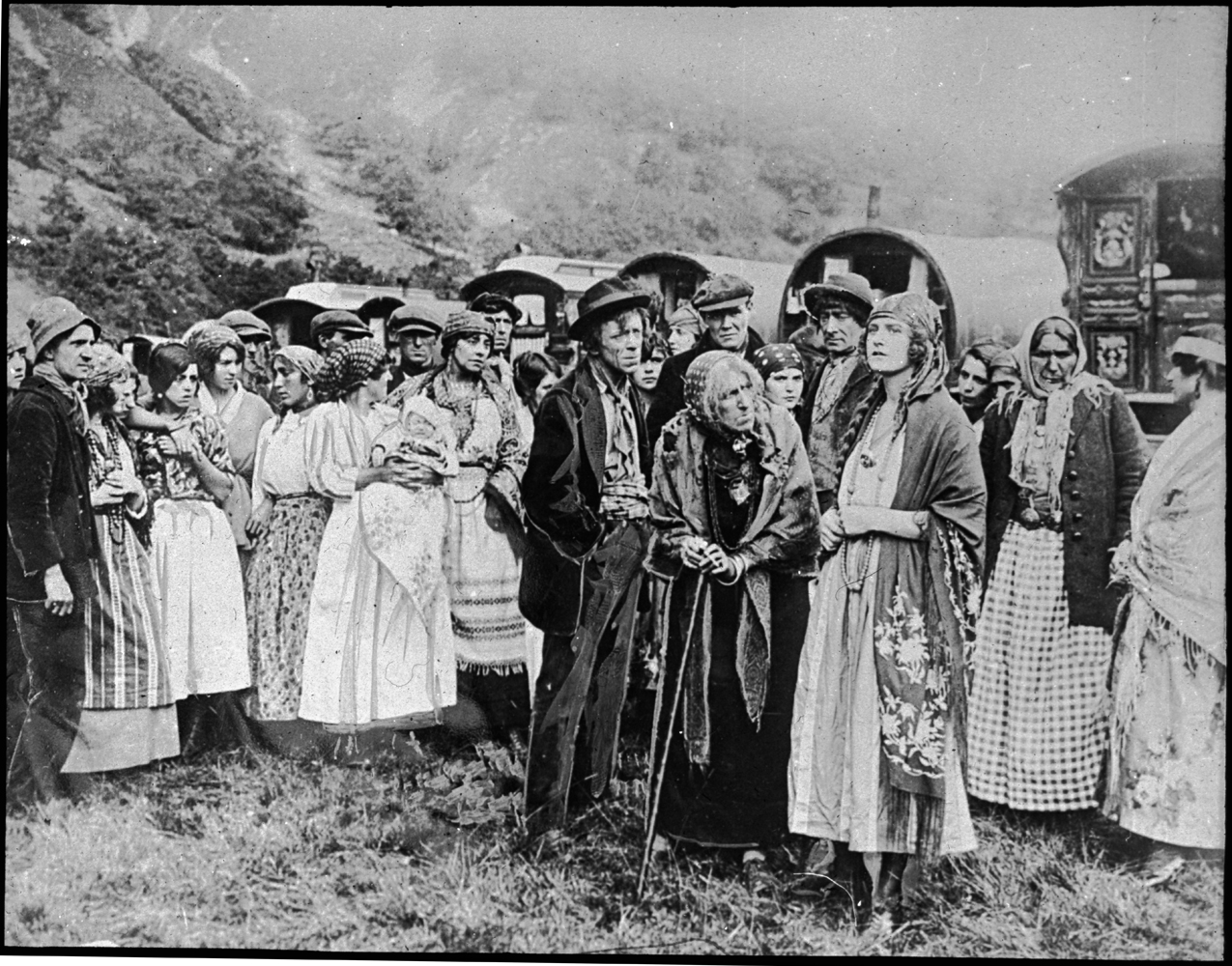
A crowd of Romanis in England (1933)

== See also ==
- Angloromani language
- Gordon Boswell Romany Museum
- Gypsy Cob
- Gypsy Lore Society
- Jumping the broom § British Romani customs
- List of Romanichal-related depictions and documentaries
- List of Romanichals
- Romani studies
- Romani language
- Welsh Romani language

Groups:

- Kaale
- Kale
- Romani people
- Romani people in the United Kingdom
- Romanisael
- Scottish Romani and Traveller groups
