= 842 Naval Air Squadron =

Inactive flying squadron of the Royal Navy's Fleet Air Arm

- Squadron badge
- Active: 1943–1945
- Disbanded: 15 January 1945
- Country: United Kingdom
- Branch: Royal Navy
- Type: Torpedo Bomber Reconnaissance squadron
- Role: Carrier-based: anti-submarine warfare (ASW); anti-surface warfare (ASuW); Maritime patrol; Combat air patrol (CAP)
- Part of: Fleet Air Arm
- Home station: See Naval air stations section for full list.
- Motto: Tantivy
- Engagements: World War II: Battle of the Atlantic; Operation Tungsten; Arctic convoys of World War II
- Battle honours: Atlantic 1943-44; Norway 1944; Arctic 1944

Commanders
- Notable commanders: Lieutenant Commander(A) Charles Bentall Lamb, DSO, DSC,RN

Insignia
- Squadron Badge Description: Blue, over a base barry wavy of six white and blue a winged anchor erect white suspended there from by a riband gold a bugle horn also white (1944)
- Identification Markings: single letters (Swordfish); FA+ (Swordfish aboard HMS Fencer); single letters (Seafire and Wildcat)

Aircraft flown
- Bomber: Fairey Swordfish
- Fighter: Supermarine Seafire; Grumman Wildcat

842 Naval Air Squadron (842 NAS), also referred to as 842 Squadron, is an inactive Fleet Air Arm (FAA) naval air squadron of the United Kingdom’s Royal Navy (RN). The squadron was last operational during World War II, primarily utilising the Fairey Swordfish throughout the conflict. In 1943, it also incorporated the Supermarine Seafire into its fleet, followed by the Grumman Wildcat. Both of these aircraft were deployed for combat air patrol missions, enhancing the squadron's capabilities during the war.

The unit was established at HMS Daedalus, RNAS Lee-on-Solent, in March 1943 as a Torpedo, Bomber, and Reconnaissance (TBR) squadron, initially equipped with Fairey Swordfish torpedo bombers. It subsequently relocated to Scotland for further training, during which it acquired a fighter flight of Supermarine Seafires. In August, the squadron embarked on HMS Fencer, providing anti-submarine support during the occupation of the Azores from October to November 1943. The squadron's fighter capabilities were enhanced in November by the addition of four Grumman Wildcats from 'A' Flight of 1832 Naval Air Squadron, one of which successfully shot down a German aircraft while escorting a convoy to Gibraltar in December. In February, a Fairey Swordfish sank U-666. The number of Fairey Swordfish increased aboard HMS Fencer to escort an Arctic convoy, where they engaged eleven German U-boats, sinking three: U-277 on 1 May, followed by U-674 and U-959 the next day.

In July 1944, the squadron was divided, with some Fairey Swordfish being assigned to HMS Indefatigable and HMS Furious, where they participated in attacks on the German battleship Tirpitz, while the remaining aircraft stayed with HMS Fencer for a convoy mission to Gibraltar. The Grumman Wildcats were transferred to HMS Campania in October 1944, while the Fairey Swordfish were consolidated under RAF Coastal Command in September 1944 for operations in Scotland. The Grumman Wildcats were reassigned to 813 Naval Air Squadron in November 1944, and the Fairey Swordfish were moved to RAF Thorney Island, where the squadron was disbanded in January 1945.

== History ==
=== Torpedo, bomber, reconnaissance squadron (1943-1945) ===
842 Naval Air Squadron was initially scheduled to be established at RNAS Lee-on-Solent (HMS Daedalus), Hampshire, on 1 September 1942; however, it ultimately became operational there on 1 March 1943. The squadron was designated as a Torpedo Bomber Reconnaissance (TBR) unit and was equipped with six Fairey Swordfish II, a biplane torpedo bomber.

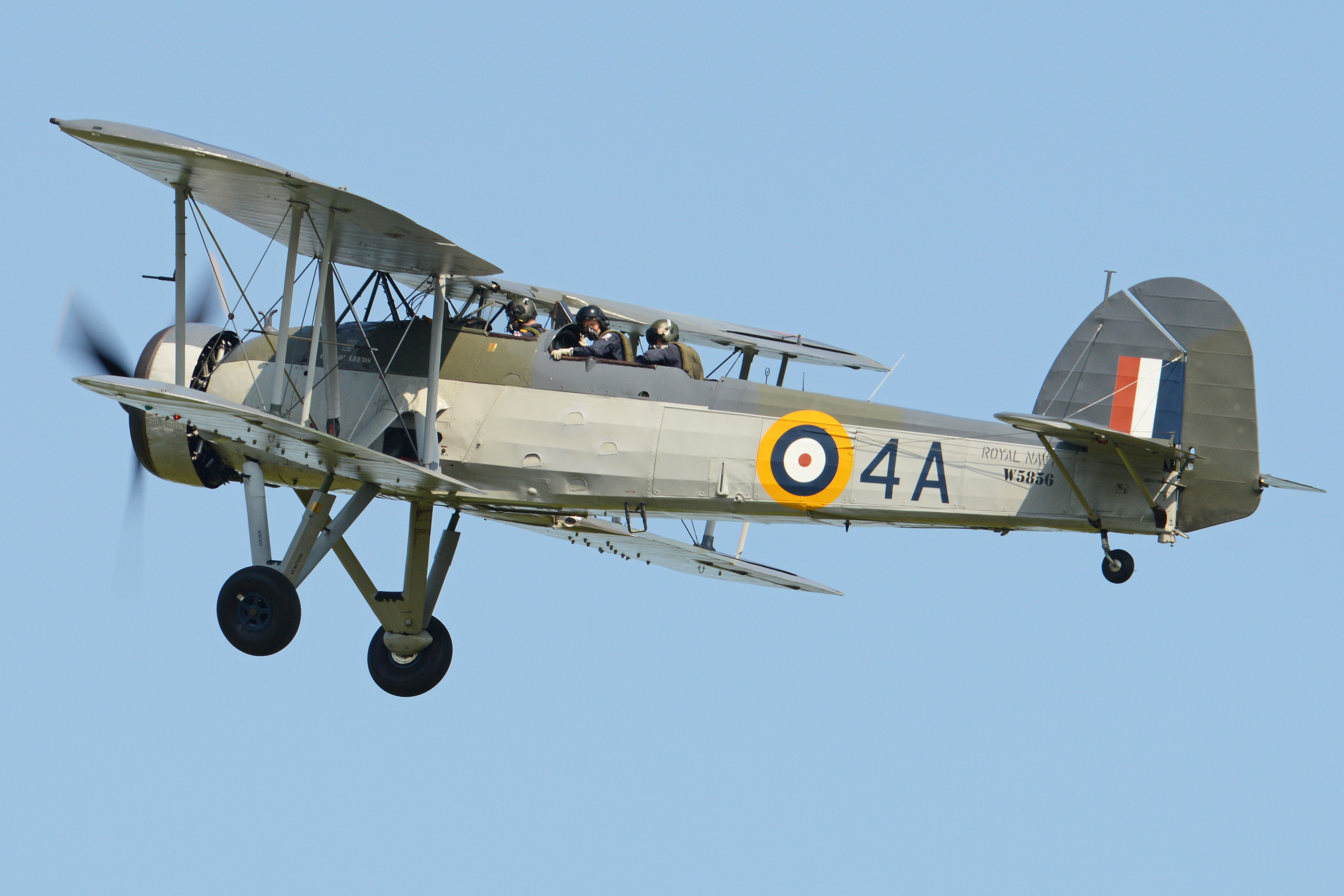
Fairey Swordfish; an example of the type used by 842 NAS

In April, the squadron relocated to Scotland for work-up. On 1 April, they arrived at RNAS Machrihanish (HMS Landrail) in Argyll and Bute, and in May, they moved to RNAS Hatston (HMS Sparrowhawk) on Mainland, Orkney. During this period, they also received an additional three Fairey Swordfish biplanes and a flight of six Supermarine Seafire L Mk.IIc fighter aircraft from 895 Naval Air Squadron. The L Mk.IIc Seafire aircraft were quickly reassigned to 897 Naval Air Squadron and they were substituted by six Supermarine Seafire Mk.Ib fighter aircraft.

In August, the squadron boarded the Attacker-class escort carrier, HMS Fencer and offered anti-submarine protection during the occupation of the Azores from October to November 1943. Starting on 19 November, 'A' Flight of 1832 Naval Air Squadron was assigned to the unit, with its Grumman Wildcat Mk V fighter aircraft functioning as 'Q' Flight. For a period, the squadron operated three distinct types of aircraft.

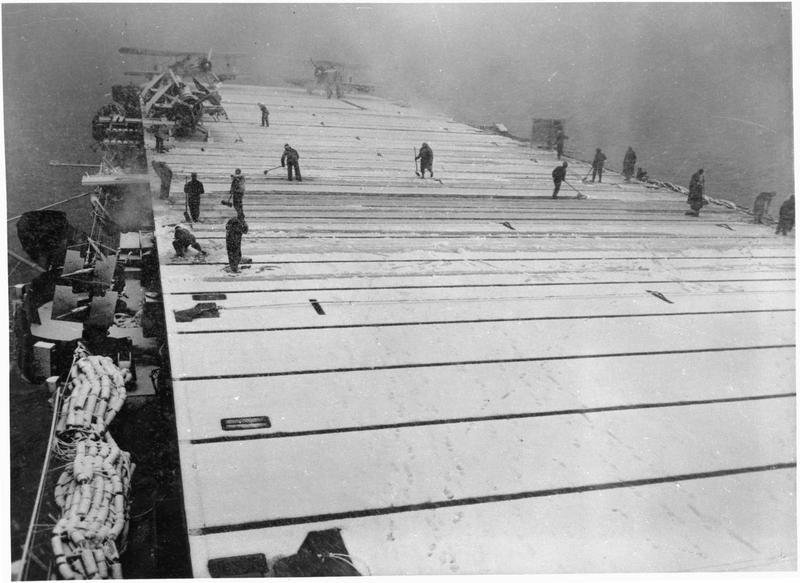
Continual sweeping of the snow-covered flight deck on board HMS Fencer during convoys to Russia. Two Fairey Swordfish aircraft of 842 NAS at the far end of the flight deck.

On 1 December one of the Grumman Wildcat aircraft successfully downed an enemy aircraft while the ship was providing escort for a convoy to Gibraltar. Subsequently, on 10 February 1944, a squadron aircraft managed to sink German submarine U-666 in the Atlantic, west of Ireland. In March, the Supermarine Seafires were substituted with an additional four Grumman Wildcat fighter aircraft from 'E' Flight of 1832 Naval Air Squadron, and in April, the number of Fairey Swordfish was augmented to twelve.

HMS Fencer served as an escort for an Arctic convoy, during which it engaged eleven German U-boats, successfully sinking three: U-277 on 1 May, followed by U-674 and U-959 the following day. In July 1944, the squadron was reorganised, with six Fairey Swordfish aircraft assigned to Implacable-class aircraft carrier, HMS Indefatigable and three to the modified Courageous-class battlecruiser to aircraft carrier, HMS Furious. These aircraft launched attacks on the German battleship Tirpitz, while the remaining Fairey Swordfish and Grumman Wildcat aircraft stayed with HMS Fencer to escort a convoy to Gibraltar. The Grumman Wildcat fighters, reduced to four, remained with the carrier until their transfer to the Nairana-class escort carrier, HMS Campania in October 1944. Meanwhile, the Fairey Swordfish were consolidated under RAF Coastal Command in September 1944 for operations in Scotland.

The remaining Grumman Wildcat aircraft were assigned to 813 Naval Air Squadron upon their arrival in November, just prior to the Fairey Swordfish relocating south to carry on operations from RAF Thorney Island, Sussex, where it was disbanded on 15 January 1945.

== Aircraft operated ==
The squadron has operated a number of different aircraft types, including:

- Fairey Swordfish II torpedo bomber (March 1943 - January 1945)
- Supermarine Seafire L Mk.IIc fighter aircraft (July 1943)
- Supermarine Seafire Mk.Ib fighter aircraft (July 1943 - March 1944)
- Grumman Wildcat Mk V fighter aircraft (November 1943 - October 1944)

== Battle honours ==
The Battle Honours awarded to 842 Naval Air Squadron are:

- Atlantic 1943-44
- Norway 1944
- Arctic 1944.

== Naval air stations ==
842 Naval Air Squadron operated mostly from a number of naval air stations of the Royal Navy and Royal Air Force stations in the UK and both a Royal Navy fleet carrier and an escort carrier:

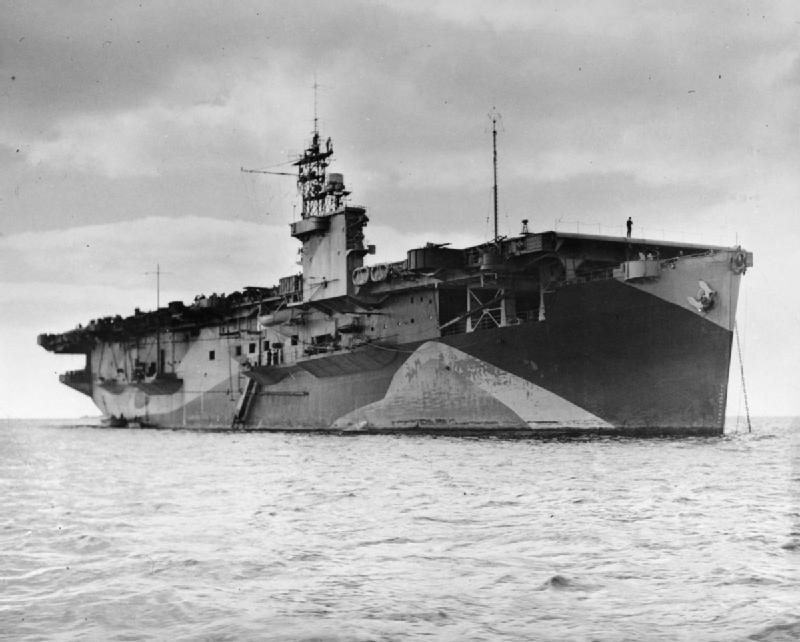
HMS Fencer

- Royal Naval Air Station Lee-on-Solent (HMS Daedalus), Hampshire, (1 March - 1 April 1943)
- Royal Naval Air Station Machrihanish (HMS Landrail), Argyll and Bute, (1 April - 3 May 1943)
- Royal Naval Air Station Hatston (HMS Sparrowhawk), Mainland, Orkney, (3 May - 27 June 1943)
- Royal Naval Air Station Machrihanish (HMS Landrail), Argyll and Bute, (27 June - 18 July 1943)
- Royal Naval Air Station Maydown, County Londonderry, (18 - 30 July 1943)
- Royal Naval Air Station Machrihanish (HMS Landrail), Argyll and Bute, (30 - 31 July 1943)
- Royal Naval Air Station Belfast (HMS Gadwall), County Antrim, (31 July - 5 August 1943)
- HMS Fencer (5 August - 11 October 1943)
- Royal Air Force Lagens, Terceira Island, Azores, (11 - 24 October 1943)
- HMS Fencer (24 October 1943 - 6 April 1944)
- Royal Naval Air Station Grimsetter (HMS Robin), Mainland, Orkney, (6 - 11 April 1944)
- Royal Naval Air Station Hatston (HMS Sparrowhawk), Mainland, Orkney, (11 - 18 April 1944)
- HMS Fencer (18 April - 7 May 1944)
- Royal Naval Air Station Machrihanish (HMS Landrail), Argyll and Bute, (7 May - 10 June 1944)
- HMS Fencer (10 - 30 June 1944)
  - Royal Naval Air Station Grimsetter (HMS Robin), Mainland, Orkney, (Detachment 26 - 30 June 1944)
- Royal Naval Air Station Grimsetter (HMS Robin), Mainland, Orkney, (30 June - 19 July 1944)
  - HMS Fencer (Detachment six aircraft 5 July - 10 August 1944)
  - HMS Furious (Detachment three aircraft 5 - 19 July 1944)
  - HMS Indefatigable (Detachment six aircraft 6 - 19 July 44)
- Royal Naval Air Station Hatston (HMS Sparrowhawk), Mainland, Orkney, (19 July - 8 August 1944)
- Royal Air Force Benbecula, Benbecula, Outer Hebrides, (8 - 16 August 1944)
- HMS Fencer (16 - 22 August 1944)
- Royal Air Force Stornoway, Isle of Lewis, Outer Hebrides, (22 August - 10 September 1944)
- Royal Air Force Benbecula, Benbecula, Outer Hebrides, (10 September - 8 November 1944)
  - Royal Air Force Mullaghmore, County Antrim, (Detachment six 1 - 2 November 1944)
- Royal Naval Air Station Machrihanish (HMS Landrail), Argyll and Bute, (8 - 10 November 1944)
- Royal Air Force Thorney Island, West Sussex, (10 November 1944 - 15 January 1945)
- Royal Naval Air Station Burscough (HMS Ringtail), Lancashire, (aircraft) (15 January 1945)
- disbanded - (15 January 1945)

=== 'Q' Flight (Wildcat) ===
- Royal Naval Air Station Machrihanish (HMS Landrail), Argyll and Bute, (19 - 20 November 1943)
- HMS Fencer (20 November 1943 - 22 March 1944)
- Royal Naval Air Station Hatston (HMS Sparrowhawk), Mainland, Orkney, (22 - 27 March 1944)
- HMS Fencer (27 March - 11 April 1944)
- Royal Naval Air Station Hatston (HMS Sparrowhawk), Mainland, Orkney, (11 - 18 April 1944)
- HMS Fencer (18 April - 7 May 1944)
- Royal Naval Air Station Machrihanish (HMS Landrail), Mainland, Orkney, (7 May - 10 June 1944)
- HMS Fencer (10 - 26 June 1944)
- Royal Naval Air Station Grimsetter (HMS Robin), Mainland, Orkney, (26 June - 5 July 1944)
- HMS Fencer (5 July - 10 August 1944)
- Royal Naval Air Station Hatston (HMS Sparrowhawk), Mainland, Orkney, (10 August - 19 October 1944
  - HMS Furious (Detachment two aircraft 14 - 28 August 1944)
  - HMS Fencer (Detachment four aircraft 27 September - 19 October 1944)
  - HMS Campania (Detachment four aircraft 27 September - 19 October 1944)
- Royal Naval Air Station Hatston (HMS Sparrowhawk), Mainland, Orkney, (19 - 28 October 1944)
- disbanded - (28 October 1944)

== Commanding officers ==
List of commanding officers of 842 Naval Air Squadron with date of appointment:

- Lieutenant Commander(A) C.B. Lamb, DSO, DSC,RN, from 1 March 1943
- Lieutenant Commander(A) L.R. Tivy, RN, from 21 April 1943
- Lieutenant Commander(A) G.F.S. Hodson, RNR, from 27 March 1944
- Lieutenant Commander(A) L.A. Edwards, RN from 2 August 1944
- disbanded - 15 January 1945

== See also ==
- Allied order of battle for Operation Tungsten
- Allied order of battle for Operation Mascot
