= Allied order of battle for Operation Tungsten =

Tirpitz in Bogen Bay in Ofotfjord, near Narvik

Operation Tungsten was a Second World War air raid conducted by the Royal Navy that targeted the German battleship Tirpitz at her base in Kaafjord in the far north of Norway on 3 April 1944.

The damage inflicted during the attack was not sufficient to sink or disable the ship, but she suffered considerable damage to her superstructure and unarmored areas, with 122 members of her crew killed and 316 were wounded. Tirpitz was eventually disabled and then sunk by Royal Air Force heavy bombers later in the year.

== Home Fleet forces dispatched ==
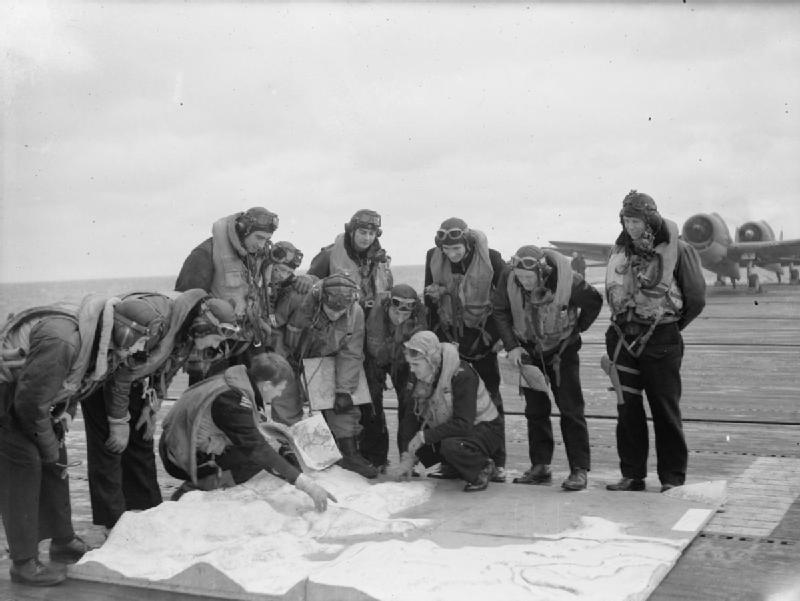
Hellcat pilots assigned to 800 Naval Air Squadron studying a model of Tirpitz's anchorage ahead of the Operation Tungsten attack

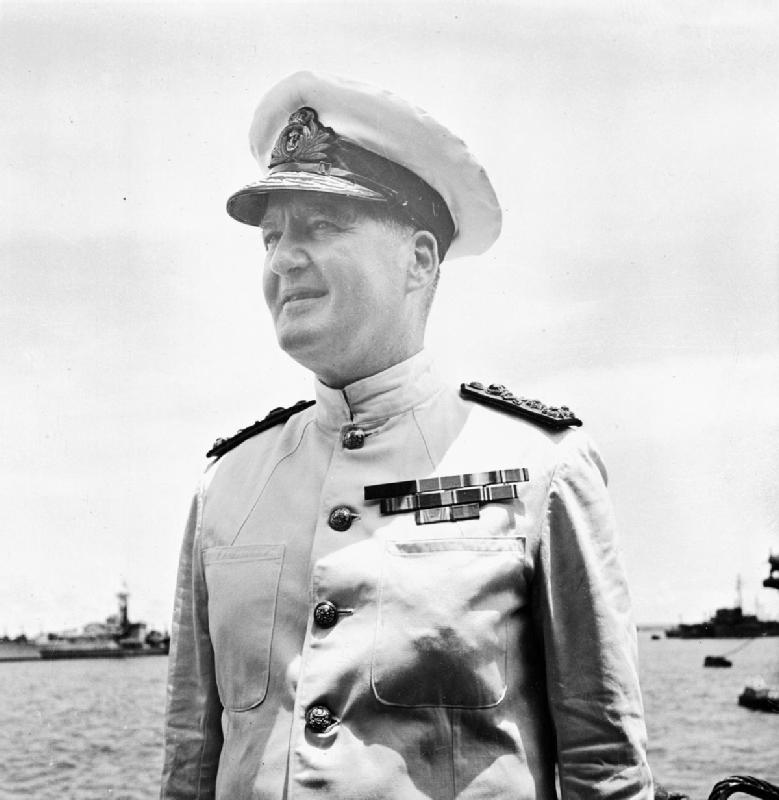
Vice-Adm Bruce Fraser

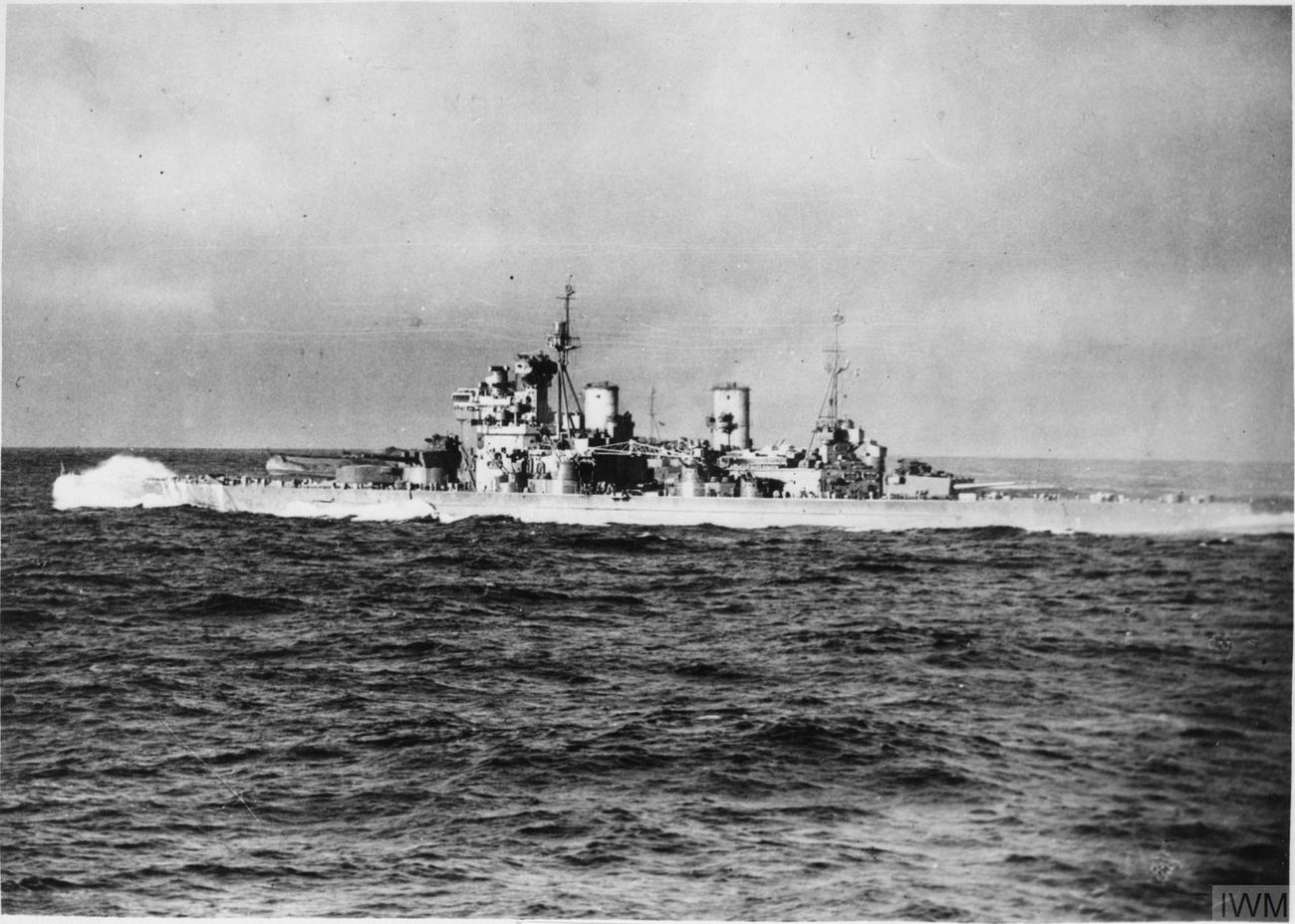
HMS Duke of York, Vice-Adm Fraser's flagship

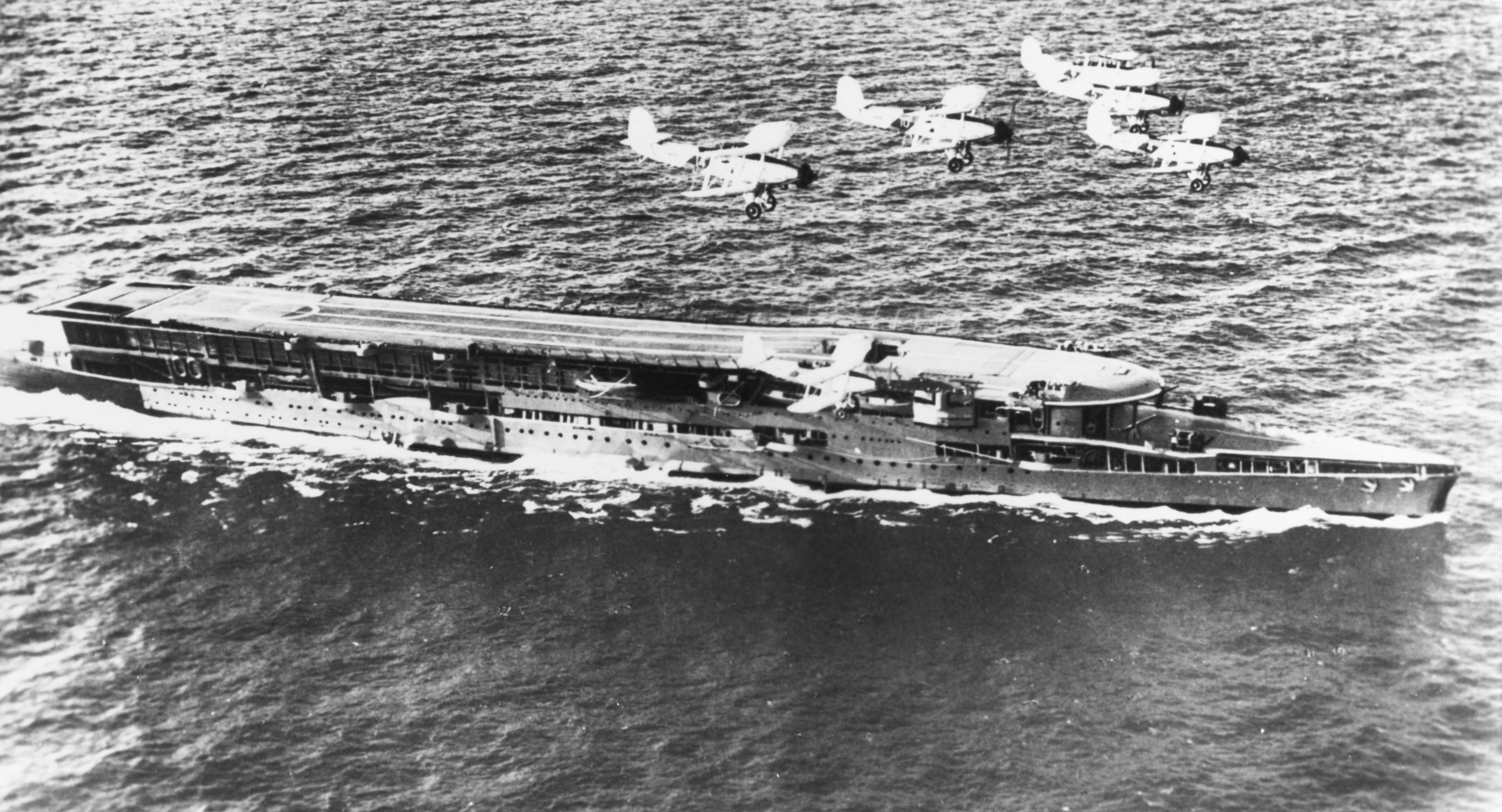
HMS Furious before the war

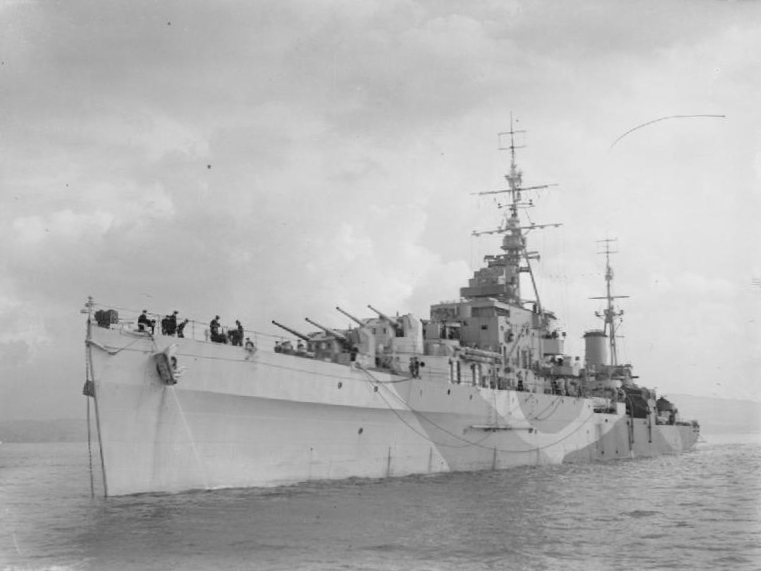
HMS Royalist at anchor in Scotland

The Home Fleet had responsibility for conducting the attack. The ships involved sailed from the Home Fleet's base at Scapa Flow in two groups on 30 March 1944.

=== Force One ===
Vice-Admiral Bruce Fraser

HMS Victorious

827 Naval Air Squadron (12 Fairey Barracudas)
829 Naval Air Squadron (9 Barracudas)
1834 Naval Air Squadron (14 Vought F4U Corsairs)
1836 Naval Air Squadron (14 Corsairs)

2 King George V-class battleships (10 × 14-inch main btty, 28 kn)

HMS Duke of York (flagship of Admiral Bruce Fraser)
HMS Anson (flagship of Vice-Admiral Henry Moore)

1 Town-class light cruiser (12 × 6-inch main btty, 32 kn)

HMS Belfast

6 destroyers

4 M-class: HMS Marne, HMS Matchless, HMS Meteor, HMS Milne
2 U-class: HMS Ursa, HMS Undaunted

=== Force Two ===
Rear-Admiral Arthur William La Touche Bisset

HMS Furious

801 Naval Air Squadron (9 Supermarine Seafires)
880 Naval Air Squadron (9 Seafires)
830 Naval Air Squadron (9 Barracudas)
831 Naval Air Squadron (12 Barracudas)

HMS Emperor

800 Naval Air Squadron (10 Grumman F6F Hellcats)
804 Naval Air Squadron (10 Hellcats)

HMS Fencer

842 Naval Air Squadron (12 Fairey Swordfish and 8 Grumman F4F Wildcats)

HMS Pursuer

881 Naval Air Squadron (10 Wildcats)
896 Naval Air Squadron (10 Wildcats)

HMS Searcher

882 Naval Air Squadron (10 Wildcats)
898 Naval Air Squadron (10 Wildcats)

3 light cruisers

1 Dido-class (8 × 5.25-inch main btty, 32.25 kn): HMS Royalist (flagship of Rear-Adm. Bisset)
1 Fiji-class (12 × 6-inch main btty, 31.25 kn): HMS Jamaica
1 Southampton-class (12 × 6-inch main btty, 32 kn): HMS Sheffield

9 destroyers

5 V-class: HMS Virago, HMS Verulam, HMS Vigilant, HMCS Algonquin, HMCS Sioux
1 W-class: HMS Wakeful
1 S-class: HMS Swift
1 O-class: HMS Onslaught
1 N-class: ORP Piorun
1 J-class: HMS Javelin

2 fleet support tankers

RFA Blue Ranger, RFA Brown Ranger

== Composition of strike forces ==
On 1 April Admiral Fraser decided to conduct the strike on 3 April rather than 4 April as originally planned. This led to the following organisational changes:

- HMS Duke of York escorted by HMS Matchless and Marne detached from Force One and cruised to the west
- The remainder of Force One sailed to join Force Two, with the two forces combining on the afternoon of 2 April
- The Royal Fleet Auxiliary tankers Blue Ranger and Brown Ranger, escorted by the destroyers HMS Javelin and ORP Piorun, were detached from Force Two on 1 April

The attack on Tirpitz and the anti-aircraft batteries and ships located near her mooring at Kaafjord on 3 April involved two strike forces:

1st strike

- No. 8 Torpedo Bomber Reconnaissance Wing
  - 827 Naval Air Squadron
  - 830 Naval Air Squadron
- Fighter escorts
  - Elements, 1834 and 1836 Naval Air Squadrons
  - 800 Naval Air Squadron
  - 881 Naval Air Squadron
  - 882 Naval Air Squadron

2nd strike

- No. 52 Torpedo Bomber Reconnaissance Wing
  - 829 Naval Air Squadron
  - 831 Naval Air Squadron
- Fighter escorts
  - Elements, 1834 and 1836 Naval Air Squadrons
  - 804 Naval Air Squadron
  - 896 Naval Air Squadron
  - 898 Naval Air Squadron

== Bibliography ==
- Brown, J. D. (1968). Carrier Operations in World War II: The Royal Navy. Vol. I. Shepperton: Ian Allan. OCLC 59987056.
- Brown, David (1977). Tirpitz: The Floating Fortress. London: Arms and Armour Press. ISBN 978-0-85-368341-4.
- Bennett, G. H., ed. (2012) [1944]. "Naval Aircraft Attack on the Tirpitz (Operation 'Tungsten') 3 April 1944". Hunting Tirpitz: Naval Operations Against Bismarck's Sister Ship. Battle summary (No. 27) (repr. University of Plymouth Press, Plymouth ed.). London: Tactical, Torpedo and Staff Duties Division, Historical Section, Naval Staff, Admiralty. pp. 133–177. ISBN 978-1-84-102310-6.
- Tillman, Barrett (1996). Hellcat Aces of World War 2. London: Osprey Aerospace. ISBN 978-1-85-532596-8.
