= 1832 Naval Air Squadron =

Inactive Royal Navy Fleet Air Arm and Reserve Air Squadron

- Squadron badge
- Active: 1943–1944; 1947–1957; 1980
- Disbanded: 1980
- Country: United Kingdom
- Branch: Royal Navy
- Type: Single-seat fighter squadron; Royal Naval Volunteer Reserve air squadron; Royal Naval Reserve air squadron
- Role: Carrier-based fighter squadron
- Part of: Fleet Air Arm
- Home station: See Naval air stations section for full list.
- Mottos: Robur in pace (Latin for 'Strong in peace')
- Aircraft: See Aircraft flown section for full list.
- Battle honours: Norway 1944; Atlantic 1944; Arctic 1944

Insignia
- Squadron Badge Description: Barry wavy of six white and blue, a sword red surmounted by a dove volant white holding in its beak a sprig of olive proper (1949)
- Identification Markings: single letters (Wildcat); 101-134 (Seafire); 201-206, later 276-279 (Harvard); 151-160 (Sea Fury FB.11); 101+ (Sea Fury FB.11 July 1953); 100-203 (Sea Fury T.20); 272-273 (Sea Fury T.20 July 1953); 851-852 (Sea Fury T.20, later); 101-108 (Attacker); 820-834 (Attacker January 1956); 275-276 (Sea Balliol); 820-824, 845-852 (Sea Hawk); 278-279 (Sea Vampire); 853-854 (Sea Vampire January 1956)
- Fin Shore Code: CH (Seafire, Harvard, Sea Fury FB.11/T.20)

1832 Naval Air Squadron (1832 NAS) was a Fleet Air Arm (FAA) naval air squadron of the United Kingdom's Royal Navy (RN). Established in August 1943, at HMS Gannet, RNAS Eglinton, Northern Ireland, with a complement of ten Grumman Wildcat Mk V fighter aircraft, the squadron initially relocated to RAF Speke, near Liverpool, in September. Its primary mission was to develop four fighter flights that could be integrated into TBR squadrons operating from escort carriers. The squadron subsequently moved to HMS Blackcap, RNAS Stretton, in Cheshire, in December and returned to RNAS Eglinton in February 1944, where it integrated the remaining aircraft and personnel from 878 Naval Air Squadron before officially disbanding in June 1944.

It was re-established as a fighter squadron within the Royal Naval Volunteer Reserve Air Branch, subsequently becoming part of the Southern Air Division, from 1947 until its disbandment in 1957. In 1980, it was reconstituted as a Royal Naval Reserve squadron; however, the initial concept quickly became obsolete due to its incompatibility with the requirements of the contemporary Fleet Air Arm.

== History ==
=== Single-seat fighter squadron (1943-1944) ===
1832 Naval Air Squadron was established at HMS Gannet, the Royal Naval Air Station at Eglinton, County Londonderry in Northern Ireland, on 15 August 1943. It was organised as a single-seat fighter squadron, led by Lieutenant Commander(A) T. W. Harrington, of the Royal Navy. The squadron's initial fleet consisted of ten Grumman Martlet Mk V fighter aircraft. Beginning in January 1944, the designation was altered to Wildcat to align with the naming conventions of the US Navy. The Mk V served as the Fleet Air Arm's counterpart to the US Navy's FM-1, manufactured by the Eastern Aircraft Division of General Motors Corporation and equipped with a Pratt & Whitney R-1830 Twin Wasp engine.

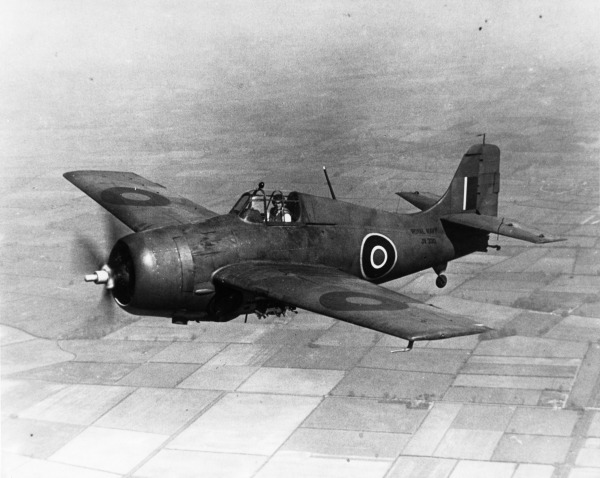
A Fleet Air Arm Grumman (Eastern) FM-1 Martlet Mk V

The squadron was assigned the responsibility of organising fighter flights, each consisting of four aircraft, to be attached to Torpedo Bomber Reconnaissance (TBR) squadrons operating from escort carriers. Ultimately, ten flights were established. On 20 September, it relocated to RAF Speke, Liverpool, to commence training and the formation of these flights. 'A' Flight was established at RNAS Maydown, County Londonderry, on 6 November 1943. On the 20 of the same month, it boarded the Attacker-class, escort carrier, HMS Fencer, to serve as the fighter component of 842 Naval Air Squadron. Subsequently, on 17 March 1945, they were joined by 'E' Flight. The fighter flights were later integrated into 842 Naval Air Squadron. A trend became apparent as the flights were integrated into the TBR squadrons to which they were affiliated.

On 9 December 1943, the squadron moved to RNAS Stretton (HMS Blackap), Cheshire, where 'C' Flight was established and subsequently joined 832 Naval Air Squadron. Additionally, 'B' Flight was created on 20 December 1943, and was assigned to 846 Naval Air Squadron to serve aboard the Attacker-class escort carrier, HMS Tracker. On 2 February 1944, 1832 Naval Air Squadron re-established its presence at RNAS Eglinton (HMS Gannet), where it integrated elements of 878 Naval Air Squadron, which was a Grumman Wildcat unit that had been disbanded at that location in late January.

On the 3 February, the formations of flights 'D', 'E', 'F', and 'G' took place. 'D' Flight was designated to join 845 Naval Air Squadron, while 'E' Flight integrated with 'A' flight in HMS Fencer on 17 March. 'F' Flight was assigned to 813 Naval Air Squadron, which was operating from the Nairana-class escort carrier, HMS Campania starting 5 April and 'G' flight was attached to 852 Naval Air Squadron for service in the Ruler-class escort carrier, HMS Nabob. 'H', 'I' and 'J' Flights were established on 26 March but remained stationed at RNAS Eglinton. The last flight to be created was 'L', which was formed on 13 May 1944 to join 'B' Flight associated with 846 Naval Air Squadron in preparation for re-joining HMS Tracker on 3 June.

The squadron was officially disbanded at RNAS Eglinton on 1 June 1944, with all remaining detached sub-flights integrated into their respective squadrons. In November 1945, there were proposals to re-equip 1832 Naval Air Squadron with fifteen Vought Corsair aircraft as part of the 5th Carrier Air Group, which was to have included 1832 and 1838 Naval Air Squadrons, also with Vought Corsair, along with 852 Naval Air Squadron with Grumman Avenger, utilising a spare Illustrious-class aircraft carrier. However, these plans were ultimately abandoned following V-J Day.

== Royal Naval Volunteer Reserve Air Squadron ==
=== Fighter squadron (1947-1957) ===
1832 Naval Air Squadron was officially re-established at RNAS Culham (HMS Hornbill), Oxfordshire, on 1 July 1947, functioning as a Royal Naval Volunteer Reserve (RNVR) Fighter squadron, under the command of Lieutenant Commander(A) P. Godfrey, OBE, RNVR.

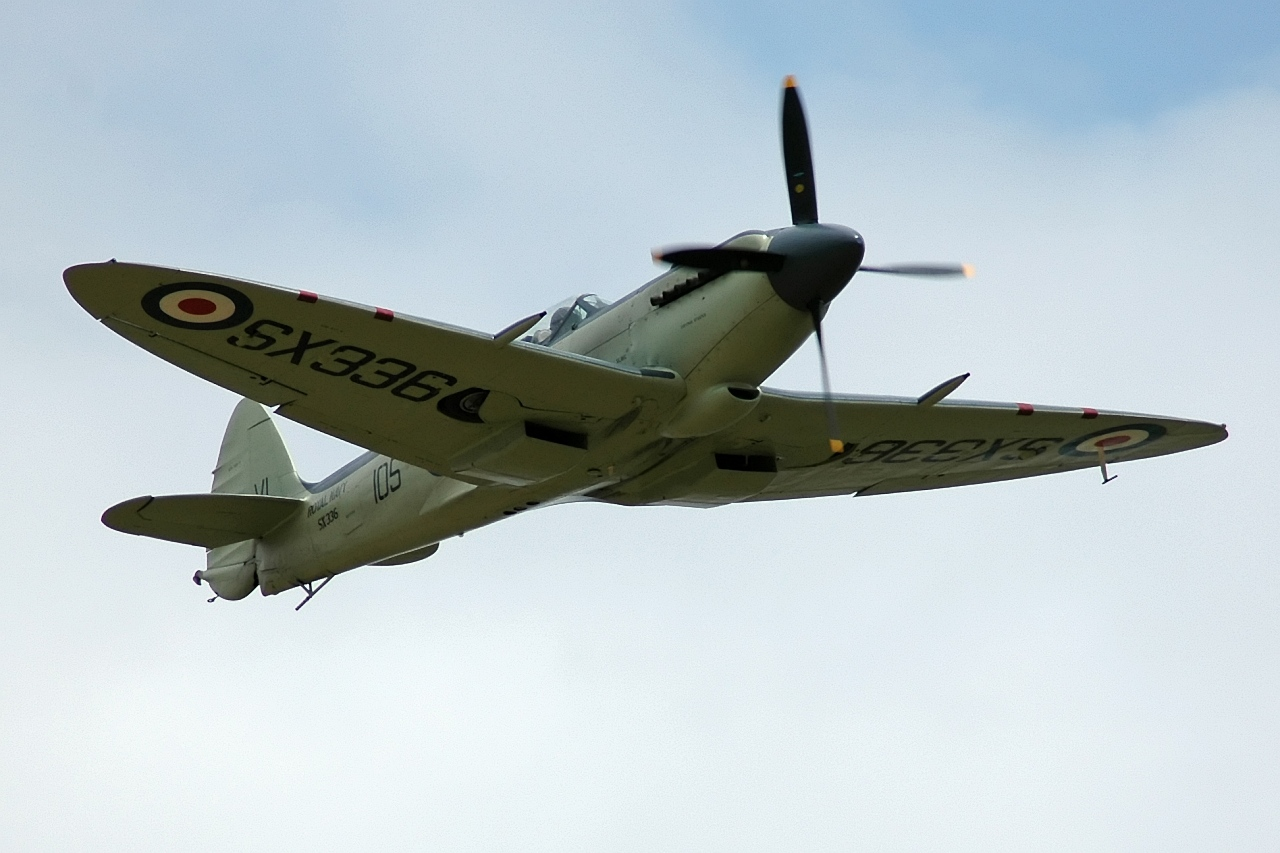
Supermarine Seafire F Mk.17; an example of the type used by 1832 (RNVR) NAS

Initially, the unit was equipped by with four Supermarine Seafire F Mk.III fighter aircraft, which were subsequently replaced by six Supermarine Seafire F Mk.46s and FR Mk.46, along with several F Mk.17, starting in June 1948. By April 1949, Supermarine Seafire F Mk.15 began to take the place of the F Mk.46, and by January 1950, the unit's composition included fourteen Supermarine Seafire F Mk.15 and F Mk.17s. In August 1951, 1832 Naval Air Squadron commenced re-equipping with nine Hawker Sea Fury FB.11 fighter-bomber aircraft.

Flight operations were conducted at RNAS Culham on weekends. Pilots and Observers were mandated to complete fourteen days of continuous training annually, alongside one-hundred hours of non-continuous training (drills), and to serve on squadron duty for twelve weekends. Throughout this period, they were anticipated to accumulate a minimum of seventy-five flying hours and a maximum of one-hundred and twenty-five flying hours.

On 1 June 1952, the Southern Air Division was established to oversee 1832 Naval Air Squadron along with its two subsidiary's, 1832A and 1832B Naval Air Squadrons, which were created on 1 October 1952. In April 1953, these squadrons were re-designated as 1836 and 1835 Naval Air Squadrons, respectively.

The three squadrons utilised their aircraft collectively. In August 1955, 1832 Naval Air Squadron transitioned to eight Supermarine Attacker FB.2 jet aircraft, while the other two squadrons continued to operate the Hawker Sea Fury aircraft. By April 1956, the squadrons returned to a pooled operation, now comprising eight Supermarine Attackers, two de Havilland Sea Vampire T.22 jet trainer aircraft, two Hawker Sea Hawk F.1 jet fighter aircraft, and two Hawker Sea Fury T.20 two-seat trainer aircraft. By the end of that year, the Supermarine Attacker had been phased out, leaving the squadrons with two de Havilland Sea Vampire and thirteen Hawker Sea Hawk jet aircraft.

As a result of reductions in defense spending, the Royal Naval Volunteer Reserve Air Branch was disbanded in 1957, leading to the dissolution of the organisation and its squadrons on 10 March 1957.

== Royal Naval Reserve Air Squadron ==
On 3 April 1980, 1832 Naval Air Squadron was re-established at RNAS Yeovilton (HMS Heron), Somerset, as a Royal Naval Reserve (RNR) unit. It was tasked with providing annual training for former helicopter aircrew officers who had retired from the Royal Navy within the last three years prior to their enlistment in the RNR Air Branch.

No commanding officers or engineering officers were designated; instead, these were essentially 'virtual' squadrons established to oversee the training of Royal Naval Reserve Air Branch officer aircrew. The training obligations were to be fulfilled using aircraft from the current Royal Navy air squadrons. However, this approach was soon abandoned, and members of the RNR Air Branch began to be assigned to any squadron that operated the aircraft type for which they were certified during their two weeks of annual training.

== Aircraft flown ==
1832 Naval Air Squadron flew different variants of only one aircraft type during the Second World War, but many different types as a RNVR squadron:

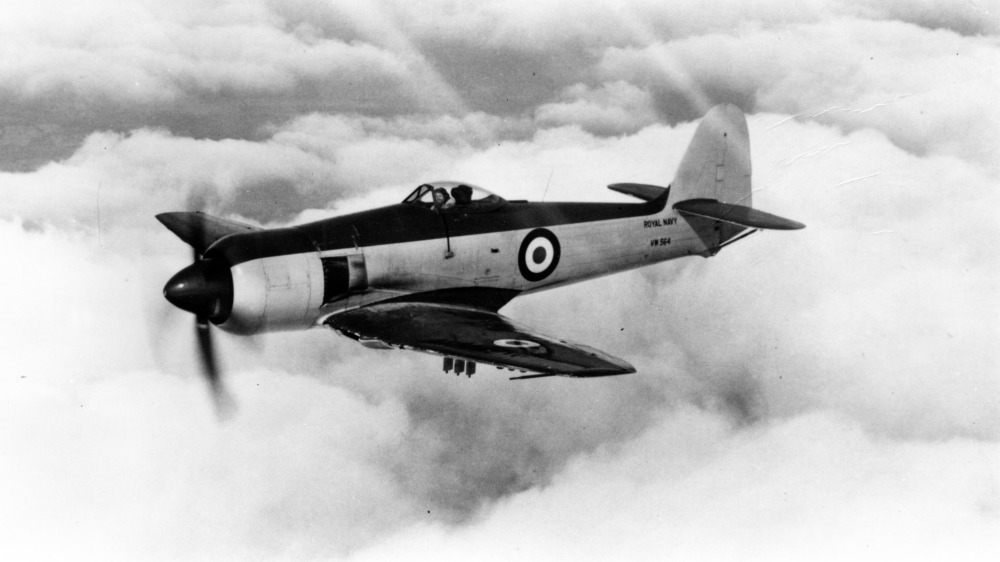
Hawker Sea Fury Hawker Sea Fury FB.11

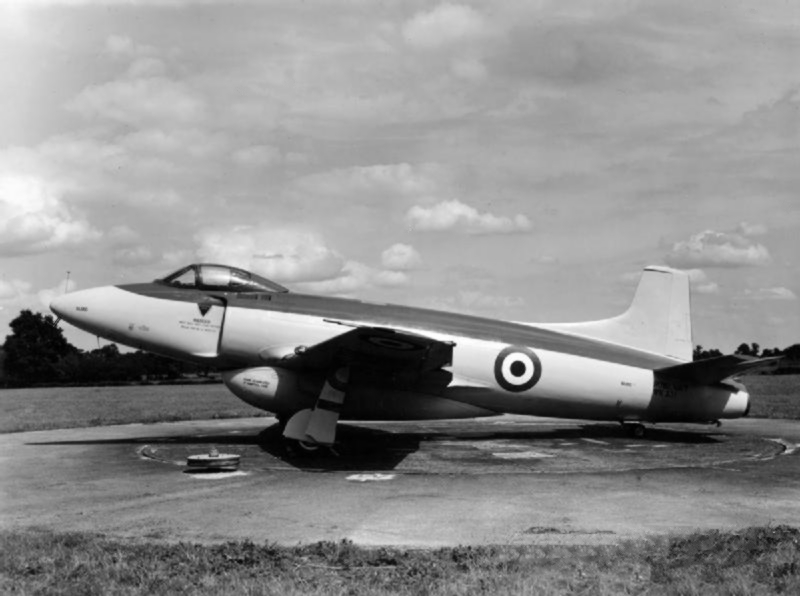
Supermarine Attacker FB.2

- Grumman Martlet Mk I fighter aircraft (August - December 1943)
- Grumman Martlet Mk II fighter aircraft (August - December 1943)
- Grumman Martlet Mk IV fighter aircraft (August - December 1943)
- Grumman Wildcat Mk V fighter aircraft (August 1943 - June 1944)
- Supermarine Seafire F Mk.III fighter aircraft (July - November 1947)
- North American Harvard IIB advanced trainer aircraft (July 1947 - April 1955)
- Supermarine Seafire F Mk.46 fighter aircraft (August 1947 - January 1950)
- Supermarine Seafire FR Mk.46 fighter/reconnaissance aircraft (August 1947 - January 1950)
- North American Harvard III advanced trainer aircraft (January 1948 - February 1951)
- Supermarine Seafire F Mk.17 fighter aircraft (June 1948 - May 1953)
- Avro Anson Mk I multirole training aircraft (January 1949 - March 1950)
- Supermarine Seafire F Mk.15 fighter aircraft (April 1949 - August 1951)
- Taylorcraft Auster V liaison and observation aircraft (January 1950 - July 1952)
- Hawker Sea Fury T.20 two-seat trainer aircraft (October 1950 - June 1956)
- Hawker Sea Fury FB.11 fighter-bomber (August 1951 - August 1955)
- de Havilland Dominie short-haul airliner (July 1953 - November 1955)
- de Havilland Sea Vampire T.22 jet trainer aircraft (July 1955 - January 1957)
- Supermarine Attacker FB.2 jet fighter-bomber (August 1955 - November 1956)
- Hawker Sea Hawk F.1 jet fighter aircraft (January 1956 - January 1957)

== Battle honours ==
The battle honours awarded to 1832 Naval Air Squadron are:

- Norway 1944
- Atlantic 1944
- Arctic 1944.

== Naval air stations ==
1832 Naval Air Squadron operated mostly from a number of naval air stations of the Royal Navy and a Royal Air Force Station in the UK and operated flights from a number of Royal Navy escort carriers:

1943 - 1944

- Royal Naval Air Station Eglinton (HMS Gannet), County Londonderry, (15 August - 20 September 1943)
- Royal Air Force Speke, Liverpool, (20 September - 9 December 1943)
- Royal Naval Air Station Stretton (HMS Blackcap), Cheshire, (9 December 1943 - 2 February 1944)
- Royal Naval Air Station Eglinton (HMS Gannet), County Londonderry, (2 February - 1 June 1944)
- disbanded - (1 June 1944)

A total of eleven flights were formed, with each flight comprising four aircraft designated for Torpedo Bomber Reconnaissance (TBR) squadrons that operated from escort carriers. The sub-flights that were detached were incorporated into their corresponding squadrons.

'A' Flight:

- Royal Naval Air Station Maydown, County Londonderry, (6 - 15 November 191.43)
- HMS Argus (Deck Landing Training (DLT) 15 - 19 November 1943)
- Royal Naval Air Station Machrihanish (HMS Landrail), Argyll and Bute, (19 - 20 November 1943)
- HMS Fencer to 842 Naval Air Squadron (20 November 1943)

'B' Flight:

- Royal Naval Air Station Machrihanish (HMS Landrail), Argyll and Bute, (20 - 30 December 1943)
- HMS Tracker to 846 Naval Air Squadron (31 December 1943)

'C' Flight:

- Royal Naval Air Station Stretton (HMS Blackcap), Cheshire, (9 December 1943 - 30 January 1944)
- Royal Naval Air Station Machrihanish (HMS Landrail), Argyll and Bute, (30 January - 2 February 1944)
- HMS Slinger to 832 Naval Air Squadron (2 February 1944)

'D' Flight:

- Royal Naval Air Station Eglinton (HMS Gannet), County Londonderry, (3 - 18 February 1944)
- HMS Engadine for 845 Naval Air Squadron (18 February 1944)

'E' Flight:

- Royal Naval Air Station Eglinton (HMS Gannet), County Londonderry, (3 February - 17 March 1944)
- HMS Fencer to 842 Naval Air Squadron (17 March 1944)

'F' Flight:

- Royal Naval Air Station Eglinton (HMS Gannet), County Londonderry, (3 February - 5 April 1944)
- HMS Campania to 813 Naval Air Squadron (5 April 1944)

'G' Flight:

- Royal Naval Air Station Eglinton (HMS Gannet), County Londonderry, (3 February - 20 May 1944)
- Royal Naval Air Station Machrihanish (HMS Landrail), Argyll and Bute, (20 May - 1 June 1944)
- HMS Nabob to 852 Naval Air Squadron (1 June 1944)

'H' Flight:

- Royal Naval Air Station Eglinton (HMS Gannet), County Londonderry, (26 March 1944, to 853 Naval Air Squadron, May 1944)

'I' Flight:

- Royal Naval Air Station Eglinton (HMS Gannet), County Londonderry, (26 March 1944, to 850 Naval Air Squadron, 30 July 1944)

'J' Flight:

- Royal Naval Air Force Eglinton (HMS Gannet), County Londonderry, (16 March - 13 May 1944)
- Royal Naval Air Station Machrihanish (HMS Landrail), Argyll and Bute, (26 June 1944, to 852 Naval Air Squadron, 29 June 1944)

'L' Flight:

- Royal Naval Air Station Machrihanish (HMS Landrail), Argyll and Bute, (13 May - 3 June 1944)
- HMS Tracker to 846 Naval Air Squadron (3 June 1944)

1947 - 1957

- Royal Naval Air Station Culham (HMS Hornbill), Oxfordshire, (1 July 1947 - 18 July 1953)
- Royal Air Force Benson, Oxfordshire, (18 July 1953 - 10 March 1957)
  - Annual training:
    - Royal Naval Air Station Culdrose (HMS Seahawk), Cornwall, (29 May - 12 June 1948)
    - Royal Naval Air Station Culdrose (HMS Seahawk), Cornwall, (19 June - 3 July 1948)
    - HMS Implacable (September - 23 July 1949)
    - HMS Theseus (17 - 30 June 1950)
    - Royal Naval Air Station St Merryn (HMS Vulture), Cornwall, (23 June - 8 July 1951)
    - Royal Naval Air Station Hal Far (HMS Falcon), Malta, (7 - 12 June 1952)
    - Royal Naval Air Station Culdrose (HMS Seahawk), Cornwall, (4 - 18 July 1953)
    - Royal Air Force Schleswigland, Schleswig-Holstein, Germany, (10 - 24 July 1954)
    - Royal Naval Air Station Ford (HMS Peregrine), Sussex / HMS Bulwark (23 June - 7 July 1956)
- disbanded - (10 March 1957)

1980 - 1982

- Royal Naval Air Station Yeovilton (HMS Heron), Somerset, (3 April 1980 - 1 April 1982)
- concept lapsed - (1 April 1982)

=== 1832A Naval Air Squadron ===
- Royal Naval Air Station Culham (HMS Hornbill), Oxfordshire, (1 October 1952 - 28 March 1953)
- became 1835 Naval Air Squadron - (28 March 1953)

=== 1832B Naval Air Squadron ===
- Royal Naval Air Station Culham (HMS Hornbill), Oxfordshire, (1 October 1952 - 28 March 1953)
- became 1836 Naval Air Squadron - (28 March 1953)

== Commanding officers ==
List of commanding officers of 1832 Naval Air Squadron with date of appointment:

Note: Abbreviation (A) signifies Air Branch of the RN or RNVR.

1942 - 1944

- Lieutenant Commander(A) T.W. Harrington, RN, from 15 August 1943
- Lieutenant Commander M. Hordern, RN, from 15 December 1943
- disbanded - 1 June 1944

1947 - 1957

- Lieutenant Commander(A) I.P. Godfrey, OBE, RNVR, from 1 July 1947
- Lieutenant Commander(A) G.McC. Rutherford, MBE, DSC, RNVR, from 7 December 1948
- Lieutenant Commander(A) G.R. Willcocks, DSC, RNVR, from 1 June 1952
- Lieutenant Commander(A) M.R.H. Shippey, RNVR, from 27 November 1953
- Lieutenant Commander(A) T.C. Fletcher, RNVR, from 30 September 1955
- Lieutenant Commander(A) A.J. Austin, RNVR, from 12 July 1956
- disbanded - 10 March 1957

=== 1832A Naval Air Squadron ===
- Lieutenant Commander(A)A.C.B. Ford, DSC, RNVR, from 1 October 1952
- became 1835 Naval Air Squadron - 28 March 1953

=== 1832B Naval Air Squadron ===
- Lieutenant Commander(A)T.O. Adkin, RNVR, from 1 October 1952
- became 1836 Naval Air Squadron - 28 March 1953
