= 739 Naval Air Squadron =

Inactive flying squadron of the Royal Navy's Fleet Air Arm

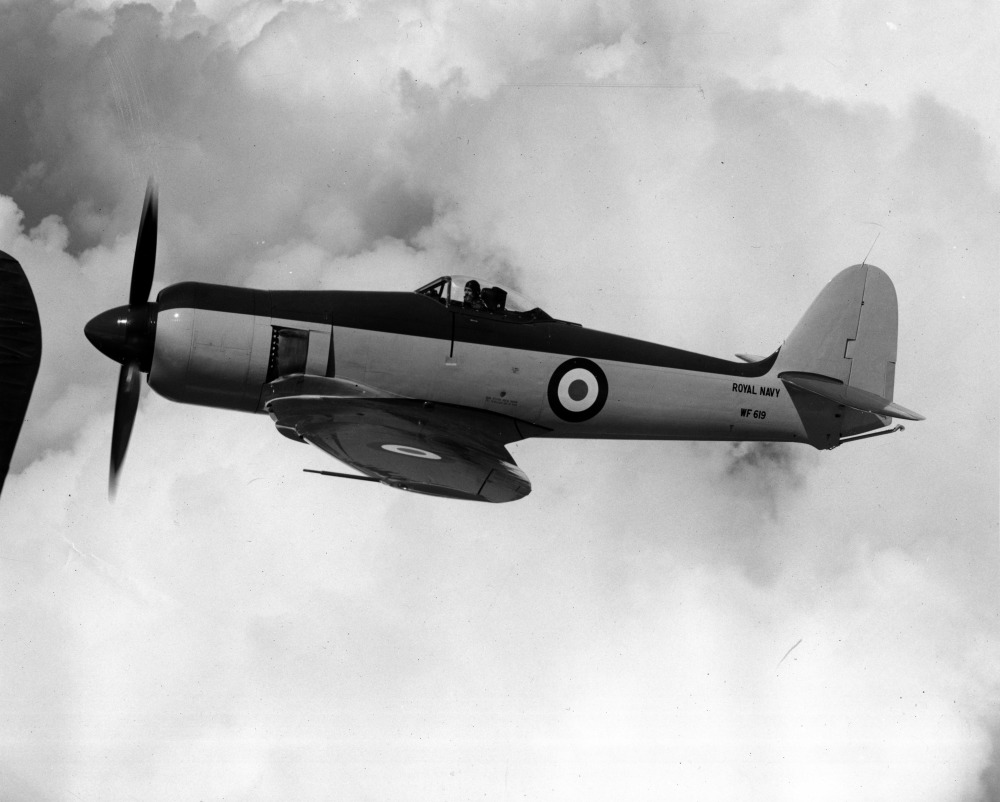
- Hawker Sea Fury FB.11; an example of the type used by 739 NAS
- Active: 1942–1945; 1947–1950
- Disbanded: 12 July 1950
- Country: United Kingdom
- Branch: Royal Navy
- Type: Fleet Air Arm Second Line Squadron
- Role: Blind Approach Development Unit; Photographic Trials and Development Unit
- Size: Squadron
- Part of: Fleet Air Arm
- Home station: See Naval air stations section for full list.
- Aircraft: See Aircraft flown section for full list.

739 Naval Air Squadron (739 NAS), also referred to as 739 Squadron, is an inactive Fleet Air Arm (FAA) naval air squadron of the United Kingdom’s Royal Navy (RN), which last disbanded during 1950. It was operational at RNAS Culham (HMS Hornbill), Oxfordshire, as the Fleet Air Arm Photographic Trials and Development Unit, from 1947. It flew de Havilland Sea Mosquito TR Mk.33, de Havilland Dominie, Hawker Sea Fury and de Havilland Sea Hornet PR.22 and F.20.

It was initially formed as the Blind Approach Development Unit for the Fleet Air Arm, operating with Fairey Fulmar and Fairey Swordfish aircraft, at RNAS Lee-on-Solent (HMS Daedalus), Hampshire, in 1942. Just under one year later the squadron moved to RNAS Worthy Down (HMS Kestrel), Hampshire, in late 1943 and continued in the role. Roughly one year later the squadron moved again, relocating to RNAS Donibristle (HMS Merlin), Fife, in late 1944, before disbanding in 1945.

== History ==
=== Blind Approach Development Unit (1942–1945) ===
739 Naval Air Squadron formed at RNAS Lee-on-Solent (HMS Daedalus), situated near Lee-on-the-Solent in Hampshire, approximately four miles west of Portsmouth, on the 15 December 1942, as the Blind Approach Development Unit. It was initially equipped with one Fairey Swordfish, a biplane torpedo bomber and one Fairey Fulmar, a carrier-borne reconnaissance/fighter aircraft. Nine months later the squadron moved to RNAS Worthy Down (HMS Kestrel), 3.5 miles (6 km) north of Winchester, Hampshire, England, on 14 September 1943, gaining Avro Anson a British twin-engine, multi-role training aircraft and Airspeed Oxford also a British two-engine training aircraft. It remained at RNAS Worthy Down for around one year before moving again. On 5 October 1944 the squadron relocated to RNAS Donibristle (HMS Merlin), located 2.7 miles (4.3 km) east of Rosyth, Fife. 739 Naval Air Squadron disbanded on 7 March 1945 at RNAS Donibristle, becoming 'C' Flight of 778 Naval Air Squadron.

=== Photographic Trials and Development Unit (1947–1950) ===
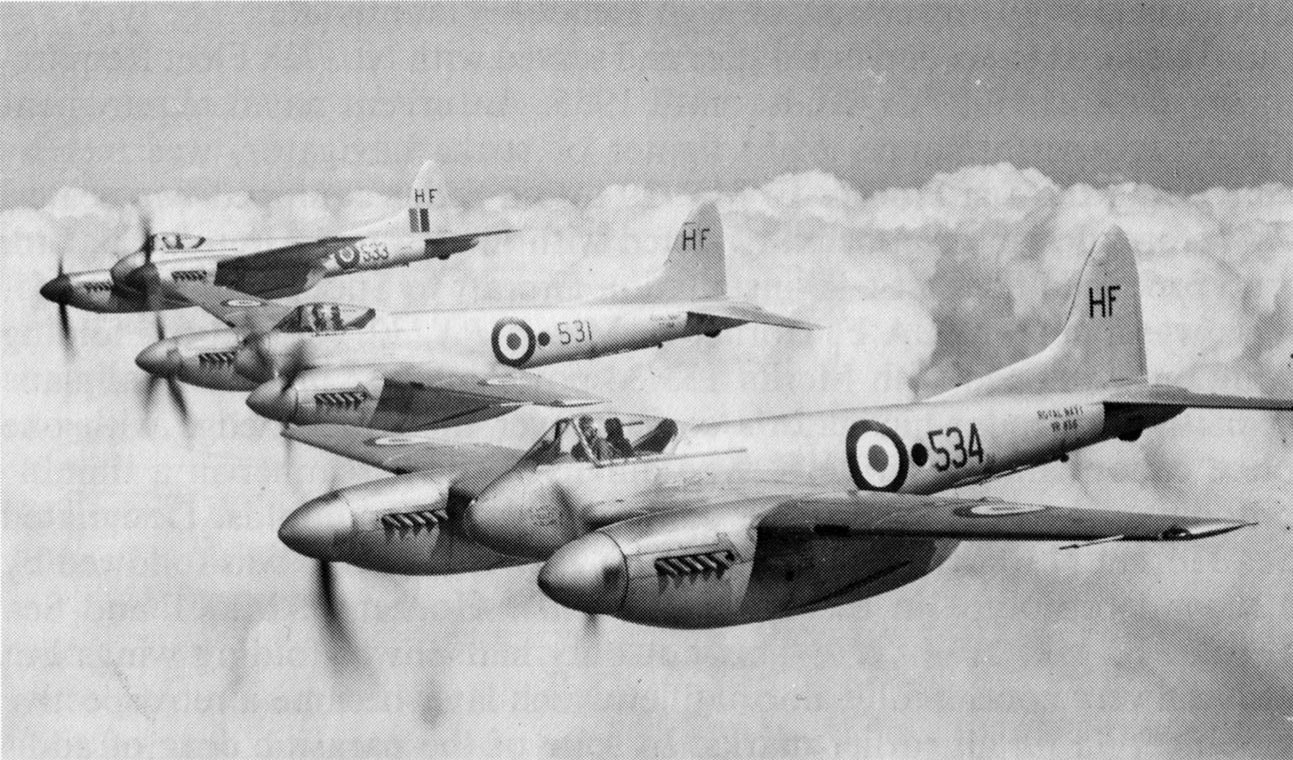
de Havilland Sea Hornet F Mk 20 of 728 NAS, examples of the type used by 739 NAS

739 Naval Air Squadron reformed on 1 May 1947 as the Photographic Development Unit, at RNAS Culham (HMS Hornbill), in Berkshire, England. The squadron was equipped with de Havilland Sea Mosquito TR.33, a navalised de Havilland Mosquito for Royal Navy use as a torpedo bomber. Its role was to work alongside the Royal Air Force’s Central Photographic Establishment (CPE) to ensure the Royal Navy was up to date with photographic reconnaissance. It was to have been attached to the CPE at RAF Benson, Oxfordshire, but due to hangar shortage had to use nearby RNAS Culham (HMS Hornbill) instead.

The squadron was also equipped with Avro Anson, a multi-role training aircraft and a de Havilland Dominie short-haul airliner and a Hawker Sea Fury fighter-bomber aircraft and a de Havilland Sea Hornet a navalised version of the de Havilland Hornet twin-engine fighter aircraft, were acquired for camera installation and evaluation. It had become the Strategic Reconnaissance Photographic Development Unit by 1950, however, in the July 739 Naval Air Squadron disbanded and became the Photographic Flight of 703 Naval Air Squadron.

== Aircraft flown ==
The squadron has flown a number of different aircraft types, including:

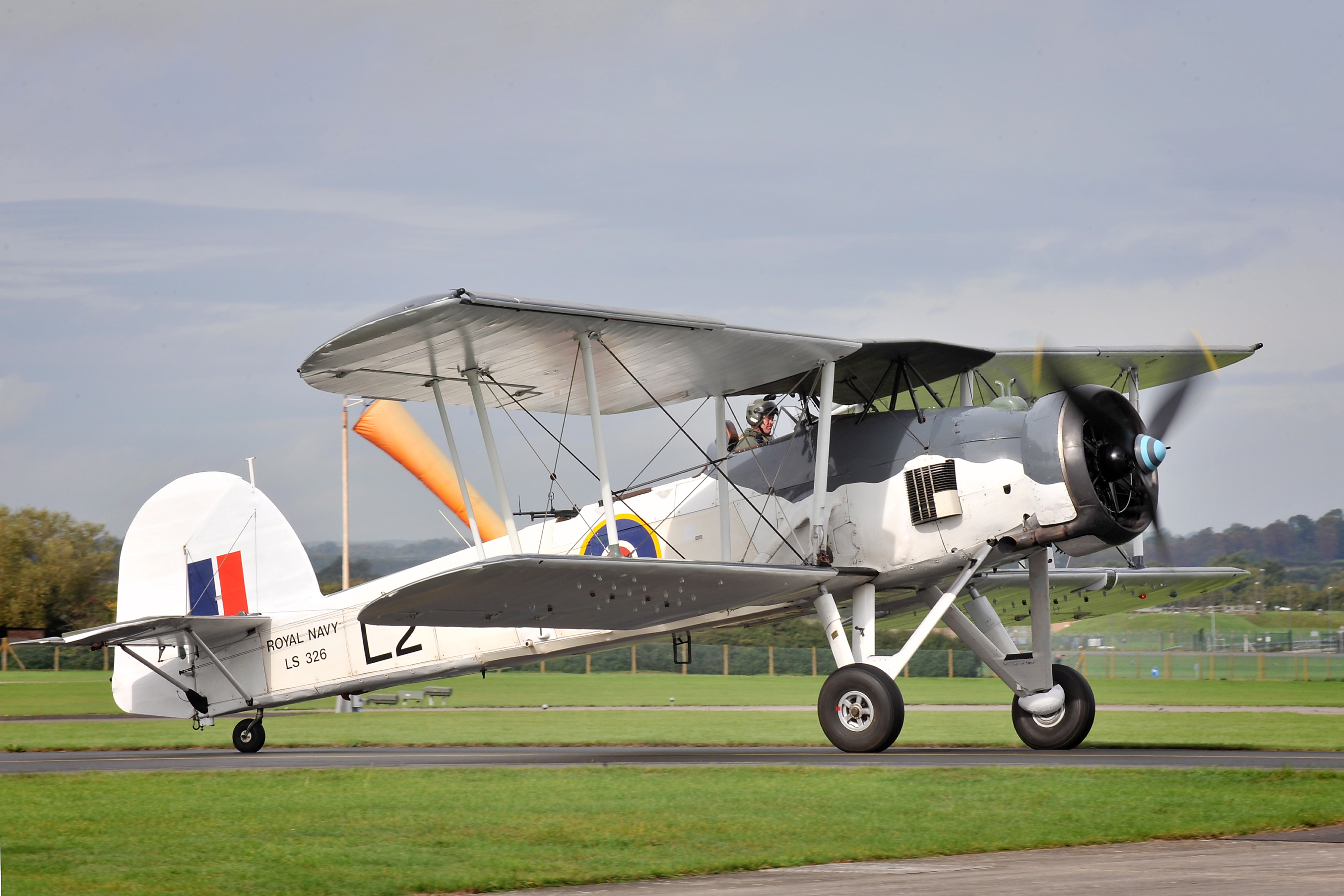
Fairey Swordfish

- Fairey Swordfish I torpedo bomber (December 1942 - November 1943)
- Fairey Fulmar Mk.II reconnaissance/fighter aircraft (December 1942 - August 1943)
- Avro Anson Mk I multi-role training aircraft (February 1943 - March 1945, May - December 1949)
- Airspeed Oxford training aircraft (February 1943 - March 1945)
- Fairey Swordfish II torpedo bomber (January 1945)
- Fairey Firefly I fighter and anti-submarine aircraft (February 1945)
- Fairey Barracuda Mk II torpedo and dive bomber (February 1945)
- de Havilland Sea Mosquito TR Mk.33 torpedo bomber (May 1947 - July 1950)
- de Havilland Dominie short-haul airliner (February 1948 - July 1950)
- Hawker Sea Fury FB.11 fighter-bomber (September 1948)
- de Havilland Sea Hornet PR.22 photo-reconnaissance aircraft (June 1949 - July 1950)
- de Havilland Sea Hornet F.20 fighter aircraft (August 1949 - July 1950)

== Naval air stations ==
739 Naval Air Squadron operated from a number of naval air station of the Royal Navy, in the United Kingdom:

1942 - 1945

- Royal Naval Air Station Lee-on-Solent (HMS Daedalus), Hampshire, (15 December 1942 - 14 September 1943)
  - Royal Naval Air Station Hinstock (HMS Godwit), Shropshire, (Detachment by June 1943)
- Royal Naval Air Station Worthy Down (HMS Kestrel), Hampshire, (14 September 1943 - 5 October 1944)
- Royal Naval Air Station Donibristle (HMS Merlin), Fife, (5 October 1944 - 7 March 1945)
- disbanded - (7 March 1945)

1947 - 1950

- Royal Naval Air Station Culham (HMS Hornbill), Oxfordshire, (1 May 1947 - 12 July 1950)
- disbanded - (12 July 1950)

== Commanding officers ==
List of commanding officers of 739 Naval Air Squadron with date of appointment:

1942 - 1945

- Lieutenant(A) J.G. Smith, RN, from 15 December 1942 (Lieutenant Commander 1 November 1944)
- Lieutenant Commander(A) G. Bennett, DSC, RN, from 17 January 1945
- disbanded - 7 March 1945

1947 - 1950

- Lieutenant B.A. MacCaw, DSC, RN, from 1 May 1947
- Lieutenant P.S. Cole, DSC, RN, from 23 November 1949
- disbanded - 12 July 1950

Note: Abbreviation (A) signifies Air Branch of the RN or RNVR.
