= RNAS Culham =

Former Royal Naval Air Station in Oxfordshire, England

RNAS Culham HMS Hornbill
- next to the village of Culham, in Oxfordshire; Near Oxford in England
- HMS Hornbill

Site information
- Type: Royal Naval Air Station
- Code: CM
- Owner: Admiralty
- Operator: Royal Navy
- Controlled by: Fleet Air Arm
- Condition: Disused

Location
- Shown within Oxfordshire RNAS Culham (the United Kingdom)
- Coordinates: 51°39′31″N 1°13′38″W

Site history
- Built: 1933
- In use: 1933-1960
- Fate: now Culham Science Centre
- Battles/wars: Second World War

Garrison information
- Garrison: Fleet Air Arm
- Occupants: Receipt and Despatch Unit No.2; No.1 Ferry Flight; 739 Squadron, SRPDU; 1832 RNVR (Air) Squadron

Airfield information
- Elevation: 190 feet (58 m) AMSL
Runways
Direction	Length and surface
06/24	1,200 yards (1,097 m) Asphalt concrete
10/28	1,400 yards (1,280 m) Asphalt concrete
17/35	1,200 yards (1,097 m) Asphalt concrete

Royal Naval Air Station Culham, commonly referred to as RNAS Culham; (commissioned HMS Hornbill) was a Royal Navy, Naval Air Station, near Culham, Oxfordshire. It opened in 1944 as an All-Weather Airfield for the Royal Navy. The naval air station was used by 739 Photographic Trials and Development Unit and was later and home to 1832 RNVR (Air) Squadron. Receipt and Despatch Unit No.2 and No.1 Ferry Flight were also based here.

The airbase was situated around 5 miles (8.0 km) south of the city of Oxford, with the village of Culham lying 1 mile (1.6 km) to west. The notable landmarks include the city of Oxford where through it runs The Isis, which then forms a loop around the airfield to the north, west and south as it flows south east. The market town of Abingdon-on-Thames is about 2 miles (3.2 km) to the north west. Didcot junction, where a line running north/south, intersects the Great Western Main Line, is situated 3 miles (4.8 km) south, with Culham railway station, on the north/south Oxford-Didcot line, at the south west corner of the airfield.

The ground layout was typical of many bomber stations, with three runways. However it had many hangars, mostly sited around the field's perimeter. Initially HMS Hornbill was used to train reservists based in the Thames Valley area using several different types of aircraft including: Supermarine Seafire, a navalised Supermarine Spitfire fighter aircraft, Hawker Sea Fury, a single-seat fighter aircraft and North American Harvards, an American single-engine advanced trainer aircraft. In May 1947 the Photographic Trials and Development Unit was based at HMS Hornbill, and in 1951 1840 Naval Air Squadron operated from the airfield for a short time. Ab initio flight training of cadets from Britannia Royal Naval College, Dartmouth, flying primary gliders, was also undertaken here in the early 1950s.

== Royal Navy operational history ==
=== Ferry Units ===
==== No. 1 Ferry Squadron ====
No. 1 Ferry Pool moved from RNAS Yeovilton to RNAS Culham and immediately formed as No. 1 Ferry Squadron, on 26 September 1946. The unit was allocated various aircraft:

- Avro Anson I (August 1947 - February 1947)
- Fairey Firefly F.1 (December 1946 - January 1947)
- Airspeed Oxford (September 1946 - February 1947)

In February 1947 the squadron was downgraded to become No.1 Ferry Flight, but remained at HMS Hornbill. It operated a number of different aircraft:

- Avro Anson I (February - October 1947)
- de Havilland Dominie (December 1947 - November 1950)
- Fairey Firefly FR.4 (April 1947 - September 1948)
- Fairey Firefly AS.5 (October 1949 - January 1950)
- Airspeed Oxford (February - November 1947)
- Supermarine Seafire F.17 (October 1947 - January 1948)

No. 1 Ferry Flight disbanded at HMS Hornbill on 31 August 1950.

=== Photographic Trials and Development Unit ===
On 1 May 1947, 739 Naval Air Squadron reformed at RNAS Culham (HMS Hornbill) to become the Royal Navy's Photographic Trials and Development Unit, (it had originally been intended to share the RAF's Photographic Reconnaissance resources at RAF Benson, but this had become overcrowded). The squadron operated de Havilland Sea Mosquito, a navalised variant of the de Havilland Mosquito, equipped as a torpedo bomber and a carrier-borne variant, and also the photo-reconnaissance version of the de Havilland Sea Hornet, a twin-engine fighter aircraft, until the unit finally disbanded on 12 July 1950.

=== Royal Naval Volunteer Reserve ===
Royal Naval Volunteer Reserve (RNVR) Pilots and Observers needed to have completed between seventy-five and 125 flying hours per year. This included non-continuous flying hours of training drills and fourteen days continuous training in air warfare and weapons, per year. Flying was mainly done during weekends, as there was a requirement for twelve weekends on squadron duty.

The Royal Naval Reserve Air Branch was reorganised into five air divisions on 1 June 1952. HMS Hornbill was home to the Southern Air Division which was initially formed of only 1832 Naval Air Squadron. On 1 October, 1832A and 1832B RNVR fighter Squadrons were formed, and then in March 1953 these became 1836 and 1835 Naval Air Squadrons respectively. The pooled aircraft, comprising Supermarine Seafire and Hawker Sea Fury, of the Southern Air Division was divided between the three squadrons.

==== 1832 Naval Air Squadron ====
1832 Naval Air Squadron re-formed at RNAS Culham on 1 July 1947 as a RNVR (Air) Fighter Squadron. Led by Lieutenant commander (A) P Godfrey OBE RNVR, the unit was one of four naval air squadrons formed in 1947 as the RNVR Air Branch, the other three were 1830 Naval Air Squadron in Glasgow at HMS Sanderling, 1831 Naval Air Squadron in Cheshire at HMS Blackcap, and 1833 Naval Air Squadron at HMS Gamecock in Warwickshire. The squadron was initially equipped with a single North American Harvard T.2B advanced trainer aircraft and four Supermarine Seafire III fighter aircraft, although later on it received six FR.46 variants of the fighter to replace the mark IIIs. In 1951 the unit replaced its inventory with Hawker Sea Fury FB.II. On 19 July 1953, 1832 Naval Air Squadron departed for RAF Benson.

==== 1840 Naval Air Squadron ====
1840 Naval Air Squadron re-formed at RNAS Culham on 14 April 1951 as a RNVR (Air) Anti-Submarine Squadron. The commanding officer was Lieutenant Commander (A) N H Bovey DSC, RNVR. Eight pilots and observers were detached from 1832 Naval Air Squadron and redeployed to the new squadron. It was equipped with six Fairey Firefly FR.4, a carrier-borne fighter and anti-submarine aircraft and two North American Harvard T.2b advanced trainer aircraft. The squadron remained at HMS Hornbill for just over two months and moved to RNAS Ford (HMS Peregrine) on 30 June 1951.

==== 1832A Naval Air Squadron ====
1832A Naval Air Squadron formed as a RNVR (Air) Fighter Squadron on 1 October 1952. It shared the Hawker Sea Fury FB.II fighter aircraft of 1832 Naval Air Squadron. Almost six months later it was re designated 1836 Naval Air Squadron, on 23 March 1953.

==== 1832B Naval Air Squadron ====
1832B Naval Air Squadron formed on 1 October 1952, as a RNVR (Air) Fighter Squadron, sharing the Hawker Sea Fury FB.II fighter aircraft of 1832 Naval Air Squadron with 1832A RNVR Squadron. Around six months later on 23 March 1953, it was redesignated 1836 Naval Air Squadron.

==== 1835 Naval Air Squadron ====
1835 Naval Air Squadron re-formed at RNAS Culham on 28 March 28 1953 as a RNVR (Air) Fighter Squadron by redesignating 1832B Naval Air Squadron. The commanding officer was Lieutenant Commander (A) A C B Ford DSC, RNVR. It shared a common pool of aircraft with 1832 and 1836 RNVR squadrons, which were Supermarine Seafire F.17 fighter aircraft and Hawker Sea Fury fighter aircraft, FB.11 and T.20 variants, together the three squadrons formed the RNVR Southern Air Division. 1835 Naval Air Squadron moved to RAF Benson on 19 July 1953.

==== 1836 Naval Air Squadron ====
1836 Naval Air Squadron re-formed at RNAS Culham on 28 March 1953, as a RNVR (Air) Fighter Squadron by redesignating 1832A Naval Air Squadron. It shared a pool of a number of Hawker Sea Fury, FB.11 and T.20 fighter aircraft, alongside some Supermarine Seafire F.17 fighter aircraft, with 1832 and 1835 RNVR Squadrons. The squadron was commanded by Lieutenant Commander (A) T O Adkin, RNVR and was a component of the RNVR Southern Air Division, alongside the other two squadrons. The division moved with its three squadrons to RAF Benson, on 19 July 1953.

=== Other Units ===
==== Station Flight ====
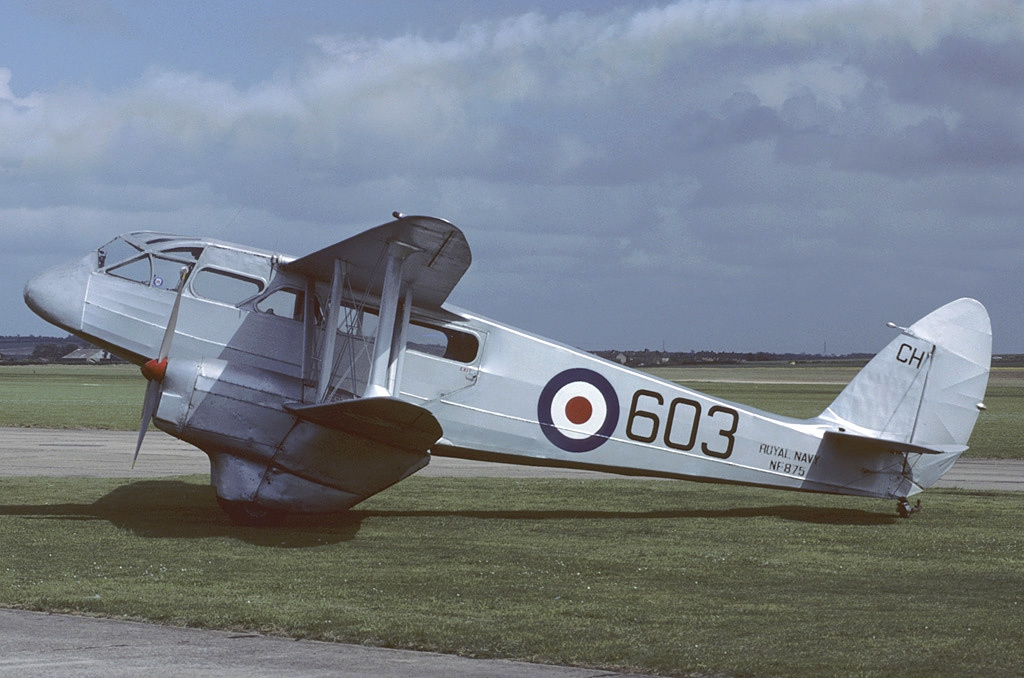
A Dominie in the markings of Royal Naval Air Station Culham, an example of the type used by the Station Flight

The Station Flight at RNAS Culham flew a number of different aircraft types, including:

- Stinson Reliant, a single-engine four- to five-seat liaison and training monoplane (March 1945)
- de Havilland Dominie, a short-haul biplane airliner, capable of accommodating 6–8 passengers (January - August 1959)
- Avro Anson I, a British twin-engine, multi-role aircraft (January 1949 - July 1950)

== Units ==
During the course of the operation of the airbase, the following Fleet Air Arm units were at sometime based at RNAS Culham:

- No. 1 Ferry Flight
- 739 Naval Air Squadron
- 812 Naval Air Squadron - 12/09/49 to 26/09/49, re-equipped with Fairey Firefly FR.5
- 1830 Naval Air Squadron - 12/05/53 to 15/05/53, 1830 RNVR (Air) Anti-Submarine Squadron, with Fairey Firefly AS6
- 1832 Naval Air Squadron
- 1832A Naval Air Squadron
- 1832B Naval Air Squadron
- 1835 Naval Air Squadron
- 1836 Naval Air Squadron
- 1840 Naval Air Squadron

== Closure ==
HMS Hornbill was ‘paid off’ on Saturday 30 May 1953 and the airbase was put into Reserve Airfield Status. The following year it was then moved to Care and Maintenance Status, remaining so between 1954 - 59. From March 1956 it was used as an Admiralty Storage Depot.

== Post Royal Navy and current use ==
The United Kingdom Atomic Energy Authority identified Culham as a site for the construction of a purpose built laboratory for plasma physics and fusion research, in the late 1950s. Construction of the Culham Laboratory (as previously known) was started in the early 1960s and the facility was officially opened in 1965. Now known as Culham Campus, the current research programme is through the Culham Centre for Fusion Energy (CCFE). The Joint European Torus (JET) nuclear fusion project is based at the site and is now (2026) in decommissioning phase.
