= 1835 Naval Air Squadron =

Inactive Royal Navy Fleet Air Arm and Reserve Air Squadron

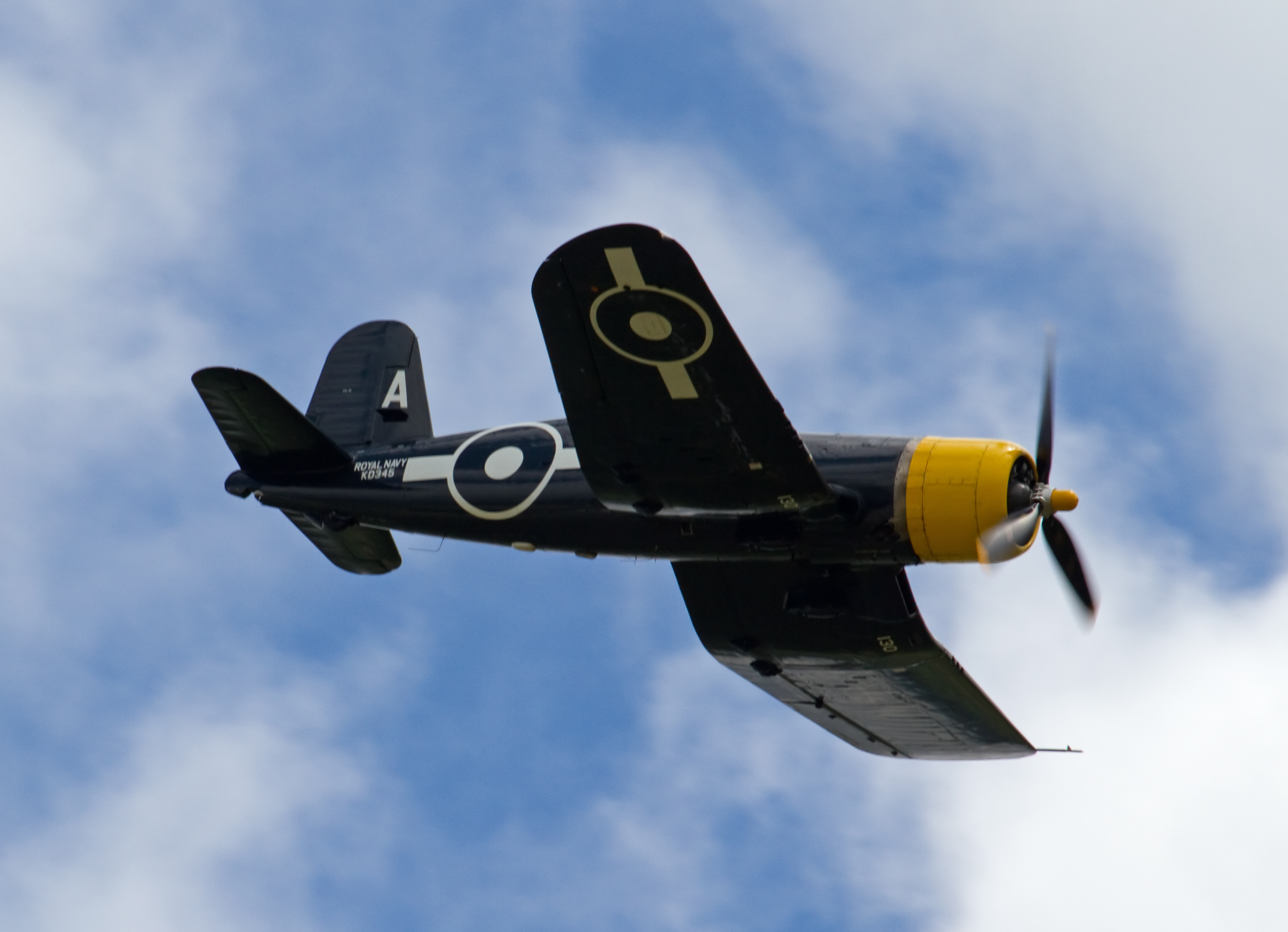
- Vought Corsair; an example of the type used by 1835 NAS
- Active: 1943; 1944–1945; 1953–1957
- Disbanded: 10 March 1957
- Country: United Kingdom
- Branch: Royal Navy
- Type: Single-seat fighter squadron; Royal Naval Volunteer Reserve Air Squadron
- Role: Carrier-based fighter squadron
- Size: ten / fourteen aircraft (1943-45); Shared aircraft pool (RNVR)
- Part of: Fleet Air Arm
- Home station: See Naval air stations section for full list.

Insignia
- Identification Markings: 5A+ (1943); 1+V11 (from December 1944); single letters (April 1945)

Aircraft flown
- Fighter: Vought Corsair

1835 Naval Air Squadron (1835 NAS) was a Fleet Air Arm (FAA) naval air squadron of the United Kingdom’s Royal Navy (RN). It was established as a fighter squadron in the United States at HMS Saker II, RNAS Quonset Point in August 1943. Rather than returning to the United Kingdom to join the 47th Naval Fighter Wing, the squadron was disbanded in November 1943, at RN Air Section Brunswick, Maine. The squadron was reconstituted at Brunswick in December 1944. It transferred to Northern Ireland and arrived at RNAS Eglinton (HMS Gannet) in April 1945. The squadron was designated for the 17th Carrier Air Group of the British Pacific Fleet; however, the conclusion of the Second World War prevented this deployment. The squadron was ultimately disbanded at RNAS Nutts Corner (HMS Pintail) in September 1945. It reformed as a Royal Naval Volunteer Reserve Air Branch fighter squadron, in the Southern Air Division, from 1953 and disbanded in 1957.

== History ==
=== Single-seat fighter squadron (1943) ===
The personnel of 1835 Naval Air Squadron gathered at HMS Waxwing which served as the Fleet Air Arm Transit Camp, Royal Naval Air Establishment (RNAE) Townhill, Dunfermline, Fife, on 1 July 1943 for passage to the USA.

The squadron was formed on 15 August at RNAS Quonset Point (HMS Saker II), situated at the United States Naval Air Station Quonset Point in Rhode Island. The Admiralty having obtained access to this facility beginning in October 1943. The unit was established as a single-seat fighter squadron under the leadership of Lieutenant Commander(A) M.S. Godson, RN, and was originally equipped with ten Vought Corsair aircraft, these were the Vought Chance built F4U-1 and known as the Corsair Mk I in the Fleet Air Arm.

On 30 August, the squadron relocated to RN Air Section Brunswick, located at the US Naval Air Station in Brunswick, Maine, to proceed with its training. By October, the squadron had transitioned to Corsair Mk. II, these were the Vought Chance built F4U-1A variant of the fighter aircraft, intending to integrate into the 47th Naval Fighter Wing alongside the 1834 and 1836 Naval Air Squadrons. Nevertheless, changes in planning led to the squadron's disbandment on 23 November 1943, to establish 732 Naval Air Squadron the new Corsair Operational Training Unit at Brunswick.

=== Single-seat fighter squadron (1944-1945) ===
1835 Naval Air Squadron was re-established at RN Air Section Brunswick, on 1 December 1944, functioning once more as a single-seat fighter squadron under the command of Lieutenant Commander(A) T.J.A. King-Joyce RN. The squadron received a complement of eighteen Vought Corsair Mk IV aircraft, specifically the FG-1D model produced by Goodyear. Upon completing their operations in the United States, the squadron personnel departed from RN Air Section Brunswick on 20 March 1945, leaving their aircraft behind. They arrived in the United Kingdom on 4 April and subsequently regrouped at RNAS Eglinton (HMS Gannet), County Londonderry, Northern Ireland, on 21 April, where they received eighteen new Vought Corsair Mk III, this variant being the Brewster built F3A-1 and F3A-1D.

In June, the squadron phased out this variant, taking possession of twenty-one Vought Corsair Mk IV, before relocating to RNAS Belfast (HMS Gadwall), County Antrim, on 29 June. Three weeks after their arrival at RNAS Belfast, the squadron boarded the Ruler-class escort carrier, HMS Premier, on 25 July for a week of rigorous Deck Landing Training (DLT). The squadron returned to RNAS Belfast on 2 August. The squadron was earmarked for the 17th Carrier Air Group of the British Pacific Fleet, but following the announcement of Japan's surrender on 15 August, the squadron's future became unclear. On 23 August, they moved to RNAS Nutts Corner (HMS Piintail), County Antrim, where they were scheduled to disband on 3 September 1945.

== Royal Naval Volunteer Reserve Air Squadron ==
=== Fighter squadron ===
On 28 March 1953, 1835 Naval Air Squadron reformed at RNAS Culham (HMS Hornbill), Oxfordshire, England, as a Royal Naval Volunteer Reserve fighter squadron in the Southern Air Division, under the command of Lieutenant Commander(A) A.C.B. Ford, DSC, RNVR. It was essentially a renaming of 1832A Naval Air Squadron. The squadron shared a pool of aircraft with 1832 and 1836 Naval Air Squadrons. The RNVR squadron disbanded on 10 March 1957 under the White Paper defence cuts of that year.

== Aircraft flown ==
1835 Naval Air Squadron flew different variants of only one aircraft type:

- Vought Corsair Mk I fighter aircraft (August - November 1943)
- Vought Corsair Mk II fighter aircraft (October - November 1943)
- Vought Corsair Mk IV fighter aircraft (December 1944 - August 1945)
- Vought Corsair Mk III fighter aircraft (April - June 1945)

== Naval air stations ==
1835 Naval Air Squadron operated mostly from a number of naval air stations of the Royal Navy in the UK and overseas and utilised a Royal Navy escort carrier:

1943

- Royal Naval Air Station Quonset Point (HMS Saker II), Rhode Island, (15 - 30 August 1943)
- RN Air Section Brunswick, Maine, (30 August - 23 November 1943)
- disbanded - (23 November 1943)

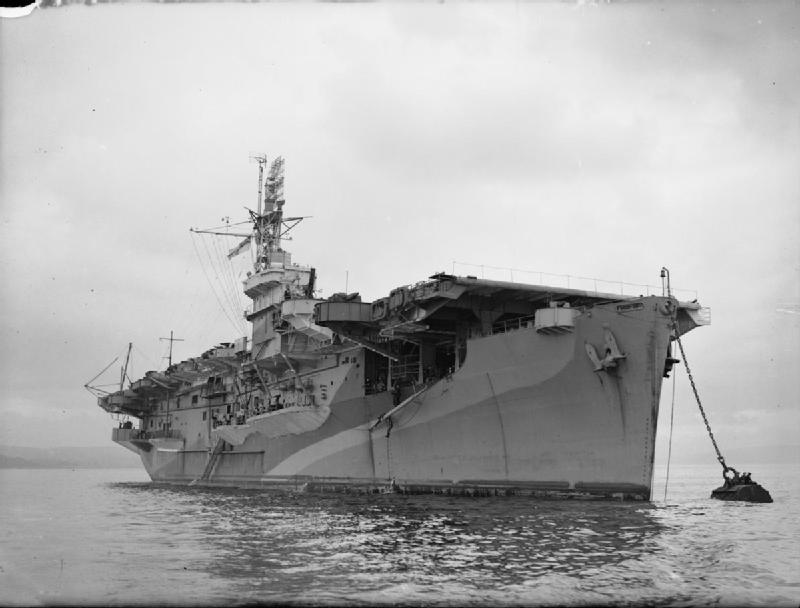
HMS Premier

1944-1945

- RN Air Section Brunswick, Maine, (1 December 1944 - 20 March 1945)
- passage to UK crews (20 March - 4 April 1945)
- Royal Naval Air Station Eglinton (HMS Gannet), County Londonderry, (21 April - 29 June 1945)
- Royal Naval Air Station Belfast (HMS Gadwall), County Antrim, (29 June - 25 July 1945)
- HMS Premier (Deck Landing Training (DLT) 25 July - 2 August 1945)
- Royal Naval Air Station Belfast (HMS Gadwall), County Antrim, (2 - 23 August 1945)
- Royal Naval Air Station Nutts Corner (HMS Pintail), County Antrim, (23 August - 3 September 1945)
- disbanded - (3 September 1945)

1953 - 1957

- Royal Naval Air Station Culham (HMS Hornbill), Oxfordshire, (ex-1832A Naval Air Squadron 28 March 1953 - 18 July 1953)
- Royal Air Force Benson, Oxfordshire, (18 July 1953 - 10 March 1957)
- disbanded - (10 March 1957)

== Commanding officers ==
List of commanding officers of 1835 Naval Air Squadron with date of appointment:

Note: Abbreviation (A) signifies Air Branch of the RN or RNVR.

1943

- Lieutenant Commander(A) M.S. Godson, RN, from 15 August 1943
- disbanded - 23 November 1943

1944-1945

- Lieutenant Commander(A) T.J.A. King-Joyce, RN, from 1 December 1944
- disbanded - 3 September 1945

1953-1957

- Lieutenant Commander(A) A.C.B. Ford, DSC, RNVR, from 28 March 1953
- Lieutenant Commander(A) P.J. Robins, RNVR, from 31 October 1953
- Lieutenant Commander(A) N.J. Cook, RNVR, from 20 June 1956
- disbanded - 10 March 1957
