= Allied order of battle for Operation Mascot =

Operation Mascot was an unsuccessful British carrier air raid conducted against the German battleship Tirpitz at her anchorage in Kaafjord, Norway, on 17 July 1944. Few of the British airmen were able to spot the battleship, and their attacks did not inflict any significant damage. Tirpitz was eventually disabled and then sunk by Royal Air Force heavy bombers later in the year.

== Home Fleet forces dispatched ==
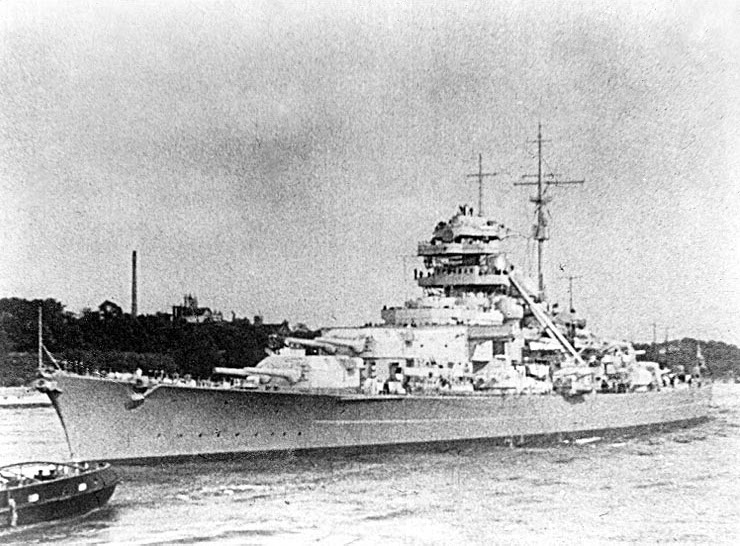
Tirpitz during trials, September 1940

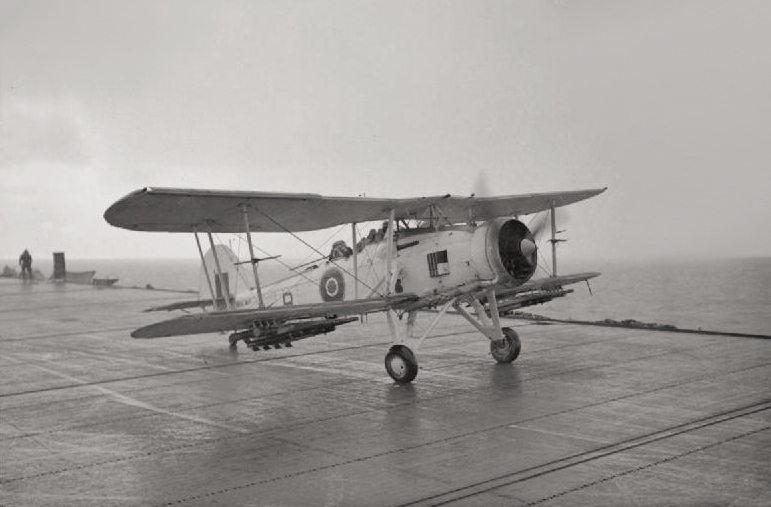
Fairey Swordfish

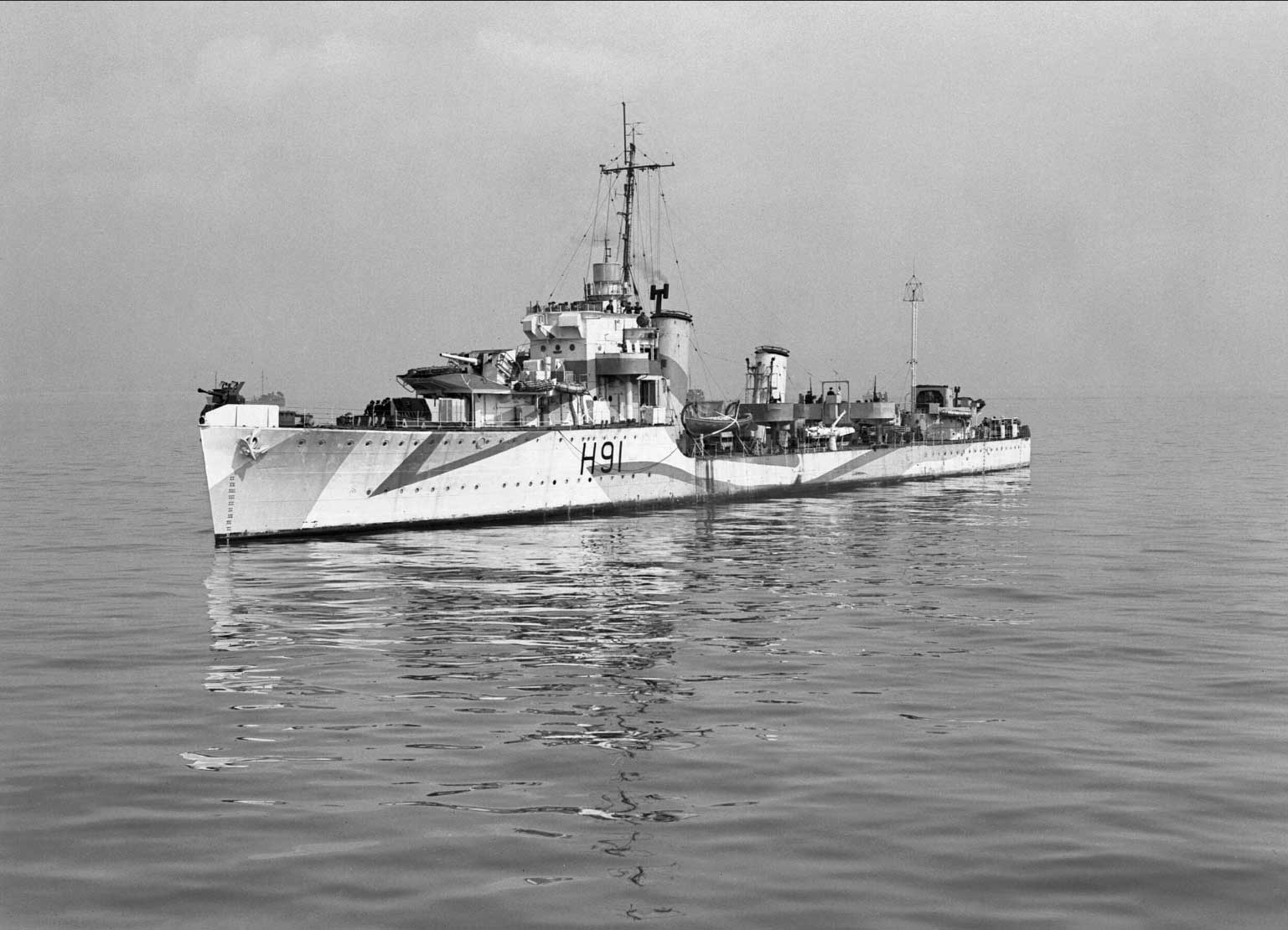
Destroyer Bulldog

The attack force comprised the following ships and Fleet Air Arm units:

Flagship of Admiral Henry R. Moore
1 King George V-class battleship (10 × 14-inch main btty, 28 kn): HMS Duke of York

First Cruiser Squadron

HMS Formidable

1841 Naval Air Squadron (18 Vought F4U Corsairs)
No. 8 Torpedo Bomber Reconnaissance Wing

827 Naval Air Squadron (12 Fairey Barracudas)
830 Naval Air Squadron (12 Barracudas)

HMS Furious

880 Naval Air Squadron (12 Supermarine Seafires)
1840 Naval Air Squadron (20 Grumman F6F Hellcats)
842 Flight (3 Fairey Swordfish)

HMS Indefatigable

894 Naval Air Squadron (16 Seafires)
1770 Naval Air Squadron (12 Fairey Fireflys)
No. 9 Torpedo Bomber Reconnaissance Wing

820 Naval Air Squadron (12 Barracudas)
826 Naval Air Squadron (12 Barracudas)

2 County-class heavy cruisers (8 × 8-inch main btty, 31.5 kn): HMS Devonshire, HMS Kent
1 Dido-class light cruiser (8 × 5.25-inch main btty, 32.25 kn): HMS Bellona
1 Fiji-class light cruiser (12 × 6-inch main btty, 31.25 kn): HMS Jamaica

Third Destroyer Flotilla

6 V-class: HMS Verulam, HMS Vigilant, HMS Virago, HMS Volage, HMCS Algonquin, HMCS Sioux
4 M-class: HMS Milne (flagship), HMS Marne, HMS Matchless, HMS Musketeer
1 S-class: HMS Scourge
1 Tribal-class: HMS Nubian (F36)

20th Escort Group

3 Captain-class frigates: (Note: Ex-US Evarts-class destroyer escorts) HMS Burges (flagship), HMS Hoste, HMS Inman
1 B-class destroyer: HMS Bulldog

== Strike force ==
The strike force launched in the early hours of 17 July comprised the following units:

- No. 8 Torpedo Bomber Reconnaissance Wing (21 Barracudas)
- No. 9 Torpedo Bomber Reconnaissance Wing (23 Barracudas)
- 1770 Naval Air Squadron (12 Fireflys)
- 1840 Naval Air Squadron (20 Hellcats)
- 1841 Naval Air Squadron (18 Corsairs)
