= German submarine U-277 =

German World War II submarine

Coordinates: 73°24′N 15°32′E

History

Nazi Germany
- Name: U-277
- Ordered: 10 April 1941
- Builder: Bremer Vulkan, Bremen-Vegesack
- Yard number: 42
- Laid down: 3 March 1942
- Launched: 7 November 1942
- Commissioned: 21 December 1942
- Fate: Sunk on 1 May 1944

General characteristics
- Class & type: Type VIIC submarine
- Displacement: 769 tonnes (757 long tons) surfaced; 871 t (857 long tons) submerged
- Length: 67.10 m (220 ft 2 in) o/a; 50.50 m (165 ft 8 in) pressure hull
- Beam: 6.20 m (20 ft 4 in) o/a; 4.70 m (15 ft 5 in) pressure hull
- Height: 9.60 m (31 ft 6 in)
- Draught: 4.74 m (15 ft 7 in)
- Installed power: 2,800–3,200 PS (2,100–2,400 kW; 2,800–3,200 bhp) (diesels); 750 PS (550 kW; 740 shp) (electric)
- Propulsion: 2 shafts; 2 × diesel engines; 2 × electric motors
- Speed: 17.7 knots (32.8 km/h; 20.4 mph) surfaced; 7.6 knots (14.1 km/h; 8.7 mph) submerged
- Range: 8,500 nmi (15,700 km; 9,800 mi) at 10 knots (19 km/h; 12 mph) surfaced; 80 nmi (150 km; 92 mi) at 4 knots (7.4 km/h; 4.6 mph) submerged
- Test depth: 230 m (750 ft); Crush depth: 250–295 m (820–968 ft)
- Complement: 4 officers, 40–56 enlisted
- Armament: 5 × 53.3 cm (21 in) torpedo tubes (four bow, one stern); 14 × torpedoes or 26 TMA mines; 1 × 8.8 cm (3.46 in) deck gun (220 rounds); 2 × twin 2 cm (0.79 in) C/30 anti-aircraft guns

Service record
- Part of: 8th U-boat Flotilla; 21 December 1942 – 31 May 1943; 6th U-boat Flotilla; 1 June – 31 October 1943; 13th U-boat Flotilla; 1 November 1943 – 1 May 1944
- Identification codes: M 49 190
- Commanders: Oblt.z.S. / Kptlt. Robert Lübsen; 21 December 1942 – 1 May 1944
- Operations: 6 patrols: 1st patrol: 29 June – 17 August 1943; 2nd patrol: a. 29 August – 10 October 1943; b. 30 – 31 October 1943; c. 8 – 9 November 1943; 3rd patrol: 12 November – 22 December 1943; 4th patrol: a. 23 December 1943 – 6 January 1944; b. 8 – 10 January 1944; c. 12 – 14 January 1944; d. 16 – 18 January 1944; e. 20 – 23 March 1944; 5th patrol: 25 March – 6 April 1944; 6th patrol: 11 April – 1 May 1944
- Victories: None

German submarine U-277 was a Type VIIC U-boat of Nazi Germany's Kriegsmarine during World War II.

The submarine was laid down on 3 March 1942 at the Bremer Vulkan yard at Bremen-Vegesack as yard number 42. She was launched on 7 November 1942 and commissioned on 21 December under the command of Oberleutnant zur See Robert Lübsen.

== Design ==
German Type VIIC submarines were preceded by the shorter Type VIIB submarines. U-277 had a displacement of 769 tonnes (757 long tons) when at the surface and 871 tonnes (857 long tons) while submerged. She had a total length of 67.10 m (220 ft 2 in), a pressure hull length of 50.50 m (165 ft 8 in), a beam of 6.20 m (20 ft 4 in), a height of 9.60 m (31 ft 6 in), and a draught of 4.74 m (15 ft 7 in). The submarine was powered by two Germaniawerft F46 four-stroke, six-cylinder supercharged diesel engines producing a total of 2,800 to 3,200 metric horsepower (2,060 to 2,350 kW; 2,760 to 3,160 shp) for use while surfaced, two AEG GU 460/8–27 double-acting electric motors producing a total of 750 metric horsepower (550 kW; 740 shp) for use while submerged. She had two shafts and two 1.23 m (4 ft) propellers. The boat was capable of operating at depths of up to 230 metres (750 ft).

The submarine had a maximum surface speed of 17.7 knots (32.8 km/h; 20.4 mph) and a maximum submerged speed of 7.6 knots (14.1 km/h; 8.7 mph). When submerged, the boat could operate for 80 nautical miles (150 km; 92 mi) at 4 knots (7.4 km/h; 4.6 mph); when surfaced, she could travel 8,500 nautical miles (15,700 km; 9,800 mi) at 10 knots (19 km/h; 12 mph). U-277 was fitted with five 53.3 cm (21 in) torpedo tubes (four fitted at the bow and one at the stern), fourteen torpedoes, one 8.8 cm (3.46 in) SK C/35 naval gun, 220 rounds, and two twin 2 cm (0.79 in) C/30 anti-aircraft guns. The boat had a complement of between forty-four and sixty.

== Service history ==
U-277 served with the 8th U-boat Flotilla for training from December 1942 to May 1943 and operationally with the 6th U-boat Flotilla from 1 June. She carried out six patrols, but sank no ships. She was a member of six wolfpacks.

She carried out a short voyage between Kiel in Germany and Bergen in Norway over June 1943.

=== First patrol ===
The boat departed Bergen on 29 June 1943 and docked at Hammerfest via Bear Island on 17 August.

=== Second patrol ===
For her second sortie, U-277 departed Hammerfest on 29 August 1943. Her route took her as far north as Svalbard before arriving at Narvik on 10 October.

=== Third and fourth patrols ===
The boat's third patrol took her round Bear Island, but was otherwise uneventful.

Her fourth foray was followed by a series of short 'hops' between Hammerfest, Narvik, Trondheim and Bergen. During one of them, she ran aground and had to be towed off the offending rocks. The damage caused forced an immediate return to base.

=== Fifth and sixth patrols and loss ===
Her penultimate, official patrol was between Narvik and Hammerfest.

She left Hammerfest for the last time on 11 April 1944. She was sunk southwest of Bear Island by depth charges dropped from a Fairey Swordfish of No. 842 Squadron, Fleet Air Arm on 1 May. The aircraft had come from the carrier HMS Fencer.

Fifty men died; there were no survivors.

=== Wolfpacks ===
U-277 took part in six wolfpacks, namely:

- Monsun (30 August – 7 October 1943)
- Monsun (17 – 23 November 1943)
- Eisenbart (23 November – 21 December 1943)
- Blitz (25 March – 4 April 1944)
- Donner (11 – 20 April 1944)
- Donner & Keil (20 April – 1 May 1944)

== Bibliography ==
- Busch, Rainer; Röll, Hans-Joachim (1999). German U-boat commanders of World War II : a biographical dictionary. Translated by Brooks, Geoffrey. London, Annapolis, Md: Greenhill Books, Naval Institute Press. ISBN 1-55750-186-6.
- Busch, Rainer; Röll, Hans-Joachim (1999). Der U-Boot-Krieg, 1939-1945: Deutsche U-Boot-Verluste von September 1939 bis Mai 1945 [German U-boat losses from September 1939 to May 1945] (in German). Vol. IV. Hamburg, Berlin, Bonn: Mittler. ISBN 3-8132-0514-2.
- Gröner, Erich; Jung, Dieter; Maass, Martin (1991). U-boats and Mine Warfare Vessels. German Warships 1815–1945. Vol. 2. Translated by Thomas, Keith; Magowan, Rachel. London: Conway Maritime Press. ISBN 0-85177-593-4.
- Kemp, Paul (1999). U-Boats Destroyed – German Submarine Losses in the World Wars. London: Arms & Armour. ISBN 1-85409-515-3.
