= HMS Fencer =

Royal Navy escort carrier

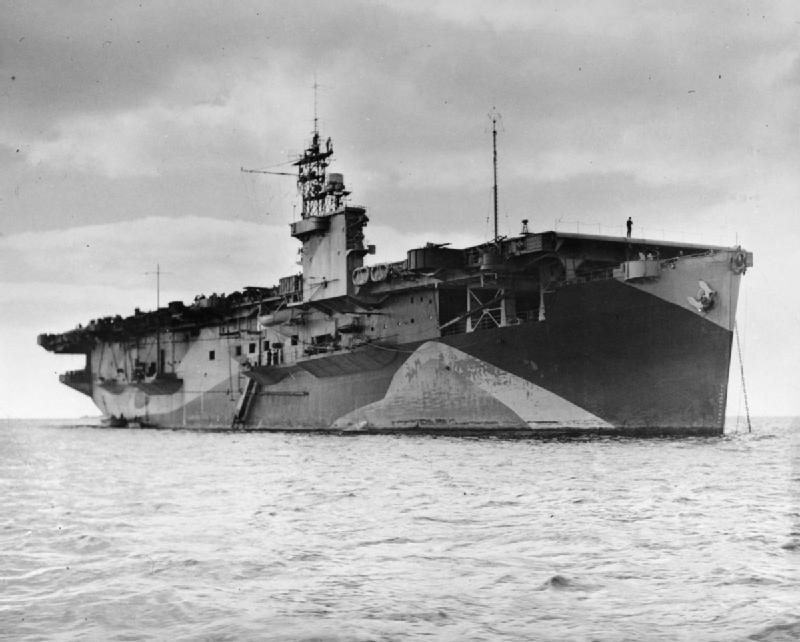
- HMS Fencer c. 1945

History

United States
- Name: Croatan
- Namesake: Croatan Sound, North Carolina
- Ordered: as type (C3-S-A1) hull, MC hull 197
- Awarded: 30 September 1940
- Builder: Western Pipe and Steel Company, San Francisco, California
- Cost: $7,992,456
- Yard number: 77
- Way number: 4
- Laid down: 5 September 1941
- Launched: 4 April 1942
- Commissioned: 20 February 1943
- Decommissioned: 27 February 1943
- Reclassified: ACV, 20 Aug 1942; CVE, 15 July 1943
- Identification: Hull symbol: AVG-14; ACV-14; CVE-14
- Fate: Transferred to the Royal Navy, 27 February 1943

United Kingdom
- Name: Fencer
- Namesake: One who participates in the sport of fencing
- Acquired: 27 February 1943
- Commissioned: 1 March 1943
- Decommissioned: 11 December 1946
- Identification: Pennant number: D64 (Atlantic service); R308 (Pacific service)
- Honours and awards: Atlantic 1943–1944; Salerno 1943; South France 1944; Aegean 1944
- Fate: Returned to the US Navy, 11 December 1946

United States
- Name: CVE-14
- Acquired: 11 December 1946
- Stricken: 28 January 1947
- Fate: Sold for commercial use, 30 December 1947

General characteristics
- Class & type: Bogue-class escort carrier (USA); Attacker-class escort carrier (UK)
- Displacement: 10,200 long tons (10,360 t) (standard); 14,400 long tons (14,630 t) (full load)
- Length: 465 ft (142 m) (wl); 496 ft (151 m) (oa); 440 ft (130 m) (fd)
- Beam: 69 ft 6 in (21.18 m) wl; 82 ft (25 m) (fd); 111 ft 6 in (33.99 m) (extreme width)
- Draught: 23 ft 3 in (7.09 m) (mean); 26 ft (7.9 m) (deep load)
- Installed power: 2 × Foster-Wheeler 285 psi (1,970 kPa) boilers; 8,500 shp (6,300 kW)
- Propulsion: 1 × General Electric or Westinghouse steam turbine; 1 × Screw
- Speed: 18 kn (33 km/h; 21 mph)
- Range: 27,300 nmi (50,600 km; 31,400 mi) at 11 kn (20 km/h; 13 mph)
- Capacity: 3,100 long tons (3,150 t) (fuel oil); 50,000 US gal (190,000 L; 42,000 imp gal) (Avgas)
- Complement: 646
- Armament: 2 × single 5 in (127 mm)/51 caliber gun (removed by RN); 2 × single QF 4 in (100 mm) Mk V dual-purpose guns (installed by RN); 4 × twin 40 mm (1.57 in) Bofors antiaircraft (AA) guns; 8 × twin 20 mm (0.79 in) Oerlikon cannons; 10 × single 20 mm Oerlikon cannons
- Aircraft carried: 24
- Aviation facilities: 1 × hydraulic catapult; 2 × elevators

Service record
- Part of: British Pacific Fleet (1944–1945)
- Operations: Battle of the Atlantic (1943–1944); Operation Tungsten (1944)

HMS Fencer (D64/R308) was an American-built Attacker-class escort carrier that served with the Royal Navy during the Second World War.

Acquired by the United States Navy for conversion to a Bogue-class escort carrier; she was transferred to the Royal Navy and commissioned as Fencer on 1 March 1943, under the Lend-Lease agreement. She spent most of her career escorting convoys in the North Atlantic and Arctic Ocean, she transferred to the British East Indies Fleet in October 1944.

== Construction ==
Fencer was laid down 5 September 1941, as a C3-S-A1 freighter, under Maritime Commission contract, MC hull #197, by Western Pipe and Steel Company, in San Francisco, California. The hull was purchased by the US Navy to be converted to a Bogue-class escort carrier and named Croatan (AVG-14). While under construction she was transferred to the Admiralty under the Lend-Lease agreement, with a Royal Navy commissioning crew arriving in May 1942, under the command of Commander C.N. Lentaigne, RN. She was launched on 4 April 1942, sponsored by Mrs. Powers Symington. She was redesignated as ACV-14, on 20 Aug 1942. She was commissioned into the US Navy on 20 February 1943, as Croatan, and decommissioned and transferred to the RN, on 27 February 1943. She was commissioned into the RN, on 1 March 1943, as HMS Fencer (D64), with Captain E.W. Anstice, RN in command.

== Design and description ==
Fencer was the fourth ship in what became the Royal Navy's Attacker-class of 11 ships; one of 38 escort carriers built in the United States for the Royal Navy during the Second World War. The Western Pipe & Steel shipyards built three other ships in the class. Once completed she was supplied under the terms of Lend-Lease agreement to the Royal Navy. There was a ships complement of 646 men, who lived in crew accommodation that was significantly different from the arrangements that were normal for the Royal Navy at the time. The separate messes no longer had to prepare their own food, as everything was cooked in the galley and served cafeteria style in a central dining area. They were also equipped with a modern laundry and a barber shop. The traditional hammocks were replaced by three-tier bunk-beds, 18 to a cabin, which were hinged and could be tied up to provide extra space when not in use.

Fencer had an overall length of 496 ft (151 m), a beam of 69 ft 6 in (21.18 m) and a draught of 24 ft (7.3 m). She displaced 14,400 long tons (14,600 t) at full load. Power was provided by two boilers feeding steam to a turbine driving one shaft, giving 8,500 bhp (6,300 kW), which could propel the ship at 18 kn (33 km/h; 21 mph).

She had the capacity for up to 24 aircraft which could be a mixture of anti-submarine and fighter aircraft; the British Hawker Sea Hurricane and Supermarine Seafire naval fighters, Fairey Swordfish torpedo bomber or the American-supplied Grumman Martlet and Vought F4U Corsair fighters or Grumman Avenger torpedo bomber could be carried. The exact composition of the embarked squadrons depended upon the mission. Some squadrons were composite squadrons for convoy defence and would be equipped with both anti-submarine and fighter aircraft, while other squadrons working in a strike carrier role would only be equipped with fighter aircraft. Aircraft facilities were a small combined bridge–flight control on the starboard side and above the 450 ft × 120 ft (137 m × 37 m) flight deck, two aircraft lifts 42 ft × 34 ft (13 m × 10 m), and nine arrestor wires. Aircraft could be housed in the 260 ft × 62 ft (79 m × 19 m) hangar below the flight deck.

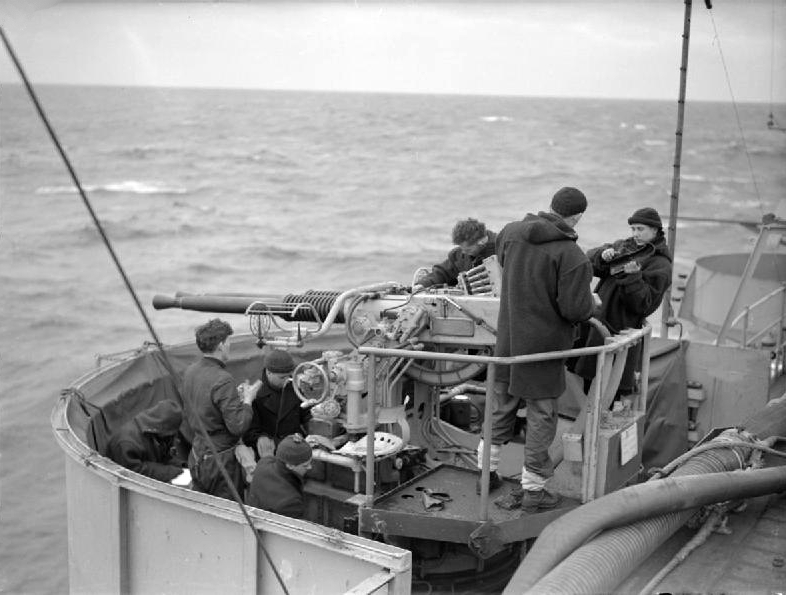
A typical twin 40 mm Bofors anti-aircraft gun mounting on the Attacker-class.

The ships armament concentrated on anti-aircraft (AA) defence and comprised two QF 4 in (100 mm) MK V dual purpose guns in single mounts, eight 40 mm (1.57 in) Bofors guns in twin mounts and ten 20 mm (0.79 in) Oerlikon cannons in single and eight in twin mounts.

Fencer was designed to accompany other ships forming the escort for convoys. The anti-submarine aircraft employed were initially the Fairey Swordfish and later the Grumman Avenger, which could be armed with torpedoes, depth charges, 250 lb (110 kg) bombs or RP-3 rocket projectiles. As well as carrying out their own attacks on U-Boats, these aircraft identified their locations for the convoy's escorts to mount an attack. Typically anti-submarine patrols would be flown between dawn and dusk. One aircraft would fly about 10 mi (16 km) ahead of the convoy, while another patrolled astern. Patrols would last between two and three hours, using both radar and visual observation in their search for U-Boats. Fencer also had a secondary role, providing oil and provisions for her accompanying destroyers. This could be a lengthy process and was done on the move. It took 40 minutes from firing a line across to the destroyer to start pumping oil, while it took another two hours to pump 98 tons of oil and a further 35 minutes to disconnect the hose pipe and secure the equipment.

== Service history ==
As an anti-submarine warfare (ASW) carrier, Fencer escorted convoys in the North Atlantic and to Russia.

On 10 February 1944, while escorting Convoy ON 223 in the North Atlantic west of Ireland, one of her Fairey Swordfish from 842 squadron, sank German submarine U-666, with depth charges, 51 dead (all hands lost).

On 3 April 1944, along with her sister ships Pursuer and Searcher and the Ruler-class escort carrier Emperor, she participated in the Operation Tungsten, the strike on the German battleship Tirpitz. The escort carriers provided ASW cover for the battleships Duke of York and Anson and fleet carriers Victorious and Furious.

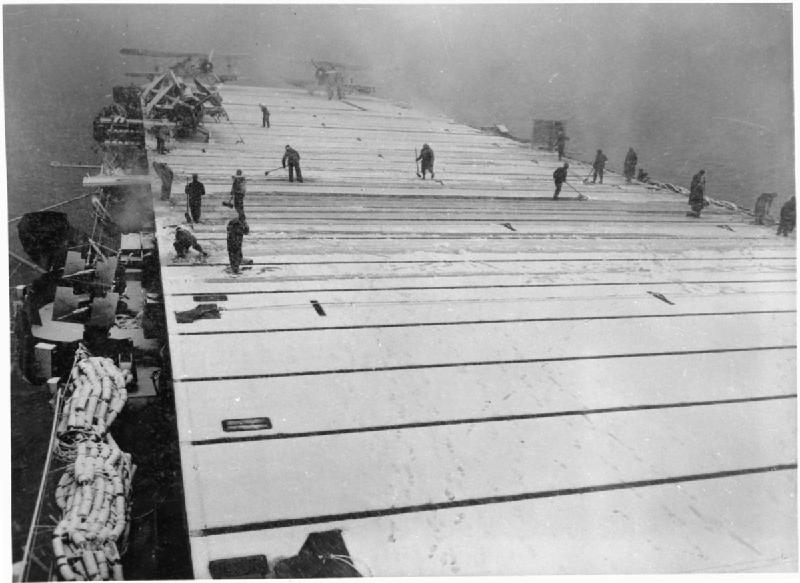
Fencer, May 1944, clearing snow from the flight deck during an Arctic convoy. Two Fairey Swordfish aircraft of 842 Naval Air Squadron, Fleet Air Arm can be seen at the far end of the flight deck.

When Operation Tungsten completed Fencer set sail for the Kola Inlet. On 28 April 1944, Fencer left Kola Inlet, as an escort for the 45 ship convoy RA 59, for Loch Ewe, in Scotland. On 30 April, William S. Thayer was sunk by U-307 at 73°46′N 19°10′E, she would be the only allied ship lost in the convoy. For the next three days, Swordfish from 842 squadron, flying from Fencer, would sink one U-boat a day. On 1 May, U-277 was sunk at 73°24′N 15°32′E by depth charges, on 2 May, U-674 was sunk at 70°32′N 04°37′E by rockets, and on 3 May, U-959 was sunk at 69°20′N 00°20′W by depth charges. The convoy arrived at Loch Ewe, on 6 May.

Fencer was assigned to the East Indies Fleet in late October 1944. She departed Greenock, with her sister ship Striker, for Ceylon, present day Sri Lanka, with the DeHavilland Mosquito fighter bombers of 618 squadron on their decks. After stops at Gibraltar, Port Said, and transit through the Suez Canal, she arrived at Trincomalee Harbour. On 23 December 1944, the escort carriers arrived in Melbourne.

She was converted to trooping duties at the Selborne dry dock at Simon's Town, South Africa, from 9–11 July 1944. Fencer was then tasked with ferrying civilian and military personnel to Mombassa, then Ceylon, and then the UK.

== Decommissioning ==
Following World War II, she returned to the USN, 11 December 1946, stricken for disposal on 28 January 1947, and sold into merchant service 30 December 1947.

== Civilian service ==
Fencer, along with the Ruler-class Atheling, was sold to the Italian businessman Achille Lauro, for conversion to passenger ships for the Italy-Australia service. Fencer was moved to Jacksonville, Florida, for stripping before being sent to SA Navalmeccanica Cantieri, where she was converted and renamed Sydney. She had accommodations for 92 first class passengers and 666 tourist class passengers, with an increase to 14,708 GRT.

During the winter of 1958–1959, Sydney was modernized at Genoa, which increased her first class capacity to 119 and her tourist class capacity to 994. She was renamed Roma in 1968, after Roma, ex-Atheling, was scrapped. She was laid up in La Spezia, in October 1970, and sold in December 1970, to joint owners Cosmos Tours and Sovereign Cruises, Cyprus, and renamed Galaxy Queen. Her registry was moved to Greece, in 1973, and renamed Lady Tina, before being sold and renamed Caribia 2. In September 1974, Caribia 2 arrived at La Spezia, to await scrapping. She was sold in September 1975, for breaking.

== FAA squadrons ==
Fleet Air Arm Squadrons stationed on Fencer
Squadron	Dates	Aircraft type
700W	September 1943 – November 1943	Fairey Swordfish Mks.II
842	August 1943 - August 1944	Fairey Swordfish Mks.II/Supermarine Seafire L.I/II
842Q	November 1943 - November 1944	Grumman Wildcat Mk.V
850 det	September 1944 - October 1944	Grumman Wildcat Mk.V
852 det	September 1944 - October 1944	Grumman Wildcat Mk.VI
881	June 1944	Grumman Wildcat Mk.V

== Bibliography ==
- Gerhardt, Frank A. "USS Croatan". United States Maritime Commission 1936 thru 1950.
- "Seaplane and Aircraft Carriers". Fleet Air Arm Officers Association.
- "A History of HMS Attacker". Royal Navy Research Archive. 11 June 2020.
- "Croatan". DANFS. Navy Department, Naval History and Heritage Command. 27 April 2016. This article incorporates text from this source, which is in the public domain.
- Helgason, Guðmundur. "U-277".
- Helgason, Guðmundur. "U-674".
- Helgason, Guðmundur. "U-959".
- Cocker, Maurice (2008). Aircraft-Carrying Ships of the Royal Navy. Stroud, Gloucestershire: The History Press. ISBN 978-0-7524-4633-2.
- Morison, Samuel (2002). History of United States Naval Operations in World War II. Urbana, Illinois: University of Illinois Press. ISBN 978-0-252-07062-4.
- Plowman, Peter (2006). Australian Migrant Ships 1946-1977. Kenthurst New South Wales: Rosenberg Publishing. ISBN 978-1-877058-40-0.
- Poolman, Kenneth (1972). Escort Carrier 1941–1945. London: Ian Allan. ISBN 0-7110-0273-8.
- Sturtivant, R.; Ballance, T. (1994). The Squadrons of The Fleet Air Arm. Tonbridge, Kent, UK: Air-Britain (Historians) Ltd. ISBN 0-85130-223-8.
