= 8th Naval TBR Wing =

Royal Navy Fleet Air Arm aircraft wing

- White Ensign
- Active: 25 October 1943 – 3 October 1944
- Country: United Kingdom
- Branch: Royal Navy
- Type: Naval TBR Wing
- Role: Carrier-based Torpedo, bomber and reconnaissance
- Size: Two squadrons
- Part of: Fleet Air Arm
- Home station: RNAS Hatston
- Engagements: World War II: European theatre of World War II; Operation Tungsten; Operation Croquet; Operation Lombard; Operation Mascot; Operation Goodwood

Commanders
- Notable commanders: Lieutenant Commander R.S. Baker-Falkner, DSC, RN; Lieutenant Commander R.D. Kingdon, RNVR•

Aircraft flown
- Bomber: Fairey Barracuda

8th Naval TBR Wing ("8 Wing") was a Fleet Air Arm torpedo bomber reconnaissance formation of the Royal Navy during the Second World War. Formed on 25 October 1943 for HMS Furious, it comprised 827 and 830 Naval Air Squadrons, both equipped with Fairey Barracuda torpedo and dive bomber aircraft. Its headquarters was at RNAS Hatston in the Orkney Islands, while the squadrons worked with HMS Furious and the Home Fleet.

The Wing operated principally in Norwegian waters, where its Fairey Barracudas attacked German shipping and participated in attacks on the German battleship Tirpitz. Its most prominent operation was Operation Tungsten on 3 April 1944, when 827 and 830 Squadrons formed the 8 Wing component of the strike force against Tirpitz at Kåfjord. The squadrons subsequently participated in further operations against German shipping and Tirpitz, including Operation Mascot in July and Operation Goodwood in August 1944.

== History ==
=== Formation ===
The 8th Naval TBR Wing was formed on 25 October 1943 with 827 and 830 Naval Air Squadrons. Both squadrons operated the Fairey Barracuda Mk II, a British torpedo and dive bomber. The formation was established for HMS Furious and its headquarters was at RNAS Hatston, Mainland, Orkney, where the squadrons worked up and trained for operations with the Home Fleet.

By early 1944 the wing was being employed by the Home Fleet in a programme of attacks against German shipping along the Norwegian coast, while also preparing for attacks against the German battleship Tirpitz. The Fairey Barracuda crews undertook intensive training for the forthcoming battleship attack, alongside anti-shipping operations in Norwegian waters.

=== Operations off Norway ===
In February 1944, ten Fairey Barracudas from HMS Furious attacked a beached transport at Stadlandet. German fighters, including Messerschmitt Bf 109s and Focke-Wulf Fw 190s, intercepted the aircraft, but the Fairey Barracudas returned without loss. The operation formed part of the Home Fleet's developing programme of attacks against German shipping in Norwegian waters.

Preparation for the attack on Tirpitz was conducted at Loch Eriboll in northern Scotland. A practice range was constructed with smoke generators, dummy anti-aircraft positions and a representation of the battleship, allowing the Barracuda crews to rehearse the approach and attack. A full-scale rehearsal was carried out on 28 March 1944.

=== Operation Tungsten ===
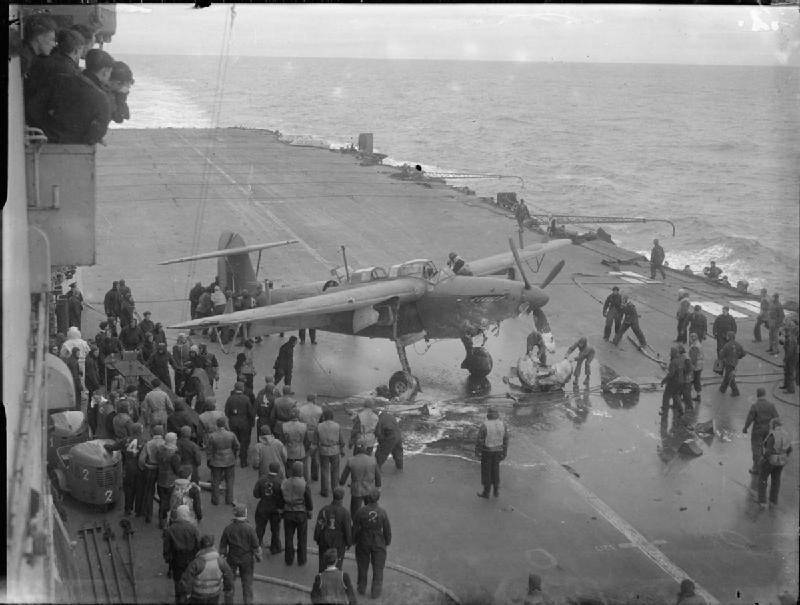
A Fairey Barracuda on fire from enemy flak having just landed on board HMS Furious

Operation Tungsten was mounted against the Tirpitz at Kåfjord on 3 April 1944. The striking force included two Faoirey Barracuda TBR wings: 8 Wing, comprising 827 and 830 Squadrons, and 52 Wing, comprising 829 and 831 Naval Air Squadrons. For the operation, 827 Squadron operated from HMS Victorious, while 830 Squadron operated from HMS Furious.

The first wave of Fairey Barracudas from 827 and 830 Squadrons attacked Tirpitz shortly after 05:00. The 8 Wing force was led by Lieutenant Commander R. S. Baker-Falkner, its Wing Leader. The aircraft approached at low level before climbing for the attack and then dive-bombed the battleship. The attack caused extensive damage to Tirpitz, although the battleship remained operational.

=== Continuing operations in Norwegian waters ===
During the latter part of April, 827 and 830 Squadrons continued to operate in the Home Fleet's Norwegian operations, with the squadrons employed from different carriers. 827 Squadron operated from HMS Victorious, while 830 Squadron operated from HMS Furious.

Operation Croquet followed in early May. Fairey Barracudas from HMS Furious, including 830 Squadron, attacked shipping off the Norwegian coast, escorted by aircraft from HMS Searcher. Two southbound convoys were attacked on 6 May; one merchant vessel was sunk and two others probably sank, while an escort vessel was hit.

Further attacks were planned in May. Operation Brawn was intended as a repeat of Operation Tungsten, while Operation Proteus was intended to repeat the reconnaissance mission, Operation Veritas. The force sailed from Scapa Flow on 12 May, but deteriorating weather prevented the planned attacks. On 15 May the Fairey Barracuda strike was launched, but thick cloud covered the target and the aircraft returned without attacking; Operation Brawn and subsequently Operation Proteus were abandoned.

Operations Tiger Claw and Cambridge were subsequently planned for late May, but were abandoned because of weather. The Home Fleet then carried out Operation Lombard against German shipping in the Ålesund area. On 1 June, ten Fairey Barracudas of 830 Squadron from HMS Furious, together with six Fairey Barracudas of 831 Squadron from HMS Victorious, attacked a three-ship convoy. All three merchant ships were hit and the escorting flak ships were also attacked; two merchant ships and one escort vessel were subsequently believed to have sunk.

=== Operation Mascot ===
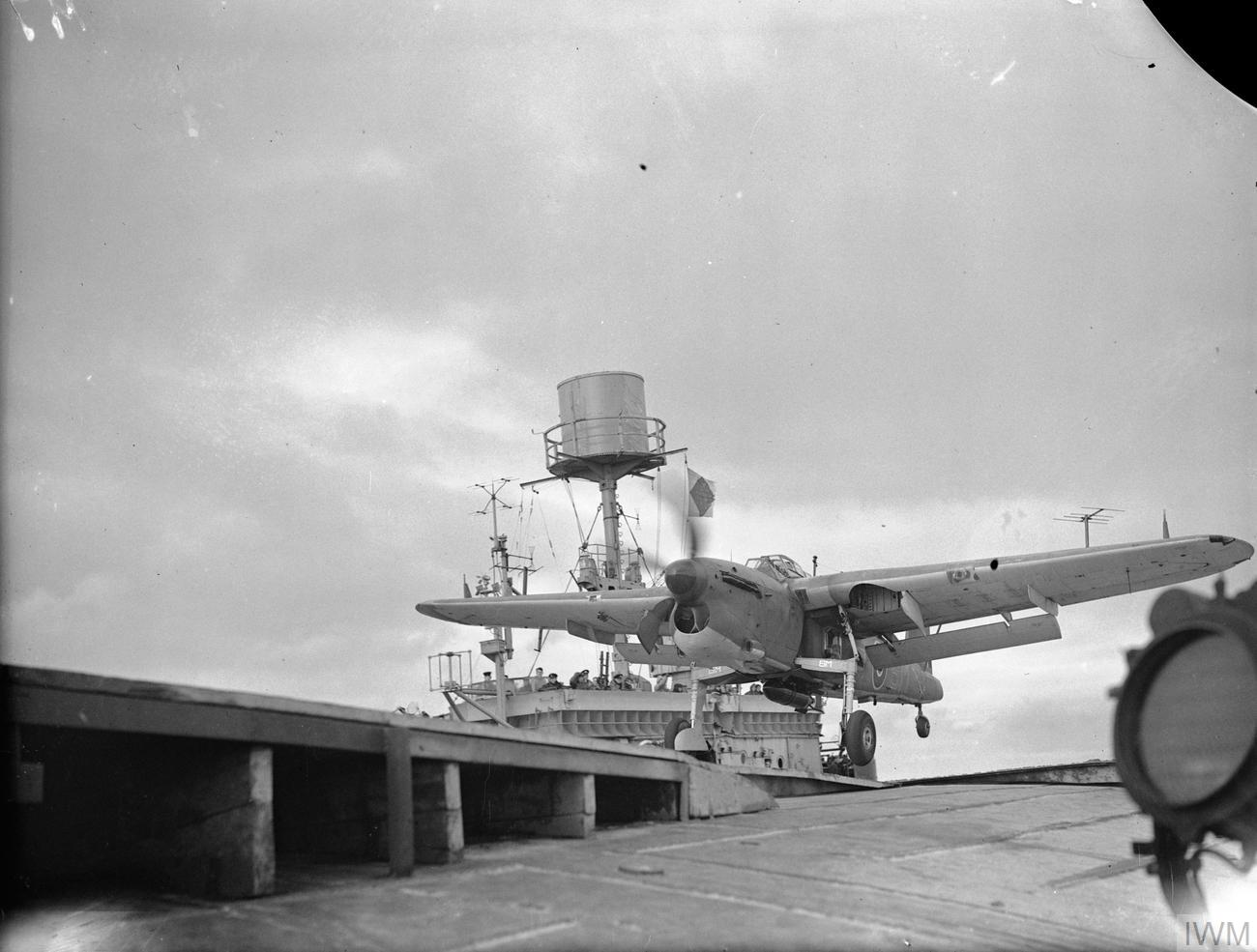
830 Squadron Fairey Barracuda taking off from HMS Furious at the start of Operation Mascot

In July 1944, 827 and 830 Squadrons were embarked together in HMS Formidable for Operation Mascot, accompanied by 1841 Naval Air Squadron's Vought Corsairs. HMS Indefatigable carried 820 and 826 Squadrons, while HMS Furious carried fighter and anti-submarine aircraft rather than the 8 Wing Fairey Barracudas.

The attack was launched on 17 July. A German smoke screen obscured the Tirpitz and prevented the Fairey Barracudas from obtaining a clear view of the battleship. The attack consequently failed to inflict significant damage. Baker-Falkner led the 8 Wing Barracuda force.

On the return from Operation Mascot, Baker-Falkner volunteered for an anti-submarine patrol from HMS Formidable. He failed to return from the patrol on 18 July 1944 and was subsequently reported missing, presumed killed.

Lieutenant Commander R.D. Kingdon, RN, succeeded Baker-Falkner as Wing Leader following Baker-Falkner's loss. Kingdon had previously commanded 830 Naval Air Squadron.

=== Operation Goodwood ===
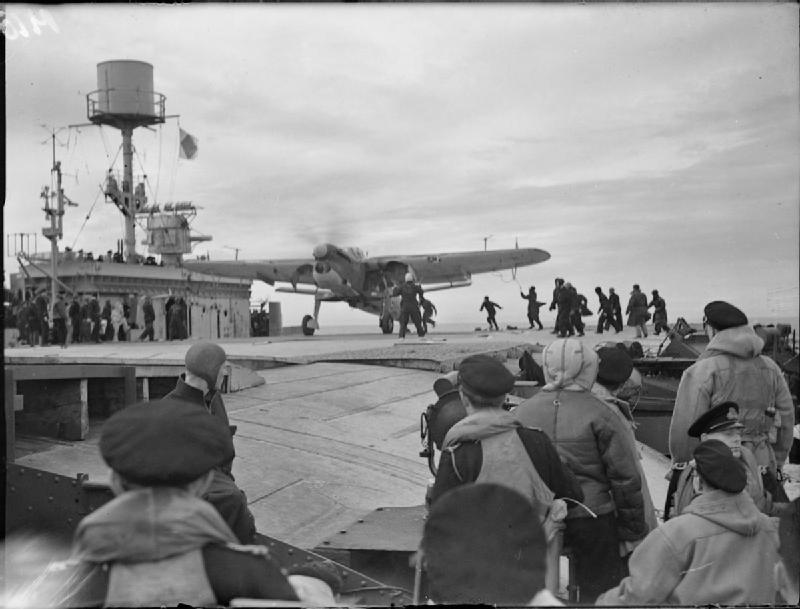
A Fairey Barracuda of 827 Squadron, returns to HMS Furious during Operation Goodwood

Operation Goodwood was mounted in August 1944 as a further series of attacks on the Tirpitz. By this stage, the two squadrons were no longer operating together as an embarked wing. 827 Squadron operated from HMS Furious during Operation Goodwood, while HMS Formidable operated with 826 and 828 Squadrons.

The Goodwood attacks were conducted between 22 and 29 August. Aircraft from the Home Fleet carriers attacked Tirpitz on several occasions, but German smoke screens again prevented an effective attack. 827 Squadron's Fairey Barracudas operated from HMS Furious during the attacks.

=== Disbandment ===
The wing ceased to exist at RNAS Hatston on 3 October 1944, when 830 Naval Air Squadron was absorbed into 827 Naval Air Squadron. Wragg gives 3 October as the date on which 830 Squadron was disbanded into 827 Squadron and separately records the same date for the disbandment of 8 Wing; Ballance, Howard and Sturtivant record the wing's disappearance in October.

== Squadrons ==
2nd Naval TBR Wing consisted of two Fleet Air Arm fighter squadrons during its existence:

- 827 Naval Air Squadron, (1943 - 1944)
- 830 Naval Air Squadron, (1943 - 1944)

== Naval air stations and carrier deployments ==
The Wing operated from a series of Royal Naval Air Stations and carriers during its service with the Home Fleet.

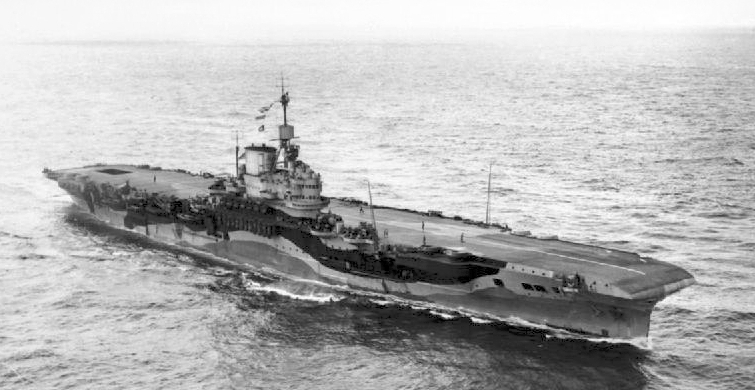
HMS Formidable

- Royal Naval Air Station Hatston (HMS Sparrowhawk), Mainland, Orkney.
  - October 1943 – October 1944: Headquarters of 8th Naval TBR Wing and the principal shore base of its squadrons.
- HMS Furious.
  - October 1943 – 1944: The wing was formed for HMS Furious and the carrier provided the principal operational base for 827 and 830 Squadrons during the Norwegian campaign.
- HMS Victorious.
  - March–April 1944: 827 Squadron operated from HMS Victorious during Operation Tungsten, while 830 Squadron operated from HMS Furious.
- HMS Furious and HMS Victorious.
  - April–June 1944: The squadrons were employed separately during the Home Fleet's Norwegian operations, including Operation Planet, Operation Ridge, Operation Veritas, Operation Croquet, Operation Brawn, Operation Tiger Claw and Operation Lombard.
- HMS Formidable.
  - July 1944: 827 and 830 Squadrons were embarked together for Operation Mascot and the 17 July attack on Tirpitz.
- HMS Furious.
  - August 1944: 827 Squadron operated from HMS Furious during Operation Goodwood, while HMS Formidable had by then embarked 826 and 828 Squadrons.
- Royal Naval Air Station Hatston (HMS Sparrowhawk), Mainland, Orkney.
  - October 1944: 830 Squadron was absorbed into 827 Squadron on 3 October, ending the wing's existence.

== Aircraft ==
The wing's two constituent squadrons operated with one type of torpedo bomber aircraft:

- Fairey Barracuda Mk II torpedo and dive bomber (1943 - 1944)

== Wing leaders ==
The wing's recorded commanding officer chronology was:

- Lieutenant Commander R.S. Baker-Falkner, DSC, RN, from 25 October 1943. He was Wing Leader during Operation Tungsten and Operation Mascot and was lost on an anti-submarine patrol on 18 July 1944.
- Lieutenant Commander R.D. Kingdon, DSC, RNVR, from July3 October 1944. Kingdon had previously commanded 830 Naval Air Squadron and succeeded Baker-Falkner as Wing Leader.

== See also ==
- Fleet Air Arm
- List of aircraft wings of the Royal Navy
- 827 Naval Air Squadron
- 830 Naval Air Squadron
- HMS Furious
- HMS Victorious
- HMS Formidable
- Home Fleet
