= 827 Naval Air Squadron =

Inactive flying squadron of the Royal Navy's Fleet Air Arm

- Squadron badge
- Active: 1940–1946; 1946–1950; 1950–1952; 1954–1955
- Disbanded: 22 November 1955
- Country: United Kingdom
- Branch: Royal Navy
- Type: Torpedo Bomber Reconnaissance squadron
- Role: Carrier-based: anti-submarine warfare (ASW); anti-surface warfare (ASuW); Air interdiction (AI)
- Size: Squadron
- Part of: Fleet Air Arm
- Home station: See Naval air stations section for full list.
- Mottos: Ya-mansur-amit (Arabic for 'O! Conqueror fight desperately')
- Engagements: World War II: Operation EF (1941); Indian Ocean in World War II; Operation Ironclad; Operation Pedestal; Operation Tungsten; Operation Mascot; Operation Goodwood; Korean War: Operation Chromite
- Battle honours: Diego Suarez 1942; Malta Convoys 1942; Norway 1944; Korea 1950

Commanders
- Notable commanders: Lieutenant Commander(A) Roy Baker-Falkner, DSC, RN

Insignia
- Squadron Badge Description: Per fess wavy white and barry wavy of six blue and white, a rod of Caduceus and a trident in satire gold in chief a winged cap red (1944)
- Identification Markings: 4A+ (Albacore on HMS Victorious); 5A+ (Albacore on HMS Indomitable October 1941); 4A+ (Barracuda); U1A+ (Barracuda April 1945); A1A+ (Barracuda later); 370-379 (Barracuda September 1945); single letters (Firefly); 271-282 (Firefly later); 212-215 (Black Flight); 279-282 (Black Flight August 1949); 120-129 (Firebrand); 131-139 (Wyvern)
- Fin Carrier/Shore Codes: D:C (Barracuda September 1945); P (Firefly); J:FD (Firebrand); J (Wyvern)

Aircraft flown
- Attack: Blackburn Firebrand; Westland Wyvern
- Bomber: Fairey Albacore; Fairey Barracuda
- Fighter: Fairey Firefly

827 Naval Air Squadron (827 NAS), also known as 827 Squadron, is an inactive Fleet Air Arm (FAA) naval air squadron of the United Kingdom’s Royal Navy (RN). It was last operational between 1954 and 1955 operating with Westland Wyvern S.4 strike fighter, based at RNAS Ford (HMS Peregrine), Sussex.

827 Naval Air Squadron was established in September 1940, as a Torpedo Spotter Reconnaissance (TSR) unit at HMS Heron, RNAS Yeovilton. It trained at HMS Jackdaw, RNAS Crail, before joining RAF Coastal Command for convoy protection and minelaying from RAF Thorney Island and RAF St Eval. In June 1941, it moved north to HMS Landrail, RNAS Machrihanish and HMS Merlin, RNAS Donibristle, to attack the battlecruisers Scharnhorst and Gneisenau. In July, the squadron embarked HMS Victorious for a raid on Kirkenes, during which it lost half of its Fairey Albacores, but managed to shoot down a Ju87.

In October 1941, the squadron re-assembled and embarked in HMS Indomitable for a journey that took them to the United States and Jamaica before proceeding around the Cape of Good Hope to Aden Colony. Utilising both the carrier and various airbases, the squadron conducted anti-submarine patrols in the Red Sea and Indian Ocean. In May 1942, it participated in the invasion of Madagascar. Subsequently, the ship sailed to Gibraltar in preparation for Operation Pedestal, the Malta convoy in August, during which the squadron suffered the loss of five officers due to attacks on the carrier.

In May 1943, it became the first FAA squadron to receive a Fairey Barracuda in any substantial number. It later became part of the 8th Naval TBR Wing, aboard HMS Furious with HMS Sparrowhawk, RNAS Hatston, as an airbase. The squadron transferred for one of two spells aboard HMS Victorious and was led by Strike leader Roy Sydney Baker-Falkner in the attack on the German battleship Tirpitz in Operation Tungsten on 3 April 1944. During the dive bombing attack, ten hits were recorded in conjunction with the 830 Naval Air Squadron. A subsequent assault on the battleship Tirpitz occurred in July from HMS Formidable, where a smokescreen provided effective cover for the battleship. However, in August, two successful hits were achieved while operating from HMS Furious.

The squadron relocated to RAF Beccles and RAF Langham to collaborate with No. 16 Group, RAF Coastal Command, along the Dutch coastline. In January 1945, it boarded HMS Colossus with plans to join the British Pacific Fleet. Upon reaching Ceylon, the squadron disembarked and became part of the 14th Carrier Air Group but remained on land until the conclusion of the war.

Post-war it initially operated the Blackburn Firebrand strike fighter, until 1954.

== History ==
=== Torpedo, spotter, reconnaissance squadron (1940–1946) ===
827 Naval Air Squadron was established RNAS Yeovilton (HMS Heron) in Somerset on 15 September 1940, functioning as a Torpedo Spotter Reconnaissance (TSR) unit and initially equipped with twelve Fairey Albacore aircraft, a biplane torpedo bomber.

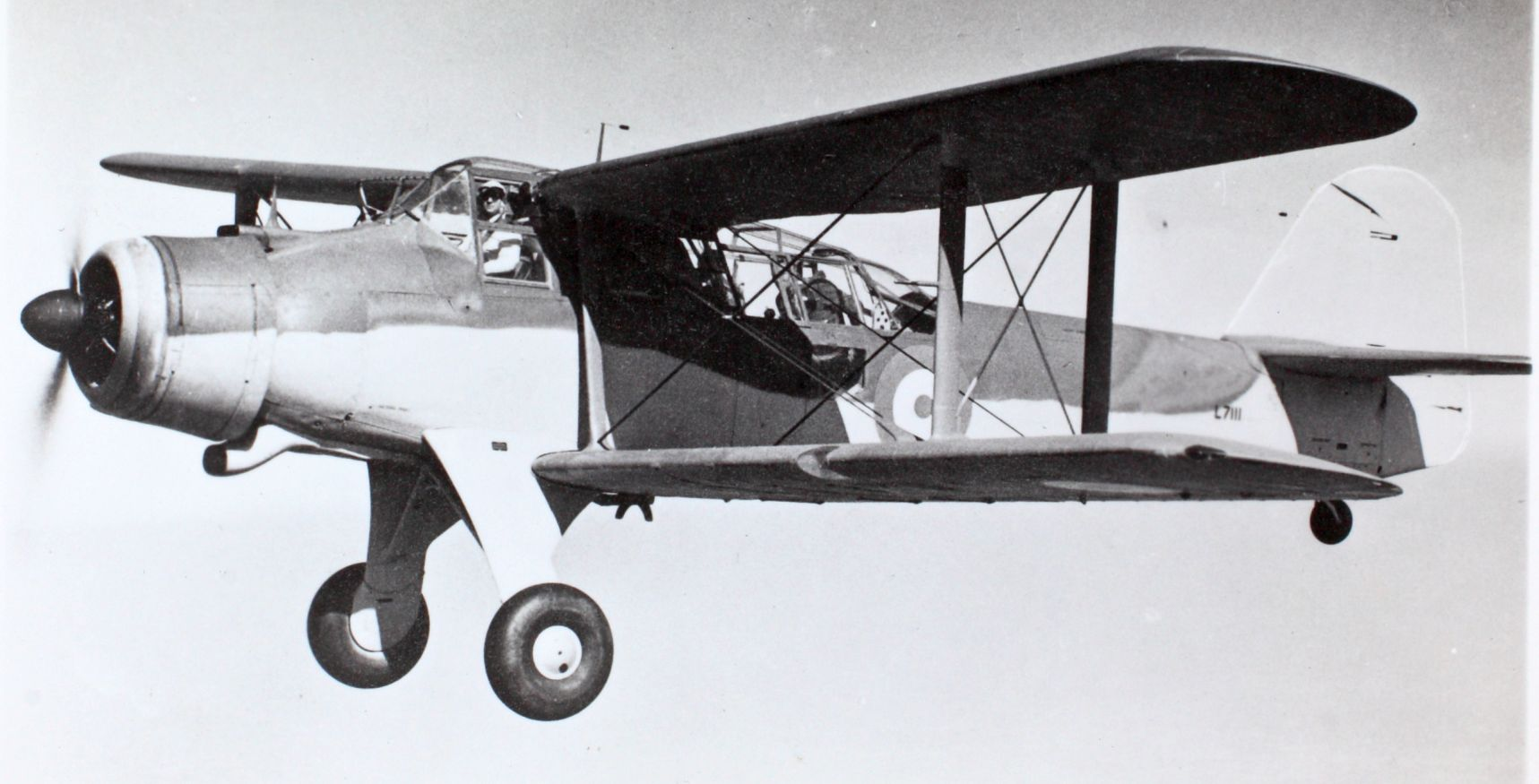
Fairey Albacore; an example of the type used by 827 Squadron

Subsequent to work-up at RNAS Crail (HMS Jackdaw), Fife, in Scotland, the unit conducted anti-submarine patrols and provided convoy escorts from RAF Stornoway, Isle of Lewis, Outer Hebrides, under the auspices of RAF Coastal Command. In May 1941, they relocated southward to prepare for assaults on the Kriegsmarine battle cruisers Scharnhorst and Gneisenau, during which time they executed seven nocturnal mine-laying missions off the coasts of Brest and Cherbourg, France.

On 2 July, the squadron embarked in the Illustrious-class aircraft carrier HMS Victorious, to execute an assault on Kirkenes harbour in northern Norway on the 30th, resulting in the loss of six aircraft; however, one pilot successfully downed a Junkers Ju 87 dive-bomber, using the forward-mounted gun.

In August 1941, the squadron consolidated at RNAS Hatston (HMS Sparrowhawk), Mainland, Orkney, and it embarked in the Illustrious-class aircraft carrier HMS Indomitable, in October on a journey to the USA and Jamaica, subsequently proceeding around the Cape to Aden, where it arrived in January 1942. Utilising the carrier along with several shore bases, 827 Naval Air Squadron conducted anti-submarine patrols in both the Red Sea and the Indian Ocean. The squadron participated in the invasion of Madagascar in May 1942, albeit with only nine aircraft operational.

The carrier departed for Gibraltar, once more navigating around the Cape. A detachment of four aircraft was deployed from HMS Indomitable to the RN Air Section at the South African Air Force Station Stamford Hill, Durban, South Africa, between 13 and 18 July 1942. In August 1942, during Operation Pedestal, a rapid reinforcement convoy to Malta, five squadron officers lost their lives due to assaults on the ship. Following provisional repairs, HMS Indomitable made its way back home, allowing 827 Naval Air Squadron personnel to disembark for regrouping.

In January 1943, 827 Naval Air Squadron was re-equipped at RNAS Stretton (HMS Blackcap), Cheshire, with twelve Fairey Barracuda Mk II torpedo bomber aircraft, which decreased to nine aircraft by September. The squadron became part of the 8th Naval TBR (Torpedo, Bomber and Reconnaissance) Wing in October, serving with the Home Fleet aboard HMS Furious, the Courageous-class battlecruiser modified as an aircraft carrier. In March 1944, it was temporarily assigned to HMS Victorious, where it participated in a successful dive-bombing mission against the battleship Tirpitz on 3 April, achieving ten hits in collaboration with 830 Naval Air Squadron.

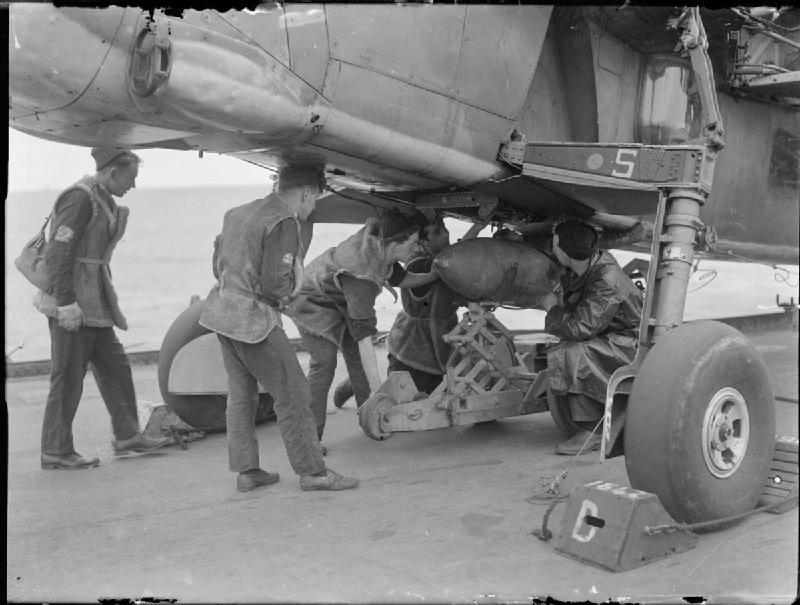
Fairey Barracuda of 827 Squadron being armed for a raid on the German battleship Tirpitz during Operation Goodwood

Anti-shipping operations conducted from HMS Furious off the coast of Norway during April and May of 1944 occurred despite extremely harsh weather conditions. A subsequent assault on the Tirpitz took place in July 1944, launched from the Illustrious-class aircraft carrier, HMS Formidable, where a smokescreen provided protection for the vessel; however, two successful strikes were achieved during an operation from HMS Furious in August 1944.

In October 1944, the squadron integrated 830 Naval Air Squadron, increasing its fleet to eighteen aircraft. It subsequently relocated to RAF Beccles, Suffolk and RAF Langham, Norfolk, to collaborate with the No. 16 Group of RAF Coastal Command over the Dutch coastline. In January 1945, the squadron boarded the Colossus-class light aircraft carrier HMS Colossus, aiming to join the British Pacific Fleet. However, during its journey, the number of aircraft was reduced to twelve at RNAS Dekheila (HMS Grebe) in Alexandria, Egypt. Upon reaching Ceylon, the squadron disembarked and became part of the 14th Carrier Air Group, remaining on land until the end of the Second World War.

The carrier remained in the Far East until December and after a prolonged stay in Cape Town, South Africa, where the squadron's Fairey Barracuda disembarked to RNAS Wingfield (HMS Malagas) between 17 January and 18 April, it then set sail for the United Kingdom, where the squadron was officially disbanded at RNAS Lee-on-Solent (HMS Daedalus) in Hampshire on 24 July 1946.

=== Fighter reconnaissance squadron (1946–1950) ===
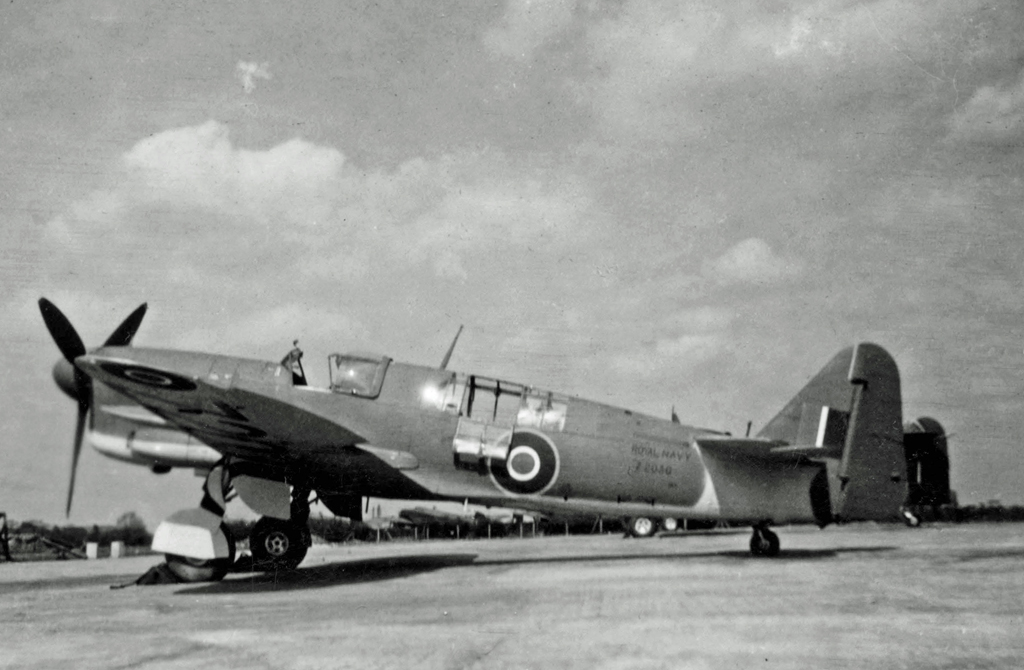
Fairey Firefly FR.1; an example of the type used by 827 Squadron

On 15 August 1946, 827 Naval Air Squadron was re-established at RNAS Eglinton (HMS Gannet) in County Londonderry, Northern Ireland, as a fighter reconnaissance squadron equipped with twelve Fairey Firefly FR. I aircraft, a British carrier-borne fighter and aerial reconnaissance aircraft. By October, the squadron had integrated into the 13th Carrier Air Group, which deployed aboard the Colossus-class aircraft carrier HMS Triumph, in January, for a two-year mission in the Mediterranean, operating primarily from Malta. In July 1948, alongside 800 Naval Air Squadron, a detachment from 827 Naval Air Squadron undertook a five-day tour to showcase naval presence in Turkey, visiting Etimesgut, Eskişehir, and Istanbul, before re-joining the carrier near İzmir.

In March 1949, the squadron returned home and received twelve new Fairey Firefly FR.I aircraft, which were deployed to the Mediterranean the following month. In June 1949, four Fairey Firefly NF.MK I, "night fighter" variant, from the Night Fighter Unit of 812 Naval Air Squadron were integrated as Black Flight. This unit was fully incorporated into the squadron by August, coinciding with the squadron's deployment to the Far East, while the flight personnel returned to Malta in November.

Operations supporting the Army commenced in October against Malayan bandits. On 21 October, one of the most significant air strikes occurred near Gemas in Negri Sembilan, involving a total of sixty-two sorties. This operation featured a diverse array of aircraft, including Supermarine Spitfires, Bristol Beaufighters, Hawker Tempests, and Short Sunderlands from the Royal Air Force, alongside Fairey Fireflies and Supermarine Seafires from 827 and 800 Naval Air Squadrons.

When the Korean War erupted in June 1950, 827 Naval Air Squadron deployed with twelve Fairey Firefly FR.1 fighter / reconnaissance aircraft to conduct anti-submarine patrols, assist with the landings at Inchon, provide bombardment spotting, and engage shore targets. In September, the ship returned home via Singapore and 827 Naval Air Squadron was officially disbanded at RNAS Ford (HMS Peregrine), Sussex, on 22 November.

=== Single-seat torpedo strike squadron (1950–1952) ===
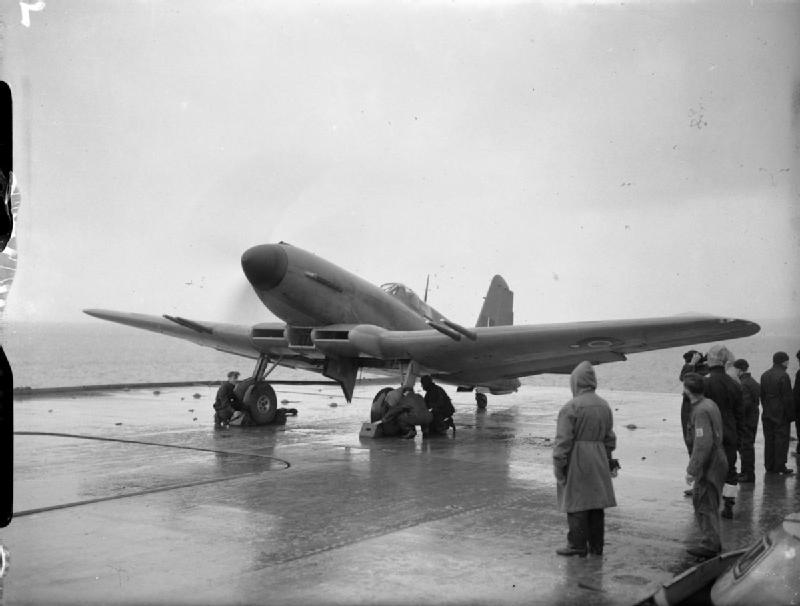
Blackburn Firebrand on HMS Illustrious

827 Naval Air Squadron was reformed at RNAS Ford, in December 1950 as a single-seater torpedo strike squadron, equipped with twelve Blackburn Firebrand TF.5 strike fighter aircraft, making it one of only two front-line squadrons to utilise this model.

Although the concept did not achieve significant success, the squadron deployed to Malta in May 1951 and joined the lead ship of her class of aircraft carrier, HMS Illustrious, in October for its return to the United Kingdom. In June 1952, the squadron embarked in the Audacious-class aircraft carrier HMS Eagle for a summer cruise and later participated in a NATO exercise off the coast of Norway in September. Following Arctic trials conducted by the ship in November, the squadron was disbanded once more upon its return to RNAS Ford in December.

=== Wyvern S.4 (1954–1955) ===
In November 1954, 827 Naval Air Squadron was re-established again at RNAS Ford, originating from the core of 703W Flight and was equipped with nine Westland Wyvern S.4 strike fighter aircraft designated for torpedo strike operations. The squadron embarked in HMS Eagle in May 1955 and engaged in joint exercises with the US Navy in the Mediterranean in June. In September, they participated in a NATO exercise off the coast of Norway. Following another exercise in the Moray Firth in October, the squadron returned to RNAS Ford on 19 November and was subsequently disbanded.

== Aircraft flown ==
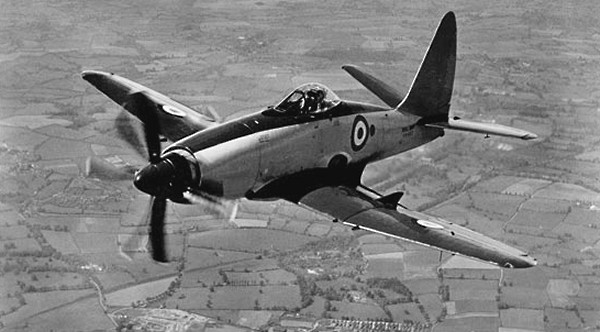
Westland Wyvern S.4

The squadron has flown a number of different aircraft types, including:

- Fairey Albacore torpedo bomber (September 1940 - January 1943)
- Fairey Barracuda Mk I torpedo and dive bomber (January - July 1943)
- Fairey Barracuda Mk II torpedo and dive bomber (March 1943 - July 1946)
- Fairey Firefly FR.I Fighter/reconnaissance aircraft (August 1946 - November 1950, January - May 1952)
- Fairey Firefly NF.1 Night fighter (June 1949 - June 1950)
- Blackburn Firebrand TF.5 Strike fighter (December 1950 - December 1952)
- Westland Wyvern S.4 Strike aircraft (November 1954 - December 1955)

== Battle honours ==
The Battle Honours awarded to 827 Naval Air Squadron are:

- Diego Suarez 1942
- Malta Convoys 1942
- Norway 1944
- Korea 1950

== Assignments ==
827 Naval Air Squadron was assigned as needed to form part of a number of larger units:

- 8th Naval TBR Wing (25 October 1943 - 3 October 1944)
- 14th Carrier Air Group (30 June 1945 - 23 July 1946)
- 13th Carrier Air Group (1 October 1946 - 15 November 1950, August 1951 - 3 December 1952)

== Naval air stations ==
827 Naval Air Squadron operated mostly from a number of naval air stations of the Royal Navy and Royal Air Force stations in the UK and overseas and a number of Royal Navy fleet carriers:

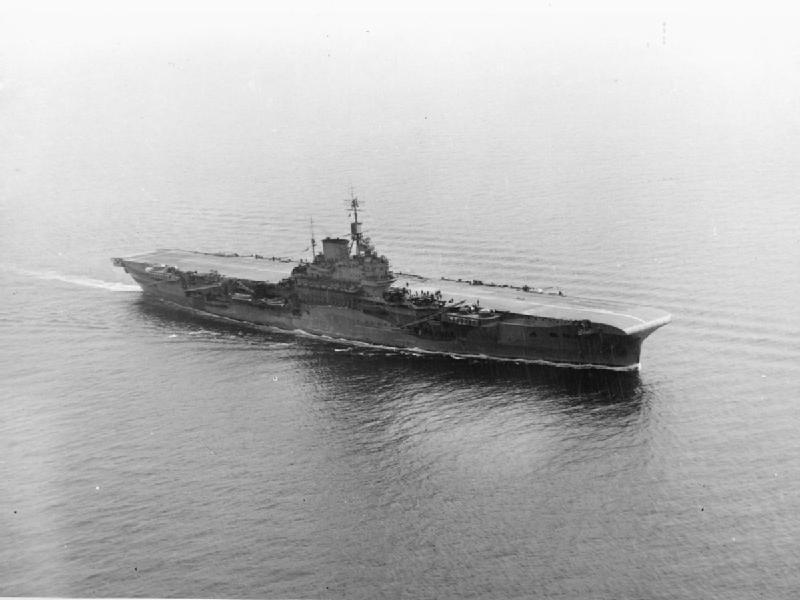
HMS Indomitable

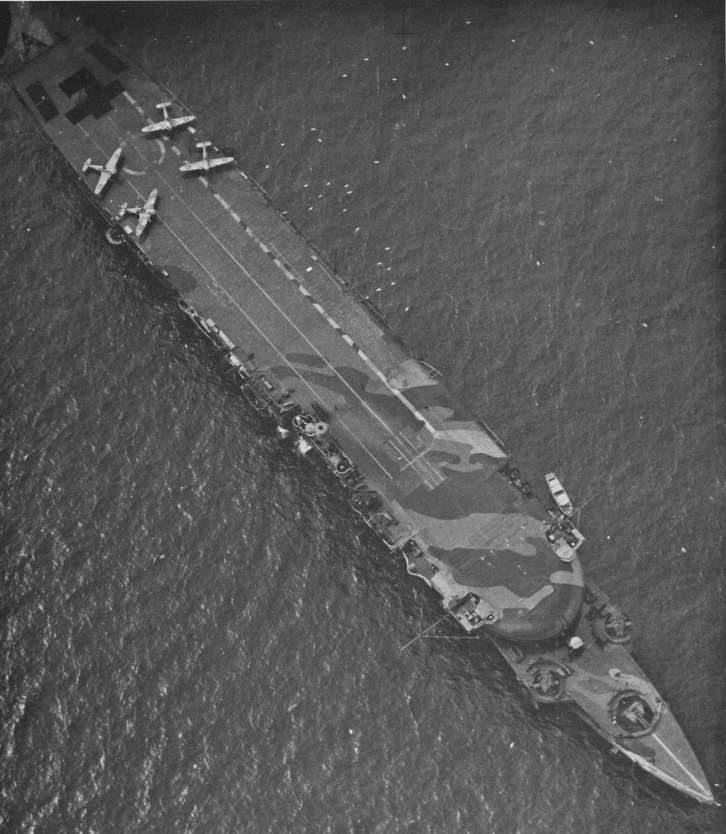
HMS Furious

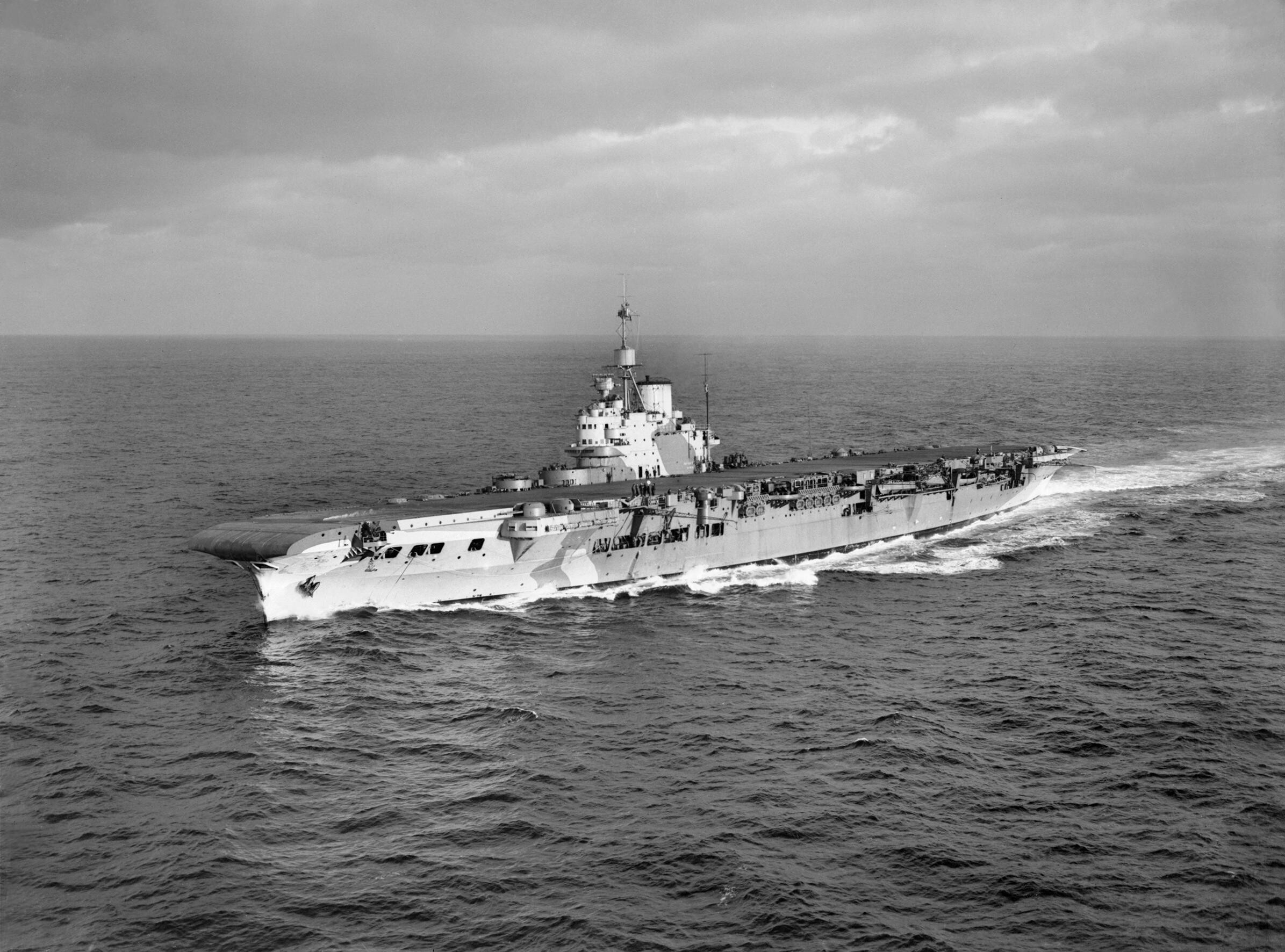
HMS Victorious

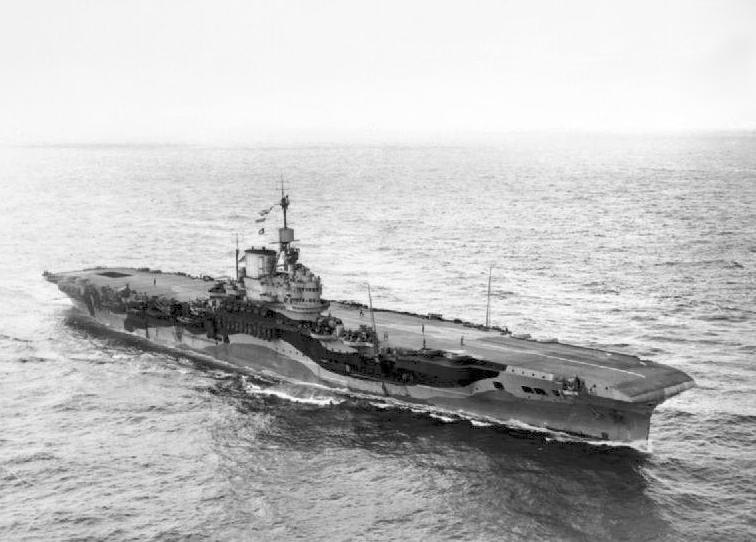
HMS Formidable

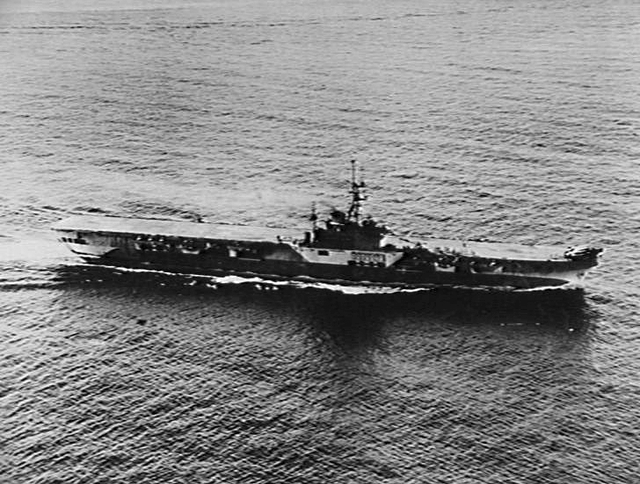
HMS Colossus

1940 - 1946

- Royal Naval Air Station Yeovilton (HMS Heron), Somerset, (15 September - 2 November 1940)
- Royal Naval Air Station Crail (HMS Jackdaw), Fife, (2 November 1940 - 14 March 1941)
  - HMS Argus (Deck Landing Training (DLT) 9 - 11 March 1941)
- Royal Air Force Stornoway, Isle of Lewis, Outer Hebrides, (18 Gp) (14 March - 1 May 1941)
- Royal Air Force Thorney Island, West Sussex, (1 - 14 May 1941)
- Royal Air Force St Eval, Cornwall, (14 May - 5 June 1941)
- Royal Naval Air Station Donibristle (HMS Merlin), Fife, (5 - 27 June 1941)
- Royal Naval Air Station Machrihanish (HMS Landrail), Argyll and Bute, (27 June - 1 July 1941)
- Royal Naval Air Station Hatston (HMS Sparrowhawk), Mainland, Orkney, (1 - 2 July 1941)
- HMS Victorious (2 July - 15 August 1941)
- Royal Naval Air Station Hatston (HMS Sparrowhawk), Mainland, Orkney, (15 August -10 October 1941)
- Royal Naval Air Station Machrihanish (HMS Landrail), Argyll and Bute, (10 - 13 October 1941)
- HMS Indomitable (13 October - 10 November 1941)
- RN Air Section Norfolk, Virginia, (10 - 22 November 1941)
- HMS Indomitable (22 November 1941 - 12 January 1942)
  - RN Air Section Wynberg, South Africa, (Detachment three aircraft 2 - 6 January 1942)
- Royal Air Force Khormaksar, Aden, (12 January - 23 February 1942)
- HMS Indomitable (23 February - 16 June 1942)
  - Royal Air Force Juhu, India, (Detachment 14 - 20 April 1942)
  - RN Air Sectrion Port Reitz, Kenya, (Detachment six aircraft 22 May - 10 June 1942)
- RN Air Section Port Reitz, Kenya, (16 June - 9 July 1942)
- HMS Indomitable (9 July - 28 August 1942)
  - RN Air Section Durban Stamford Hill, South Africa, (Detachment 13 - 18 July 1942)
- Royal Naval Air Station Machrihanish (HMS Landrail), Argyll and Bute, (28 August - 23 September 1942)
- Royal Naval Air Station Lee-on-Solent (HMS Daedalus), Hampshire, (23 September - 15 December 1942)
- Royal Naval Air Station Stretton (HMS Blackcap), Cheshire, (15 December - 12 February 1943)
- Royal Naval Air Station Machrihanish (HMS Landrail), Argyll and Bute, (12 February - 2 April 1943)
- Royal Naval Air Station Lee-on-Solent (HMS Daedalus), Hampshire, (2 - 24 April 1943)
- Royal Naval Air Station Dunino (HMS Jackdaw II), Fife, (24 April - 12 August 1943)
- Royal Naval Air Station Machrihanish (HMS Landrail), Argyll and Bute, (12 August - 11 October 1943)
- HMS Furious (11 October - 6 December 1943)
- Royal Naval Air Station Hatston (HMS Sparrowhawk), Mainland, Orkney, (6 - 10 December 1943)
- HMS Furious (10 - 14 December 1943)
- Royal Naval Air Station Hatston (HMS Sparrowhawk), Mainland, Orkney, (14 - 26 December 1943)
- HMS Furious (26 December 1943 - 3 January 1944)
- Royal Naval Air Station Hatston (HMS Sparrowhawk), Mainland, Orkney, (3 January - 8 February 1944)
- HMS Furious (8 - 14 February 1944)
- Royal Naval Air Station Hatston (HMS Sparrowhawk), Mainland, Orkney, (14 - 24 February 1944)
- HMS Furious (24 - 29 February 1944)
- Royal Naval Air Station Hatston (HMS Sparrowhawk), Mainland, Orkney, (29 February - 17 March 1944)
- HMS Furious (17 - 22 March 1944
- Royal Naval Air Station Hatston (HMS Sparrowhawk), Mainland, Orkney, (22 - 30 March 1944)
- HMS Victorious (30 March - 7 April 1944)
- Royal Naval Air Station Donibristle (HMS Merlin), Fife, (7 - 20 April 1944)
- HMS Victorious (20 - 28 April 1944)
- Royal Naval Air Station Hatston (HMS Sparrowhawk), Mainland, Orkney, (28 April - 3 May 1944)
- HMS Furious (3 - 18 May 1944)
- Royal Naval Air Station Hatston (HMS Sparrowhawk), Mainland, Orkney, (18 - 28 May 1944)
- HMS Furious (28 May - 17 June 1944)
- Royal Naval Air Station Hatston (HMS Sparrowhawk), Mainland, Orkney, (17 - 22 June 1944)
- HMS Furious (22 - 23 June 1944)
- Royal Naval Air Station Hatston (HMS Sparrowhawk), Mainland, Orkney, (23 June - 14 July 1944)
- HMS Formidable (14 - 19 July 1944)
- Royal Naval Air Station Hatston (HMS Sparrowhawk), Mainland, Orkney, (19 July - 11 September 1944)
  - HMS Furious (Detachment five aircraft 9 August - 9 September 1944)
- HMS Furious (11 - 13 September 1944)
- Royal Naval Air Station Hatston (HMS Sparrowhawk), Mainland, Orkney, (13 September - 11 October 1944)
- HMS Furious (11 - 15 October 1944)
- Royal Air Force Beccles, Suffolk, (16 Gp) (15 - 28 October 1944)
- Royal Air Force Langham, Norfolk, (16 Gp) (28 October - 14 December 1944)
- Royal Naval Air Station Machrihanish (HMS Landrail), Argyll and Bute, (14 December - 13 January 1945)
- HMS Colossus (13 - 28 January 1945)
  - Royal Naval Air Station Ballyhalbert, County Down, (Detachment 23 - 27 January 1945)
- Royal Naval Air Station Ballyhalbert, County Down, (28 January - 20 February 1945)
- HMS Colossus (20 February - 22 March 1945)
- Royal Naval Air Station Dekheila (HMS Grebe), Alexandria, Egypt, (22 March - 4 May 1945)
- HMS Colossus (4 May - 12 June 1945)
- Royal Naval Air Station Katukurunda (HMS Ukussa), Ceylon, (12 June - 3 July 1945)
- HMS Colossus (3 - 22 July 1945)
- Royal Naval Air Station Jervis Bay (HMS Nabswick), Jervis Bay Territory, (22 July - 13 August 1945)
- HMS Colossus (13 August - 26 October 1945)
  - Royal Naval Air Station Kai Tak (HMS Nabcatcher), Hong Kong, (Detachment six aircraft 15 - 18 OCtober 1945)
- Royal Naval Air Station Katukurunda (HMS Ukussa), Ceylon, (26 October - 30 December 1945)
- HMS Colossus (30 December 1945 - 17 January 1946)
- Royal Naval Air Station Wingfield (HMS Malagas), South Africa, (17 January - 8 April 1946)
- HMS Colossus (8 - 27 April 1946)
- Royal Naval Air Station Katukurunda (HMS Ukussa), Ceylon, (27 April - 17 May 1946)
- HMS Colossus (17 May - 22 July 1946)
- Royal Naval Air Station Lee-on-Solent (HMS Daedalus), Hampshire (22 - 24 July 1946)
- disbanded - (24 July 1946)

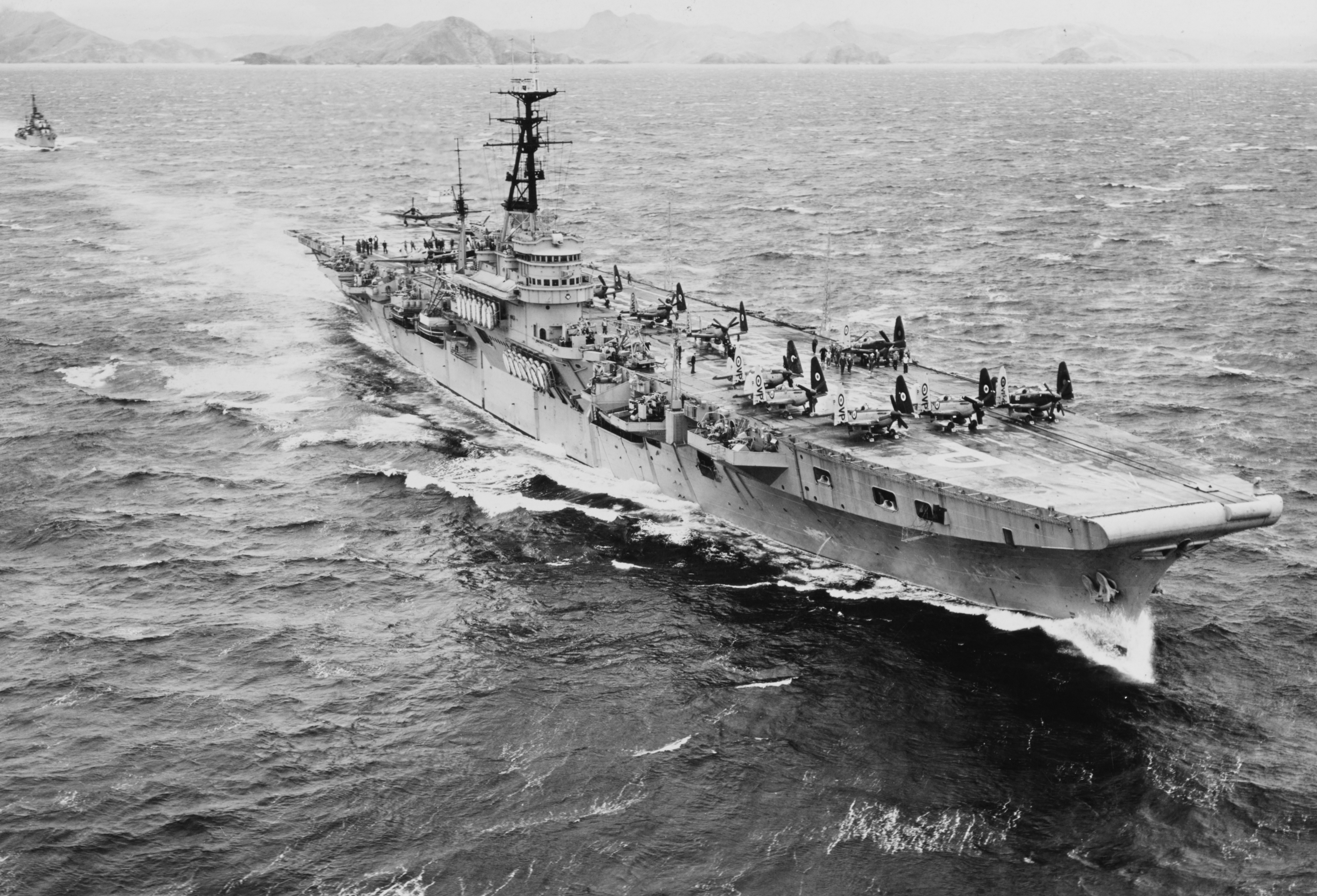
HMS Triumph

1946 - 1950

- Royal Naval Air Station Lee-on-Solent (HMS Daedalus), Hampshire, (15 August - 17 September 1946)
- Royal Naval Air Station Eglinton (HMS Gannet), County Londonderry, (17 September 1946 - 13 January 1947)
- HMS Triumph (13 January - 22 February 1947)
- Royal Naval Air Station Hal Far (HMS Falcon), Malta, (22 February - 10 March 1947)
- HMS Triumph (10 - 24 March 1947)
- Royal Naval Air Station Hal Far (HMS Falcon), Malta, (24 March - 14 April 1947)
- HMS Triumph (14 April - 15 May 1947)
- Royal Naval Air Station Hal Far (HMS Falcon), Malta, (15 May - 24 June 1947)
- HMS Triumph (24 June - 4 July 1947)
- Royal Naval Air Station Hal Far (HMS Falcon), Malta, (4 - 15 July 1947)
- HMS Triumph (15 July - 22 August 1947)
- Royal Naval Air Station Hal Far (HMS Falcon), Malta, (22 August - 15 September 1947)
- HMS Triumph (15 September - 16 October 1947)
- Royal Naval Air Station Hal Far (HMS Falcon), Malta, (16 October - 5 November 1947)
- Royal Air Force Castel Benito, Libya, (5 - 28 November 1947)
- Royal Naval Air Station Hal Far (HMS Falcon), Malta, (28 November - 16 December 1947)
- HMS Triumph (16 - 19 December 1947)
- Royal Naval Air Station Hal Far (HMS Falcon), Malta, (19 December 1947 - 12 January 1948)
- HMS Triumph (12 January - 21 April 1948)
- Royal Naval Air Station Hal Far (HMS Falcon), Malta, (21 April - 3 June 1948)
- HMS Triumph (3 June - 28 July 1948)
  - Turkey (Detachment five aircraft 6 - 10 July 1948)
- Royal Naval Air Station Hal Far (HMS Falcon), Malta, (28 July - 18 August 1948)
- HMS Triumph (18 August - 28 September 1948)
- Royal Naval Air Station Hal Far (HMS Falcon), Malta, (28 September - 12 October 1948)
- Royal Air Force Castel Benito, Libya, (12 - 16 October 1948)
- Royal Naval Air Station Hal Far (HMS Falcon), Malta, (16 October - 20 December 1948)
- HMS Triumph (20 December 1948 - 5 February 1949)
- Royal Naval Air Station Hal Far (HMS Falcon), Malta, (5 - 22 February 1949)
- HMS Triumph (22 February - 16 March 1949)
- Royal Naval Air Station Donibristle (HMS Merlin), Fife, (16 March - 25 April 1949)
- HMS Triumph (25 April - 6 May 1949)
- Royal Naval Air Station Hal Far (HMS Falcon), Malta, (6 May - 30 June 1949)
- HMS Triumph (30 June - 15 September 1949)
- RN Air Section Kai Tak, Hong Kong, (15 - 27 September 1949)
- HMS Triumph (27 September - 3 October 1949)
- Royal Naval Air Station Sembawang, Singapore, (3 October - 1 November 1949)
- HMS Triumph (1 - 5 November 1949)
- RN Air Section Kai Tak, Hong Kong, (5 November - 3 December 1949)
- HMS Triumph (3 -8 December 1949)
- Royal Naval Air Station Sembawang, Singapore, (8 December 1949 - 4 February 1950)
- HMS Triumph (4 February - 15 April 1950)
- RAAF Station Iwakuni, Japan, (15 April - 9 May 1950)
- HMS Triumph (9 May - 15 November 1950)
- Royal Naval Air Station Ford (HMS Peregrine), West Sussex, (15 - 22 November 1950)
- disbanded - (22 November 1950)

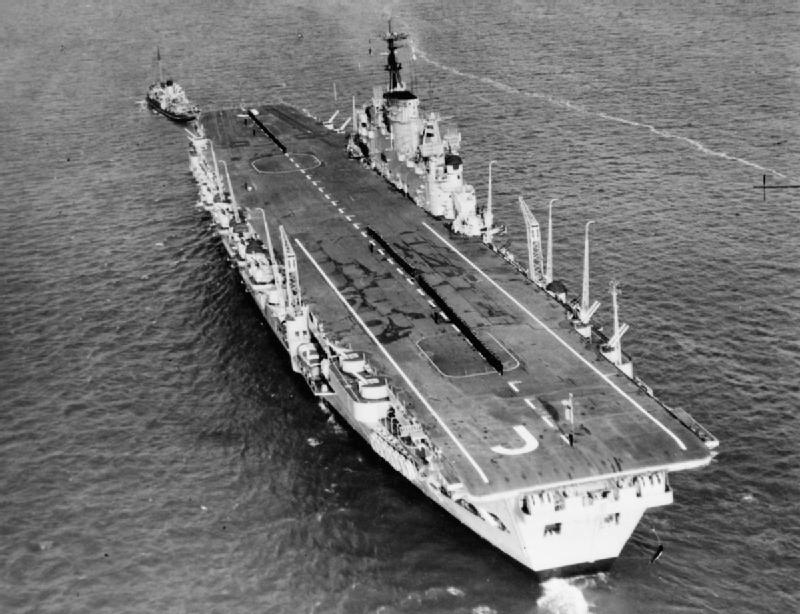
HMS Eagle

1950 - 1952

- Royal Naval Air Station Ford (HMS Peregrine), West Sussex, (13 December 1950 - 21 May 1951)
- transit (21 - 25 May 1951)
- Royal Naval Air Station Hal Far (HMS Falcon), Malta, (25 May - 12 October 1951)
- HMS Illustrious (12 - 24 October 1951)
- Royal Naval Air Station Ford (HMS Peregrine), West Sussex, (24 October 1951 - 4 March 1952)
- HMS Eagle (4 -24 March 1952)
- Royal Naval Air Station Ford (HMS Peregrine), West Sussex, (24 March -3 June 1952)
- HMS Eagle (3 June - 7 July 1952)
- Royal Naval Air Station Ford (HMS Peregrine), West Sussex, (7 July - 3 September 1952)
- HMS Eagle (3 September - 4 October 1952)
- Royal Naval Air Station Lossiemouth (HMS Fulmar), Moray, (4 - 20 October 1952)
- HMS Eagle (20 October 1952 - 3 December 1952)
- Royal Naval Air Station Ford (HMS Peregrine), West Sussex, disbanded - (3 December 1952)

1954 - 1955

- Royal Naval Air Station Ford (HMS Peregrine), West Sussex, (1 November 1954 - 10 May 1955)
  - Royal Naval Air Station Lossiemouth (HMS Fulmar), Moray, (Detachment February 1955)
  - Royal Air Force Coltishall, Norfolk, (Detachment March 1955)
- HMS Bulwark (Deck Landing Training (DLT) March 1955)
- HMS Eagle (10 - 27 May 1955)
- Royal Naval Air Station Ford (HMS Peregrine), West Sussex, (27 May - 4 June 1955)
- HMS Eagle (4 June - 19 November 1955)
  - Royal Naval Air Station Hal Far (HMS Falcon), Malta, (Detachment 24 June - 18 July 1955)
  - Royal Naval Air Station Hal Far (HMS Falcon), Malta, (Detachment three aircraft 2 - 3 August 1955)
  - RN Air Section Gibraltar, Gibraltar, (Detachment 23 August - 8 September 1955)
- Royal Naval Air Station Ford (HMS Peregrine), West Sussex, (19 - 22 November 1955)
- disbanded - (22 November 1955)

== Commanding officers ==
List of commanding officers of 827 Naval Air Squadron:

1941 - 1946

- Lieutenant Commander W.G.C. Stokes, RN, from 15 September 1940 (Commander 30 June 1941)
- Lieutenant Commander J.A. Stewart-Moore, RN, from 18 July 1941
- Lieutenant Commander P.G.O. Sydney-Turner, RN, from 21 August 1941
- Lieutenant Commander D.K. Buchanan-Dunlop, RN, from 23 April 1942
- Lieutenant R.W. Little, DSC, RN, from 2 September 1942
- Lieutenant Commander(A) J.S. Bailey, RN, 15 December 1942
- Lieutenant Commander(A) R.S. Baker-Falkner, DSC, RN, from 14 July 1943
- Lieutenant Commander(A) K.H. Gibney, DSC, RN, from 25 October 1943
- Lieutenant Commander(A) G.R. Woolston, RN, from 26 June 1944
- Lieutenant Commander(A) G.R. Clarke, RN, 6 July 1945
- Lieutenant Commander(A) L.R. Thy, RN, 16 December 1945
- disbanded - 24 July 1946

1946 - 1950

- Lieutenant Commander P.C. Heath, RN, from 15 August 1946
- Lieutenant Commander P.B. Jackson, RN, from 18 April 1949
- Lieutenant Commander N. Matthews, DSC, RN, 24 October 1949
- Lieutenant Commander B.C. Lyons, RN, from 11 December 1949
- disbanded - 22 November 1950

1950 - 1952

- Lieutenant Commander R.D. Henderson, RN, from 13 December 1950
- Lieutenant Commander L.G. Morris, RN, from 11 July 1952
- disbanded - 3 December 1952

1954 - 1955

- Lieutenant Commander S.J.A. Richardson, RN, from 1 November 1954
- disbanded - 22 November 1955

Note: Abbreviation (A) signifies Air Branch of the RN or RNVR.

== See also ==
- Allied order of battle for Operation Tungsten
