= 830 Naval Air Squadron =

Inactive flying squadron of the Royal Navy's Fleet Air Arm

- Squadron badge
- Active: 1940–1943; 1943–1944; 1955–1957
- Disbanded: 5 January 1957
- Country: United Kingdom
- Branch: Royal Navy
- Type: Torpedo Bomber Reconnaissance squadron
- Role: Carrier-based: anti-submarine warfare (ASW); anti-surface warfare (ASuW); Air interdiction (AI)
- Part of: Fleet Air Arm
- Home station: See Naval air stations section for full list.
- Mottos: In via gloriae (Latin for 'In the way of glory')
- Engagements: World War II; Suez Crisis
- Battle honours: Mediterranean 1940-1942; Norway 1944

Commanders
- Notable commanders: Lieutenant Commander C.V. Howard, RN

Insignia
- Squadron Badge Description: Per fess wavy blue and barry wavy of six white and blue, a winged sword erect pommel and hilt gold wings displayed also gold surmounted by a Cross paty white (1944)
- Identification Markings: single letters (Swordfish); 5A+ (Barracuda); 124-128 (Wyvern); 370-379 (Wyvern from February 1956)
- Fin Carrier Code: J (Wyvern)

Aircraft flown
- Attack: Westland Wyvern
- Bomber: Fairey Swordfish; Fairey Albacore; Fairey Barracuda

830 Naval Air Squadron (830 NAS), also referred to as 830 Squadron, is an inactive Fleet Air Arm (FAA) naval air squadron of the United Kingdom’s Royal Navy (RN). The squadron was last active in October 1955 with the Westland Wyvern turboprop strike fighter. Flying from HMS Eagle, 830's Wyverns took part in the Suez operation of November 1956, before again disbanding in January 1957.

It formed in Malta in July 1940 flying Fairey Swordfish torpedo bombers. During 1940–41 the squadron carried out attacks against the Axis supply effort in the Mediterranean. These included torpedo attacks against merchant ships and their Royal Italian Navy warship escorts, and also bomb attacks on port installations in Sicily and Libya. In July 1941 the squadron began operations with ASV RDF airborne radar to locate ships. Operations were mostly by night, with some dusk bombing sorties to Sicily. By March 1942 the squadron was so depleted that it merged with 828 Naval Air Squadron and continued operations. By March 1943, however, losses were such that the composite squadron ceased to exist.

In May 1943, 830 Squadron was reformed in its own right at Lee-on-Solent as a torpedo-bomber reconnaissance squadron operating Barracuda IIs. Most of the squadron's personnel at this time were New Zealanders. After completing training, in March 1944 the squadron embarked upon HMS Furious and subsequently participated in Operation Tungsten, a dive bombing attack on the German battleship Tirpitz. Throughout May to October the squadron alternated between the Furious and HMS Formidable and continued to carry out operations against the Tirpitz. In October 1944 the squadron was absorbed by 827 Naval Air Squadron and ceased to exist.

== History ==
=== Torpedo, bomber, reconnaissance squadron (1940-1943) ===
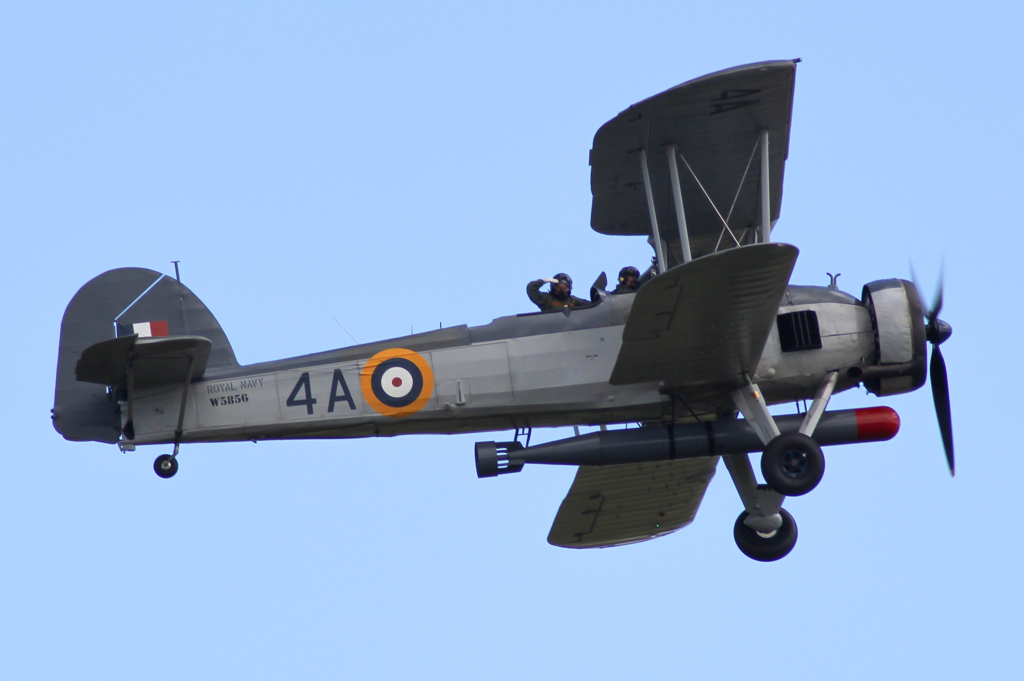
Fairey Swordfish; an example of the type used by 830 Squadron

830 Naval Air Squadron was established on 1 July 1940, at RAF Hal Far, Malta, evolving from 767 Squadron and initially equipped with twelve Fairey Swordfish torpedo bomber aircraft. The squadron conducted bombing missions targeting Sicily and Libya, which included a notable dive-bombing operation aimed at oil storage facilities in Sicily. On 19 July it also successfully attacked a U-boat.

Throughout the remainder of 1940, only a limited number of operations were conducted until the squadron was fully reinforced in January 1941. Most missions were executed at night due to the vulnerability of the Swordfish aircraft to Axis fighters based in Sicily. Operations persisted throughout 1941, encompassing mine laying, bombing, and torpedo strikes. By May, a few aircraft equipped with ASV radar arrived in Malta, serving as target locators for subsequent missions, and from October, 828 Squadron joined in these offensive efforts.

By March 1942, the squadron underwent a significant transformation as it merged with 828 Squadron, resulting in the formation of the Naval Air Squadron Malta. Following this merger, the aircraft previously assigned to the squadron were transferred to 828, thereby consolidating resources. 830 Squadron was officially disbanded on 31 March 1943.

Between August 1940 and August 1942, the squadron experienced the loss of twenty-eight aircrew members who became prisoners of war in Italy, with many subsequently transferred to Germany or interned by Vichy forces in North Africa. While stationed in Malta, the squadron, in conjunction with 828 Squadron, successfully sank thirty enemy ships and inflicted damage on an additional fifty vessels.

=== Barracuda (1943-1944) ===
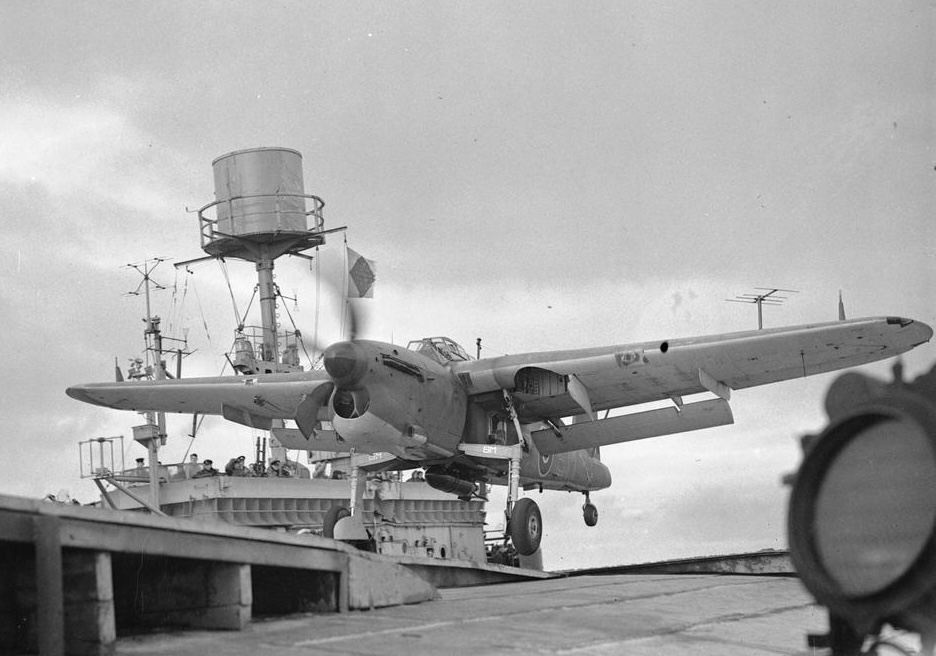
830 Squadron Barracuda taking off from HMS Furious at the start of Operation Mascot

It reformed on 15May 1943, at RNAS Lee-on-Solent (HMS Daedalus), Hampshire. The unit operated as a Torpedo Bomber Reconnaissance (TBR) squadron, equipped with twelve Fairey Barracuda, a torpedo and dive bomber aircraft, primarily piloted by members of the Royal New Zealand Naval Volunteer Reserve (RNZNVR). By October 1943, it became part of the 8th Naval TBR Wing and joined HMS Furious, albeit with a reduced complement of nine aircraft, utilising RNAS Hatston (HMS Sparrowhawk), Mainland, Orkney, as a base for operations for Norway. On 3 April 1944, during Operation Tungsten, the squadron, alongside 827 Squadron, successfully executed a dive bombing attack on the German battleship Tirpitz, achieving ten hits but losing one aircraft in the process. Subsequent missions were less fruitful; a planned attack in May 1944 was scrapped due to inclement weather, and Operation Goodwood on 17 July, embarked in HMS Formidable, was thwarted as the Germans managed to deploy a dense smokescreen. The squadron was ultimately disbanded at RNAS Hatston on 30 October, merging into 827 Squadron.

=== Wyvern (1955-1957) ===
On 21 November 1955, 830 Squadron was reformed at RNAS Ford (HMS Peregrine), West Sussex, as a torpedo strike squadron, equipped with nine Westland Wyvern S.4 aircraft. The squadron embarked on the Audacious-class aircraft carrier HMS Eagle in April 1956 for a Mediterranean exercise. In November of the same year, it played a significant role during the Suez operation, completing eighty-two sorties that targeted airfields, including the former Naval Air Station Dekheila (HMS Grebe), Alexandria and various sites in the Canal Zone. Following the withdrawal from Egypt in December, HMS Eagle returned to the United Kingdom, and 830 Squadron was disbanded in January 1957.

== Aircraft flown ==
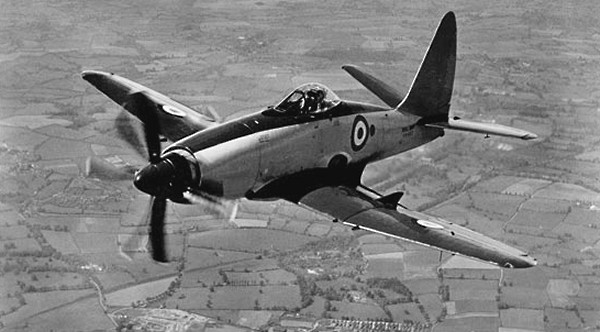
Westland Wyvern S.4

The squadron has operated a variety of different aircraft and versions:

- Fairey Swordfish I torpedo bomber (July1940 - March 1943)
- Fairey Albacore torpedo bomber (September 1940 - July 1942)
- Fairey Barracuda II torpedo and dive bomber (May 1943 - September 1944)
- Westland Wyvern S.4 strike aircraft (November 1955 - January 1957)

== Battle honours ==
The Battle Honours awarded to 830 Naval Air Squadron are:

- Mediterranean 1940-42
- Norway 1944

== Assignments ==
830 Naval Air Squadron was assigned as needed to form part of a number of larger units:

- 8th Naval TBR Wing (25 October 1943 - 3 October 1944)

== Naval air stations and aircraft carriers ==
830 Naval Air Squadron was active at various naval air stations of the Royal Navy and Royal Air Force stations, both within the United Kingdom and internationally. Additionally, it operated from several Royal Navy fleet carriers:

=== World War Two air stations and aircraft carriers ===
List of air stations and aircraft carriers used by 830 Naval Air Squadron during World War two including dates:

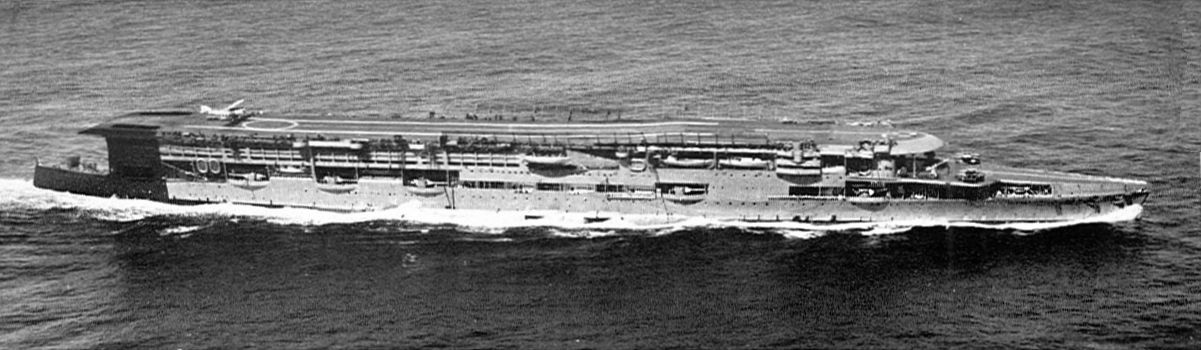
HMS Furious

1940 - 1943

- Royal Air Force Hal Far, Malta, (1 July 1940 - 31 March 1943)
- disbanded - (31 March 1943)

1943 -1944

- Royal Naval Air Station Lee-on-Solent (HMS Daedalus), Hampshire, (15 May - 18 June 1943)
- Royal Naval Air Station Hatston (HMS Sparrowhawk), Mainland, Orkney, (18 June - 16 August 1943)
- Royal Naval Air Station Machrihanish (HMS Landrail), Argyll and Bute, (16 August - 9 October 1943)
- HMS Furious (9 October - 6 December 1943)
- Royal Naval Air Station Hatston (HMS Sparrowhawk), Mainland, Orkney, (6 - 10 December 1943)
- HMS Furious (10 - 14 December 1943)
- Royal Naval Air Station Hatston (HMS Sparrowhawk), Mainland, Orkney, (14 - 26 December 1943)
- HMS Furious (26 December 1943 - 3 January 1944)
- Royal Naval Air Station Hatston (HMS Sparrowhawk), Mainland, Orkney, (3 January - 8 February 1944)
- HMS Furious (8 - 14 February 1944)
- Royal Naval Air Station Hatston (HMS Sparrowhawk), Mainland, Orkney, (14 - 24 February 1944)
- HMS Furious (24 - 29 February 1944)
- Royal Naval Air Station Hatston (HMS Sparrowhawk), Mainland, Orkney, (29 February - 17 March 1944)
- HMS Furious (17 - 22 March 1944)
- Royal Naval Air Station Hatston (HMS Sparrowhawk), Mainland, Orkney, (22 - 28 March 1944)
- HMS Furious (28 March - 7 April 1944)
- Royal Naval Air Station Donibristle (HMS Merlin), Fife, (7 - 20 April 1944)
- HMS Furious (20 - 28 April 1944)
- Royal Naval Air Station Hatston (HMS Sparrowhawk), Mainland, Orkney, (28 April - 3 May 1944)
- HMS Furious (3 -18 May 1944)
- Royal Naval Air Station Hatston (HMS Sparrowhawk), Mainland, Orkney, (18 - 28 May 1944)
- HMS Furious (28 May - 17 June 1944)
- Royal Naval Air Station Hatston (HMS Sparrowhawk), Mainland, Orkney, (17 June - 9 July 1944)
- HMS Formidable (9 - 19 July 1944)
- Royal Naval Air Station Hatston (HMS Sparrowhawk), Mainland, Orkney,(19 July - 9 August 1944)
- HMS Furious (9 - 21 August 1944)
- Royal Naval Air Station Hatston (HMS Sparrowhawk), Mainland, Orkney, (21 August - 21 September 1944)
- disbanded - (21 September 1944)

1955 - 1957

- Royal Naval Air Station Ford (HMS Peregrine), West Sussex, (21 November 1955 - 16 April 1956)
- HMS Eagle (16 April - 29 June 1956)
  - Royal Naval Air Station Hal Far (HMS Falcon), Malta, (Detachment six aircraft 7 - 22 May 1956)
- Royal Naval Air Station Hal Far (HMS Falcon), Malta, (29 June - 16 July 1956)
- HMS Eagle (16 July 1956 - 3 January 1957)
  - Royal Naval Air Station Hal Far (HMS Falcon), Malta, (Detachment four/six aircraft 3 - 14 August 1956, 23 August - 4 September 1956, 5 - 9 October 1956)
  - Royal Air Force North Front, Gibraltar, (Detachment three aircraft 13 - 20 October 1956)
  - Royal Naval Air Station Hal Far (HMS Falcon), Malta, Detachment 30 November - 11 December 1956)
- Royal Naval Air Station Lee-on-Solent (HMS Daedalus), Hampshire/Royal Naval Air Station Stretton (HMS Blackcap), Cheshire, (aircraft) (3 January 1957)
- disbanded UK - (5 January 1957)

== Commanding officers ==
List of commanding officers of 830 Naval Air Squadron:

1940 - 1943

- Captain K.L. Ford, RM, from 1 July 1940
- Lieutenant Commander F.D. Howie, RN, from 1 August 1940
- Lieutenant Commander J.G. Hunt, RN, from 1 September 1941 ( (POW) 13 December 1941)
- Lieutenant Commander F.H.E. Hopkins, RN, from 14 December 1941
- Lieutenant Commander A.J.T. Roe, DSO, RN, from 7 June 1942
- none, from 23 February 1943
- disbanded - 31 March 1943

1943 - 1944

- Lieutenant Commander(A) F.H. Fox, RN, from 24 May 1943
- Lieutenant Commander(A) R.D. Kingdon, DSC, RNVR, from 21 January 1944
- disbanded - 21 September 1944

1955 - 1957

- Lieutenant Commander C.V. Howard, RN, from 21 November 1955
- disbanded - 5 January 1957

Note: Abbreviation (A) signifies Air Branch of the RN or RNVR.

== See also ==
- Siege of Malta (World War II)
- Ian Fraser (Royal Navy pilot) - recipient of the Distinguished Service Cross and former-830 Squadron pilot
- Gartrell Parker - flying ace and former-830 Squadron pilot
