= Roy Sydney Baker-Falkner =

British World War II naval aviator

Lieutenant-Commander Roy Sydney Baker-Falkner DSO DSC
- Born: 3 June 1916; Nottingham, England
- Died: 18 July 1944 (aged 28); Norway, Scandinavia
- Military career
- Allegiance: Canada, United Kingdom
- Branch: Royal Navy
- Service years: 1929–1944; 1939–1944
- Rank: Lieutenant-Commander
- Commands: 8th Naval TBR Wing; 827 Naval Air Squadron; 812 Naval Air Squadron
- Conflicts: Second World War: Battle of France; Battle of Britain; The Blitz; Channel Front; Arctic Convoys; Tirpitz
- Awards: Distinguished Service Order; Distinguished Service Cross & Bar; Mentioned in Despatches

Roy Sydney Baker-Falkner DSO DSC (3 June 1916 – 18 July 1944) was a Canadian Royal Navy Fleet Air Arm naval aviator and wing leader during the Second World War, who attained the rank of Lieutenant commander. He was a veteran of the evacuation of Dunkirk, one of the few naval Battle of Britain pilots, was test pilot for the Admiralty, starred in a Ealing Studio Royal Navy film, and credited with crippling the German battleship Tirpitz as strike leader of over 100 aircraft.

== Early life ==
He was born in Nottingham to pioneer farmer Reginald Sydney Falkner of the Canadian Expeditionary Force who was serving in the Canadian Army Medical Corps in England before he was invalided back to Canada in 1917 with his wife and newborn son.

Falkner grew up on a farm in Brandon, Manitoba and later in Broadview, Saskatchewan where his father was secretary to the Canadian Great War Veterans Association. In the 1920s, with his father's new posting to Victoria in British Columbia, Roy attended Mackenzie Elementary School in Victoria, initially training in music, awarded his Certificate of Music in November 1929.

== Early career ==
Falkner subsequently joined the Royal Canadian Navy at the nearby Esquimalt naval base as a cadet in fall 1929, He was awarded a Commonwealth military scholarship as Dominion of Canada overseas cadet at the Royal Naval College, Dartmouth in 1930, changing his surname to Baker-Falkner.

Baker-Falkner subsequently served as midshipman aboard the flagship, the cruiser HMS Kent, on the China Station at Hong Kong, between 1934 and 1936. During the late of that period he was a witness of aerial torpedoing exercises among a context of international situation worsening and effective sabotages perpetrated against the Fleet. In 1937 on return to the UK, he specialised as a TSR/TBR (Note: "torpedo/spotter/reconnaissance" and "torpedo/bomber/reconnaissance") torpedo and dive bomber pilot and was commissioned with joint Royal Navy and Royal Air Force ranks of Sub lieutenant RN/Flight Lieutenant RAF with seniority from 4 January 1937. (Note: The FLeet Air Arm was part of the RAF until 24 May 1939 when it was transferred to the RN) He subsequently served with 812 Naval Air Squadron at RAF Hal Far in Malta in 1938. At that time Hal Far was a naval air station under the control of the RAF. He reached seniority of lieutenant on 6 January 1939.

== Second World War ==
After the outbreak of the Second World War in 1939, Baker-Falkner remained in Malta with his squadron, serving onboard the fleet aircraft carrier HMS Glorious. With the threat of invasion of Malta by Italy his ship was subsequently stationed at RNAS Dekheila in Alexandria, Egypt. When Glorious was called back to the Home Fleet in 1940, Baker-Falkner was posted to 819 Naval Air Squadron preparing for the attack on the Italian fleet at Taranto, however with the fall of Norway and the sinking of his ship HMS Glorious, Baker-Falkner returned to 812 Squadron which was attached to RAF Coastal Command at RAF North Coates, Lincolnshire. He carried out his first air operations over occupied Europe aerial mining coastal waters and harbours of France, Belgium, Netherlands and Germany. He saw action over Rotterdam airport and the invading German army, and attacked German panzer tanks at Gravelines during the defence of Dunkirk. He saw further operations over France attacking German convoys during the Battle of France in 1940.

During the confusion of summer 1940 he and other Fleet Air Arm pilots were seconded and rushed to reinforce RAF Fighter Command and Baker-Falkner took part in the Battle of Britain.

Baker-Falkner took part in Operation Dunlop in April 1941 as part of the Malta Convoys to deliver urgently needed fighter planes to Malta, at the height of the siege of Malta. He provided aerial cover to HMS Argus and HMS Ark Royal.

== Attacks on Tirpitz and missing (believed killed) in action ==
Baker-Falkner led the subsequent Fleet Air Arm attack on the largely repaired Tirpitz on 17 July 1944 in Operation Mascot.

== Commemoration ==
... the Canadian Book of Remembrance and the Canadian Virtual War Memorial, as well as in his home towns on British Columbia and in Teignmouth, Devon, as well as the London Embankment Battle of Britain War Memorial, the Canadian Roll of Honour in the Fleet Air Arm Archive 1939-1945, and the Fleet Air Arm Museum Roll of Honour
