= Operation Tungsten =

Second World War Royal Navy air raid

Coordinates: 69.9353°N 23.0454°E

- Part of the Second World War
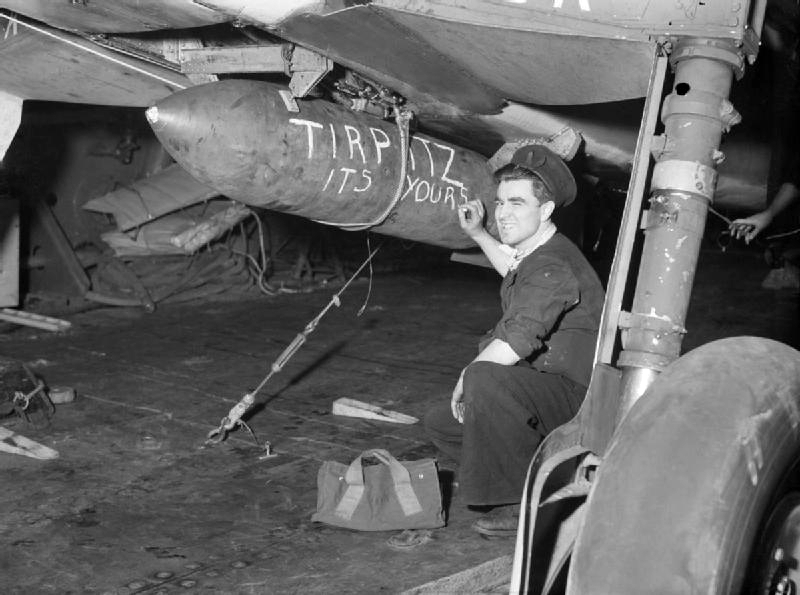
- A Fleet Air Arm crewman chalks a message on the 1,600-pound bomb carried by a Fairey Barracuda of HMS Furious
| Date | 3 April 1944 |
| Location | Kaafjord, Norway |
| Result | British victory |

Belligerents
| United Kingdom; Canada | Germany |

Commanders and leaders
| (United Kingdom) Henry Moore | (Nazi Germany) Hans Meyer |

Strength
| 40 dive bombers; 80 fighters | Battleship Tirpitz; Anti-aircraft batteries; Ships |

Casualties and losses
| 9 killed; 4 aircraft lost | 123 killed; 329 wounded; Tirpitz and 5 other vessels damaged |

Operation Tungsten was a Second World War air raid by the Fleet Air Arm of the Royal Navy against the German battleship Tirpitz. The operation sought to damage or destroy Tirpitz at her base in Kaafjord in the far north of Norway before she could become fully operational again following a period of repairs.

The British decision to strike Kaafjord was motivated by fears that the battleship, upon re-entering service, would attack strategically important convoys carrying supplies to the Soviet Union. Removing the threat posed by Tirpitz would also allow the Allies to redeploy the capital ships which had to be held in the North Sea to counter her. After four months of training and preparations, the British Home Fleet sailed on 30 March 1944 and aircraft launched from five aircraft carriers struck Kaafjord on 3 April. The raid achieved surprise, and the British aircraft met little opposition. Fifteen bombs hit the battleship, and strafing by fighter aircraft inflicted heavy casualties on her gun crews. Four British aircraft and nine airmen were lost during the operation.

The damage inflicted during the attack was not sufficient to sink or disable Tirpitz but she suffered considerable damage to her superstructure and unarmored areas, with 122 members of her crew killed and 316 wounded. The German Kriegsmarine decided to repair the battleship, and works were completed by mid-July. The British conducted further carrier raids against Tirpitz between April and August 1944 to prolong the period she was out of service but all failed. Tirpitz was eventually disabled and then sunk by Royal Air Force heavy bombers in late 1944.

== Background ==
The threat posed by Tirpitz had an important influence on British naval strategy. She was commissioned in February 1941 and completed her crew training late that year. At about the same time the German high command decided to station the battleship in Norway; this deployment was intended to deter a feared Allied invasion of Norway and threaten the Arctic convoys which regularly sailed through the Arctic Sea to the Soviet Union. The convoys carried large quantities of war material from ports in Britain and Iceland, and were frequently attacked by the German air and naval units stationed in Norway. Tirpitz arrived in Norway in January 1942 and operated from anchorages in fjords. While she was operational the Allies had to keep a powerful force of warships with the British Home Fleet to guard against the possibility of a sortie against the Arctic convoys and capital ships accompanied most convoys part of the way to the Soviet Union.

The location of Kaafjord in northern Norway

The British attacked Tirpitz several times during 1942 and 1943. When the battleship sortied to intercept Convoy PQ 12 on 6 March 1942 HMS Victorious, that formed part of the convoy's escort, attempted to attack her using torpedo bombers. These aircraft launched twenty torpedoes at the battleship but all missed. On several occasions during 1942 and 1943 bombers from the Royal Air Force and Soviet Air Forces attempted to strike Tirpitz in her anchorages but without success. On 23 September 1943 two British X-class midget submarines penetrated the defences around the battleship at her main anchorage at Kaafjord in northern Norway during Operation Source and placed explosive charges in the water beneath her. This attack caused extensive damage to Tirpitz, putting her out of service for six months.

Repairs to Tirpitz were carried out using improvised facilities at Kaafjord as it was considered too risky to attempt to move the warship to Germany, equipment and work crews were shipped to the fjord from German ports. On the night of 10/11 February 1944, 15 Soviet aircraft attacked the battleship but did not cause any damage. By 17 March, the repairs to Tirpitz's armament, machinery and hull were complete, but several minor repair tasks were outstanding. During the period the ship was under repair, Scharnhorst, the only remaining operational German battleship, was sunk on 26 December during the Battle of the North Cape. Following this engagement the Royal Navy stopped deploying battleships to cover convoys travelling to and from the Soviet Union. By this stage of the war the Allies also had large numbers of anti-submarine and anti-aircraft escort ships available, and were able to assign strong forces to protect the Arctic convoys. German submarines operating in the Norwegian Sea were rarely able to evade the convoy escorts, and few merchant vessels suffered damage from German attack.

The British Government and Royal Navy were concerned about the threat Tirpitz posed once she re-entered service. Allied intelligence tracked the progress of work on the battleship using decrypted German radio signals, photo reconnaissance flights and witness reports from agents in Norway. It was feared the battleship could sortie and attack convoys in the Norwegian Sea or Atlantic Ocean after the repairs were completed. The need to guard against this possibility would also occupy warships needed to support the planned Operation Overlord the invasion of France. It was decided in late 1943 to make further attempts to sink the battleship. Despite Allied concerns, Tirpitz posed only a limited danger to Allied shipping. From late 1943 the battleship was unable to put to sea for crew training due to the threat of Allied attack and fuel shortages. These shortages also meant the Germans were unable to move the battleship between anchorages to make her more difficult to locate and attack.

== Preparations ==
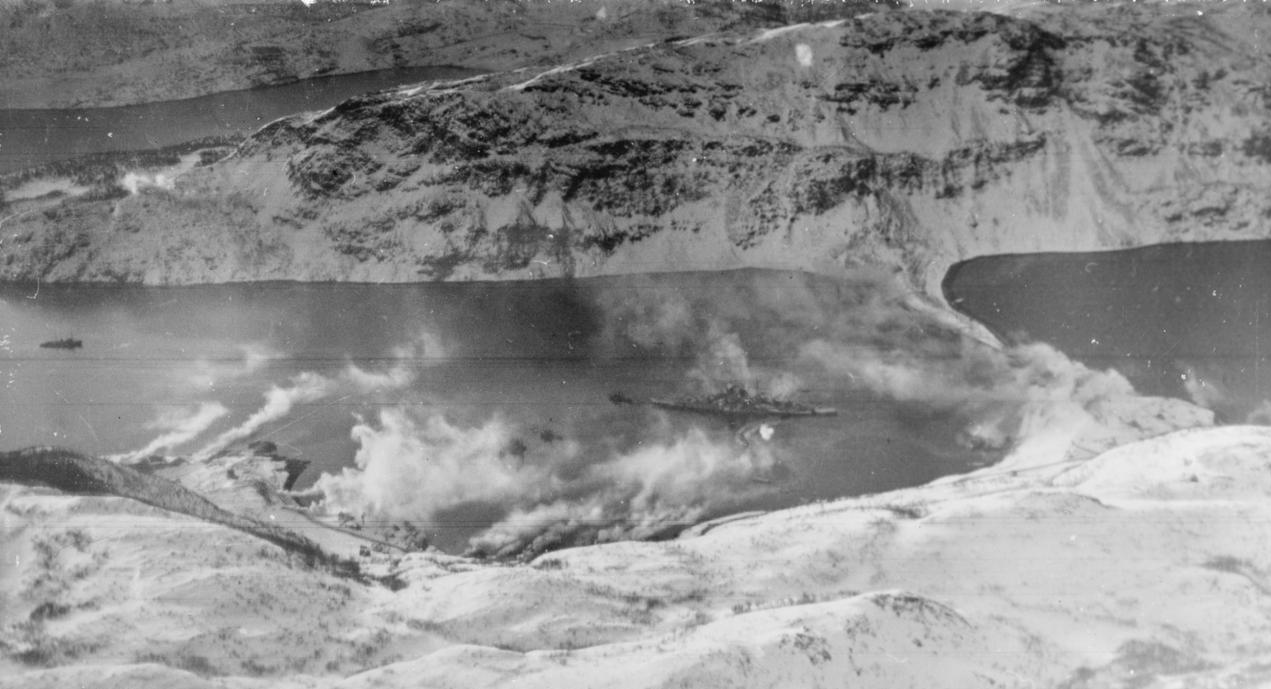
A British aerial reconnaissance photograph of Tirpitz moored at Kaafjord. The artificial smoke generators on the shores of the fjord have not yet obscured her.

The options for attacking Tirpitz at Kaafjord were limited. Another submarine-borne raid was considered impractical as intelligence gathered from intercepted radio transmissions and field agents indicated that the battleship's underwater defences had been improved and more aerial reconnaissance patrols of the region were being flown. The commander of the Royal Air Force's Bomber Command, Air Chief Marshal Sir Arthur Harris, also refused to attempt a heavy bomber raid on Tirpitz on the grounds that the Kaafjord area was beyond the effective range of these aircraft and the battleship's guns would cause heavy casualties. After these two options were ruled out, the task was assigned to the Home Fleet's aircraft carriers. At this time the large fleet carriers HMS Furious and Victorious and four smaller escort carriers were ready.

Planning for the raid on Kaafjord began in December 1943. Vice Admiral Bruce Fraser, the commander of the Home Fleet, was not optimistic about the prospects for success, and had to be persuaded to undertake the operation by First Sea Lord Sir Andrew Cunningham. Fraser gave his second in command, Vice Admiral Sir Henry Moore, responsibility for planning and leading the raid. The operation was initially designated "Operational Thrustful", but was later renamed "Operation Tungsten". The attack was originally scheduled for mid-March 1944, shortly before the time Allied intelligence believed Tirpitz would become operational. However, it was delayed by two weeks while Victorious was fitted with new radars. The British considered cancelling Operation Tungsten in February as Victorious was also needed in the Indian Ocean to counter a build-up of Japanese warships at Singapore. To enable the attack to proceed, the United States Navy agreed to temporarily transfer USS Saratoga to the Eastern Fleet so that Victorious could be retained in the North Sea.

The plans for the raid were centred on two dive-bombing attacks by Fleet Air Arm Fairey Barracuda aircraft. Led by Strike Leader Roy Sydney Baker-Falkner, each of the attacks was to involve 21 Barracudas escorted by 40 fighters; Vought F4U Corsairs flying from Victorious would provide protection against German aircraft while Wildcats and Hellcats operating from Furious and the escort carriers HMS Emperor, Pursuer and Searcher were to strafe anti-aircraft guns near Tirpitz and on the battleship. Aircraft flying from Furious and the escort carrier HMS Fencer would protect the fleet against attack by German aircraft or submarines. Carrier aircraft had lacked a bomb capable of penetrating a battleship's thick deck armour, it was hoped that the new 1,600-pound (730 kg) armour-piercing bomb would be able to pierce at least the first layer of Tirpitz's armour if they were dropped from an altitude of 3,500 feet (1,100 m) or higher. The damage caused by such hits was expected to put the battleship out of service. Nine of the Barracudas were to be armed with 1,600-pounders and a further 22 would each carry three 500 lb (230 kg) semi-armour-piercing bombs that were capable of penetrating the lightly protected upper decks of the ship if dropped from above 2,000 feet (610 m). The remaining ten aircraft would be armed with 500 lb (230 kg) and 600 lb (270 kg) general-purpose bombs and with anti-submarine bombs intended to inflict casualties among the battleship's crew and cause underwater damage if they exploded in the water near her hull. The aircraft carrying high-explosive bombs were to attack first as it was hoped that these weapons would knock out at least some of the battleship's anti-aircraft guns.

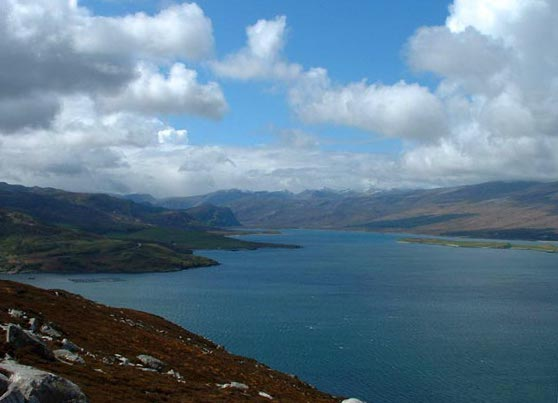
Loch Eriboll in Scotland was used to simulate Kaafjord during training exercises

The Fleet Air Arm units selected for Operation Tungsten conducted intensive training from February 1944 under Roy Sydney Baker-Falkner with his very experienced 827 Naval Air Squadron and 830 Naval Air Squadron. A high proportion of the airmen of the 2nd Wing 829 NAS and 831 NAS were inexperienced and the captain of Victorious estimated that 85 per cent of the aircrew embarked on his ship had not operated at sea. The training programme was centred on Loch Eriboll in northern Scotland which, like Kaafjord, was surrounded by steep hills. Flying from RNAS Hatston in the Orkney Islands, aircrew practiced manoeuvring around this terrain to familiarise themselves with the tactics needed to avoid German anti-aircraft guns and attack Tirpitz. The Royal Navy drew on intelligence on the defences of Kaafjord to make the exercise range as similar to the conditions around Tirpitz as was possible, and the aircrew were extensively briefed on the locations of German positions. An area the size of the battleship was also marked out on an island in the centre of the loch and repeatedly bombed.

While these preparations were under way, the Allies continued to monitor Tirpitz. In late February the escort carrier HMS Chaser transported photo analysts and the ground crews for a Royal Air Force photo reconnaissance detachment to Vaenga airfield in northern Russia. These personnel were joined by three Supermarine Spitfires fitted for photo reconnaissance work and a Consolidated PBY Catalina in March. The Spitfires flew regular sorties over Kaafjord and took detailed photographs of Tirpitz and the nearby anti-aircraft batteries on 12 and 13 March; after being developed the Catalina flew these images to Britain. Although the German forces in northern Norway detected the Spitfire flights, the Kaafjord area's defences were not increased or placed on alert. On 16 March eight British, Dutch and Norwegian submarines were directed to take up positions off the Norwegian coast after decrypted German radio messages indicated that Tirpitz may have been preparing to depart Kaafjord for Germany to complete her repairs. A further eight British and Dutch submarines were dispatched on 18 March, but two days later it was concluded that Tirpitz was not about to put to sea and the submarines were diverted to other tasks or ordered back to port. On 21 March, British intelligence warned the Admiralty that due to recent Soviet advances on the Eastern Front, the Germans were placing a strong emphasis on disrupting the flow of supplies to the Soviet Union and could dispatch Tirpitz to attack any convoys not escorted by capital ships. Fraser was directed to provide battleship protection for the next Arctic convoy.

The final decision to undertake Operation Tungsten was made in mid-March on the basis of a decrypted radio message that indicated that Tirpitz was almost ready for combat and would conduct high-speed trials on 1 April. As a result of the delays to the operation, the sailing of the attack force coincided with the departure of Convoy JW 58 for the Soviet Union. It was hoped that if German forces spotted the British fleet it would be assumed that the warships were supporting the convoy. As part of the final preparations for the attack, a full-scale rehearsal was conducted using the training range at Loch Eriboll on 28 March. From 1 April, the Admiralty received hourly weather reports from a group of Norwegian Secret Intelligence Service agents in Alta, near Kåfjord.

== Opposing forces ==
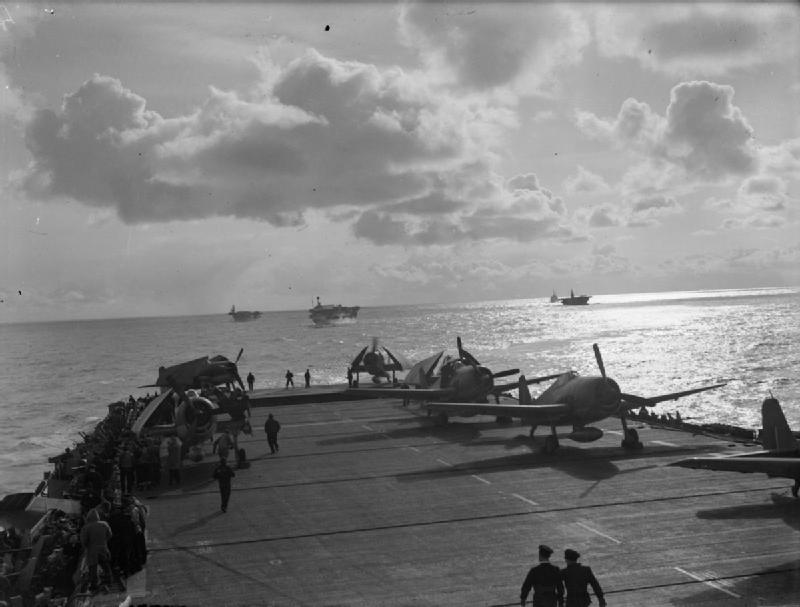
Hellcats on the escort carrier HMS Emperor, with other ships of the British force in the background

The Royal Navy assembled a powerful force for Operation Tungsten. The main striking force was made up of two wings of Barracudas. 8 Wing comprising 827 Naval Air Squadron and 830 Naval Air Squadron and 52 Wing with 829 and 831 Naval Air Squadrons. While 8 Wing was normally based on board Furious and 52 Wing on Victorious, Moore chose to station a squadron from each of the wings on each carrier so they could launch simultaneously and go into battle as formed units. The 163 Fleet Air Arm airmen in the attacking units included 28 New Zealanders, three Canadians, two Australians, and one South African; the remainder were British.

The large number of warships assigned to the operation were initially split into two groups. Force One was commanded by Fraser on board the battleship HMS Duke of York, and also included Victorious, the battleship HMS Anson (with Moore and his staff embarked), a light cruiser and five destroyers. Force Two was commanded by Rear Admiral Arthur La Touche Bisset and comprised Furious, the four escort carriers, five destroyers and two tankers. It was planned that Force One would initially provide support for Convoy JW 58 and Force Two would sail separately and proceed directly to a point off Norway where it would be joined by Anson and Victorious on 3 April and conduct the raid the next day.

Tirpitz's anchorage at Kaafjord was protected by anti-aircraft batteries and fighter aircraft. At the time of Operation Tungsten, four batteries of heavy anti-aircraft guns and seven batteries of light guns were located on the shore near the battleship. Several anti-aircraft vessels and destroyers were also usually moored near Tirpitz. The battleship herself was fitted with 68 anti-aircraft guns. Equipment capable of generating an artificial smokescreen to hide Tirpitz from aircraft had also been installed around Kaafjord. The German Air Force (Luftwaffe) had only a small number of fighters stationed at bases near Kaafjord, and their operations were constrained by a lack of fuel. British intelligence believed that the German fighter force in the area could be rapidly expanded in the event of an emergency. The Luftwaffe typically conducted three reconnaissance flights into the Arctic Sea each day.

== Attack ==
Force One departed the Home Fleet's base at Scapa Flow in the Orkney Islands on 30 March, three days after Convoy JW 58 had sailed from Loch Ewe in Scotland. Force Two departed separately later that day. The convoy comprised 49 merchant ships escorted by a powerful force of 33 warships, including two escort carriers. German reconnaissance aircraft located JW 58 on 30 March, and all of the U-boats in the Norwegian Sea were directed to intercept it. The German aircraft did not conduct wider-ranging sorties in search of the convoy's battleship covering force or other Allied ships. A total of 17 U-boats attacked JW 58 between 1 and 3 April without success; none of the Allied ships suffered any damage, and the escorts sank four U-boats and shot down six German aircraft during the convoy's voyage from Scotland to the Soviet Union. JW 58 reached its destination at Kola Bay on 6 April. While several Allied aircraft were lost during the voyage, mostly to flying accidents, all of the ships arrived unscathed.

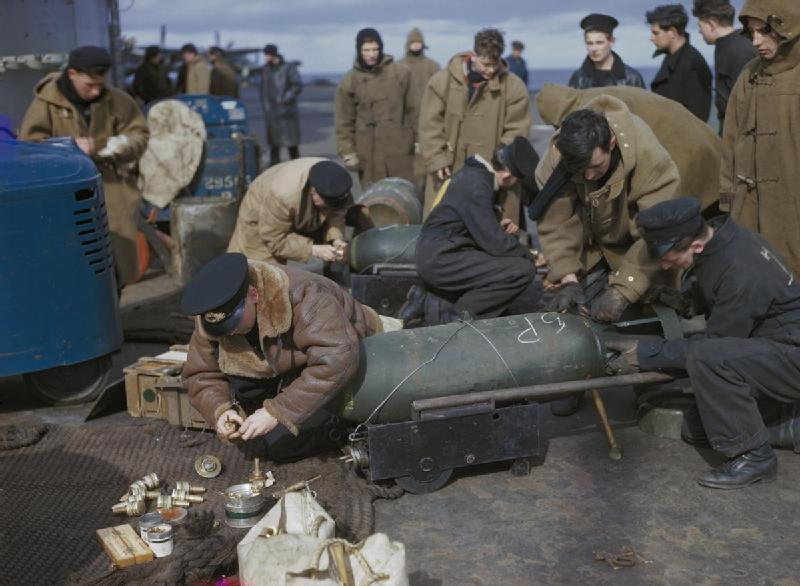
Fleet Air Arm personnel arming bombs on HMS Victorious' flight deck prior to the attack

Owing to a combination of favourable factors, Fraser decided on 1 April to bring the raid on Kaafjord forward by 24 hours. Decrypted German signals indicated that Tirpitz's trials had been delayed until 3 April, and Fraser hoped that an attack on this date would catch the battleship away from her usual well-protected mooring. Moreover, as JW 58's escorts were performing well and there was no indication that Tirpitz would sortie into the open sea, Fraser judged that Force One no longer needed to provide support for the transports. Weather conditions were also unusually good for the Norwegian Sea in early Spring and were well suited to flying operations. After the decision to attack was made both tankers and two escorting destroyers detached from Force Two and proceeded to a point 300 miles (480 km) north-west of Kaafjord where they remained to supply any destroyers that ran low on fuel. The rest of Force Two altered course to rendezvous with Force One, and this was achieved at 4:20 pm on 2 April. After the two forces met, Duke of York with Fraser on board, and two destroyers sailed to the north-west and took up a position where they would be able to intercept Tirpitz in the event that she had sailed from Kaafjord without being detected. The remainder of the Home Fleet proceeded to the strike's launching point.

The attack was launched during the early hours of 3 April. All the airmen were woken shortly after midnight, and attended a final briefing by Strike Leader Baker-Falkner from 1:15 am. The aircraft to be used in the strike were armed at this time, with all of the bombs being marked with messages for Tirpitz in chalk. The aircrew began boarding their aircraft at 4:00 am and flying-off operations started 15 minutes later; at this time the warships were 120 miles (190 km) from Kaafjord. Ten Corsairs drawn from 1834 and 1836 Naval Air Squadrons were the first aircraft to be launched and were followed by the 21 Barracudas of 8 Wing; 827 Squadron was launched from Victorious and 830 Squadron departed from Furious. Seven of the Barracudas were armed with a 1,600-pound bomb, and the remainder carried multiple 500 or 600-pound weapons. Once the Barracudas were airborne the remaining escort fighters – 30 Wildcats and Hellcats from 800, 881 and 882 Naval Air Squadrons – were launched. All the aircraft of the first wave were dispatched successfully, and the force completed forming up at 4:37 am. Flying conditions remained perfect, and German forces had not detected the British fleet during its approach.

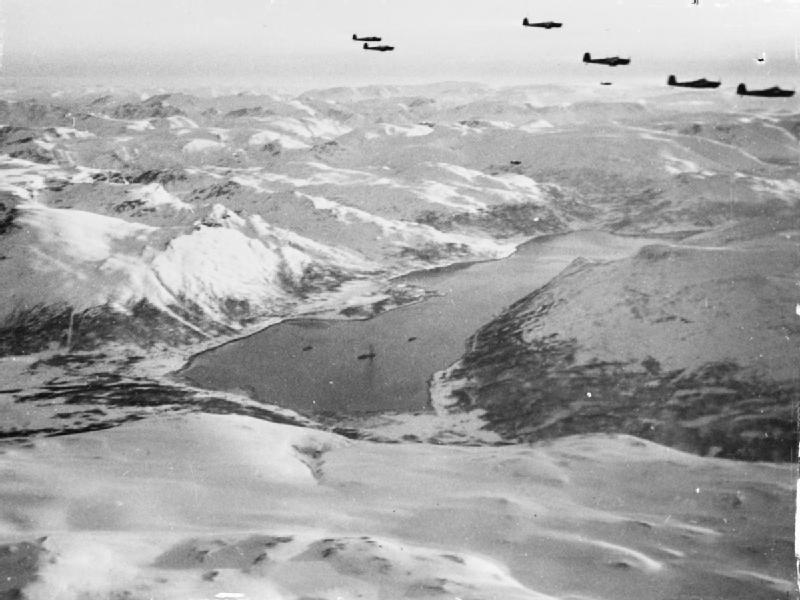
Barracudas flying over a fjord shortly before attacking Tirpitz

The first wave headed for Norway at low altitude, flying just 50 feet (15 m) above the sea to avoid detection by German radar. The aircraft began to climb to a higher altitude when they reached a point 20 miles (32 km) from the coast, and had reached 7,000 feet (2,100 m) by the time they made landfall at 5:08 am. The force approached the Altenfjord from the west, passing over the western end of the Langfjord before turning south, then looping to the north and attacking the battleship over the hills on the southern shore of Kaafjord shortly before 5:30 am.

The arrival of the British force caught Tirpitz by surprise. While the aircraft had first been picked up by a German radar station shortly after they crossed the Norwegian coastline, the battleship was not immediately warned. At the time of the attack Tirpitz was preparing to sail for her high-speed trials, and her crew were busy unmooring the vessel. Her five protective destroyers had already departed for the trials area in Stjern Sound. The warning from the radar station arrived shortly before the British aircraft appeared over Kaafjord, and the battleship's crew were still in the process of moving to their battle stations when the attack commenced; at this time not all of the watertight doors were closed and some damage-control stations were not fully manned.

As planned, the British raid began with Hellcat and Wildcat fighters strafing Tirpitz's anti-aircraft guns and batteries located on the shore; this attack inflicted heavy casualties on the battleship's gunners, disabled her main anti-aircraft control centre and damaged several guns. The fighters also strafed several anti-aircraft ships in Kaafjord. The 21 Barracudas began their attack shortly afterwards, and hit Tirpitz with a general-purpose bomb, three 500-pound semi-armour-piercing bombs and three 1,600-pound bombs within 60 seconds. Overall, ten bombs struck the battleship during the first attack. Most of these bombs did not penetrate the ship's armoured deck as they had been dropped from too low an altitude. Hundreds of members of the ship's crew died or were wounded; her commanding officer, Captain Hans Meyer, was among the wounded and intelligence officer Hugo Heydal assumed command. The battleship also drifted into the western shore of Kaafjord and ran aground, but was quickly refloated. One of 830 Squadron's Barracudas crashed following the attack with the loss of all three members of its crew. The surviving aircraft of the first wave began landing on the carriers at 6:19 am, and all were recovered by 6:42.

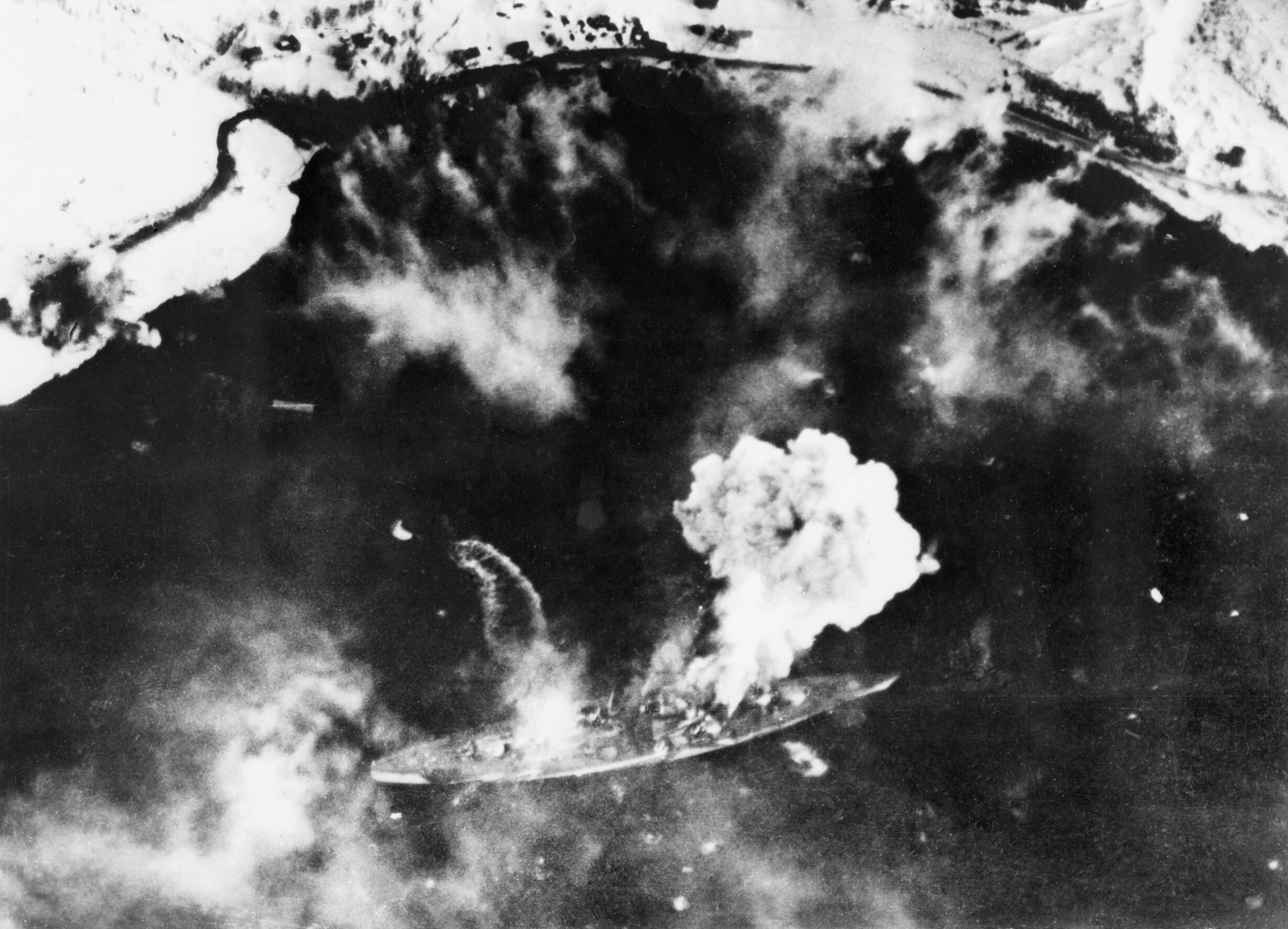
Bombs exploding around Tirpitz during the first attack on the battleship

The first aircraft of the second wave took to the air at 5:25 am. One of 829 Squadron's Barracudas crashed shortly after take-off, resulting in the deaths of its crew of three, and another aircraft from this squadron was not launched due to engine problems. Only two of the Barracudas in this wave were armed with 1,600-pound bombs. As with the first strike, 40 fighters accompanied the torpedo bombers; these comprised 10 Corsairs from 1834 and 1836 Naval Air Squadrons, all of the 20 Wildcats assigned to 896 and 898 Naval Air Squadrons and 10 Hellcats from 804 Naval Air Squadron. All aircraft were launched by 5:37 am, and the force had an uneventful flight to the Kaafjord area. While the German defences were now alert, the artificial smoke screen being generated around Kaafjord was not yet sufficient to hide Tirpitz from view.

The second attack on Tirpitz was similar to the first. It began with Hellcat fighters strafing the anti-aircraft batteries while Wildcats attacked the battleship. The fighters also attacked German ships in Kaafjord and a radio or radio direction finding station. The Barracudas executed their dive bombing attack at 6:36 am and struck Tirpitz with a 1,600-pound bomb and four 500-pound bombs within a minute. The German defences at Kaafjord received little warning of the incoming raid, and the smokescreen hid the British aircraft from sight. As a result, the gunners had to fire blindly and only shot down one of the Barracudas; all three airmen died. The second wave landed on the carriers between 7:20 and 7:58 am. A damaged Hellcat had to ditch near the Canadian destroyer HMCS Algonquin and one of the Corsairs suffered heavy damage as a result of a landing accident; both pilots survived.

During the period in which the air strikes were conducted, a force of 25 Wildcat and Supermarine Seafire fighters from 801, 842 and 880 Naval Air Squadrons provided air defence for the Home Fleet. Nine Fairey Swordfish torpedo bombers, which were also operated by 842 Naval Air Squadron, conducted anti-submarine patrols. No threat to the fleet developed, and Corsairs took over air defence duties at the conclusion of the two attacks.

During the early afternoon of 3 April, Moore considered conducting a further raid on Kaafjord the next day. He decided against doing so as the preliminary assessment of photos taken during the attack had concluded that Tirpitz was badly damaged. Moore was also aware that his aircrew were fatigued, and was reluctant to expose them to what would now be alert defences. Accordingly, he ordered that the fleet return to base, and it arrived at Scapa Flow in the afternoon of 6 April. King George VI and Prime Minister Winston Churchill sent congratulatory messages to the fleet, but both Churchill and Cunningham were concerned that Tirpitz could be returned to service. Cunningham also regretted Moore's decision not to launch a further strike on 4 April.

== Aftermath ==
=== Analysis ===
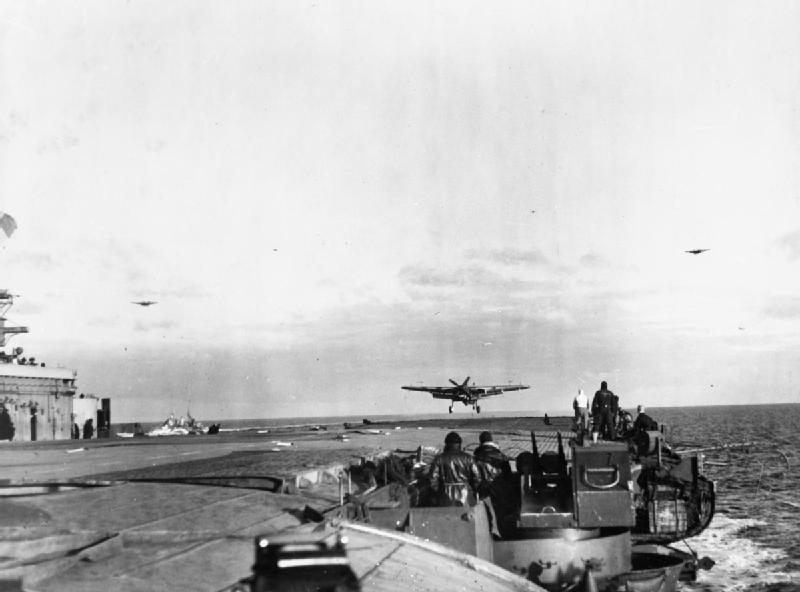
A Barracuda landing on HMS Victorious during Operation Tungsten

The two attacks on Tirpitz largely went to plan. The airmen found the defences and geography at Kaafjord to be very similar to the Loch Eriboll training range, and one of the post-attack reports stated that the operation had been "almost an exercise which they [the aircrew] had frequently carried out before". The official historian of the Royal Navy's role in the Second World War, Stephen Roskill, also judged that the strikes were "beautifully co-ordinated and fearlessly executed". The most important discrepancy between the plans for the operation and its execution was that many pilots dropped their bombs below the specified minimum altitude of 3,000 feet (910 m) in an attempt to improve their chances of hitting Tirpitz. The shorter than optimum flight times may have meant that some of the bombs which struck the battleship lacked the necessary velocity to penetrate her deck armour. Nine Royal Navy airmen died during the raid.

While two bombs that exploded in the water near Tirpitz opened holes in her hull and caused flooding, none of the 15 bombs that struck the battleship penetrated her main deck armour belt. As a result, her guns, magazines, and machinery did not suffer serious damage. Most of the damage to the battleship was inflicted on her superstructure and between her armoured decks. The starboard aircraft catapult and crane were destroyed, as were both Tirpitz's Arado floatplanes. The number two starboard 150-millimetre (5.9 in) gun turret was knocked out, and the number three port 150 mm turret incurred significant damage. The officers' mess and several galleys were wrecked, and the ship was filled with smoke. Tirpitz's funnel was also struck by bomb fragments that badly damaged all of the boiler intakes. While the starboard turbine was knocked out by shock damage and two of the boilers were disabled after being contaminated by salt water used for firefighting, the battleship was still capable of steaming within Kaafjord.

=== Casualties ===
Tirpitz's crew suffered severe casualties in the attack, 122 sailors died and 316 were wounded; these casualties represented 15 per cent of the crew. Many of the casualties were anti-aircraft gunners hit by machine-gun fire from the British fighters. The fighters also damaged four patrol craft and a large repair ship; the captain of an armed trawler was killed and 13 other sailors on board these vessels were wounded. Torstein Raaby of the Allied Secret Intelligence Service group in Alta reported a few hours after the raid, that there had been no civilian casualties and that the local population was "... extremely impressed by the bombing". A report six days after the operation relayed that the Germans thought that it would take months to repair the damage inflicted on Tirpitz.

=== Subsequent operations ===
Grand Admiral Karl Dönitz, the commander of the Kriegsmarine, directed that the damage caused to Tirpitz during Tungsten be repaired. Although the battleship was no longer capable of operating against Allied convoys for lack of air support, it was considered desirable to retain her in service to tie down Allied naval resources. Repair work began in early May after a destroyer transported equipment and workmen to Kaafjord from Germany; Tirpitz was able to steam under her own power by 2 June. She was capable of undertaking gunnery practice by the end of June, and all repairs were completed in mid-July. During this period the battleship's anti-aircraft armament was increased with more 20-millimetre (0.79 in) cannon, modifying the 150 mm guns so they could be used against aircraft and supplying anti-aircraft ammunition for her 380-millimetre (15 in) main guns. The defences of Kaafjord were improved with more radar stations and observation posts; the number of smoke generators around Tirpitz was increased.

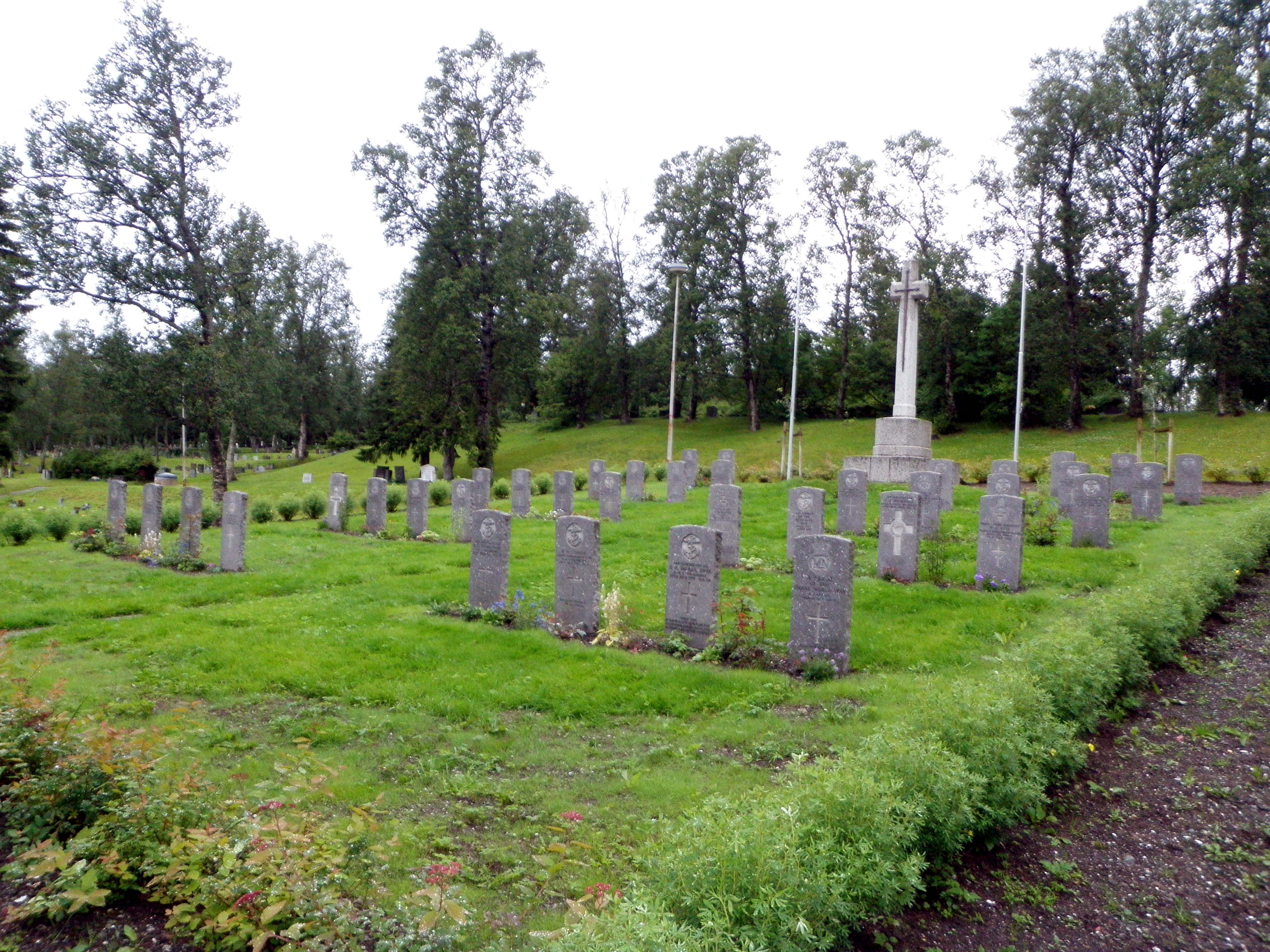
Five of the British airmen who died during Operation Tungsten are interred at the Commonwealth War Graves section of Tromsø's main cemetery

British intelligence assessed that Tirpitz would be repaired within six months and Cunningham directed Fraser on 13 April to launch another attack on the battleship. While Cunningham did not believe that Barracudas could carry weapons capable of sinking Tirpitz, he hoped that further air strikes would increase the period the battleship was out of service and harm her crew's morale. Fraser initially resisted Cunningham's order, arguing that the prospects for a successful raid were poor as the Germans would have reinforced the defences around Tirpitz and weather conditions were likely to be worse than those of Tungsten. He relented, and Moore sailed from Scapa Flow on 21 April to attack Kaafjord again. Operation Planet, was called off on 24 April due to bad weather over the target.

Operation Brawn and Operation Tiger Claw, were cancelled on 15 and 28 May respectively because of adverse weather. Further carrier raids were attempted in July and August after Allied intelligence determined that the repairs to Tirpitz were near complete. During Operation Mascot a force of 42 Barracudas and 40 fighters attacked Tirpitz on 17 July, but did not score any hits as the battleship was hidden by a smokescreen. A further four carrier raids were conducted against Kaafjord between 22 and 29 August during Operation Goodwood, but these caused only minor damage to the battleship.

In late August it was decided that Fleet Air Arm attacks should not continue as the Germans were able to cover Tirpitz in smoke before Barracudas could reach the battleship, and these aircraft could not carry bombs large enough to inflict severe damage. As it was still seen as desirable to destroy Tirpitz, the task was assigned to Bomber Command. On 15 September a force of heavy bombers in Operation Paravane attacked Kaafjord after refuelling at bases in northern Russia and inflicted irreparable damage on the battleship. Following this, Tirpitz sailed to an anchorage near Tromsø to be used as an immobile coastal defence battery. Operation Obviate, another heavy bomber attack on 29 October caused only minor damage and a third raid, Operation Catechism, was mounted on 12 November in which Tirpitz was struck by several Tallboy bombs and capsized with mass loss of life among her crew.

== Bibliography ==
- Barnett, Correlli (2000). Engage the Enemy More Closely: The Royal Navy in the Second World War (Classic Penguin ed.). London: Penguin Books. ISBN 978-0-14-139008-6.
- Bennett, G. H., ed. (2012). Hunting Tirpitz: Naval Operations Against Bismarck's Sister Ship. Plymouth: University of Plymouth Press. ISBN 978-1-84-102310-6.
  - Bennnett, G. H. Introduction. In Bennett (2012), pp. 7–25.
  - Bennett, G. H. "Naval Aircraft Attack on the Tirpitz (Operation 'Tungsten') 3 April 1944". In Bennett (2012), pp. 133–177.
- Bishop, Patrick (2012). Target Tirpitz. London: Harper Press. ISBN 978-0-00-743119-9.
- Blair, Clay (2000). Hitler's U-boat War: The Hunted, 1942–1945. New York: Modern Library. ISBN 978-0-67-964033-2.
- Brennecke, Jochen (1981). Schlachtschiff Tirpitz - Tatsachenbericht [Battleship Tirpitz - Factual Report]. Munich: Wilhelm Heyne Verlag. ISBN 978-3-45-300004-9.
- Brown, David (1977). Tirpitz: The Floating Fortress. London: Arms and Armour Press. ISBN 978-0-85-368341-4.
- Dear, I. C. B.; Foot, M. R. D., eds. (2005). "Arctic convoys". The Oxford Companion to World War II. Oxford: Oxford University Press. pp. 35–38. ISBN 978-0-19-280670-3.
- Faulkner, Marcus; Wilkinson, Peter (2012). War at Sea: A Naval Atlas, 1939–1945. Annapolis, MD: Naval Institute Press. ISBN 978-1-59-114560-8.
- Garzke, William H.; Dulin, Robert O. (1985). Battleships: Axis and Neutral Battleships in World War II. Annapolis, MD: Naval Institute Press. ISBN 978-0-87-021101-0.
- Hinsley, F. H.; Thomas, E. E.; Ransom, C. F. G.; Knight, R. C. (1984). British Intelligence in the Second World War: Its Influence on Strategy and Operations (Part I). History of the Second World War. Vol. III. London: HMSO. ISBN 978-0-11-630935-8.
- Levy, James P. (2003). The Royal Navy's Home Fleet in World War II. Houndmills: Palgrave Macmillan. ISBN 978-1-40-391773-7.
- Rohwer, Jürgen (2005). Chronology of the War at Sea: 1939–1945: The Naval History of World War Two (3rd rev. ed.). Annapolis, MD: Naval Institute Press. ISBN 978-1-59-114119-8.
- Rørholt, Bjørn; Thorsen, Bjarne (1990). Usynlige soldater: nordmenn i Secret Service forteller [Invisible soldiers: Norwegians in the Secret Service tell] (in Norwegian). Oslo: Aschehoug. ISBN 978-8-20-316046-2.
- Roskill, S.W. (1960). The War at Sea 1939–1945: The Offensive Part I. Vol. III. London: HMSO. OCLC 58588186.
- Tillman, Barrett (1996). Hellcat Aces of World War 2. London: Osprey Publishing. ISBN 978-1-85-532596-8.
- Woodman, Richard (2004). The Arctic Convoys: 1941–1945 (Paperback ed.). London: John Murray. ISBN 978-0-71-956617-2.
- Zetterling, Niklas; Tamelander, Michael (2009). Tirpitz: The Life and Death of Germany's Last Super Battleship. Philadelphia: Casemate. ISBN 978-1-93-514918-7.
