= HMS Furious =

Five ships of the Royal Navy have been named HMS Furious:

- HMS Furious (1797) was a 12-gun Courser-class gun-brig launched in 1797 and sold in 1802.
- HMS Furious (1804) was a 12-gun Archer-class gun-brig launched in 1804 and sold in 1815.
- HMS Furious (1850) was a wooden-hulled paddle frigate launched in 1850. She was hulked in 1867 and sold in 1884.
- HMS Furious (1896) was an Arrogant-class second class protected cruiser launched in 1896. She was hulked in 1915 and renamed Forte, and was sold in 1923.
- HMS Furious (47) was a modified Courageous-class battlecruiser launched in 1916. She was converted to a flush-deck aircraft carrier between 1921 and 1925 and was sold in 1948.

== Battle honours ==
Ships named Furious have earned the following battle honours:

- Crimea, 1854−56
- China, 1856−60
- Narvik, 1940
- Norway, 1940−41, 1944
- Malta Convoys, 1942
- North Africa, 1942−43

== See also ==
- HMS Furieuse
