= Blackburn Airedale =

Airedale
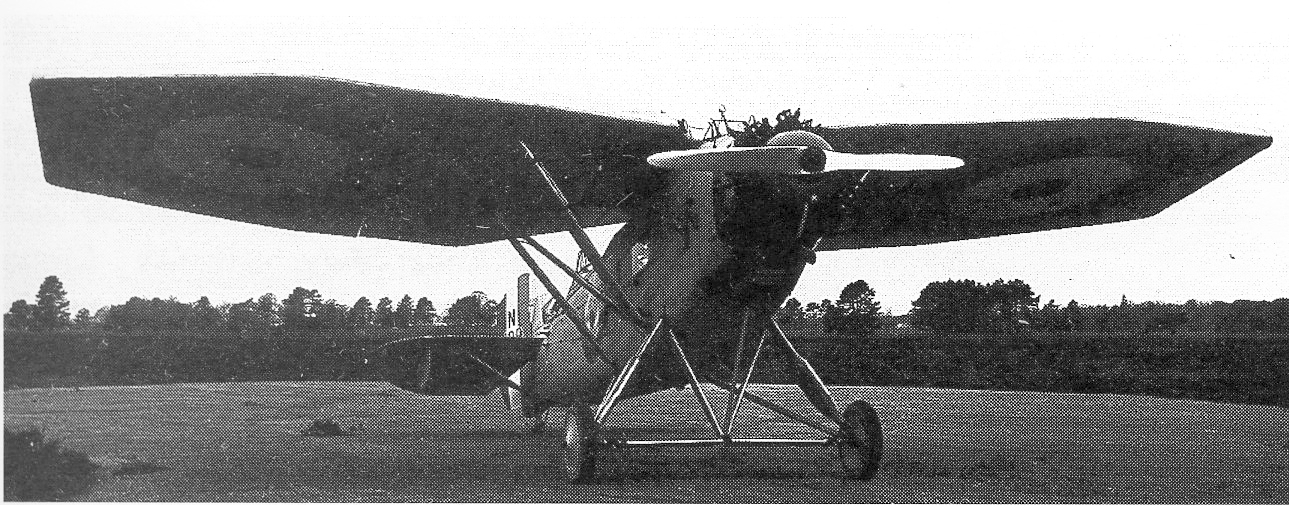
- The second Airedale, with tail and undercarriage modifications

General information
- Type: 3-seat reconnaissance
- National origin: United Kingdom
- Manufacturer: Blackburn Aeroplane and Motor Co. Ltd
- Designer: F.A.Bumpas
- Number built: 2

History
- First flight: 1924

The Blackburn R.2 Airedale was a single-engine three-seat monoplane deck-landing aircraft for land and sea reconnaissance, built in the UK in 1924. Only two were built.

== Development ==
The Airedale was designed by F.A.Bumpus to Air Ministry specifications R.37/22 calling for a three-seat deck-landing reconnaissance aircraft intended to replace the Fleet Air Arm's Blackburn B.1 Blackburn and the Avro 555 Bison. Unlike the B.1, it was a monoplane with a high wing for good visibility.

The wooden-sparred thick wing was of low aspect ratio, with a maximum chord section of about 38% of the span. This chord was maintained from about ¼-½ the span with a much narrower centre section to improve vision; the wingtips were very square. The wings, braced with N-type struts to the fuselage, could be folded by rotation around an inclined axis so that they lay chord-vertical alongside the fuselage for storage aboard an aircraft carrier.

The fuselage was of semi-monocoque construction with ash longerons and a plywood covering. At the front was a metal mounting for the uncowled 385 hp (286 kW) Armstrong Siddeley Jaguar III radial engine and at the rear an empennage similar to that of the B.1. The second prototype carried small stabilising fins on the underside of the tailplane. The main undercarriage was of the single axle type complemented by a tailskid. During development the undercarriage was strengthened with two extra struts forward of the main axle which carried arrestor claws at each end for deck-landing. These engaged with the fore and aft wires used on Royal Navy carriers up to 1926.

The pilot sat in an open cockpit forward of the wing for optimum visibility during deck landings and behind him in an enclosed, windowed cabin were the navigator and wireless operator, who could access an open gunner's position further aft. The pilot was able to enter the cabin if needed, in which case the navigator could fly the aircraft from a rear folding seat provided with duplicate controls.

== Operational history ==
Two Airedales were built, the first in 1924 for trials against the Hawker Hedgehog. It crashed after these trials and a second Airedale went to Martlesham Heath for testing in 1926. It was judged not to offer sufficient performance advantage over the B.1 and the Bison, and no orders followed. Blackburn considered a biplane derivative with a more powerful engine, the R.3A, but this remained on the drawing board.

== Specifications ==
Data from Jackson 1968, p. 214

General characteristics

- Crew: three
- Length: 36 ft 4 in (11.07 m)
- Wingspan: 43 ft 0 in (14.02 m)
- Height: 14 ft 3 in (4.34 m)
- Gross weight: 4,942 lb (2,242 kg)
- Powerplant: 1 × Armstrong Siddeley Jaguar III 14-cylinder two row radial , 385 hp (286 kW)

Performance

- Maximum speed: 120 mph (193 km/h, 100 kn) at sea level

Armament

- forward firing (through propeller) 0.5 in (12.7 mm) Vickers machine gun
- 0.303 in (7.7 mm) Lewis gun on Scarff ring in gunner's cockpit
