= 1921 in aviation =

This is a list of aviation-related events from 1921:

== Events ==
- Mexicana de Aviación begins service.
- The Imperial Japanese Navy acquires its first rigid and semi-rigid airships.
- In an early experiment with the use of airplanes to attack large ships at sea, French Navy Capitaine de corvette (Corvette Captain) Paul Teste makes a shallow mock dive-bombing attack on the battleship Bretagne during fleet maneuvers and places a dummy practice bomb only 20 metres (22 yards) off Bretagne's bow. Teste's plane crashes into the sea during his pullout maneuver, but he survives unharmed.
- The Italian General Giulio Douhet publishes his highly influential book Command of the Air. In it, he argues that the ability of aircraft to fly over armies and navies renders those forces of secondary importance; that the vastness of the sky makes defense against bombers impossible; that only offensive bombing to destroy the enemy's air force can allow a country to achieve command of the air; that once it is achieved, a bombing campaign can be carried out against enemy "vital centers", including industry, transportation, government, communications, and "the will of the people;" and that success against enemy civilian morale in particular would be the key to victory.
- When the Italian Chief of the Naval Staff Admiral Paolo Thaon di Revel argues for the development of aircraft carriers, saying "the development and use of aeroplanes in wars on our seas and along our coasts is today the most essential element of national defense," Minister of the Navy Admiral Giovanni Sechi replies that aircraft carriers are unnecessary in an enclosed sea like the Mediterranean and that a perfectly good substitute for them is "a well-organized network of coastal air stations."

=== January ===
- January 6 – After modifications, HMS Argus returns to service with the Royal Navy as the world's first aircraft carrier equipped with palisades. Installed on the port and starboard edges of the flight deck and capable of being raised and lowered, the palisades when raised serve as a windbreak and prevent aircraft on the flight deck from blowing or rolling overboard in heavy weather.

=== February ===
- Concerned that the transcontinental U.S. Air Mail service established in September 1920 had turned out to be little faster – although much more expensive – than train-only service because the United States lacks a system of lighted navigation beacons, meaning that air mail pilots could not fly safely at night and trains had to carry air mail along the route during the hours of darkness, Assistant Postmaster General of the United States Otto Praeger stages four experimental day-and-night air mail flights as a publicity stunt before incoming President Warren G. Harding can take office on March 4 and appoint his successor. The flights consist of two eastbound and two westbound trips between New York City and San Francisco, California. The two westbound flights become stranded in Dubois, Pennsylvania, and Chicago, Illinois. The first eastbound flight ends in tragedy when the de Havilland DH-4B carrying the mail stalls and crashes after takeoff from Elko, Nevada. The only real success is by the second eastbound flight, whose pilot manages to fly at night from North Platte, Nebraska, to Chicago.
- February 10 – The United States Army Air Service′s Air Service School at Langley Field, Virginia, is renamed the Air Service Field Officers School.
- February 26 – French pilot Adrienne Bolland sets an altitude record of 4,850 metres (15,910 ft) in a Caudron G.3 flying from Buenos Aires.

=== March ===
- A fire destroys much of the Air Services Medical Research Laboratory in Mineola, New York.
- March 4 – The first sustained flight of the Caproni Ca.60 Transaereo nine-wing flying boat prototype ends in a crash into the surface of Lake Maggiore.
- March 22 – A Portuguese Naval Aviation Felixstowe F.3 flying boat makes the first flight between Continental Portugal and Madeira. Its four-man crew includes Sacadura Cabral and Gago Coutinho.
- March 27–28 – The Italian Fascist newspaper Il Popolo d'Italia co-sponsors a conference in Milan that calls for the Government of Italy to establish an independent air ministry and concludes that "the air force is about to become the decisive arm in the future conflicts between peoples and therefore the means must be readied to safeguard the command of our skies."
- March 28 – The Government of Australia creates the Civil Aviation Branch as a component of the Department of Defence.
- March 31 – The Australian Air Force is formed as an independent air force.

=== April ===
- Phoebe Fairgrave becomes the first woman to perform a double parachute drop when she jumps from an airplane, opens a parachute, cuts it loose, free-falls, then opens a second parachute.
- April 1 – French pilot Adrienne Bolland flies a Caudron G.3 from Mendoza, Argentina, to Santiago, the first flight across the Andes by a woman.
- April 11 – Bert Hinkler sets a new distance record in Australia, flying an Avro Baby 800 miles (1,288 km) from Sydney to Bundaberg in 8 hours 40 minutes.
- April 18 – The first military flight in Honduras takes place when an American pilot under contract to the Honduran military flies a Bristol F.2b Fighter.

=== May ===
- American stunt pilot Laura Bromwell sets a women's aviation speed record of 135 mph (217 km/h) over a 2-mile (3.2 km) course.
- The French airline Société Générale de Transports Aérien (SGTA) extends its Paris-Brussels route to Amsterdam. It uses the Farman F.60 Goliath on the route.
- May 2 – Italian World War I ace Giovanni Ancillotto makes a flight across the Andes in Peru, flying from Lima to Cerro de Pasco in an Ansaldo A.1 Balilla in 1 hour 35 minutes, after which he spends 15 minutes flying over Cerro de Pasco before landing. He makes the flight at an average altitude of 5,500 meters (18,044 feet), reaches a maximum altitude of 7,000 meters (22,966 feet) while passing Mount Meiggs, and covers the 123-kilometer (76-mile) portion of the flight from Lima to La Oroya at an average speed of 230 km/h (143 mph).
- May 13 – Italian Fascist leader Benito Mussolini qualifies as a pilot.
- May 15 – Laura Bromwell sets a women's record for consecutive loops, looping her airplane 199 consecutive times in 1 hour 20 minutes over New York State.
- May 24 – French pilot Adrienne Bolland flies a Caudron G.3 from Buenos Aires, Argentina, to Montevideo, Uruguay. It is the first flight over the length of the Río de la Plata by a woman.
- May 25 – The Belgian airline Société Nationale pour l'Etude des Transports Aériens (SNETA) opens a Brussels-Croydon Airport (London) route, using the Farman F.60 Goliath.

=== June ===
- Boeing wins a $1,448,000 contract to build 200 Thomas-Morse MB-3 fighters for the US Army, allowing the company to abandon furniture-making.
- June 1 – On the second day of the Tulsa race massacre, whites in six biplane trainer aircraft from nearby Curtiss-Southwest Field attack African-Americans on the ground in the Greenwood section of Tulsa, Oklahoma, with rifles and incendiary bombs.
- June 5 – Twenty-four-year-old American stunt pilot Laura Bromwell dies in the crash of her Curtiss JN Canuck at Mitchel Field in Mineola, Long Island, New York, when she loses control at the top of a loop and her aircraft plummets into the ground from an altitude of 1,000 feet (305 m).
- June 8 – The United States Army Air Service carries out the first experiment in cabin pressurisation in a trial flight using a de Havilland DH.4 with a metal tank with a viewport built into the cockpit and serving as a pressure cabin. The pressure cabin malfunctions, rapidly overpressuring to −7,000 feet (−2,130 m) — i.e., 7,000 feet (2,130 m) below sea level — and its air compressor pumps air into the cabin more rapidly than it can escape, driving the cabin temperature up to 150 °F (66 °C). In extreme discomfort, the pilot barely lands the plane, and further experimentation is abandoned.
- June 13 – The U.S. Army and United States Navy begin trials in Chesapeake Bay to test the effectiveness of aircraft in attacking ships. The captured German destroyer G-102, light cruiser Frankfurt, and battleship Ostfriesland will all be sunk by aerial bombing during the tests.
- June 15 – 29-year-old Bessie Coleman, having attended flying school in France, gets her pilot's licence and becomes the first African American to earn an international pilot's licence.
- June 23 – Airco DH.10 Amiens aircraft of the Royal Air Force′s No. 216 Squadron begin an air mail service between Cairo and Baghdad.
- June 28 – The Air Navigation and Transport Act becomes law. It gives the British Empire authority over all air navigation in the British Commonwealth of Nations and their territories and puts the International Commission for Air Navigation into effect throughout the Commonwealth..

=== July ===
- Donald W. Douglas founds the Douglas Company.
- July 7 – Fire destroys the U.S. Navy blimp C-3 at Naval Air Station Hampton Roads in Norfolk, Virginia.
- July 10 – Flying from Curtiss Northwest Airport in Minnesota in a Curtiss Oriole piloted by her future husband, Vernon Omlie, Phoebe Fairgrave sets a world women's parachuting record, jumping from 15,200 feet (4,633 meters) and landing safely in a field near New Brighton, Minnesota.
- July 16 – The sixth annual Aerial Derby is held, sponsored by the Royal Aero Club, with a trophy and a £500 prize for the overall winner and prizes of £200, £100, and £50 for the first three places in the handicap competition. Nineteen participants fly over a 102.5-mile (165-kilometer) circuit beginning and ending at Hendon Aerodrome in London with control points at Brooklands, Esher, Purley, and Purfleet; the aircraft fly the circuit twice. J. H. James is both the overall winner and the winner of the handicap competition, completing the course in a Gloster Mars at an average speed of 163.34 mph (262.87 km/h) in 1 hour 18 minutes 10 seconds with a handicap of 4 minutes 42 seconds. However, Harry Hawker has been killed on July 12 in a crash while practising.
- July 21 – United States Army Air Service Martin NBS-1 bombers sink the decommissioned German battleship Ostfriesland in the Atlantic Ocean off the Virginia Capes after Billy Mitchell argued for bombing trials to show the power of aircraft to sink major warships.

=== August ===
- August 10 – The United States Department of the Navy establishes the Bureau of Aeronautics to oversee all matters relating to naval aircraft, personnel, and operations. United States Marine Corps aviation remains under a separate command, the Director of Aviation at Headquarters Marine Corps.
- August 11 – The 1921 Schneider Trophy race is flown at Venice, Italy. In an all-Italian field, Giovanni De Briganti wins the race in a Macchi M.7 with an average speed of 189.7 km/h (117.9 mph).
- August 13–14 – Charles Stouffer makes the first flight for a proposed interisland air service in Hawaii between the island of Hawaii and Oahu. Using a Curtiss Model N-9 floatplane, he takes off from Hilo with two passengers riding in the forward cockpit, drops off one passenger at Lahaina, Maui, and then flies to Molokai, where he and his remaining passenger spend the night due to strong headwinds before completing the flight to Honolulu.
- August 17 – Piloting a monoplane flying boat with three passengers aboard in a flight at Port Washington, New York, United States Navy Commander David McCullough claims an altitude record of 20,000 feet (6,096 m).
- August 24 – The British airship R-38 breaks up over Hull, Yorkshire, during trials, killing 44 of the 49 people on board.
- August 26 – 1921 SNETA Farman Goliath ditching: The first accident involving a Farman F.60 Goliath in civilian service occurs when a Goliath operated by the Syndicat National d'Étude des Transports Aériens (SNETA) suffers what a witness describes as an "explosion" and a structural collapse during a mail flight from Croydon Airport in the United Kingdom to Brussels-Evere Airport in Belgium. The plane ditches in the North Sea about 3 nautical miles (3.5 mi; 5.6 km) off Calais, France. Its two-man crew perishes, but the aircraft — whose wreckage later is reported to be off the coast of Belgium — is later salvaged, repaired, and returned to service.
- August 30 – Three Short aircraft of the naval aviation branch of the Chilean Army air corps carry out a successful mock raid from Valparaíso on Coquimbo. This will influence the eventual Chilean decision to separate naval aviation from army aviation.
- August 31
  - The Australian Air Force is renamed the Royal Australian Air Force.
  - A hangar fire at Naval Air Station Rockaway, New York, destroys the U.S. Navy blimps C-10, D-6, and H-1 and the kite balloon A-P.

=== September ===
- The British 30-man Sempill Mission, led by Sir William Francis Forbes-Sempill (Captain, the Master of Sempill), arrives in Japan, bringing with it over 100 aircraft comprising 20 different models. Before it returns to the United Kingdom in March 1923, the Mission will greatly improve Imperial Japanese Navy aviation training and understanding of aircraft carrier flight deck operations and the latest naval aviation tactics and technology, and the aircraft it brings will inspire the design of a number of Japanese naval aircraft of the 1920s.
- At Brussels, Farman Aviation Works test pilot Louis Bossoutrot wins the Simonet Cup in a Farman FF 65 Sport.
- September 17 – The first annual Air League Challenge Cup race is held as the final event in of the Royal Aero Club's first Aviation Race Meeting at Croydon Airport in London. Competitors race a total of 72 miles (116 km) over a three-lap course in teams of three, with each team member physically passing a baton to the next team member after completing one lap. Three Royal Air Force teams – dubbed "Red," "White," and "Blue" – are the only entrants, and the Red Team – from No. 24 Squadron at RAF Kenley – wins flying an SE.5a on the first and third laps and an Avro 504K on the second lap.
- September 19 – The first regular scheduled airline service in Latin America commences, with Colombian airline SCADTA operating float-equipped Junkers F.13s between Barranquilla and Girandot, Colombia.
- September 27 – A hangar fire at Evere Airfield in Evere, Belgium, destroys two SNETA Farman F.60 Goliaths (registration O-BLEU and O-BRUN).
- September 28 – Piloting the same United States Army Air Service Packard-Le Peré LUSAC-11 fighter that set a world altitude record on February 27, 1920, Lieutenant John A. Macready sets a new world altitude record of 10,518 meters (34,508 feet). Macready receives the Mackay Trophy for the flight.

=== October ===
- The Royal Air Force takes over from the British Army in assuming policing duties in Iraq.
- October 4 – At Long Branch, New Jersey, an inexperienced amateur stunt flier, Madeline Davis, attempts to become the first woman to attempt to transfer from a moving automobile to an airplane flying overhead via a rope ladder. She loses her grip on the ladder and is fatally injured.
- October 15 – The Spanish airline Compañía Española de Tráfico Aéreo is established. It will eventually form part of the airline Iberia.

=== November ===
- November 3 – Curtiss test pilot Bert Acosta wins the Pulitzer Trophy in a Curtiss CR-2 and establishes a new closed-circuit airspeed record of 284.36 km/h (176.7 mph).
- November 12–27 – The sixth Salon d'Aeronautique is held in Paris. The Breguet 19 is unveiled.
- November 19 – Flying a Curtiss CR-2, Bert Acosta sets a new world speed record of 197.8 mph (318.32 km/h).

=== December ===
- December 1 – The first flight of a helium-filled airship takes place, as the United States Navy's C-class blimp C-7 flies from Hampton Roads, Virginia, to Washington, D.C.
- December 5 – West Australian Airways commences the first regular air services in Australia.
- December 16 – USS Wright (AZ-1) is commissioned as the United States Navy's first and only balloon ship. She is the only U.S. Navy ship ever to bear the "AZ" designation for "lighter-than-air craft tender."
- December 29–30 – Edward "Eddie" Stinson and Lloyd W. Bertaud set a new unrefueled manned flight endurance record, remaining aloft in a Junkers-Larsen JL-6 over Roosevelt Field outside Mineola, New York, for 26 hours 19 minutes 35 seconds. It is the first flight endurance record recognized by the Fédération Aéronautique Internationale (FAI).

== First flights ==
- Avro 555 Bison
- Gloster Sparrowhawk
- Farman F.110
- Potez IX
- Thomas-Morse MB-7
- Early 1921
  - Junkers J 15
  - Westland Walrus
- Late 1921
  - Airco DH.9C
  - Thomas-Morse MB-10

=== January ===
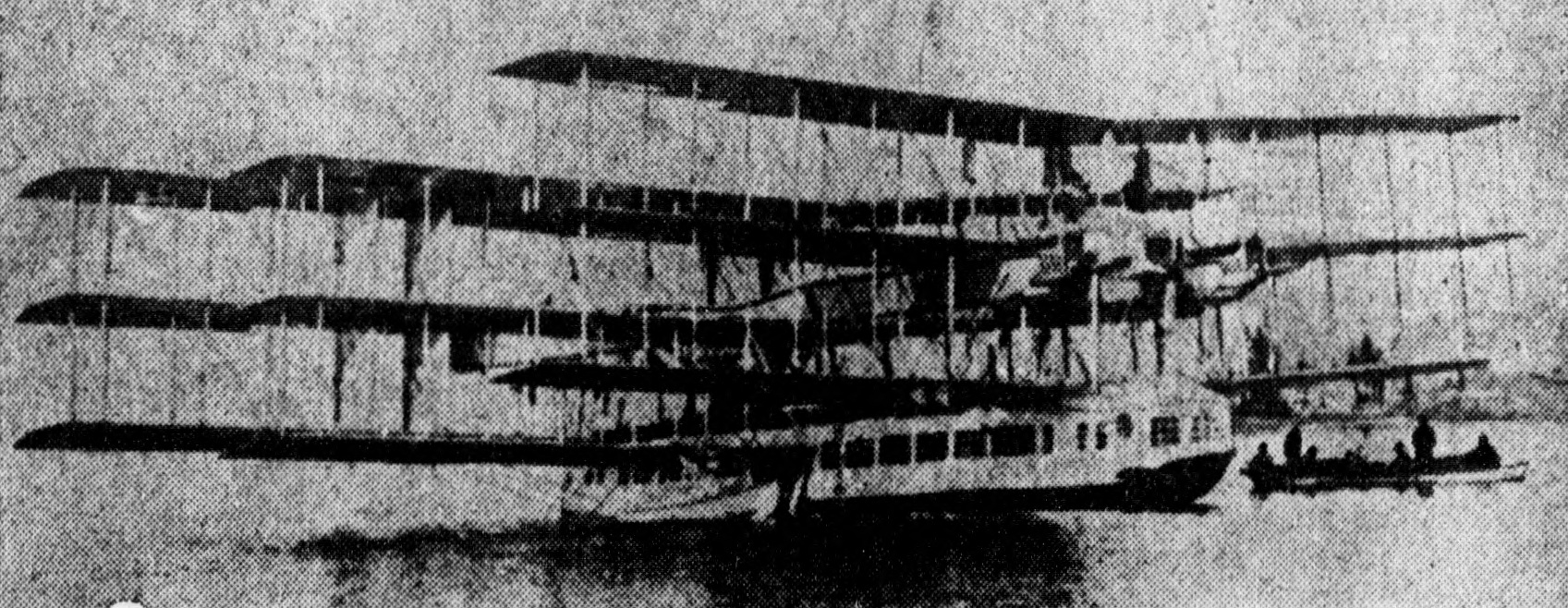
Caproni Ca.60

- Caproni Ca.60 (short hops only)
- Loening PW-2

=== February ===
- February 24 - Douglas Cloudster

=== March ===
- March 3 – Junkers K 16
- March 4 – Caproni Ca.60 (first sustained flight ends in crash)
- Armstrong Siddeley Siskin, precursor of the Armstrong Whitworth Siskin

=== April ===
- April 11 – Short Cromarty flying boat
- April 30 – Marinens Flyvebaatfabrikk M.F.6 floatplane

=== May ===
- Boeing GA-1

=== June ===
- June 16 – Blériot-SPAD S.46
- June 20 – Gloster Mars
- June 21 – Bristol Ten-seater
- June 23 – R38 class airship

=== July ===
- 5 July – de Havilland Doncaster
- 7 July – Fairey Pintail
- 16 July – Avro 551, prototype of the Avro 552

=== August ===
- 1 August – Curtiss CR-1
- 9 August – Curtiss CR-2

=== October ===
- Avro 549 Aldershot
- Mitsubishi 1MF
- Potez 15
- October 21 – Thomas-Morse MB-6, later redesignated Thomas-Morse R-2

=== November ===
- Engineering Division PW-1

== Entered service ==
- Gloster Sparrowhawk with the Imperial Japanese Navy aboard the battleship Yamashiro
- Westland Walrus with No. 3 Squadron, Royal Air Force

== Retirements ==
- July – Saunders Kittiwake
