= HMS Furious (47) =

British battlecruiser, 1916–1948

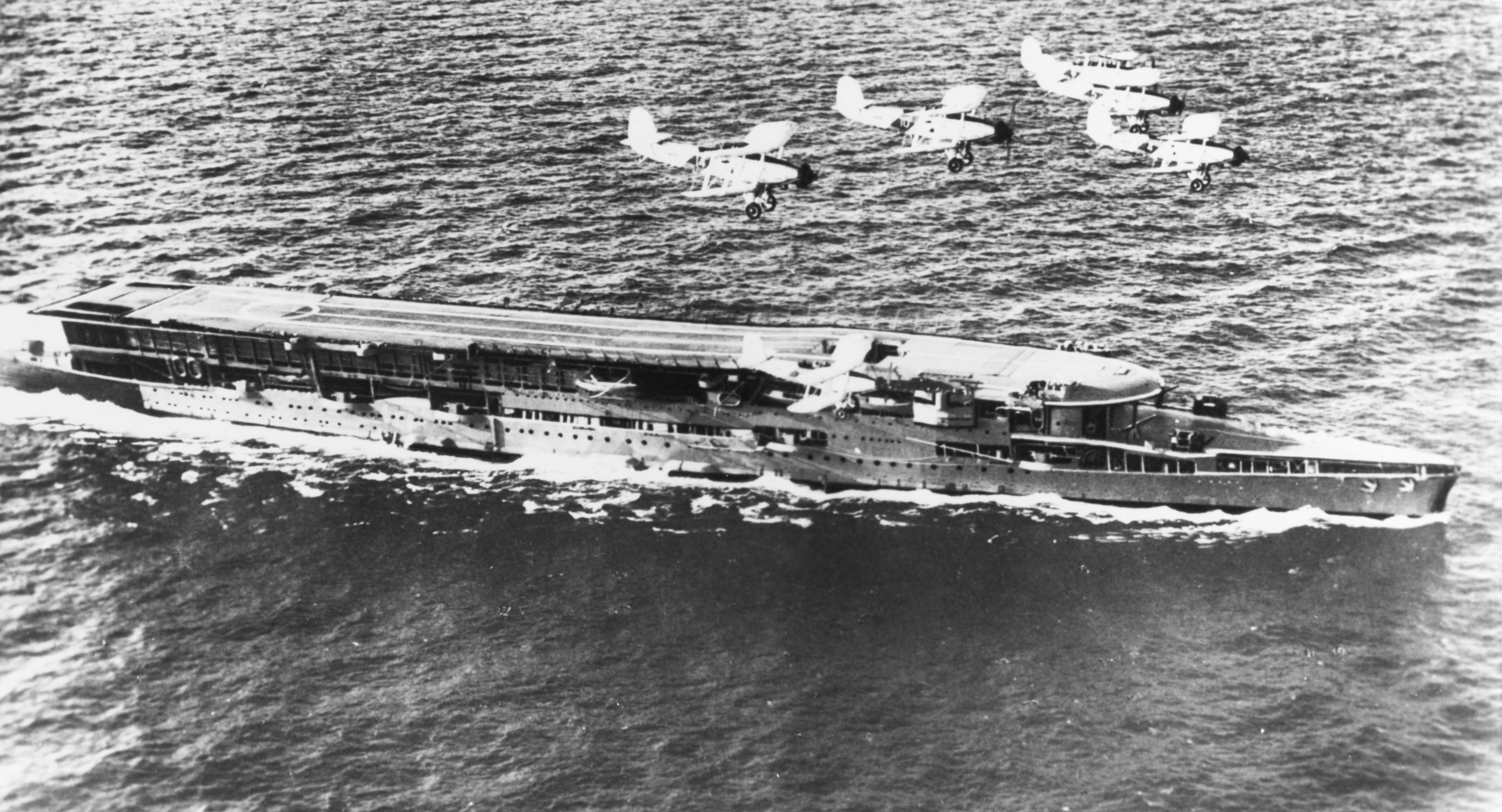
- Furious circa 1935–1936

History

United Kingdom
- Name: Furious
- Namesake: Fury
- Builder: Armstrong Whitworth, Wallsend
- Laid down: 8 June 1915
- Launched: 18 August 1916
- Commissioned: 26 June 1917
- Reclassified: As aircraft carrier, September 1925
- Identification: Pennant number: 47
- Motto: Ministrat arma furor (Latin: "Fury supplies arms")
- Nickname(s): Spurious
- Fate: Sold for scrap, 1948
- Badge: On a Black Field an eagle's head White, langued Red, armed Gold.

General characteristics
- Class & type: Courageous-class battlecruiser
- Displacement: 19,513 long tons (19,826 t) (normal); 22,890 long tons (23,257 t) (deep load)
- Length: 786 ft 9 in (239.8 m) (o/a)
- Beam: 88 ft (26.8 m)
- Draught: 24 ft 11 in (7.6 m)
- Installed power: 18 Yarrow boilers; 90,000 shp (67,113 kW)
- Propulsion: 4 shafts; 4 geared steam turbines
- Speed: 31.5 knots (58.3 km/h; 36.2 mph)
- Complement: 737 officers and ratings
- Armament: 2 × single 18 in (457 mm) guns; 11 × single 5.5 in (140 mm) guns; 2 × single 3 in (76 mm) AA guns; 2 × 21 in (533 mm) torpedo tubes
- Armour: Belt: 2–3 in (51–76 mm); Decks: .75–3 in (19–76 mm); Barbettes: 3–7 in (76–178 mm); Turrets: 7–9 in (178–229 mm); Conning tower: 10 in (254 mm); Torpedo bulkheads: 1–1.5 in (25–38 mm)

General characteristics (as completed in 1925)
- Class & type: Courageous-class aircraft carrier
- Displacement: 22,500 long tons (22,900 t); 26,500 long tons (26,900 t) (deep load)
- Length: 786 ft 9 in (239.8 m) (o/a)
- Beam: 88 ft (26.8 m)
- Draught: 27 ft 3 in (8.3 m)
- Installed power: 18 Yarrow boilers; 90,000 shp (67,000 kW)
- Propulsion: 4 shafts, 4 geared steam turbines
- Speed: 30 knots (56 km/h; 35 mph)
- Range: 7,480 nmi (13,850 km; 8,610 mi) at 10 knots (19 km/h; 12 mph)
- Complement: 795 (1939)
- Armament: 10 × single 5.5 in guns; 6 × single 4 in (102 mm) AA guns
- Armour: Belt: 2–3 in (51–76 mm); Decks: .75–1 in (19–25 mm); Bulkhead: 2–3 in (51–76 mm); Torpedo bulkheads: 1–1.5 in (25–38 mm)
- Aircraft carried: 36

HMS Furious was a modified Courageous-class battlecruiser built for the Royal Navy (RN) during the First World War. Designed to support the Baltic Project championed by the First Sea Lord, Lord Fisher, the ship was very lightly armoured and designed with a main battery of only two 18-inch (457 mm) guns. Furious was modified as an aircraft carrier while under construction. Her forward turret was removed and a flight deck was added in its place, such that aircraft had to manoeuvre around the superstructure to land. Later in the war, the ship had her rear turret removed and a second flight deck installed aft of the superstructure, but this was less than satisfactory due to air turbulence. Furious was briefly laid up after the war before she was reconstructed with a full-length flight deck in the early 1920s. Her half-sisters Courageous and Glorious were also rebuilt as aircraft carriers around that time.

After her conversion, Furious was used extensively for trials of naval aircraft, and later as a training ship once large, modern fleet carriers such as Ark Royal entered service in the 1930s. During the early months of the Second World War, the carrier spent her time hunting for German raiders in the North Atlantic and escorting convoys. This changed dramatically during the Norwegian Campaign in early 1940, when her aircraft provided air support to British troops ashore in addition to attacking German shipping. The first of what would be numerous aircraft ferry missions was made by the carrier during the campaign. After the withdrawal of British troops in May, Furious made several anti-shipping strikes in Norway with little result before beginning a steady routine of ferrying aircraft for the Royal Air Force.

At first, Furious made several trips to West Africa, but she began to ferry aircraft to Gibraltar in 1941. An unsuccessful attack on German-occupied ports on the Arctic Ocean interrupted the ferry missions in mid-1941. Furious was given a lengthy refit in the United States and spent a few months training after her return in April 1942. She made several more ferry trips in mid-1942 before her aircraft attacked airfields in Vichy French Algeria as part of the opening stages of Operation Torch in November 1942. The ship remained in the Mediterranean until February 1943 when she was transferred to the Home Fleet.

Furious spent most of 1943 training, but made a number of attacks on the German battleship Tirpitz and other targets in Norway during the first half of 1944. By September 1944, the ship was showing her age and she was placed in reserve. Furious was decommissioned in April 1945, but was not sold for scrap until 1948.

== Design and description ==
During the First World War, Admiral Fisher was prevented from ordering an improved version of the preceding Renown-class battlecruisers by a wartime restriction that banned construction of ships larger than light cruisers. To obtain ships suitable for traditional battlecruiser roles, such as scouting for fleets and hunting enemy raiders, he settled on ships with the minimal armour of a light cruiser and the armament of a battlecruiser. He justified their existence by claiming he needed fast, shallow-draught ships for his Baltic Project, a plan to invade Germany via its Baltic coast.

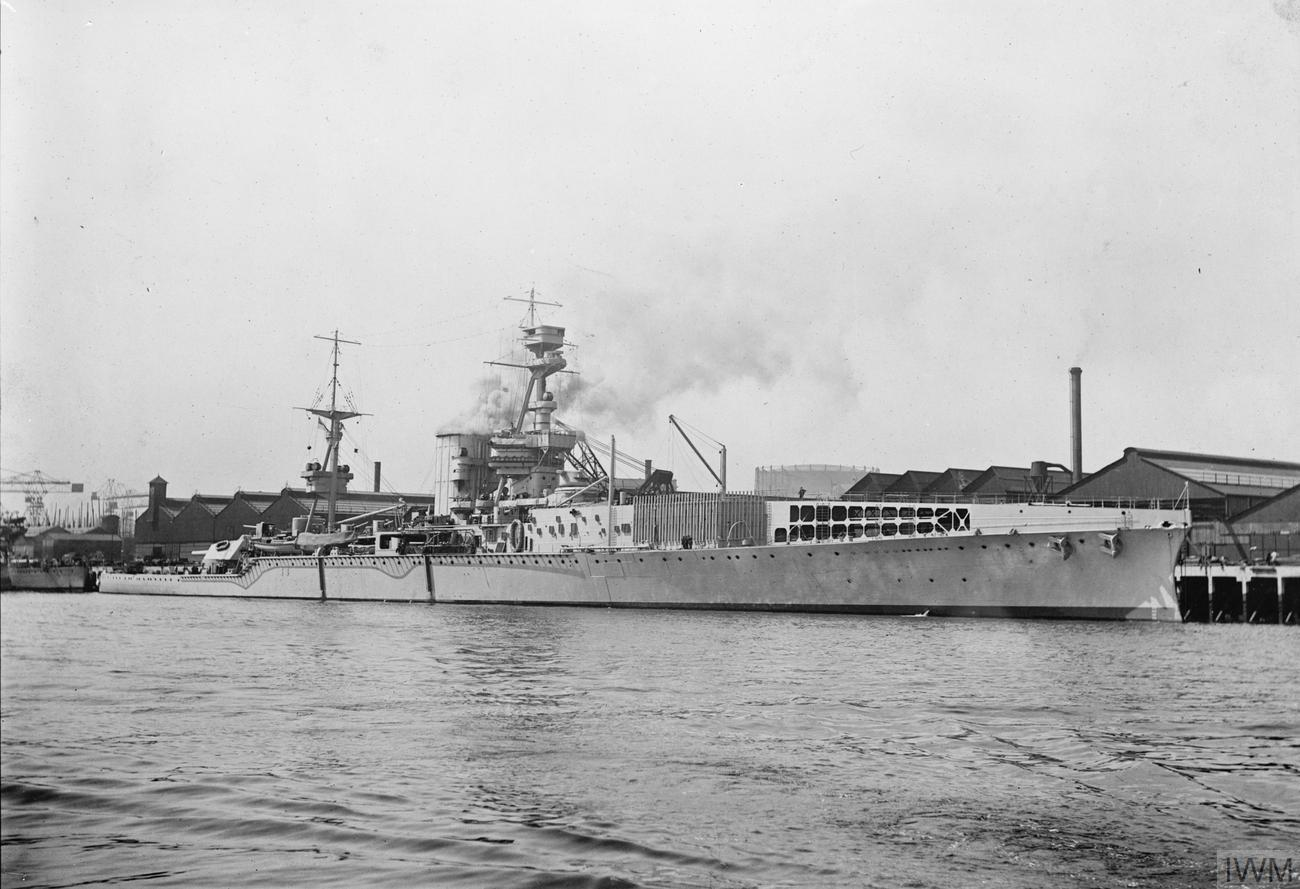
Furious as originally completed with a flying-off deck for aircraft forward

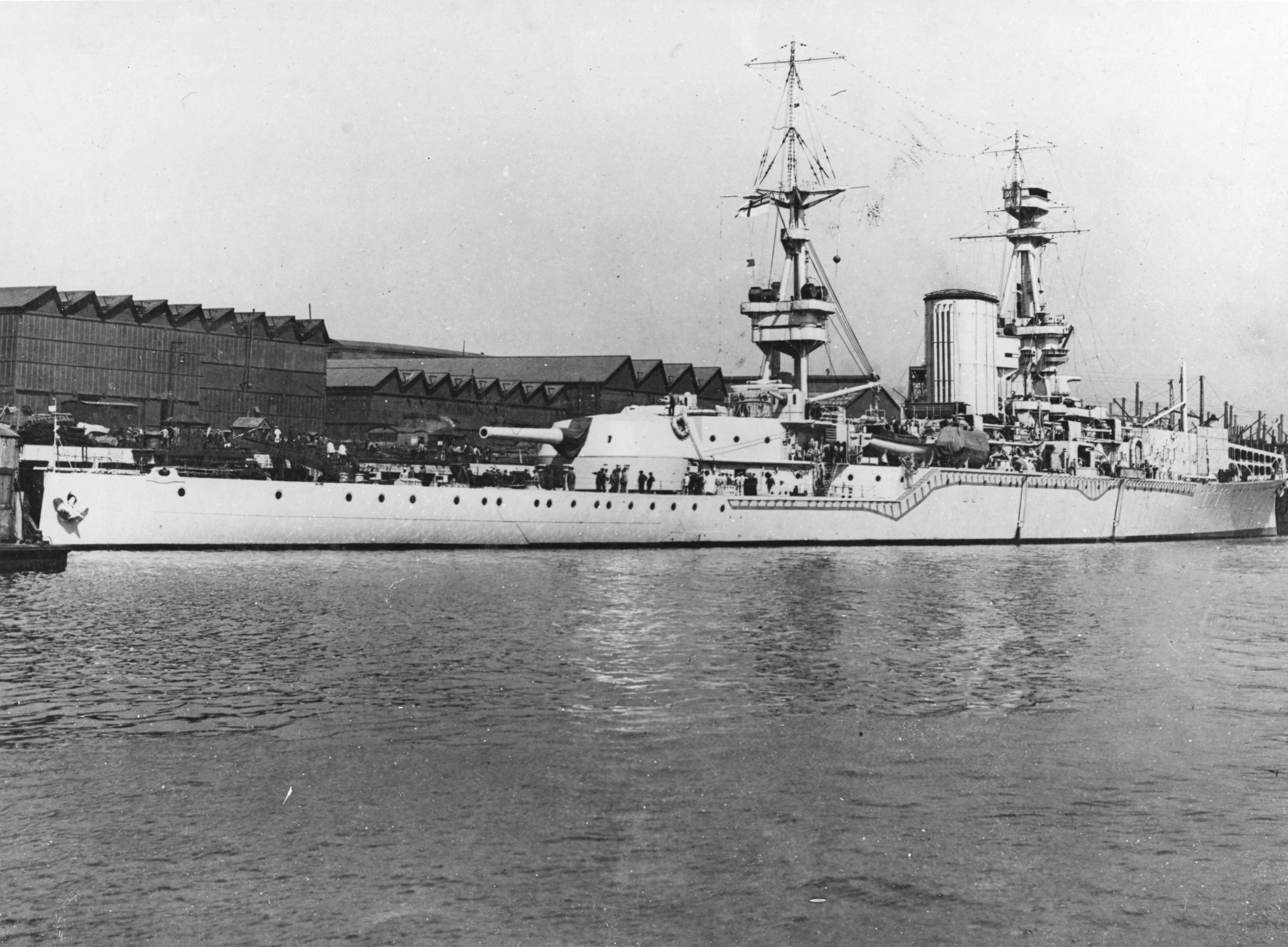
Stern view of Furious in 1917, showing the ship's single 18-inch gun

Furious had an overall length of 786 feet 9 inches (239.8 m), a beam of 88 feet (26.8 m), and a draught of 24 feet 11 inches (7.6 m) at deep load. She displaced 19,513 long tons (19,826 t) normally and 22,890 long tons (23,257 t) at deep load. She had a metacentric height of 5.33 feet (1.6 m) at deep load. Furious and her half-sisters were the first large warships in the Royal Navy to have geared steam turbines. To save design time, the installation used in the light cruiser Champion, the first cruiser in the RN with geared turbines, was copied and simply duplicated to provide two sets of turbines. The four Brown-Curtis turbines were powered by eighteen Yarrow small-tube boilers that were designed to produce a total of 90,000 shaft horsepower (67,000 kW). The ship's speed was an estimated 31.5 knots (58.3 km/h; 36.2 mph), but she never ran her sea trials.

Furious was designed to normally carry 750 long tons (762 t) of fuel oil, but could carry a maximum of 3,160 long tons (3,211 t). At full capacity, she could steam for an estimated 6,000 nautical miles (11,000 km; 6,900 mi) at a speed of 20 knots (37 km/h; 23 mph). The ship was designed to carry two BL 18-inch Mark I guns in two single turrets, one each fore ('A') and aft ('Y'). Her secondary armament consisted of 11 BL 5.5 in (140 mm) Mk I guns. A pair of quick-firing (QF) 3-inch (76 mm) 20 cwt (Note: "Cwt" is the abbreviation for hundredweight, 20 cwt referring to the weight of the gun.) anti-aircraft guns were mounted before the funnel. Furious was also fitted with two submerged tubes for 21-inch (533 mm) torpedoes for which 10 torpedoes were carried.

Even as she was being built, Furious was modified with a large hangar capable of housing ten aircraft on her forecastle that replaced the forward turret. A 160-foot (49 m) flight deck was built along its roof. Aircraft were flown off and, rather less successfully, landed on this deck. Floatplanes like the Short Type 184 used a four-wheel trolley that ran down a track along the centre of the flight deck for take-off. Aircraft were lifted by crane from the hangar to the flight deck. Although the aft turret was fitted and the gun tested, it was not long before Furious returned to her builders for further modifications. In November 1917, the rear turret was replaced by a 300-foot (91 m) deck for landing aircraft over another hangar. Her funnel and superstructure remained intact, with a narrow strip of decking around them to connect the fore and aft flight decks. Turbulence from the funnel and superstructure was severe enough that only three landing attempts were successful before further attempts were forbidden. Her 18-inch guns were reused on the Lord Clive-class monitors General Wolfe and Lord Clive during the war.

Furious was laid down on 8 June 1915 at Armstrong Whitworth's Low Walker shipyard in Newcastle upon Tyne. The ship was launched on 18 August 1916 and commissioned on 26 June 1917. As completed, her complement numbered 737 officers and ratings.

== Aircraft landing and the First World War ==
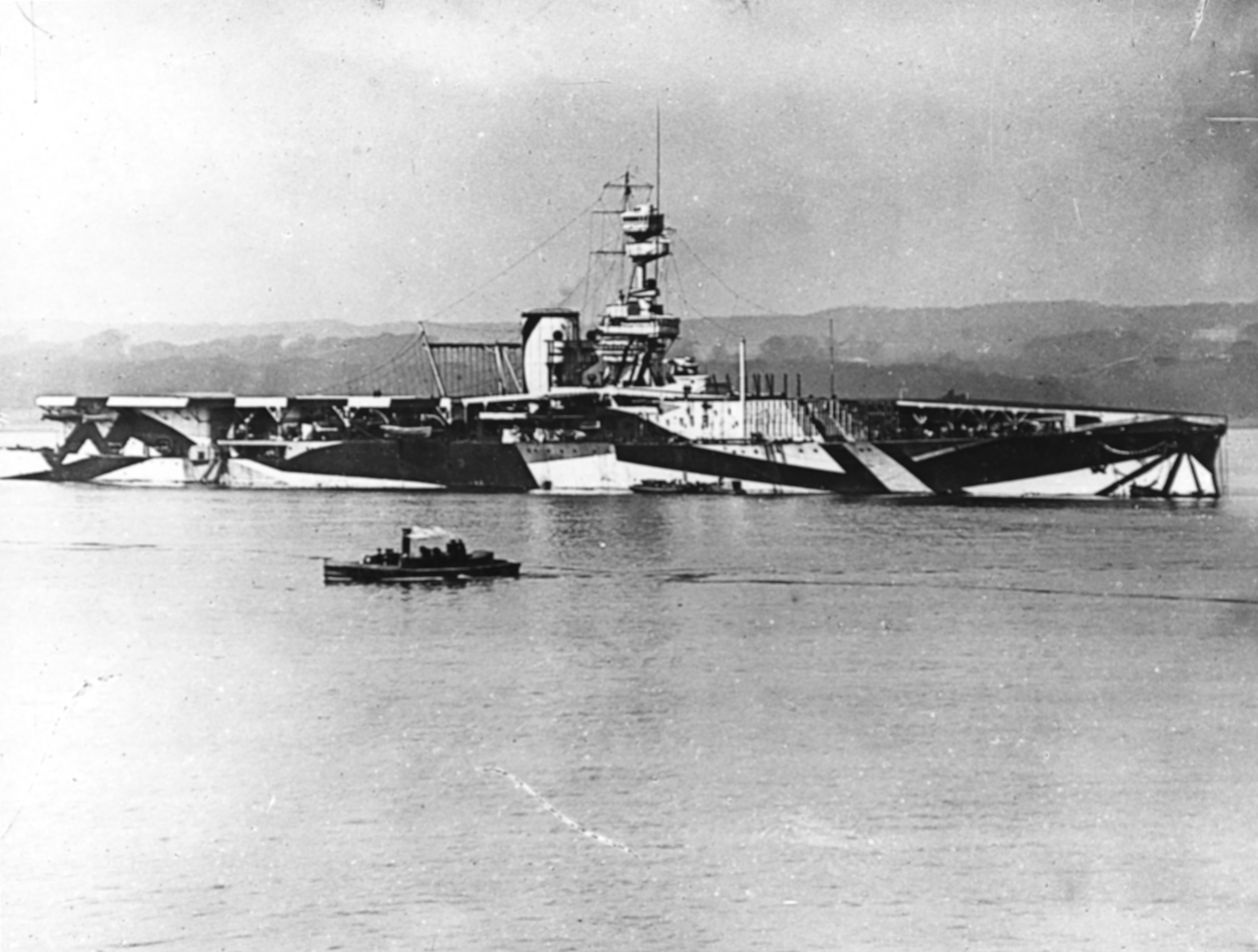
Furious seen in 1918, after being fitted with an aft landing deck

On 2 August 1917, while performing trials, Squadron Commander Edwin Dunning landed a Sopwith Pup on Furious, becoming the first person to land an aircraft on a moving ship. On 7 August, he made another landing in the same manner, but on his third attempt the engine choked and the aircraft crashed off the starboard bow into the sea. Knocked unconscious, he drowned in the cockpit. The deck arrangement was unsatisfactory because aircraft had to manoeuvre around the superstructure to land. Dunning's replacement as the head of Furious' air group, Frederick Rutland, performed a landing in the same manner as Dunning, after which he stopped these experiments, reporting to the Admiralty that the average lifespan of a pilot making a landing like this would be ten landings, in good weather.

The three Courageous-class ships were assigned to the 1st Cruiser Squadron (CS) in October 1917 when the Admiralty received word of German ship movements on 16 October, possibly indicating a raid. Admiral David Beatty, commander of the Grand Fleet, ordered most of his light cruisers and destroyers to sea to locate the enemy ships. Furious was detached from the 1st CS and ordered to sweep along the 56th parallel as far as 4° East and to return before dark. Courageous and Glorious were sent to reinforce the 2nd Light Cruiser Squadron patrolling the central part of the North Sea later that day. Two German Brummer-class light cruisers managed to slip through the gaps in the British patrols and destroyed the Scandinavia convoy during the morning of 17 October, but no word was received of the engagement until that afternoon. The 1st CS was ordered to intercept the German ships, but they proved to be faster than expected and the British ships were unsuccessful.

Furious returned to the dockyard in November to have the aft turret removed and replaced by another deck for landing, giving her both a launching and a recovery deck. Two lifts (elevators) serving the hangars were also installed. Furious was recommissioned on 15 March 1918, and her embarked aircraft were used on anti-Zeppelin patrols in the North Sea after May. In July 1918, she flew off seven Sopwith Camels which participated in the Tondern raid, attacking the Zeppelin sheds there with moderate success.

== Conversion ==
=== Overview ===
Furious was laid up after the war, but was converted to an aircraft carrier with a continuous flight deck between June 1921 and September 1925. Her design was based on experience gained with the first two British carriers, Argus and Eagle, although this was very limited as Argus was less than three years old and Eagle had carried out only 143 deck landings during her preliminary sea trials in 1920.

The ship's superstructure, masts, funnel and landing deck were removed and she was given a 576-by-92-foot (175.6 by 28.0 m) flight deck that extended over three-quarters of her length. This flight deck was not level; it sloped upwards about three-quarters of the way from the stern to help slow down landing aircraft, which had no brakes at that time. The fore-and-aft 320-foot (97.5 m) arresting gear was not intended to stop landing aircraft—the landing speeds of the time were low enough that this was unnecessary given a good headwind—but rather to prevent aircraft from veering off to one side and potentially falling off the flight deck. Various designs for the flight deck were tested in a wind tunnel by the National Physical Laboratory which showed that the distinctive elliptical shape and rounded edges used minimised turbulence.

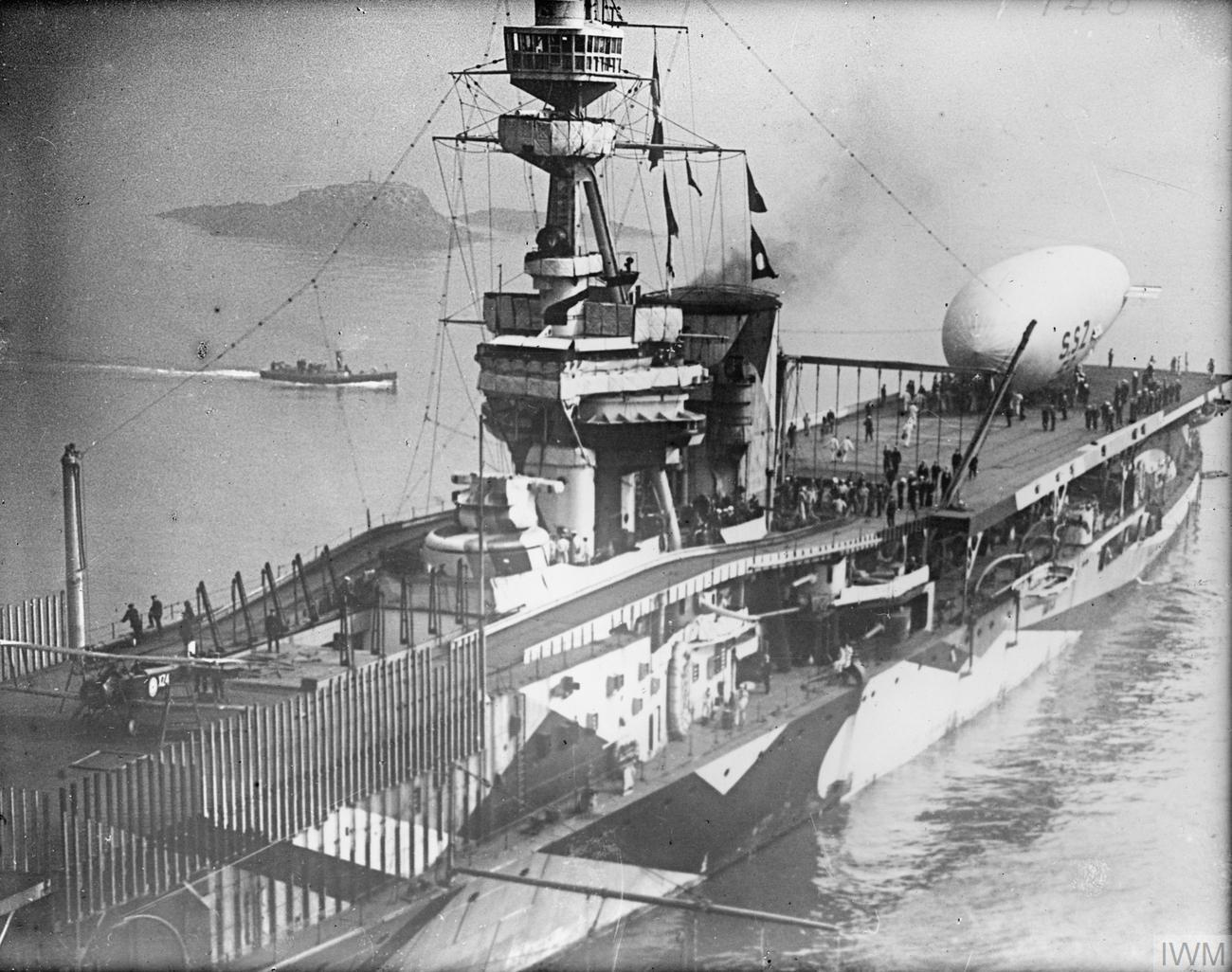
Closeup of the ship shortly following its initial conversion and in dazzle paint scheme. An SSZ class blimp is on the after deck

Furious was not lengthened, but her beam was increased 1 foot (0.3 m) to 89 feet .75 inches (27.1 m) and her average draught was now 27 feet 3 inches (8.3 m) at deep load, 2 feet (0.6 m) deeper than before the conversion. She displaced 22,500 long tons (22,861 t) at normal load and 26,500 long tons (26,925 t) at deep load, over 3000 long tons more than her previous displacement. Her metacentric height was 3.6 feet (1.1 m) at deep load, a reduction of 1.48 feet (0.5 m) after her conversion. During the ship's post-conversion sea trials she reached 30.03 knots (55.62 km/h; 34.56 mph). Her fuel capacity was increased by 700 long tons (710 t) during her reconstruction, which increased her range to 5,300 nautical miles (9,800 km; 6,100 mi) at a speed of 16 knots (30 km/h; 18 mph) or 7,480 nautical miles (13,850 km; 8,610 mi) at a speed of 10 knots (19 km/h; 12 mph).

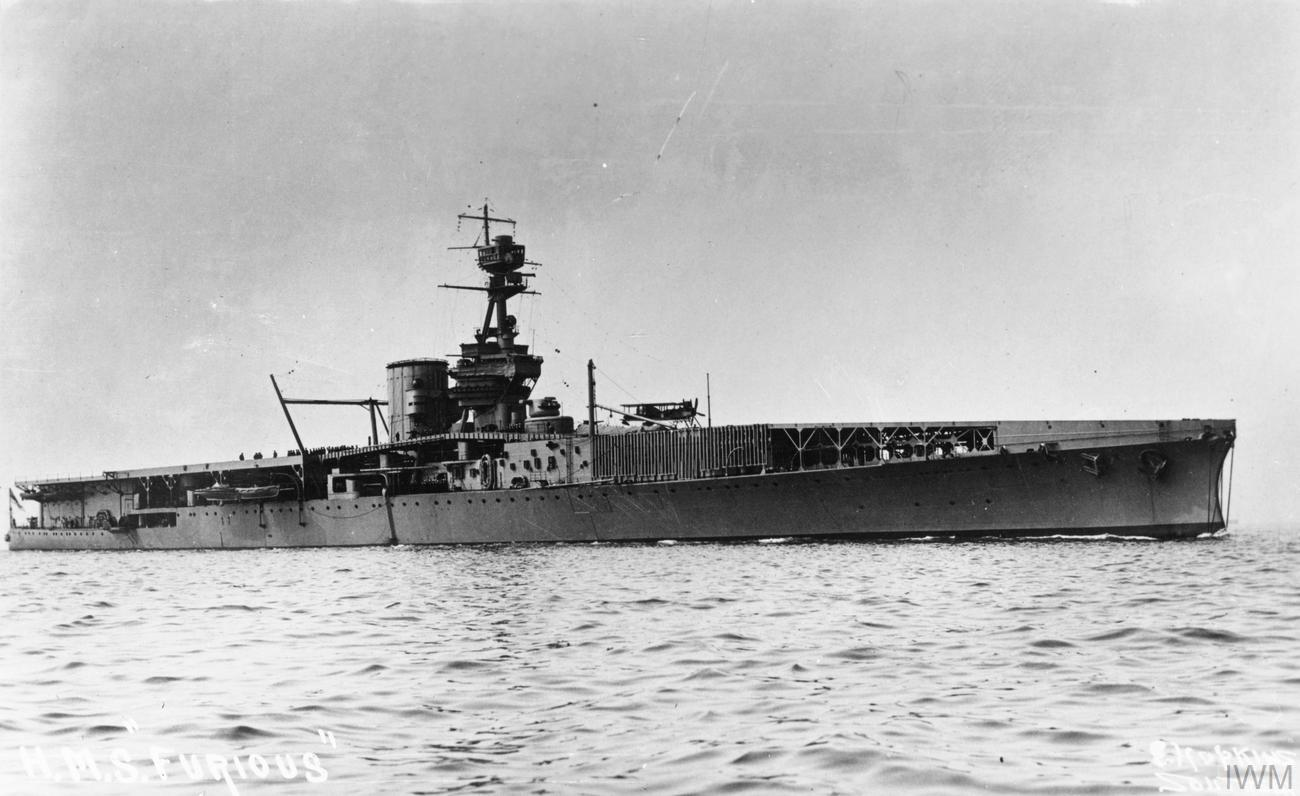
Aircraft on deck

A two-level hangar was built under the flight deck, 15 feet (4.6 m) in height per level. The lower hangar was 550 feet (167.6 m) long by 35–50 feet (10.7–15.2 m) wide and the upper was 520 by 50 feet (158.5 by 15.2 m). Each hangar could be sectioned off by electrically operated steel shutters on rollers. Her boilers were ducted down the side of the ship to exhaust either out of gratings at the rear of the flight deck or, when landing operations were in progress, out of the side of the lower hangar at the rear of the ship. This solution proved to be very unsatisfactory as it consumed valuable space, made parts of the lower hangar unbearable and interfered with landing operations to a greater or lesser degree. Her original flying-off deck remained in place for use by small aircraft like fighters which improved launch and recovery cycle flexibility allowing the ship to simultaneously land aircraft on the main flight deck while fighters were taking off on the lower deck or to speedily fly off her aircraft from both decks. Doors at the forward end of the upper hangar opened onto the lower flying deck. Like Argus, Furious was flush-decked and lacked an island superstructure to minimise any turbulence over the flight deck; instead she had a navigating position at the leading edge of the flight deck, starboard, and was provided with a retractable charthouse forward, on the flight deck centreline. The ship could normally carry about 36 aircraft.

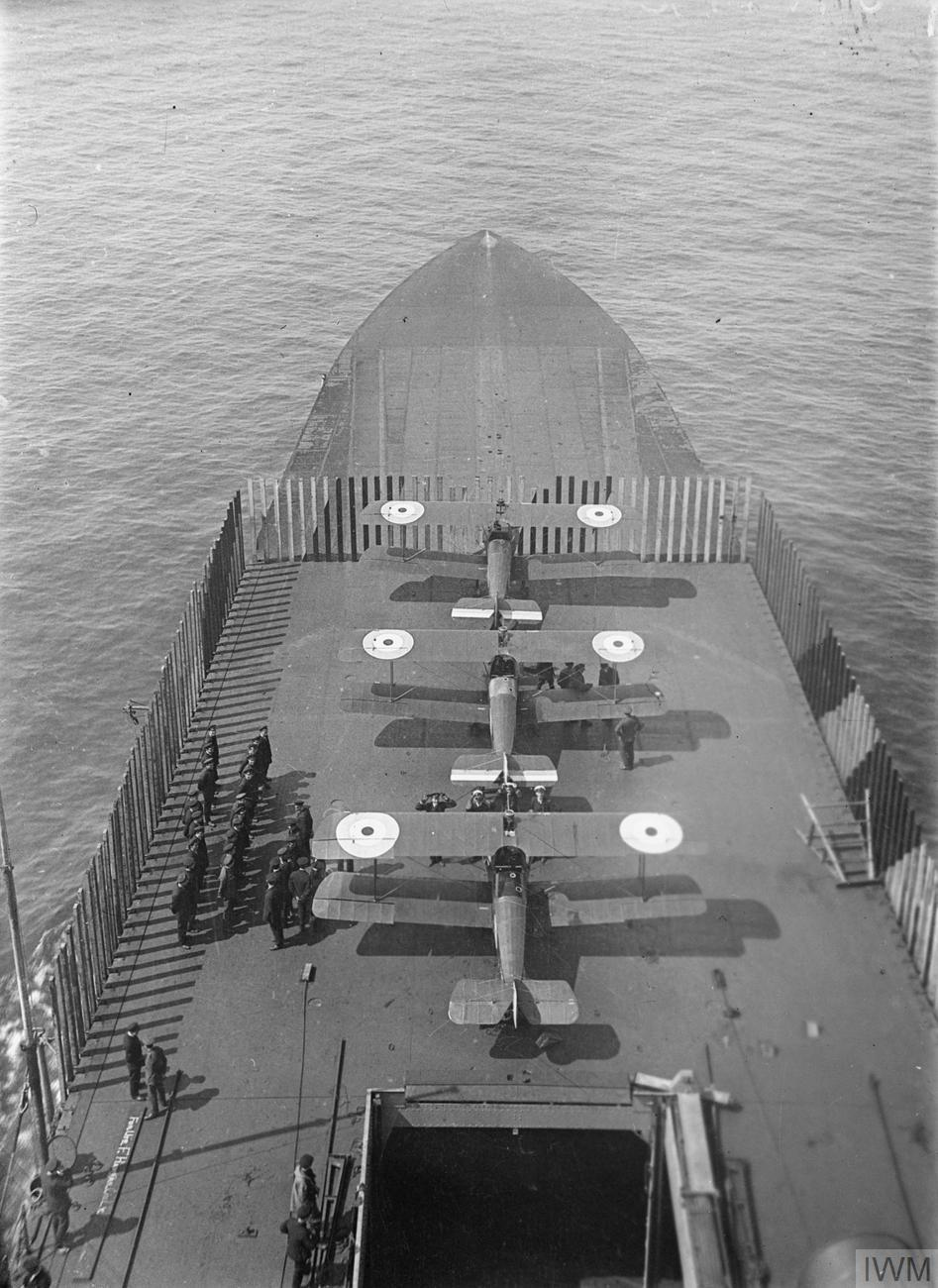
Sopwith Camels on Furious

Two 47-by-46-foot (14.3 by 14.0 m) lifts (elevators) were installed to transfer aircraft between the flight deck and hangars. No arresting gear was fitted and two 600-imperial-gallon (2,700 L; 720 US gal) ready-use petrol tanks were provided for aircraft and the ship's boats on the upper deck. An additional 20,000 imperial gallons (91,000 L; 24,000 US gal) of petrol were in bulk storage. In 1939, her complement consisted of 41 officers and 754 crewmen.

=== Armament ===
Furious retained ten of her original eleven breech-loading 5.5-inch (140 mm) guns, five on each side, for self-defence from enemy warships. Six QF 4-inch Mark V guns replaced her original anti-aircraft guns. Four were mounted on the sides of the flying-off deck and two on the quarterdeck. The four guns on the flying-off deck were removed in 1926–27 for trials of the lower flight deck, but only two were replaced when the trials were concluded. Four single QF 2-pounder "pom-poms" were installed in 1927. During Furious's September 1930 – February 1932 refit, her anti-aircraft outfit was reinforced by the addition of two eight-barrel QF 2-pounder Mark V pom-pom mounts where the forward 4-inch guns on the flying-off deck had been removed earlier.

The 5.5-inch and 4-inch guns were replaced during her refit in early 1939 by a dozen QF 4-inch Mk XVI guns in six twin dual-purpose Mark XIX mounts. One mount each was on the former flying-off deck and the quarterdeck while the other four were mounted two per side. Two more Mark V 2-pounder mounts were added fore and aft of the newly added island superstructure at the same time. While later refitting in the United States, the ship was fitted with a maximum of 22 manually operated automatic 20-millimetre (0.79 in) Oerlikon light anti-aircraft guns, which replaced the single quadruple Vickers .50 machine gun mount.

A single High Angle Control System director was fitted on the island and another on an elevated mount on the former flying-off deck. Two pom-pom directors were also mounted on the island for the weapons mounted fore and aft of the island.

== Inter-war service ==
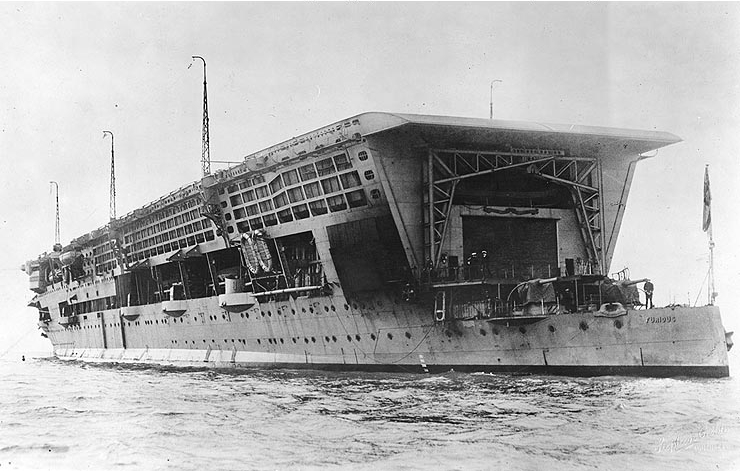
Stern view of Furious taken in 1925, shortly after her reconstruction

Furious was assigned to the Atlantic Fleet after commissioning in 1925, although she spent much of the next several years conducting trials for practically every aircraft in the Fleet Air Arm (FAA) inventory. These included landing and flying-off tests of Fairey IIID and Fairey Flycatcher floatplanes, with and without wheels, to compare various designs of wooden and metal floats. The lower flight deck was greased to allow them to take off with a minimum of difficulty. A Flycatcher fitted with wooden skids was also tested and behaved perfectly satisfactorily. The arresting gear was barely used during these trials and it was removed shortly afterwards. Deck-edge palisades were installed in 1927 to keep aircraft from blowing over the side in rough weather. The first carrier night-landing was made by a Blackburn Dart on 6 May 1926 aboard Furious. In the 1920s, the ship commonly carried one flight of fighters (Fairey Flycatcher), two of spotters (Blackburn Blackburn or Avro Bison), one spotter reconnaissance (Fairey IIID) and two flights of torpedo bombers (Blackburn Dart), each usually of six aircraft.

Furious was reduced to reserve on 1 July 1930 in preparation for a lengthy overhaul at Devonport. It lasted from September 1930 to February 1932 and was focused on refitting her machinery and re-tubing her boilers. In addition her quarterdeck was raised by one deck, the AA armament was revised and spraying facilities were fitted in the hangars. Upon completion, she ran a full-power trial on 16 February 1932 where her maximum speed was 28.8 knots (53.3 km/h; 33.1 mph) from a total of 89,745 shaft horsepower (66,923 kW).

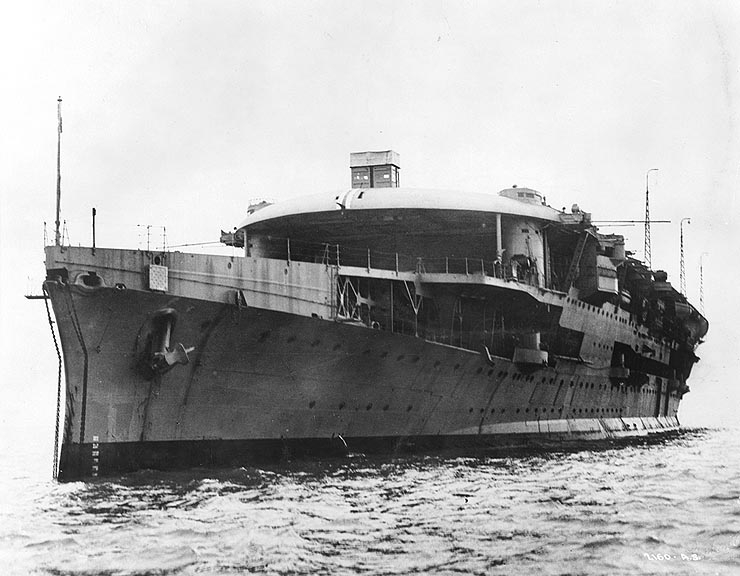
Oblique view of Furious at anchor before her armament was installed. Her retractable charthouse is prominent at the forward end of the flight deck.

Furious recommissioned in May 1932 as part of the Home Fleet with a reduced crew before being brought up to full complement in November. Transverse arresting gear was fitted sometime during the mid-1930s. She was detached to the Mediterranean Fleet from May to October 1934. Furious was present at the Coronation Fleet Review at Spithead on 20 May 1937 for George VI. She became a deck-landing training carrier in 1937, although she was refitted in Devonport between December 1937 and May 1938 where the forward end of her lower flight deck was raised to make her less wet forward. During the Munich Crisis in September 1938, the ship embarked 801, 821 and 822 Squadrons and joined the fleet at Scapa Flow, before resuming her training duties after the peaceful conclusion of the affair. She was struck a glancing blow by the destroyer Encounter during this time, but suffered only minor damage.

From 1933 to the end of 1938, Furious carried 801 Squadron which initially flew a mixture of six Hawker Nimrod and three Flycatcher fighters. Hawker Osprey fighters replaced the Flycatchers in early 1934 and the Nimrods were withdrawn in October 1936. 811 and 822 Squadrons were embarked for reconnaissance and anti-shipping missions. They flew the Blackburn Ripon, the Blackburn Baffin and the Fairey Swordfish torpedo bombers as well as the Fairey IIIF, the Fairey Seal and the Blackburn Shark reconnaissance aircraft.

The ship was given a more extensive refit from January to May 1939 that removed her 5.5-inch guns and palisades, mounted anti-aircraft guns on her lower flying-off deck, plated in the doors at the forward end of the upper hangar, and gave her a small island on the starboard side. Furious resumed her training duties after the completion of the refit and continued them until October 1939. As a deck-landing training carrier in 1939 Furious embarked 767 Squadron, flying Shark, Swordfish and Fairey Albacore torpedo bombers and reconnaissance aircraft, and 769 Squadron, flying Blackburn Skua, Blackburn Roc, and Gloster Sea Gladiator fighters.

== Second World War ==
Furious remained on training duties, combined with anti-submarine sweeps off the east coast of Scotland until 2 October 1939. She was then assigned to the Home Fleet to replace the sunken Courageous and embarked nine Swordfish aircraft from 816 Squadron and a detachment of three more Swordfish from 818 Squadron. The ship sortied on 8 October with the fleet to unsuccessfully hunt for the German battleship Gneisenau and escorting ships which had been spotted off southern Norway. After returning from this search, Furious departed her berth adjacent to the battleship Royal Oak in Scapa Flow for more futile searches for German ships on 13 October, the day before Royal Oak was sunk by U-47. Afterwards she was transferred to Halifax, Nova Scotia, where she and the battlecruiser Repulse formed a hunting group for German raiders. Furious served as the flagship for the convoy bringing most of the 1st Canadian Infantry Division to Britain in mid-December 1939. In the darkness on 17 December, the west-bound ocean liner RMS Samaria passed through the convoy unseen. She ripped off the horizontal wireless masts on Furious's starboard side, carried away five overhanging lifeboats from the port side of RMS Aquitania, and just missed the third and fourth ships in line.

=== Norwegian campaign ===
Furious joined the Home Fleet off the coast of Norway on 10 April 1940 with only eighteen Swordfish from 816 and 818 Squadrons embarked; no fighters were able to join the ship in time. Sixteen Swordfish made unsuccessful torpedo attacks on German ships in Trondheim harbour the following morning. On 12 April, both squadrons attempted to attack German ships in Narvik in bad weather. Disappointed with the failure of the torpedo attacks the previous day, bombs were carried instead. 818 Squadron, making the first attack, damaged several captured Norwegian ships, but lost two aircraft to flak, although the crews were rescued by the British cruiser Penelope and the destroyer Punjabi. Following 40 minutes behind, 816 Squadron was forced to turn back by heavy weather. One aircraft was lost while landing, but the crew was recovered. Another attack was launched the next day in support of the British ships entering Narvik, but they contributed little and another pair of Swordfish were shot down.

Furious, ordered to remain behind after the bulk of the Home Fleet departed on 15 April, departed the Narvik area on 14 April, escorted by three destroyers, to refuel at Tromsø. En route, her Swordfish attacked Junkers Ju 52 transports that had landed on frozen Lake Hartvikvatnet approximately 10 miles (16.1 km) northeast of Narvik. Two of the Ju 52s were destroyed and several others damaged. She reached the port on 16 April with only 27% of her fuel remaining. She stayed there until 18 April when she headed south to scout the Narvik area. She was attacked en route by a single Heinkel He 111 bomber of the II./KG 26 wing from very high altitude. Two large bombs narrowly missed the ship, the closest only 11 yards (10.1 m) off the port side aft. The shock shook her propeller shafts out of alignment and jarred the port inner high-pressure turbine so she was limited to 20 knots (37 km/h; 23 mph). Furious remained off the coast of Norway despite the damage and attempted to fly off aircraft on 22 April, despite severe weather, to discourage German aircraft from delivering supplies to the German forces in Narvik. One aircraft was shot down by the Germans and the others returned reporting heavy snowstorms between the ship and Narvik. The weather worsened the next day and Captain Troubridge decided to head to Harstad to check the damage from the near miss. It proved worse than anticipated and he was ordered back to the United Kingdom. Only six of the nine remaining Swordfish were serviceable.

After quick repairs, which included the removal of several rows of turbine blades, Furious returned to Norway on 18 May carrying the Gladiators of a reformed Royal Air Force 263 Squadron; they were flown off on 21 April once their base at Bardufoss was ready. One Gladiator and the guiding Swordfish crashed en route, killing all crewmen. The ship returned to Scapa Flow once all the Gladiators had been flown off, carrying only six Sea Gladiators of 804 Squadron and nine Swordfish of 816 Squadron for self-protection while ferrying 263 Squadron.

On 14 June, carrying only half of 816 Squadron for her own protection, Furious sailed unescorted for Halifax carrying £18,000,000 in gold bullion. On 1 July she escorted a convoy of Canadian troops bound for Iceland from Halifax and ferried over almost 50 aircraft with spare parts and munitions. On his own initiative, Captain Troubridge ordered all available space should be used to transport sugar to Britain. Upon her arrival, she embarked the rest of 816 Squadron, as well as nine Skuas of 801 Squadron and nine Swordfish of 825, and made a number of largely unsuccessful air strikes on shipping in Norwegian waters and on the seaplane base at Tromsø in September and October 1940, at a cost of several aircraft. Both Swordfish squadrons disembarked afterwards to make room as she prepared to resume her role as an aircraft transport.

=== Ferry duties ===
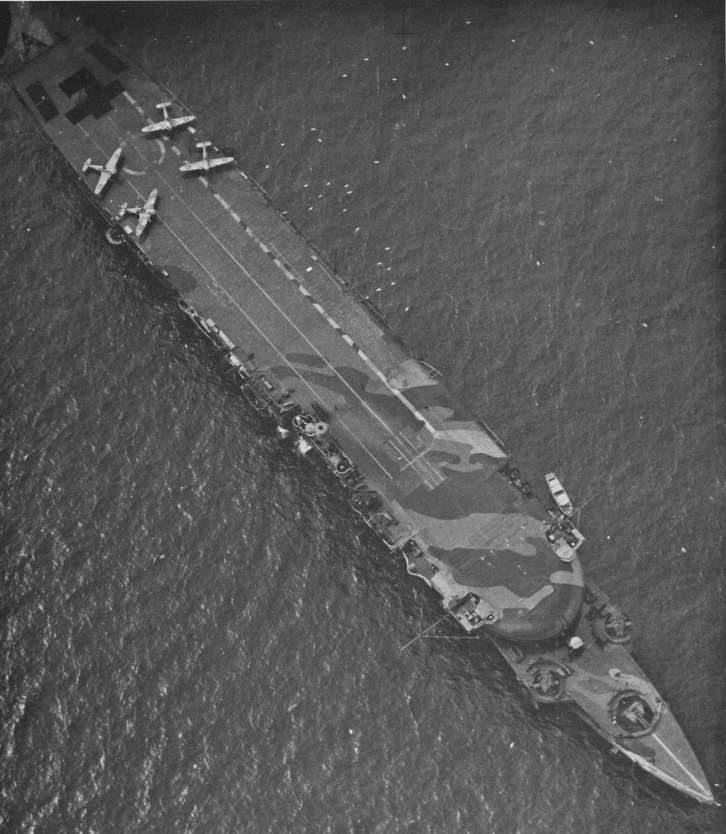
Furious in August 1941 with four Hurricanes on her flight deck

Furious loaded 55 aircraft, mostly crated Hawker Hurricane fighters of No. 73 Squadron RAF, in Liverpool on 7 November 1940 sailing for Takoradi, Gold Coast, on 15 November 1940 where they were flown off or off-loaded on 27 November with the ultimate destination of Egypt. During this time, she retained only six Skuas of 801 Squadron for her own protection. Furious was back in Liverpool by 15 December where she embarked 40 more Hurricanes for Takoradi. She sailed on 21 December 1940 joining with Convoy WS5A and the small carrier Argus. The German cruiser Admiral Hipper encountered the convoy on 25 December 1940, but little damage was inflicted by Admiral Hipper before she was driven off by the escorts. No air strike could be flown against the German cruiser because the Swordfish were embarked in Argus with bombs that they could not carry and their torpedoes were aboard Furious. After Furious's Skuas had flown off to search for Hipper, space was made to land the Swordfish to load the torpedoes, but the Skuas could not locate Admiral Hipper because of the poor visibility. Furious reached Takoradi on 10 January 1941 arriving back in Britain on 5 February 1941 where she was given a brief refit. She made another ferry trip to Takoradi on 4 March, carrying 12 Fairey Fulmars of 807 Squadron and six Swordfish of 825 Squadron for self-defence.

Furious now had a new destination for her ferry trips and she transported 24 Hurricanes to Gibraltar on 25 April where they were transferred to Ark Royal to be flown off for Malta. She sailed for a brief refit at Belfast immediately afterwards. While in Belfast she was hit by one small bomb and near-missed by two others during a German air raid in early May, but was only lightly damaged. The ship loaded another batch of 40 Hurricane IIs, plus nine Fulmars from 'X' Flight of 800 Squadron in Liverpool, and arrived back in Gibraltar on 18 May. Some of these fighters were moved to Ark Royal via planks between the flight decks of the carriers berthed stern to stern. This time she accompanied Ark Royal and the two carriers flew off their fighters from a position south of Sardinia. Furious loaded 48 more Hurricane IIs and arrived back in Gibraltar on 1 June where some of the fighters were transferred to Ark Royal. The two carriers departed Gibraltar on 4 June and flew off 44 of the 48 fighters. Furious returned to the Clyde for her biggest load of aircraft yet, 64 Hurricanes, leaving room for only nine Swordfish from 816 Squadron on this voyage. Upon her arrival on 25 June she transferred 22 Hurricanes to Ark Royal and that carrier flew them off to Malta the next day. Of the 42 Hurricanes left on Furious, 26 were moved to Ark Royal when she returned on 28 June. This time, however, both carriers sailed to deliver the fighters to their usual take-off point west of Sicily. The tenth of Furious's aircraft to take off crashed into her island, killing 14 men and starting a serious fire on the flight deck. The blocked flight deck forced the remaining six Hurricanes to remain on board and they were returned to Gibraltar. Furious exchanged 816 Squadron for 818 from Ark Royal, then departed for home.

In July, Furious embarked nine Fulmars of 800 Squadron, 'A' Flight of 880 Squadron with four Sea Hurricane IBs, nine Swordfish from 812 Squadron and nine Albacores of 817 Squadron to attack the German-occupied ports of Kirkenes, Norway, and Petsamo, Finland, departing Scapa Flow on the 23rd in company with the carrier Victorious, two cruisers and six destroyers. The two carriers and their escorts gathered in Seidisfjord, Iceland, under the command of Rear Admiral Wake-Walker where they refuelled in late July. Furious attacked ships in Petsamo on 30 July with all her Swordfish and Albacores, escorted by six Fulmars and all four Sea Hurricanes, but there was very little shipping present. One small ship, MV Trotter, was sunk, several oil storage tanks were set afire, and several wooden jetties were torpedoed. The British ships had been spotted before the attack and two Fulmars and an Albacore were shot down by the alerted defences. Furious was short of fuel and had to leave shortly afterwards, but she transferred her Albacores to Victorious to fill up that carrier's decimated squadrons before she left. Sea Hurricanes of 880 Squadron shot down a shadowing Dornier Do 18 flying boat on 31 July as the ship was leaving.

On 30 August, Furious left Belfast with a load of 49 Hurricanes, carrying three Fulmars of 800 Squadron and four Sea Hurricane IBs of 880A Squadron for self-defence, and nine Swordfish of 812 Squadron for Ark Royal. She arrived in Gibraltar on 6 September and transferred 40 Hurricanes to the other carrier the next day. Ark Royal sailed for the departure point the following day, but could only fly off 14 Hurricanes because some of the Bristol Blenheim bombers used to guide the fighters to Malta failed to make their rendezvous. When Ark Royal returned, she transferred the six Swordfish of 810 Squadron to Furious and both carriers departed that same day to deliver the Hurricanes. This was Furious's last ferry mission as she was sent to Philadelphia, Pennsylvania, for a lengthy refit. She arrived on 7 October and did not return to the United Kingdom until April 1942.

Furious spent the next three months after her return working up. In August, she was detailed to accompany the convoy bound for Malta in Operation Pedestal, but she was only to sail far enough with them to allow her 38 Supermarine Spitfires to reach Malta. This she did, just as Eagle was torpedoed, but Furious turned around after flying off her fighters and reached Gibraltar successfully. She loaded another batch of 32 Spitfires on 16 August and they were flown off the following day southeast of the Balearic Islands. After this mission, Furious was sent back to the Home Fleet for training. One last mission was necessary to reinforce the defences of Malta before Operation Torch and the ship arrived at Gibraltar on 27 October. She loaded 32 Spitfires and launched them on 29 August before returning to Gibraltar and being assigned to Force H.

As part of Operation Torch, Furious embarked 12 Supermarine Seafire IBs of 801 Squadron, another 12 Seafire IICs of 807 Squadron and nine Albacores of 822 Squadron to provide air cover for the amphibious landings by the Central Task Force. On the morning of 8 November, Furious's Seafires strafed the Vichy French airfield at Tafraoui, destroying three aircraft on the ground and shooting down one Dewoitine D.520 fighter, the first air-to-air kill by a Seafire. Eight Albacores, escorted by Sea Hurricanes from two escort carriers, attacked the field at La Senia. They were attacked by D.520s as they began their attack dive, but they destroyed 47 aircraft on the ground despite the loss of an Albacore from anti-aircraft fire and the loss of three and damage to two more against the French fighters. Seafires of 807 Squadron from Furious covered the landings at Oran, engaging a flight of D.520s, shooting down three and destroying about twenty aircraft on the ground.

=== Home waters ===
Furious remained with Force H until February 1943 before transferring to the Home Fleet where she remained for the rest of the war. In July, the fleet demonstrated off the coast of Norway in strength to distract attention from the Allied invasion of Sicily; Furious's role was to allow a German reconnaissance aircraft to spot the British ships and make a report, then shoot it down. She was refitted in August and spent the rest of the year training. During the passage of Convoy JW 57 from the UK to Russia in February 1944, Furious, escorted by the British battleship Anson and the French battleship Richelieu, attacked German shipping off the Norwegian coast on 24 February 1944. The carrier had the Seafire IBs of 801 Squadron aboard, plus the Fairey Barracuda torpedo bombers of 827 Squadron and 830 Squadrons. No aircraft were lost and a beached freighter was destroyed.

In preparation for Operation Tungsten, an attack on the Tirpitz, Furious and Victorious exchanged Barracuda squadrons, 827 for 831 Squadron, so that the squadrons that trained together could fly together. Furious also embarked 880 Squadron with eight Seafire L.IIC fighters to reinforce the six Seafire IBs of 801 Squadron. On the morning of 3 April 1944, 21 Barracudas of 827 and 830 Squadrons made the first attack just as the Tirpitz was getting under way for sea trials. The Germans were caught entirely by surprise and the Tirpitz's smokescreen was only just beginning to form. The British aircraft enjoyed a clear view of their target and hit the German battleship six times. An hour later, the second wave of 19 Barracudas from 829 and 831 Squadrons arrived and scored eight more hits. Only one Barracuda was shot down from each wave and another crashed on take-off. 801 and 880 Squadrons were retained for fleet air defence during the operation. Tirpitz's superstructure and upper hull was moderately damaged by the bombs, but her machinery was intact because the Barracuda pilots pressed home their attack below the 3,000-foot (910 m) altitude necessary to give their 1,600-pound (730 kg) armour-piercing bombs enough velocity to penetrate Tirpitz's main armoured deck. Nonetheless Tirpitz was under repair for three months.

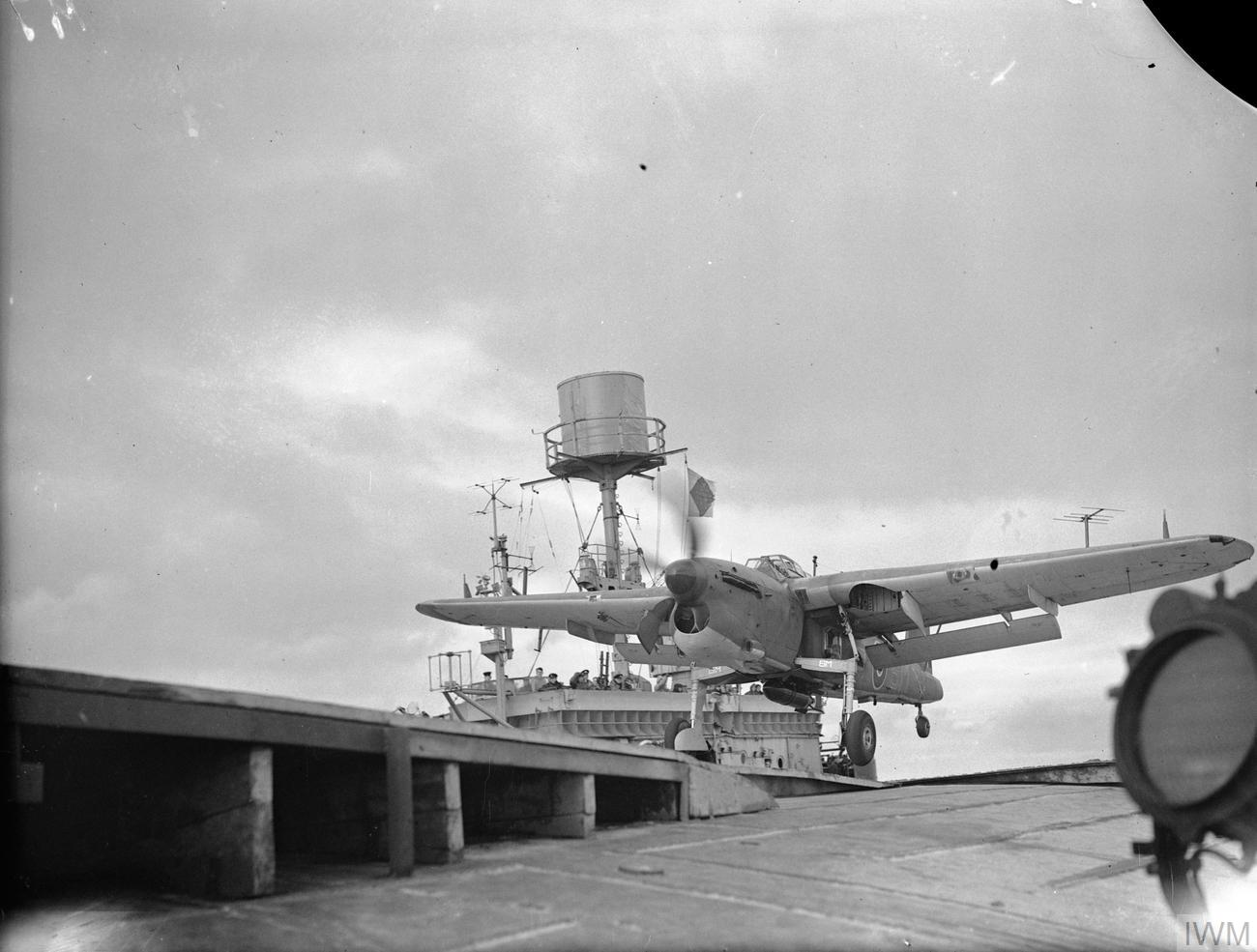
An 830 Naval Air Squadron Barracuda taking off from the temporary ski-jump on Furious at the start of Operation Mascot

The Home Fleet tried another attack on Tirpitz later on 23 April 1944, but bad weather prevented any attack from being made that day and for the next several days. Instead, the aircraft attempted to attack installations at Bodø on 26 April 1944, but found a German convoy instead and sank three ships. Furious and the escort carrier Searcher attacked shipping in the vicinity of Kristiansund and sank the ore carrier Almora and the tanker Saarburg for the loss of two aircraft on 6 May 1944. Another attack on Tirpitz by the Home Fleet had to be abandoned on 15 May 1944 because of poor weather. Yet another attempt on 28 May was foiled by bad weather, but a German convoy was successfully attacked on 1 June 1944. One ammunition ship was sunk and two others were set on fire.

Furious and the fleet carriers Formidable and Indefatigable made another attempt to sink the Tirpitz on 17 July 1944, in Operation Mascot. For this attack, the carrier embarked 880 Squadron with three Seafire L.IICs, 20 Grumman Hellcats of 1840 Squadron, Barracudas of 830 Squadron and three Swordfish of 842 Flight. The Barracudas, heavily loaded with bombs of up to 1,600-pound (730 kg), launched using a wooden ramp that was temporarily placed at the end of the flight deck, an early example of what was to be later named the ski-jump. The attack was unsuccessful against the fully alerted German defences as a smokescreen covered the German battleship so the Barracudas had to drop their bombs blindly through the smoke. Four more attacks on Tirpitz were made in August 1944 under the name of Operation Goodwood in a concerted effort to sink her. Furious carried twelve Seafire F.IIIs of 801 Squadron, another twelve Seafire L.IICs of 880 Squadron and nine Barracudas of 827 Squadron for this operation. The first attack on 20 August 1944 was recalled because of bad weather, but the attack on 22 August 1944 was spotted by the Germans and 11 aircraft were lost. Another attack was made two days later; one armour-piercing bomb penetrated Tirpitz's armoured deck but failed to detonate, and another 500-pound (230 kg) bomb did only superficial damage. A fourth attack was made on 29 August, but inflicted no damage.

By this time, the ship's age and limitations became increasingly apparent and she was placed in reserve on 15 September 1944. The ship was paid off in April 1945 being berthed at Loch Striven, was used to evaluate the effects of aircraft explosives on the ship's structure. Furious was sold in 1948 for scrap, and had been completely broken up in Troon by 1954.
