= Hawker Hedgehog =

Hedgehog

General information
- Type: Naval reconnaissance
- Manufacturer: Hawker Aircraft
- Status: Prototype
- Number built: 1

History
- First flight: 1924

The Hawker Hedgehog was a three-seat reconnaissance biplane, to be used for naval scouting, produced to meet Air Ministry Specification 37/22.

It was designed in 1923, and had its first flight the next year, piloted by F. P. Raynham. The crew consisted of the pilot, an observer and an air gunner. Its construction was typical of the period: a wooden structure covered with fabric. The powerplant was a nine-cylinder Bristol Jupiter IV radial engine driving a two-bladed wooden propeller.

While testing was successful, on completion of the flight tests, the project was cancelled. This was due to the Hedgehog's performance not being sufficiently better than the existing aircraft used for naval reconnaissance, the Avro Bison and Blackburn Blackburn. Consequently, only one prototype was built. The armament of the aircraft was one fixed forward-firing .303 in (7.7 mm) Vickers gun and one .303 in (7.7 mm) Lewis gun on a Scarff ring in the rear cockpit. The aircraft was fitted with floats that contained wheels to enable use as an amphibian. The wings could be folded, so that the width was reduced to 16 ft 7½ in (4.87 m) for storage.

== Specifications ==
Data from Hawker Aircraft since 1920

General characteristics

- Crew: three
- Length: 30 ft 8 3/4 in (9.37 m)
- Wingspan: 40 ft 0 1/2 in (12.20 m)
- Width: 16 ft 7 1/2 in (5.07 m) (wings folded)
- Height: 12 ft 6 in (3.81 m)
- Wing area: 480.7 sq ft (44.66 m^{2})
- Empty weight: 2,995 lb (1,359 kg)
- Gross weight: 4,791 lb (2,173 kg)
- Max takeoff weight: 4,800 lb (2,177 kg) (overload)
- Fuel capacity: 134 imp gal (161 US gal; 610 L)
- Powerplant: 1 × Bristol Jupiter IV 9-cylinder radial engine, 398 hp (297 kW)
- Propellers: 2-bladed wooden

Performance

- Maximum speed: 120.5 mph (193.9 km/h, 104.7 kn) at sea level
- Cruise speed: 89 mph (143 km/h, 77 kn)
- Stall speed: 45 mph (72 km/h, 39 kn) with flaps
- Endurance: 2.5 hr
- Service ceiling: 13,500 ft (4,100 m)
- Time to altitude: 23 min 59 s to 10,000 ft (3,000 m)

Armament

- Guns:
  - 1 × 0.303 in (7.7 mm) Vickers machine gun
  - 1 × 0.303 in Lewis gun on a Scarff ring
