= Westland Walrus =

Walrus
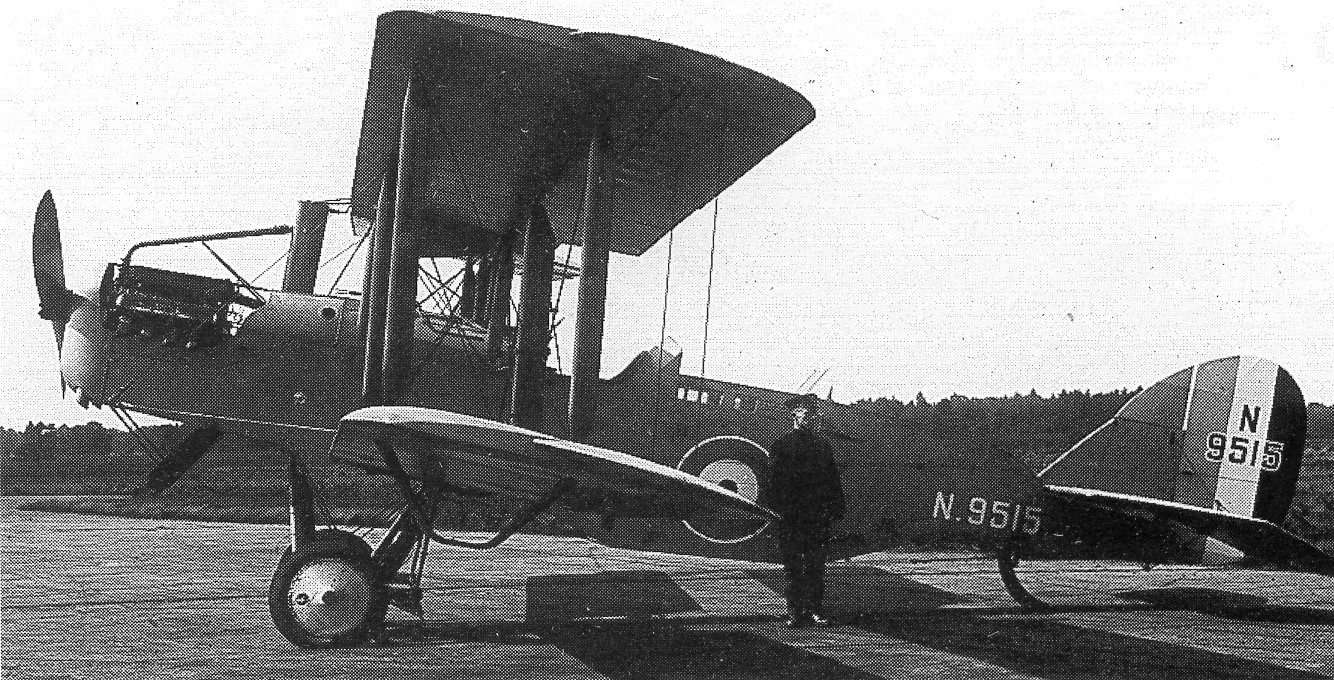

General information
- Type: Spotter
- National origin: United Kingdom
- Manufacturer: Westland Aircraft
- Primary user: Royal Air Force
- Number built: 36

History
- Introduction date: 1921
- First flight: 1921
- Retired: 1925
- Developed from: Airco DH.9A

The Westland Walrus was a British spotter/reconnaissance aircraft built by Westland Aircraft.

== Design and development ==
In 1919 the Royal Navy had an urgent need for a three-seat spotter/reconnaissance aircraft. To save money, the Airco DH.9A was adapted from part completed airframes, available in large numbers following the end of the First World War and the cancellation of orders. The initial attempt was carried out by Armstrong Whitworth Aircraft, adding provision for an observer and removing the stagger from the wings to produce the Armstrong Whitworth Tadpole.

Further development was passed on to Westland, who further modified the aircraft to produce the Walrus, with a 450 hp (336 kW) Napier Lion II engine replacing the Liberty engine of the DH.9A and Tadpole. Like the DH.9A, the Walrus was a single-engined, two-bay biplane. It was fitted with an extra cockpit for the observer/radio operator behind the gunner's cockpit, while the observer also had a prone position for observing in a ventral pannier. The undercarriage could be jettisoned and the aircraft was fitted with floatation bags and hydrovanes to aid safe ditching, together with arresting gear to aid landing on aircraft carriers. The wings were detachable to aid storage. The prototype first flew in early 1921, proving to have poor flying characteristics, being described by Westland's test pilot Stuart Keep as "a vicious beast" but despite this, a further 35 were ordered.

== Operational history ==
Production aircraft began to be delivered to No. 3 Squadron RAF at RAF Leuchars in 1921. No. 3 Squadron was split up to form independent Fleet Spotter Flights in 1923, although despite the extensive navalisation, the Walrus never operated from carriers. The Walrus continued in service in the Fleet spotting role until replaced by the Avro Bison and Blackburn Blackburn in late 1925.

== Operators ==
United Kingdom

- Royal Air Force
  - No. 3 Squadron RAF (Fleet Air Arm from 1924)

== Specifications ==
Data from Westland Aircraft since 1915

General characteristics

- Crew: 3
- Length: 29 ft 9 in (9.07 m)
- Wingspan: 46 ft 2 in (14.07 m)
- Height: 11 ft 7 in (3.53 m)
- Wing area: 496 sq ft (46.1 m^{2})
- Empty weight: 3,180 lb (1,442 kg)
- Gross weight: 4,998 lb (2,267 kg)
- Powerplant: 1 × Napier Lion II W-12 water-cooled piston engine, 450 hp (340 kW)
- Propellers: 2-bladed fixed-pitch propeller

Performance

- Maximum speed: 124 mph (200 km/h, 108 kn)
- Service ceiling: 19,000 ft (5,800 m)
- Rate of climb: 950 ft/min (4.8 m/s)
- Wing loading: 10.8 lb/sq ft (53 kg/m^{2})
- Power/mass: 0.09 hp/lb (0.15 kW/kg)

Armament

- Guns:

- 1 × forward firing Vickers machine gun
- 1 or 2 rear Lewis guns on Scarff ring

== See also ==
Related development

- Airco DH.9A

Related lists

- List of aircraft of the Fleet Air Arm
- List of aircraft of the Royal Air Force
