= Adrienne Bolland =

First woman to fly across the Andes

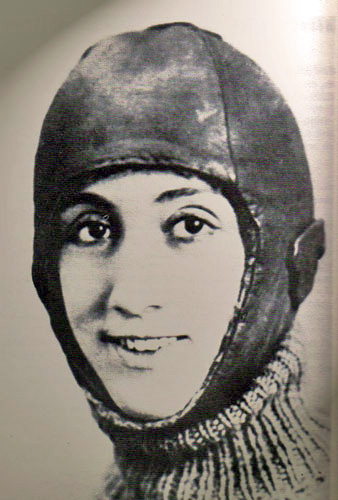
- Bolland ca. 1921
- Born: November 25, 1895; Arcueil, Île-de-France, France
- Died: March 18, 1975 (aged 79); Paris, France
- Known for: First flight over Andes by a woman
- Spouse: Ernest Vinchon
- Aviation career
- Famous flights: Across Andes, 1 April 1921
- Flight license: 1920; Le Crotoy

Adrienne Bolland, born Boland, (25 November 1895 – 18 March 1975) was a French test pilot. She was the first aviator to fly over the Andes between Chile and Argentina. She was later described as "France's most accomplished female aviator", setting a woman's record for loops done in an hour. The French government eventually recognized her with the Legion of Honor and other awards. Since her death, she has been commemorated with a postage stamp of Argentina.

Born into a large family outside Paris, she became a pilot in her twenties to pay off gambling debts. An early crossing of the English Channel led René Caudron, her employer, to send her to South America to demonstrate his planes, where she made her Andes crossing, assisted, she later said, by a tip relayed to her from a medium. Later in her life she became involved in leftist political causes, and eventually became part of the French Resistance during World War II.

== Early life ==
Bolland was born in 1895 in Arcueil, outside Paris, the youngest of seven, to Belgian émigrés. She developed an independent, assertive personality in her childhood, as it was difficult to get her father's attention. In the house she was known as "the little terror."

"No one could change my mind. I kept saying, 'I won't give up," she recalled later. "It served me well in life; I never gave in." As she grew into adulthood, that drive found its outlet in partying and gambling. During a drinking session after losing all her money at the race track, she expressed the desire to be a pilot. A friend present suggested she go work for Caudron, France's first airplane manufacturer. She could learn to fly and get paid, taking care of her financial problems.

== Aviation career ==
Bolland went to Caudron's headquarters at Le Crotoy, on the English Channel in northern France, and enrolled in flying lessons. A typographical error added the second "l" to her name, which she kept for the rest of her life. She earned her pilot's license in two months. While her instructors saw great potential as a pilot, on the ground she continued to be difficult to get along with, sometimes physically attacking those she disagreed with. She was often grounded for disciplinary reasons. "I became a different person in an airplane. I felt small, humble," she said later. "Because on the ground, the truth is, I was totally insufferable."

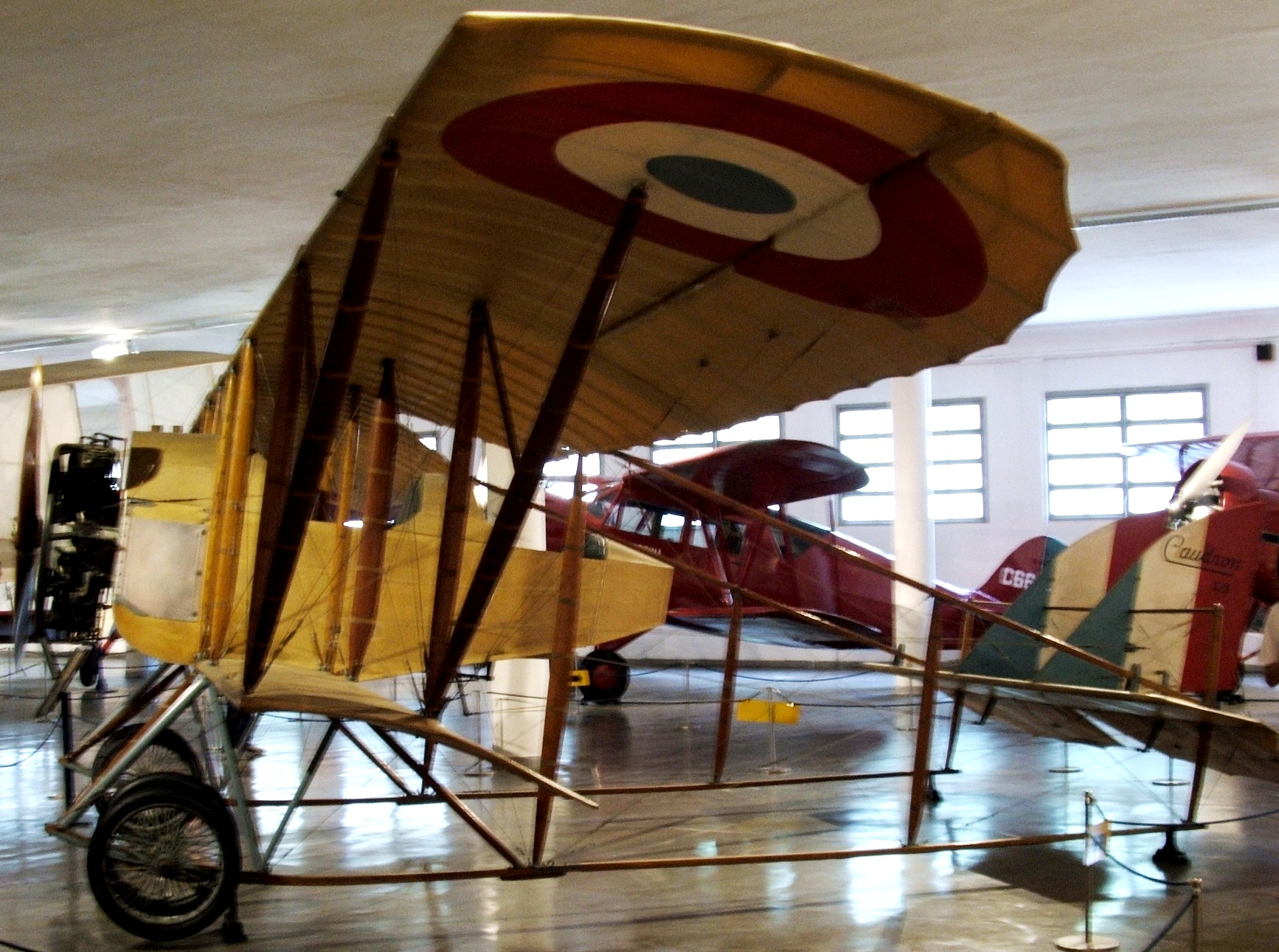
A G.3 on display in a Brazilian museum

After earning her license, she went to work for René Caudron doing what the other pilots did, mostly delivering and picking up planes. But she wanted to fly her own plane for him, and told him so. He reportedly pointed to one of his G.3s and said that if she could perform a loop, it was hers to fly for him. When she did, Caudron realized that having an attractive young woman flying his planes would be an excellent way to demonstrate how easy they were to fly. He told her to fly it over the English Channel. On the way there, she went to Brussels to spend the night celebrating with her friends. The next morning, newspapers reported that she was feared lost at sea. "I may have drowned last night," she quipped in response, "but not in water." The next day, 25 August 1920, she flew across the Channel, repeating Harriet Quimby's 1912 feat.

Caudron then asked her to go to Argentina to do demonstration flights. After she arrived, Bolland began planning her Andes flight. The G3s that had been sent along to Argentina with her had been designed for use as military observation aircraft during World War I. Fragile and powered by Le Rhône 80 hp engines, they were not ideal for the trip, and she asked Caudron to send others. He said it was impossible. When she finally took off from Mendoza on 1 April 1921, she had 40 hours of flight time and neither maps nor any knowledge of the area.

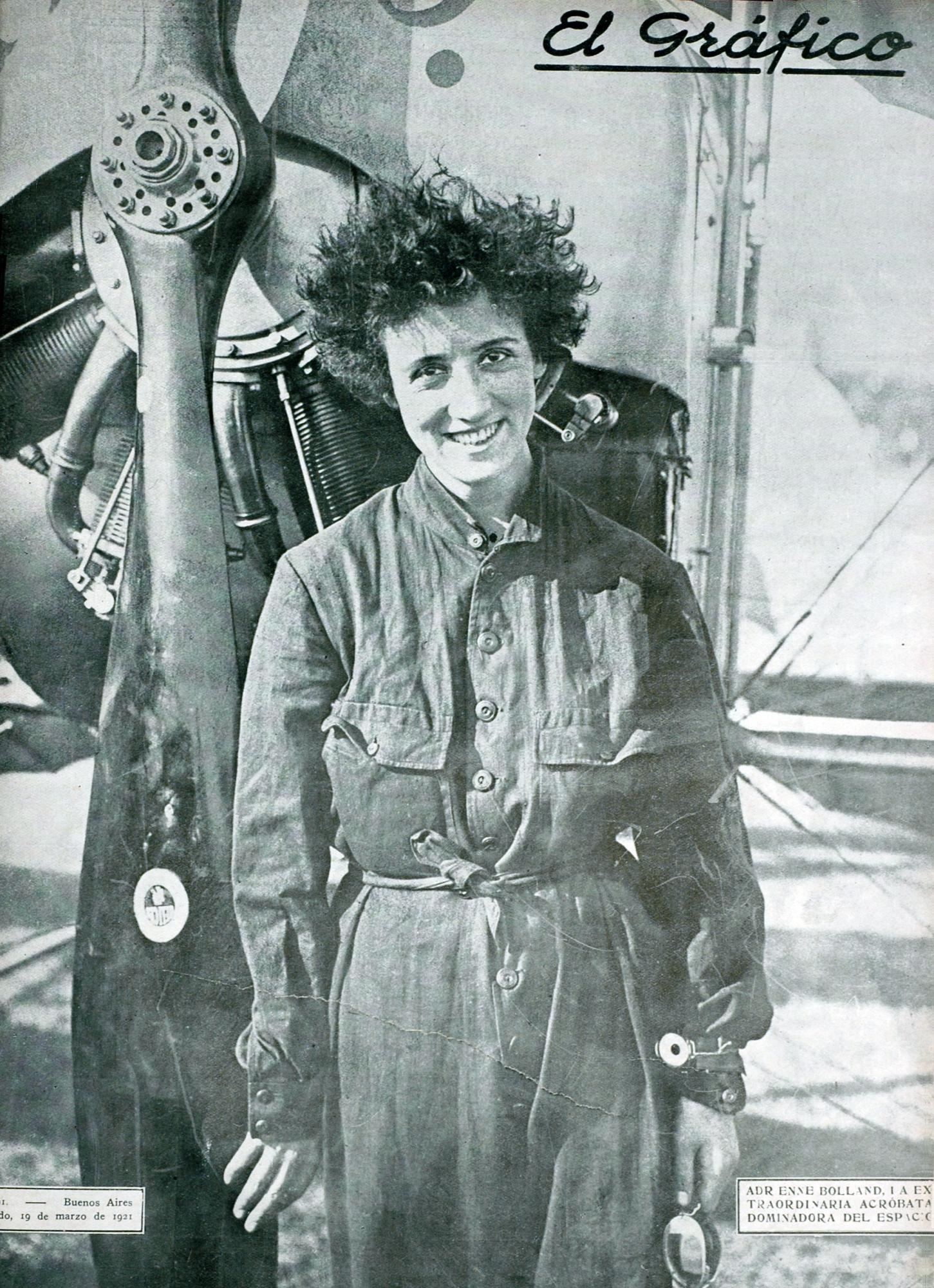
Adrienne Bolland - El Gráfico 91

The night before, Bolland said later, a Brazilian woman claiming to be a worker of French descent who had never even seen an airplane before had visited her in her Buenos Aires hotel room. She thought the shy woman was trying to discourage her and told her she had as long as it would take to smoke a cigarette for the Brazilian woman to say what she had to say. The woman told her that on her flight, when she saw an oyster-shaped lake, to turn left towards a steep mountain face that resembled an overturned chair. "If you turn right, you're lost."

Pilots had been attempting to cross the Andes since 1913, and the National Congress of Chile had offered a prize of 50,000 pesos for the first successful crossing of the range by a Chilean (if no foreigner had done so first) between the 31st and 35th parallels, where the highest peaks lay. Chilean Army officer Dagoberto Godoy claimed the prize in 1918.

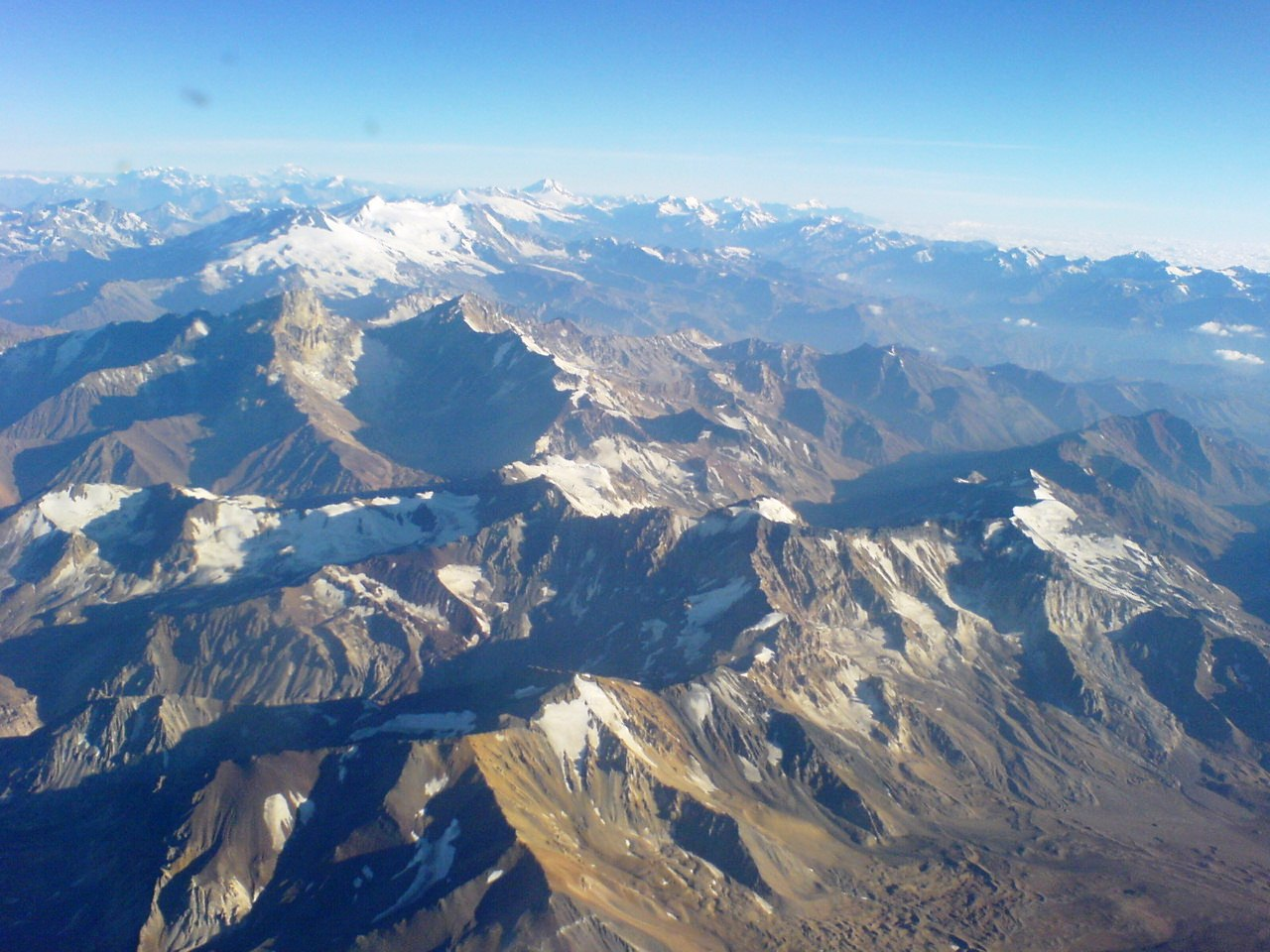
Andes in the area of Bolland's flight, seen from a commercial airplane in 2008

Bolland's flight was especially challenging. The G.3 could not fly much higher than 4,500 metres (14,800 ft), well below the range's summits, which reach up to 6,959 metres (22,831 ft) at Aconcagua, South America's highest peak. So, she had to fly between and around them and through valleys, a riskier route than Godoy and her predecessors had chosen. The flight suit and pajamas she wore under her leather jacket were stuffed with newspapers, which proved incapable of keeping her warm. The plane had no windshield, and the blood vessels in her lips and nose burst from the cold air at that altitude during the four-hour flight.

Seeing the oyster-shaped lake she had been warned about, with a valley leading to the right she did as she had been advised and turned toward the mountain face. "I had to choose; I don't know why I trusted the girl from Buenos Aires," she said many years later. "I turned left, thinking to myself: to think I'll crash for such a stupid reason." But the wind lifted her up just before she struck the mountain, and a break in the mountains soon appeared, beyond which were the plains of Chile. Later she learned the young woman had been sent to her by a medium. "Make whatever you will of it. I still don't believe in the occult sciences. But you have to admit that it takes some effort to not believe!"

She landed in Santiago, the capital. Many people had gathered to celebrate the feat. The French consul, who had believed it was an April Fool's Day joke, was not among them. She was called "the goddess of the Andes" by the celebrants, but dismissed the acclaim. "I said to myself: this is glory? It's nothing. Glory isn't worth anything compared to the inner joy of accomplishing something."

Bolland's accomplishment went largely unnoticed in her homeland at the time. Two years later, René Caudron's new wife got jealous of her and pressured her husband into firing her. In 1924, she was created a Knight of the Legion of Honor in belated recognition of her Andes flight. She continued to fly, setting a women's record of 212 loops tying with ten other pilots, all men, in an 18-flight, 2,100-kilometre (1,300 mi) race around France the next year.

In 1930, she was taking another woman on her first flight near Le Bourget when the engine failed. As she was attempting to land, the plane hit some telegraph wires, knocking it off course. Bolland was able to land the plane on the roof of a nearby shed and restrain her panicked passenger. Both women escaped unharmed; the plane was damaged beyond repair.

== Later life ==
In 1930 she married another aviator, Ernest Vinchon. Her combative nature continued to polarize those who knew her; a 1933 accident she survived was later ruled to have been the result of sabotage.

She and her husband became active in leftist political causes throughout the decade. They supported suffragist Louise Weiss, and later the Republicans during the Spanish Civil War. During World War II they remained in France and were part of the resistance.

She remained humble about her Andes flight. On its 50th anniversary, in 1971, she told a journalist who asked about it that "[u]ltimately, it doesn't interest me. I'm much more interested in what's happening now than 50 years ago." She died in Paris in 1975.

== Legacy ==
In addition to the awards she received throughout her lifetime, she has been recognized more recently. A street and lycée have been named for her in Poissy, a Paris suburb.

In 2005 La Poste, the French postal service, issued a stamp honouring her.

The Paris Tramway T3, which came into operation on 15 December 2012, has nine of the 26 stops named after notable women; the Adrienne Bolland stop is on boulevard Mortier in the 20th arrondissement.

A stamp celebrating the centenary of Bolland's flight crossing the Andes was issued in Argentina in 2021.

== Bibliography ==
- Béry, Coline (January 29, 2016). True Birds, looking for Adrienne Bolland's two legendary planes. Collection Corde Raide. ASIN B01B9IQBW2.
- Vandamme, Anne (November 2003). "Adrienne Bolland: La sauterelle des Andes" [Adrienne Bolland: Grasshopper of the Andes]. Le Fana de l'Aviation (in French) (408): 48–53. ISSN 0757-4169.

== See also ==
- List of firsts in aviation
- Women in aviation
