= Laura Bromwell =

American aviator (1897–1921)

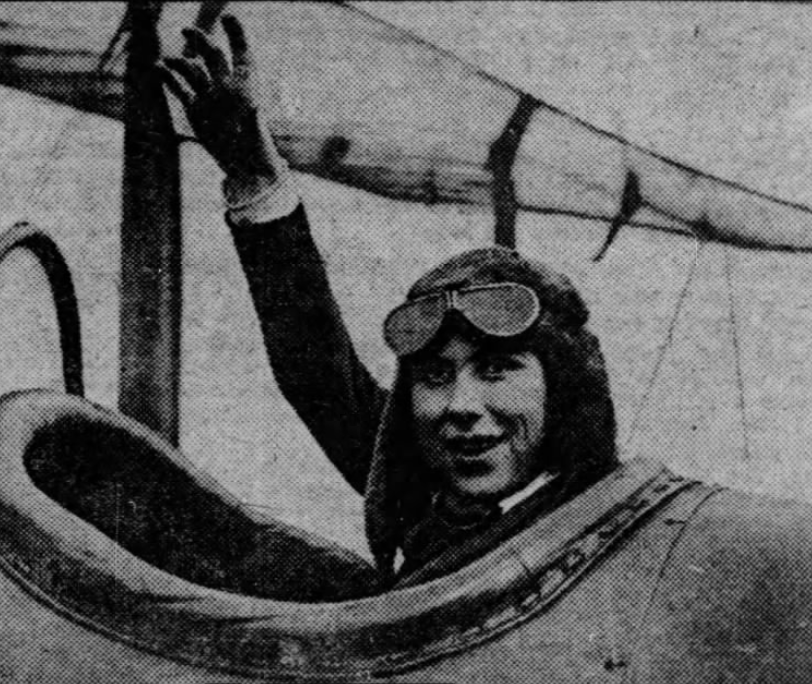
- Born: May 17, 1897; Cincinnati, Ohio, U.S.
- Died: June 5, 1921 (aged 24); Mineola, Long Island, New York, U.S.
- Cause of death: Plane crash
- Occupation: Aviator
- Years active: 1919–1921

Laura Bromwell (May 17, 1897 – June 5, 1921) was an early 20th-century American aviator. She held the loop the loop record and a speed record. She was killed in an aviation accident in 1921.

== Biography ==
Bromwell was born on May 17, 1897, in Cincinnati, Ohio.

Bromwell received her pilot's license in 1919. She was the first female member of the New York Aerial Police Reserve.

Bromwell set a loop the loop record of 87 loops in 1 hour and 15 minutes on August 20, 1920. She extended this to 199 loops in 1 hour and 20 minutes on May 15, 1921. She also set a speed record of 135 miles per hour (217 km/h) over a 2-mile (3.2 km) course.

== Death ==
On June 5, 1921, Bromwell was performing stunts in a borrowed Curtiss JN Canuck airplane at Mitchel Field in Mineola, Long Island, when the plane stalled. Bromwell was unfamiliar with the aircraft and its controls. It is thought that when the plane was inverted she lost contact with the foot pedals for a long enough period to lose control. The plane crashed to the ground, killing her.
