= Avro Bison =

Bison
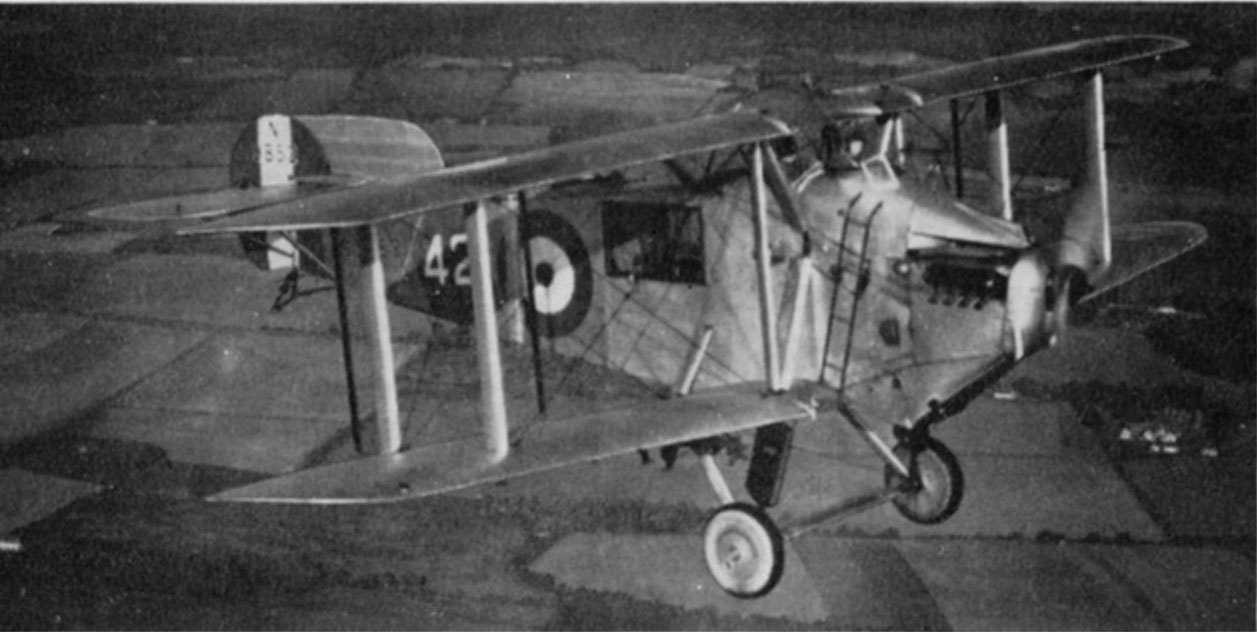
- Avro Bison II

General information
- Type: Fleet spotter/reconnaissance
- Manufacturer: Avro
- Status: Retired
- Primary user: Royal Air Force
- Number built: 55

History
- Introduction date: 1922
- First flight: 1921
- Retired: 1929

The Avro 555 Bison was a British single-engined fleet spotter/reconnaissance aircraft built by Avro.

== Development and design ==
The Bison was designed to meet British Specification 3/21 for a carrier-based fleet spotter and reconnaissance aircraft. An order for three prototypes was placed in October 1921, along with three of the competing designs from Blackburn Aircraft, the Blackburn Blackburn. Avro's design, the Type 555 Bison, was a two-bay biplane, powered, like the Blackburn, by a Napier Lion engine. The deep slab-sided fuselage was constructed from steel tubing, with the pilot sitting in an open cockpit forward of the wings, and the engine cowling sloping steeply down ahead of the pilot. An enclosed cabin with large rectangular windows on each side housed the navigator and radio operator and all their equipment, with sufficient headroom to stand upright, while a cockpit for a gunner armed with a Lewis gun on a Scarff ring was provided in the rear fuselage. The upper wings were mounted directly on the top of the fuselage.

The first prototype flew in 1921, with an order for 12 Bison Is following. The aircraft had handling problems, however, caused by interference of the pilots cockpit with the airflow over the upper wing. This was resolved by revising the wing design of the second prototype, raising the centre section of the upper wing by 2 ft (0.6 m) and removing dihedral from the upper wings, flying in this form in April 1923. Further production orders followed with these modifications incorporated as the Bison II, while some Bison Is were modified to a similar standard, sometimes known as the Bison IA. A Bison I was fitted with floats and retractable wheels but tests proved the design was not suitable for seaborne use.

== Operational history ==
Although designed for a naval requirement the first deliveries were to the Royal Air Force in 1922 to replace the Westland Walrus for coastal reconnaissance work with No. 3 Squadron RAF. In April 1923, 3 Squadron was broken up to form a number of Fleet Spotter Flights of the Fleet Air Arm. Naval aircraft served on HMS Argus, HMS Eagle and Furious and onshore at Gosport, England and Hal Far, Malta. The aircraft were retired in 1929 when they were replaced by the Fairey IIIF.

== Operators ==
United Kingdom

- Royal Air Force
  - 421 Fleet Spotter Flight Fleet Air Arm
  - 423 Fleet Spotter Flight Fleet Air Arm

== Variants ==
Avro 555 Bison
Three prototypes to Air Ministry specification 3/21.
Avro 555 Bison I
Twelve Lion II powered production aircraft, survivors rebuilt as IAs
Avro 555 Bison IA
Bison Is modified with a biplane gap and additional dorsal fin.
Avro 555A Bison II
Improved variant with biplane gap modification, 23 built.
Avro 555B Bison I
One Bison I converted to an amphibian to meet Air Ministry Specification 8/23, not ordered into production.

== Specifications (Bison II) ==
Data from Avro Aircraft since 1908

General characteristics

- Crew: 4
- Length: 36 ft 0 in (10.97 m)
- Wingspan: 46 ft 0 in (14.02 m)
- Height: 14 ft 2 in (4.32 m)
- Wing area: 630 sq ft (59 m^{2})
- Empty weight: 4,116 lb (1,867 kg)
- Max takeoff weight: 6,132 lb (2,781 kg)
- Powerplant: 1 × Napier Lion II W-12 liquid-cooled piston engine, 480 hp (360 kW) at 2,200 rpm

normal 450 hp (336 kW) at 2,000 rpm

- Propellers: 2-bladed fixed-pitch propeller

Performance

- Maximum speed: 108 mph (174 km/h, 94 kn)
- Cruise speed: 90 mph (140 km/h, 78 kn)
- Range: 360 mi (580 km, 310 nmi)
- Service ceiling: 12,000 ft (3,700 m)
- Rate of climb: 450 ft/min (2.3 m/s)

Armament

- Guns: 1 × fixed forward firing .303 in Vickers machine gun and 1 × .303 in (7.7 mm) Lewis Gun on Scarff ring
- Bombs: Provision for underwing bomb racks

== See also ==
Aircraft of comparable role, configuration, and era

- Blackburn R.1 Blackburn

Related lists

- List of aircraft of the RAF
