= Blackburn Blackburn =

1922 reconnaissance aircraft family by Blackburn

R.1 Blackburn
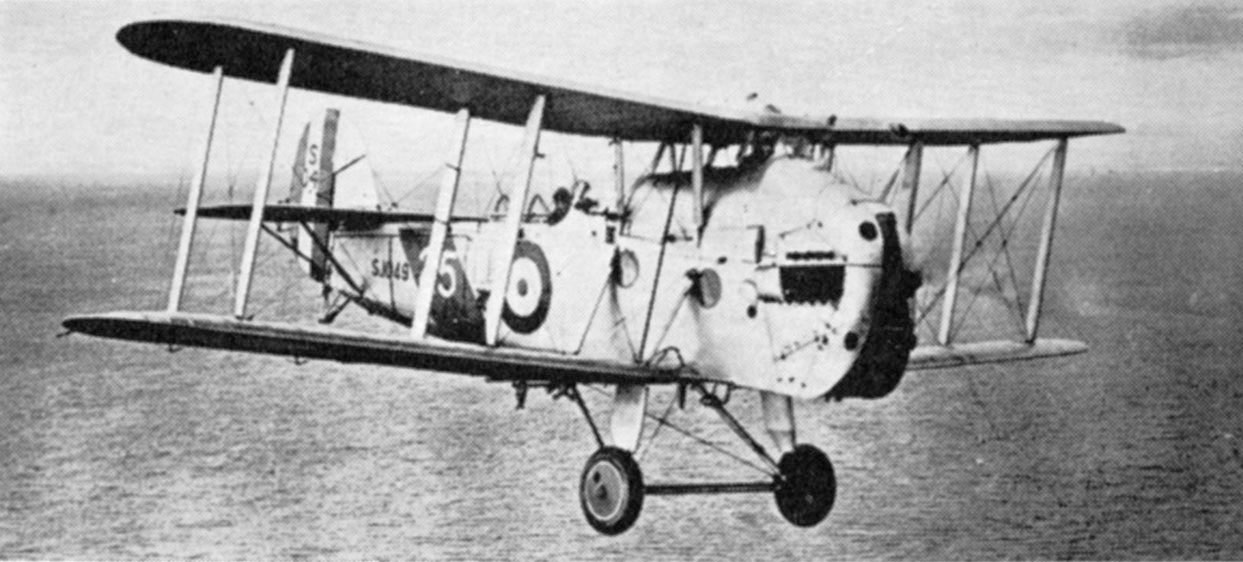
- Blackburn Blackburn II

General information
- Type: Carrier-based reconnaissance
- Manufacturer: Blackburn Aeroplane & Motor Company Limited
- Primary user: Fleet Air Arm
- Number built: 62

History
- Introduction date: 1923
- First flight: 1922
- Retired: 1931
- Developed from: Blackburn T.2 Dart

The Blackburn R-1 Blackburn was a 1920s British single-engine fleet spotter/reconnaissance aircraft built by Blackburn Aircraft.

== History ==
The Blackburn was developed to meet a naval requirement (Specification 3/21) for a carrier-based reconnaissance aircraft and gun spotting aircraft. Blackburn designed a new fuselage and used the wing and tail surfaces from the Blackburn Dart. The pilot sat in an open cockpit above the engine, a navigator sat inside the fuselage and a gun position was located at the rear of the fuselage cabin. The aircraft's two-bay wings could fold for stowage aboard aircraft carriers, with the upper wing attached directly to the fuselage, which filled the interplane gap. Armament was a single forward-firing Vickers machine gun mounted externally to the left of the pilot, with a Lewis gun on a Scarff ring for the gunner.

Three prototypes were flown during 1922, leading to an initial production contract for 12 aircraft. The production aircraft were designated Blackburn I and the first deliveries to the Fleet Air Arm at Gosport began in April 1923. 18 more Blackburn Is were built in 1923–1924. Its first operational deployment was with No. 422 Fleet Spotter Flight, which deployed aboard HMS Eagle in the Mediterranean in 1923.

A further order was placed for 29 Blackburns with the more powerful Napier Lion V engine, designated the Blackburn II. The upper wing was raised 22 1/2 inches (0.57 m) to improve handling. A few Blackburns were used as dual-control trainers and all the Blackburn Is were converted to II standard before the type became obsolete in 1931, when they were replaced by the Fairey IIIF.

== Variants ==
Blackburn
Prototype, three built.
Blackburn I
Production version with a 449 hp (335 kW) Napier Lion IIB engines, 33 built.
Blackburn II
Improved production version with a 464 hp (346 kW) Napier Lion V, and increased gap between wings. 29 built.

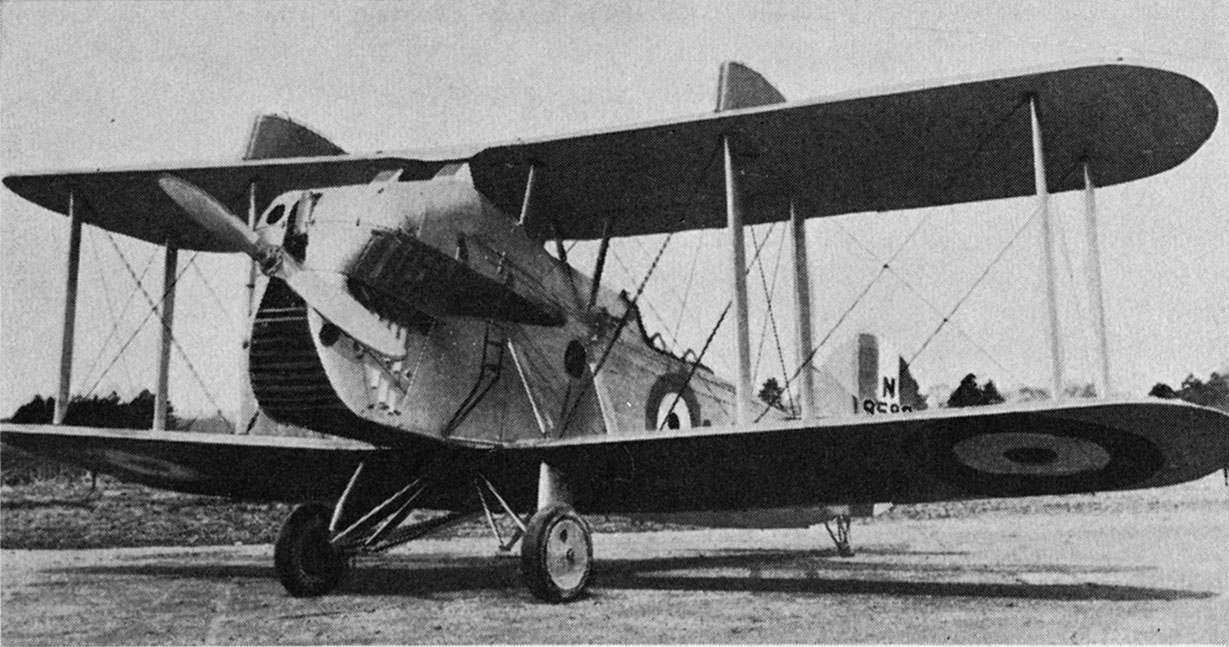
Blackburn Blackburn Trainer

Blackburn Trainer
Trainer version of Blackburn I, fitted with side-by-side cockpit and dual controls. Known by the Fleet Air Arm as the Bull. Two out of Blackburn I batch.

== Operators ==
United Kingdom

- Royal Air Force
  - No. 422 (Fleet Spotter) Flight RAF – 1923–1928
- Royal Navy
  - Fleet Air Arm
    - No. 420 (Fleet Spotter) Flight RAF – 1926–1928
    - No. 449 (Fleet Spotter Reconnaissance) Flight FAA – 1929–1931
    - No. 450 (Fleet Spotter Reconnaissance) Flight FAA – 1929–1931

== Specifications (Blackburn I) ==
Data from British Naval Aircraft since 1912

General characteristics

- Crew: 3
- Length: 36 ft 2 in (11.02 m)
- Wingspan: 45 ft 6 in (13.87 m)
- Height: 12 ft 6 in (3.81 m)
- Wing area: 650 sq ft (60 m^{2})
- Empty weight: 3,929 lb (1,782 kg)
- Gross weight: 5,962 lb (2,704 kg)
- Max takeoff weight: 6,648 lb (3,015 kg)
- Powerplant: 1 × Napier Lion IIB W-12 water-cooled piston engine, 450 hp (340 kW)

Performance

- Maximum speed: 122 mph (196 km/h, 106 kn) at 3,000 ft (914 m)
- Endurance: 4 hours 15 minutes
- Service ceiling: 12,950 ft (3,950 m)
- Rate of climb: 690 ft/min (3.5 m/s)

Armament

- Guns: 2 × .303 in (7.7 mm) Lewis guns

== See also ==
Aircraft of comparable role, configuration, and era

- Avro Bison

Related lists

- List of aircraft of the Royal Air Force

== Bibliography ==
- Jackson, A. J. (1968). Blackburn Aircraft since 1909. London: Putnam. ISBN 0-370-00053-6.
- Thetford, Owen (1978). Aircraft of the Royal Navy since 1912 (4th ed.). London: Putnam. ISBN 0-370-30021-1.
- The Illustrated Encyclopedia of Aircraft (part work 1982–1985). London: Orbis. OCLC 16544050.
