= RNAS Dundee =

Former Royal Naval Air Station in Angus, Scotland

RNAS Dundee HMS Condor II
- Dundee, Angus in Scotland
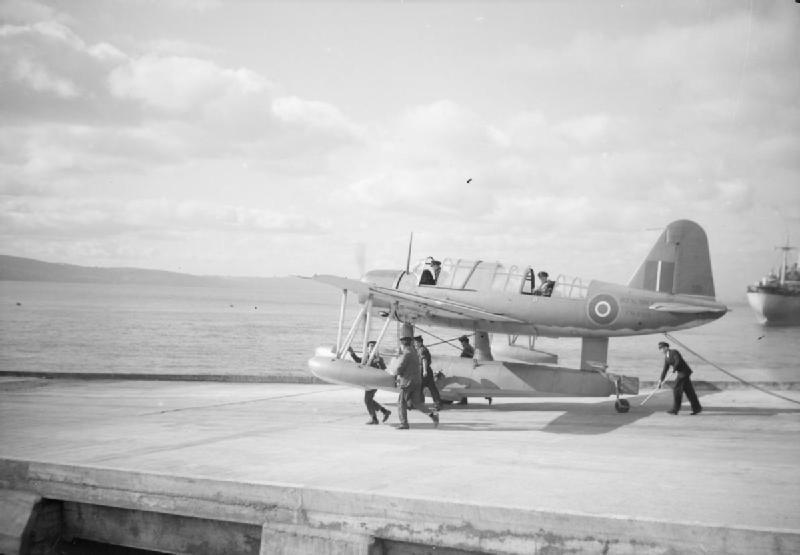
- Kingfisher I departs on patrol from the slipway leading to the River Tay at HMS Condor II

Site information
- Type: Royal Naval Air Station
- Owner: Admiralty
- Operator: Royal Navy
- Controlled by: Fleet Air Arm
- Condition: Disused

Location
- Shown within Angus RNAS Dundee (the United Kingdom)
- Coordinates: 56°27′52″N 002°55′24″W
- Grid reference: NO433307

Site history
- Built: 1914
- In use: 1940 - 1944
- Fate: Industry
- Battles/wars: European theatre of World War II

Garrison information
- Garrison: Seaplane school for Observer training

Royal Naval Air Station Dundee, more commonly known as RNAS Dundee; (commissioned HMS Condor II), is a former Royal Navy, Naval Air Station, situated 1 mile (2 km) east of Dundee docks and 2.5 miles (4 km) north east of the Tay Bridge, Dundee, Scotland. It was a seaplane base from the First World War and was maintained on a care and maintenance basis until it was reactivated at the onset of the Second World War.

It had two slipways: one was a 60 feet (18 m) aircraft slipway that extended directly from the hangar apron, while the other was a 40 foot (12 m) boat slipway that led directly to the boatshed.

== History ==
Royal Naval Air Station Dundee was a Royal Navy Fleet Air Arm seaplane base located at the harbour of Dundee. The station was active during both World War I, then known as Stannergate and later during the World War II, when it functioned as a satellite station to Royal Naval Air Station Arbroath, also known as HMS Condor.

=== First World War operations ===
Naval aviation activity at Dundee began shortly before the outbreak of the First World War and expanded as the conflict progressed. The base gained greater organisational structure in 1918 when several flights were formed together as components of 249 Squadron and 257 Squadron.

Aircraft operating from Dundee during this period included the Felixstowe F.2A flying boat and the Short Type 184 seaplane. These aircraft conducted maritime patrols over nearby coastal waters. Both units were disbanded during the second half of 1919 as wartime aviation activities were reduced.

=== Interwar closure and reopening ===
The air station closed in 1920 but was reactivated in July 1940 during the Second World War. Upon reopening, the base was commissioned as HMS Condor II and operated as a satellite air station for HMS Condor at Arbroath.

=== Second World War operations ===
In August 1941, 751 Naval Air Squadron relocated to Dundee from the parent station at Arbroath. The squadron conducted training for observer crews, including catapult-launch procedures using the Supermarine Walrus amphibious aircraft. This training role continued until the squadron was disbanded in May 1944.

During roughly the same period, floatplanes of 703 Naval Air Squadron were also based at Dundee. The unit operated the Vought OS2U Kingfisher, which was used primarily for reconnaissance and training duties.

=== Closure and legacy ===
The station was 'paid off' and closed in June 1944.

Following the end of military operations, the site gradually disappeared as it was absorbed into Dundee’s expanding harbour area. One of the station’s hangars survived until the mid-1980s before being demolished during redevelopment of the waterfront.

=== Units ===
The following units were here at some point:

- No. 249 Squadron RAF
- No. 257 Squadron RAF
- No 318 (Flying Boat) Flight
- No 319 (Flying Boat) Flight
- No 400 (Seaplane) Flight
- No 401 (Seaplane) Flight
- No 450 (Baby Seaplane) Flight
- 703 Naval Air Squadron
- 751 Naval Air Squadron
- ‘G’ Boat Seaplane Training Flight

== See also ==
- List of air stations of the Royal Navy
