= 703 Naval Air Squadron =

Inactive flying squadron of the Royal Navy's Fleet Air Arm

- Squadron badge
- Active: 1942–1944; 1945–1955; 1972–1980; 2003–2021
- Disbanded: 16 December 2021
- Country: United Kingdom
- Branch: Royal Navy
- Type: Fleet Air Arm Second Line Squadron
- Role: Catapult Squadron; Naval Air Sea Warfare Development Unit; Service Trials Unit; Wasp Training Unit; Elementary Flying Training
- Part of: Fleet Air Arm and No. 3 Flying Training School
- Home station: See Naval air stations section for full list.
- Mottos: Experientia docet (Latin for 'Experiences teaches')
- Aircraft: See Aircraft flown section for full list.

Insignia
- Squadron Badge Description: Blue, in chief a mailed hand white holding a balance gold over waves white and blue of four in base white (1946)
- Identification Markings: single letters (all types, April 1945); 031-099 (November 1948); 001-099 (April 1950); 283-288 (Firefly, February-July 1954); 500-507 (Wasp, 1972-80); 634-636 (also Wasp, 1975-80)
- Fin Shore Codes: LP (by November 1948); FD (April 1950)

703 Naval Air Squadron (703 NAS) is an inactive Fleet Air Arm (FAA) naval air squadron of the United Kingdom’s Royal Navy (RN). Since 2003, the squadron had formed the Royal Naval wing of the Defence Elementary Flying Training School / No. 3 Flying Training School, at RAF Barkston Heath.

It was initially formed as a long-range catapult squadron on 3 March 1942 at RNAS Lee-on-Solent (HMS Daedalus). During the Cold War, it was reformed as an experimental trials unit, and then as a helicopter training squadron.

== History ==
=== World War II ===
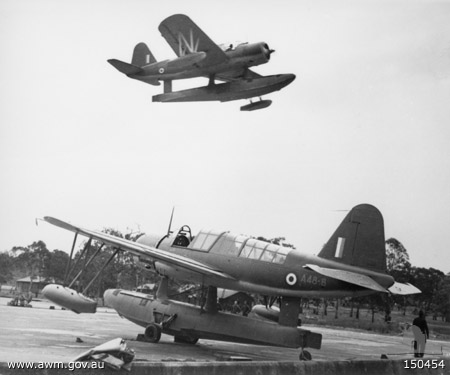
Two Royal Australian Air Force Vought Kingfisher aircraft in 1942

On 3 June 1942, 703 Naval Air Squadron was formed at RNAS Lee-on-Solent (HMS Daedalus), Hampshire, England, to operate floatplanes off catapult-equipped Armed Merchant Cruisers (AMC). It was initially equipped with Vought Kingfisher, an American observation floatplanes, supplementing these with Fairey Seafox, a British reconnaissance floatplane and Fairey Swordfish torpedo bomber floatplanes.

The squadron also operated three Supermarine Walrus, an amphibious maritime patrol aircraft, from Walvis Bay in southern Africa. On 1 May 1944, the squadron was disbanded.

==== Ships' Flights ====
The Ships’ Flights formed and then converted to Vought Kingfisher aircraft. Advanced training took place at RNAS Dundee (HMS Condor II), Scotland. Standard for each AMC was two aircraft, HMS Fidelity also had two, although the light Cruisers had only one. HMS Pretoria Castle’s Fairey Seafox Flight was taken over from 702 Naval Air Squadron, but didn’t convert to Vought Kingfisher. List of ships and dates for flights:

- HMS Emerald (1942-44)
- HMS Enterprise (1943-44 did not embark)
- HMS Canton (1943-44)
- HMS Cilicia (1942-43)
- HMS Corfu (1942-43)
- HMS Pretoria Castle (June 1942)
- HMS Ranpura (June-December 1942 did not embark)
- HMS Fidelity (June 1942, lost with ship 30 December 1942)

=== Air Sea Warfare Development Unit (1945–1950) ===
In April 1945, the squadron was reformed as the naval Flight of the Royal Air Force's Air Sea Warfare Development Unit (ASWDU) at RAF Thorney Island, West Sussex, to conduct experimental trials on a large variety of aircraft including Grumman Avenger, an American torpedo bomber, Fairey Barracuda, a British torpedo bomber, Fairey Firefly, a carrier-borne fighter aircraft and anti-submarine aircraft and de Havilland Sea Mosquito, a navalised version of the British twin-engined, multirole combat aircraft. The squadron moved to RNAS Lee-on-Solent (HMS Daedalus) in May 1948, absorbing 778 Naval Air Squadron and adding 778's Service Trials Unit role to its existing duties.

In 1948–49, the squadron tested plans to land jet aircraft on to a flexible deck, without the use of an undercarriage; trials were conducted by the squadron using a de Havilland Sea Vampire.

=== Service Trials Unit (1950–1955) ===
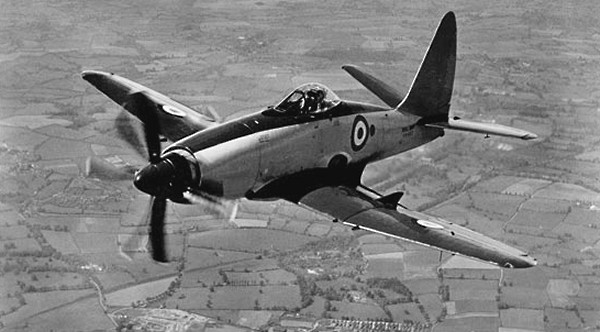
A Westland Wyvern aircraft of the Fleet Air Arm

On 19 April 1950, the squadron moved to RNAS Ford (HMS Peregrine), Sussex, (now the site of HM Prison Ford), concentrating on the Service Trials Unit role and became known as the STU. It was further strengthened on 12 July 1950, when 739 Naval Air Squadron, a unit specialising in development of photographic reconnaissance was merged with 703 Naval Air Squadron.

At RNAS Ford it experimented with British innovations in aircraft carrier operations, including the mirror landing aid and the steam catapult.

Independent flights were set up for a number of specialist trials. From February to June 1954, 703A Flight was based at RNAS Arbroath (HMS Condor), Angus, Scotland, for tests of a new controlled approach system for aircraft carriers, while 703X Flight carried out trials on the Fairey Gannet AS.1 anti-submarine warfare aircraft, from March to December 1954 and 703W Flight tested the Westland Wyvern, a British single-seat carrier-based multi-role strike aircraft.

In August 1955, 703 Naval Air Squadron and 771 Naval Air Squadron amalgamated to form 700 Naval Air Squadron.

==== Carrier Ships' trials ====
As well as the carrier flexible deck trials, deck landing aids, and also steam catapult trials, its aircraft became the first to operate from the new HMS Eagle. Its later duties included the testing of catapult and arrester gear after aircraft carrier refits:

- HMS Warrior (1948-49)
- HMS Indomitable (1950-52)
- HMS Illustrious (1951-52)
- HMS Theseus (January 1952)
- HMS Perseus (R51) (1952)
- HMS Vengeance (January 1953)
- HMS Eagle (January 1953)
- HMS Theseus (May 1953)
- HMS Indomitable (June 1953)
- USS Antietam (June-July 1953)
- HMS Illustrious (July 1953)
- HMCS Warrior (December 1953)
- HMS Eagle (January 1954)
- HMS Illustrious (January 1954)
- HMS Centaur (May 1954)
- HMS Centaur (August 1954)
- HMS Bulwark (February 1955)
- HMS Eagle (April 1955)
- HMS Ark Royal (June-July 1955)

=== Wasp Training Unit (1972–1981) ===
On 22 January 1972, 703 NAS was re-formed at RNAS Portland (HMS Osprey), Dorset, England, to conduct training on the Westland Wasp HAS.1, an anti-submarine warfare helicopter, taking over the duty from 829 Naval Air Squadrons training section and it became the Wasp Training Unit.

From February 1975 it added advanced training, a role it took over from 706 Naval Air Squadron. It became the sole unit for Westland Wasp training, including conversion and Advanced and Operational Flying Training, providing aircrew and ground crew training.

On 1 January 1981, after 9 years of training aircrew on the Wasp, the squadron was disbanded.

=== Elementary Flying Training (2003–2021) ===
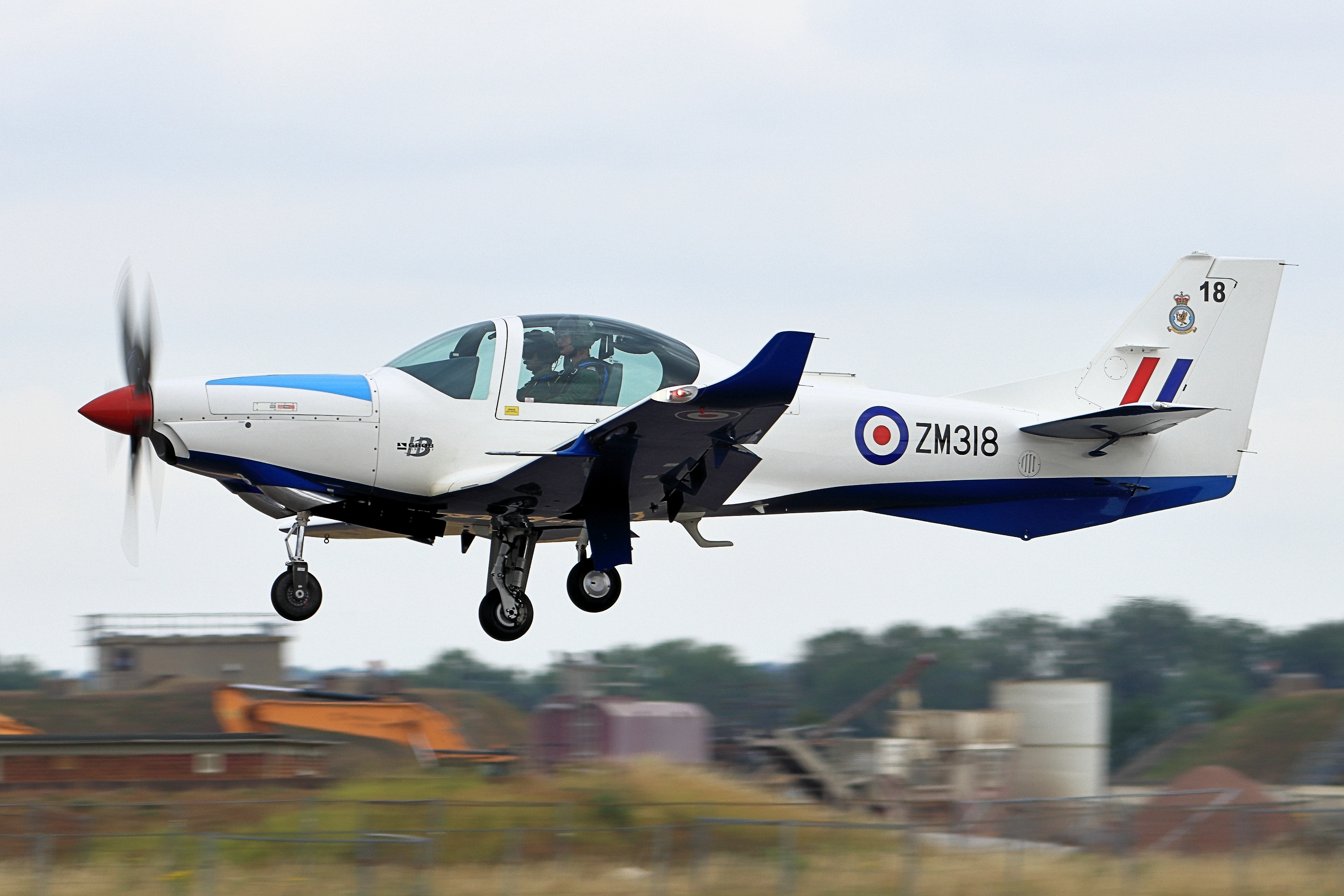
Grob Prefect of the Defence Elementary Flying Training School

From April 2003, 703 Naval Air Squadron was allocated to the Royal Navy section of No. 1 Elementary Flying Training School at RAF Barkston Heath, Lincolnshire, England.

The Royal Navy Elementary Flying Training School (RNEFTS) formed within No. 2 Flying Training School RAF at RAF Church Fenton, North Yorkshire, England, in January 1970, which operated with the Scottish Aviation Bulldog, a basic trainer aircraft, before moving to RAF Leeming, North Yorkshire, in November 1974. It remained there for ten years before the RNEFTS moved to RAF Linton-on-Ouse, North Yorkshire, in April 1984 and then onto RAF Topcliffe, North Yorkshire, in April 1993. In the July the RNEFTS combined with the Army Air Corps (AAC) training and became Joint Elementary Flying Training School (JEFTS), moving to RAF Barkston Heath in May 1995.

In 1996 the Royal Air Force (RAF) joined JEFTS and at this point the school operated the Slingsby Firefly training aircraft, however, in 2003 the RAF withdrew from the school, opting for Elementary Flying Training (EFT) as part of its University Air Squadrons. JEFTS was absorbed into Defence Elementary Flying Training School (No.1 EFTS) in July 2003.

703 Naval Air Squadron trained about sixty Royal Navy pilots every year. The Squadron previously used the Grob Tutor basic trainer aircraft from 2009 up until 2018, before transitioning to the Grob Prefect, a Turboprop trainer provided under the new UKMFTS contract. In 2021, responsibility for Royal Navy pilot grading transferred to 727 Naval Air Squadron at RNAS Yeovilton. Royal Navy pilots selected for the fixed-wing stream subsequently undertook Elementary Flying Training on the Prefect T1 with No. 3 Flying Training School, primarily through 57 Squadron at RAF Cranwell.

== Aircraft flown ==
Largely because of its role as a trials unit in the 1950s, 703 Naval Air Squadron has flown a large number of aircraft types, including:

- Fairey Seafox reconnaissance seaplane (June - November 1942)
- Vought Kingfisher I observation floatplane (June 1942 - March 1944)
- Supermarine Walrus amphibious maritime patrol (February - April 1943)
- Grumman Hellcat F. Mk. I fighter aircraft (1945)
- Grumman Avenger Mk.III torpedo bomber (April 1945 - July 1953)
- Fairey Barracuda Mk II torpedo and dive bomber (April 1945 - March 1946)
- Fairey Barracuda Mk III torpedo and dive bomber (April 1945 - September 1953)
- Stinson Reliant liaison and training aircraft (May 1945)
- de Havilland Mosquito FB Mk. VI fighter-bomber (June 1945 - July 1950)
- Vought Corsair Mk II fighter-bomber (July 1945 - April 1946)
- Fairey Firefly FR.I fighter/reconnaissance aircraft (August 1945 - May 1949)
- Blackburn Firebrand T.F. III strike fighter (September 1945 - March 1946)
- Grumman Hellcat F. Mk. II fighter aircraft (October - November 1945)
- Grumman Avenger Mk.II torpedo bomber (November 1945 - March 1946)
- Supermarine Seafire F Mk.45 fighter aircraft (December 1945 - April 1946)
- Avro Anson Mk I multirole training aircraft (December 1945 - April 1952)
- Hoverfly I helicopter (January 1946 - September 1947)
- Blackburn Firebrand T.F. IV strike fighter (March - June 1946)
- Airspeed Oxford training aircraft (April 1946 - August 1947)
- Blackburn Firebrand T.F. 5 strike fighter (May 1946 - March 1952)
- de Havilland Sea Mosquito TR Mk.33 torpedo bomber (June 1946 - October 1950)
- de Havilland Dominie short-haul airliner (May 1947 - October 1948)
- Supermarine Seafire F Mk.17 fighter aircraft (June 1947 - August 1949)
- Fairey Firefly FR.Mk 4 fighter/reconnaissance aircraft (July 1947 - July 1951)
- de Havilland Sea Hornet F.20 fighter aircraft (July 1947 - September 1951)
- de Havilland Vampire F.1 jet fighter (September - October 1947)
- de Havilland Mosquito PR Mk.XVI photo-reconnaissance aircraft (September 1947 - June 1948)
- Hawker Sea Fury F.10 fighter aircraft (June 1948 - February 1952)
- Hawker Sea Fury FB.11 fighter-bomber (July 1948 - March 1955)
- Gloster Meteor F.3/hooked jet fighter (August 1948 - March 1952)
- de Havilland Sea Mosquito TT Mk.39 target tug aircraft (October 1948)
- de Havilland Sea Hornet NF.21 night fighter (October 1948 - December 1951)
- de Havilland Sea Vampire F.20 jet fighter aircraft (October 1948 - August 1955)
- Fairey Firefly AS.Mk 5 anti-submarine aircraft (November 1948 - June 1954)
- de Havilland Sea Mosquito TR Mk.37 torpedo bomber (December 1948 - May 1950)
- de Havilland Vampire F.1/hooked jet fighter (February - October 1949)
- Blackburn Firebrand T.F. 5A strike fighter (January 1950)
- de Havilland Sea Hornet PR.22 photo-reconnaissance version (July 1950 - October 1953)
- de Havilland Vampire FB.5 jet fighter-bomber (July 1950 - June 1952)
- Gloster Meteor T.7 jet trainer aircraft (July 1950 - August 1955)
- Blackburn B-54 YA.8 prototype carrier-borne anti-submarine warfare aircraft (February 1951)
- Boulton Paul Sea Balliol T.21 advanced trainer aircraft (May - July 1951)
- Short Sturgeon TT.2 target tug (June - August 1951)
- Hawker Sea Fury T.20 training aircraft (June - October 1951)
- Supermarine Attacker F.1 jet fighter aircraft (July - August 1951)
- Fairey Firefly AS.Mk 6 anti-submarine aircraft (July 1951 - August 1955)
- Supermarine Attacker FB.1 jet fighter-bomber (January - April 1952)
- Hawker Sea Hawk F1 jet fighter aircraft (September 1952 - August 1955)
- Gloster Meteor F.8 jet fighter (May 1953 - January 1954)
- de Havilland Sea Vampire F.21 jet fighter aircraft (June - July 1953)
- Grumman Avenger TBM-3E anti-submarine torpedo bomber (June 1953 - June 1954)
- Fairey Gannet AS.1 anti-submarine warfare aircraft (October 1953 - August 1955)
- Grumman Avenger AS.4 anti-submarine torpedo bomber (June 1954 - August 1955)
- Westland Wyvern S.4 strike aircraft (June 1954 - August 1955)
- Supermarine Attacker FB.2 jet fighter-bomber (April - August 1955)
- Hawker Sea Hawk FB 3 jet fighter-bomber (July 1955)
- Westland Wasp HAS.1 anti-submarine warfare helicopter (January 1972 - December 1980)
- Grob Tutor T1 basic trainer aircraft (2003 - 2018)
- Grob Prefect T1 basic trainer aircraft (2018 - 2021)

== Naval air stations and other airbases ==
703 Naval Air Squadron operated from a number of naval air stations of the Royal Navy, Royal Air Force stations and other airbases in the United Kingdom and overseas:

1942 - 1944

- Royal Naval Air Station Lee-on-Solent (HMS Daedalus), Hampshire, (3 June 1942 - 1 May 1944)
  - Royal Naval Air Station Dundee (HMS Condor II), Angus, (Detachments)
  - Spare Flights:
    - Freetown, Sierra Leone, (January - December 1943)
    - Royal Naval Air Station Palisadoes (HMS Buzzard), Jamaica, (January - December 1943)
    - Royal Naval Air Station Wingfield (HMS Malagas), Cape Town, South Africa, (January - December 1943)
    - Walvis Bay, Namibia, (Detachment three aircraft 16 February - 1 April 1943)
- disbanded - (1 May 1944)

1948-1955

- Royal Air Force Thorney Island, West Sussex, (19 April 45 - 25 May 1948)
- Royal Naval Air Station Lee-on-Solent (HMS Daedalus), Hampshire, (25 May 1948 - 19 April 1950
- Royal Naval Air Station Ford (HMS Peregrine), West Sussex, (19 April 1950 - 17 August 1955)
  - Royal Air Force Thurleigh, Bedfordshire, (Westland Wyvern Detachment 16 June - 31 October 1954)
- disbanded - (17 August 1955)

1972-1980

- Royal Naval Air Station Portland (HMS Osprey), Dorset, (22 January 1972 - 19 December 1980)
- disbanded - (19 December 1980)

2003-2021

- Royal Air Force Barkston Heath, Lincolnshire, (1 April 2003 - 16 December 2021)

=== 703A Flight ===
Six Fairey Firefly

- Royal Naval Air Station Ford (HMS Peregrine), West Sussex, (17 - 22 February 1954)
- Royal Naval Air Station Arbroath (HMS Condor), Angus, (22 February - 30 June 1954)
- Royal Naval Air Station Ford (HMS Peregrine), West Sussex, (30 June - 4 July 1954)
- disbanded - (4 July 1954)

=== 703W Flight ===
Westland Wyvern S.4 IFTU

- Royal Naval Air Station Ford (HMS Peregrine), West Sussex, (4 October - 1 November 1954)
- became 827 Naval Air Squadron - (1 November 1954)

=== 703X Flight ===
Fairey Gannet AS.1 IFTU

- Royal Naval Air Station Ford (HMS Peregrine), West Sussex, (15 March - 21 December 1954)
- disbanded - (21 December 1954)

== Commanding officers ==
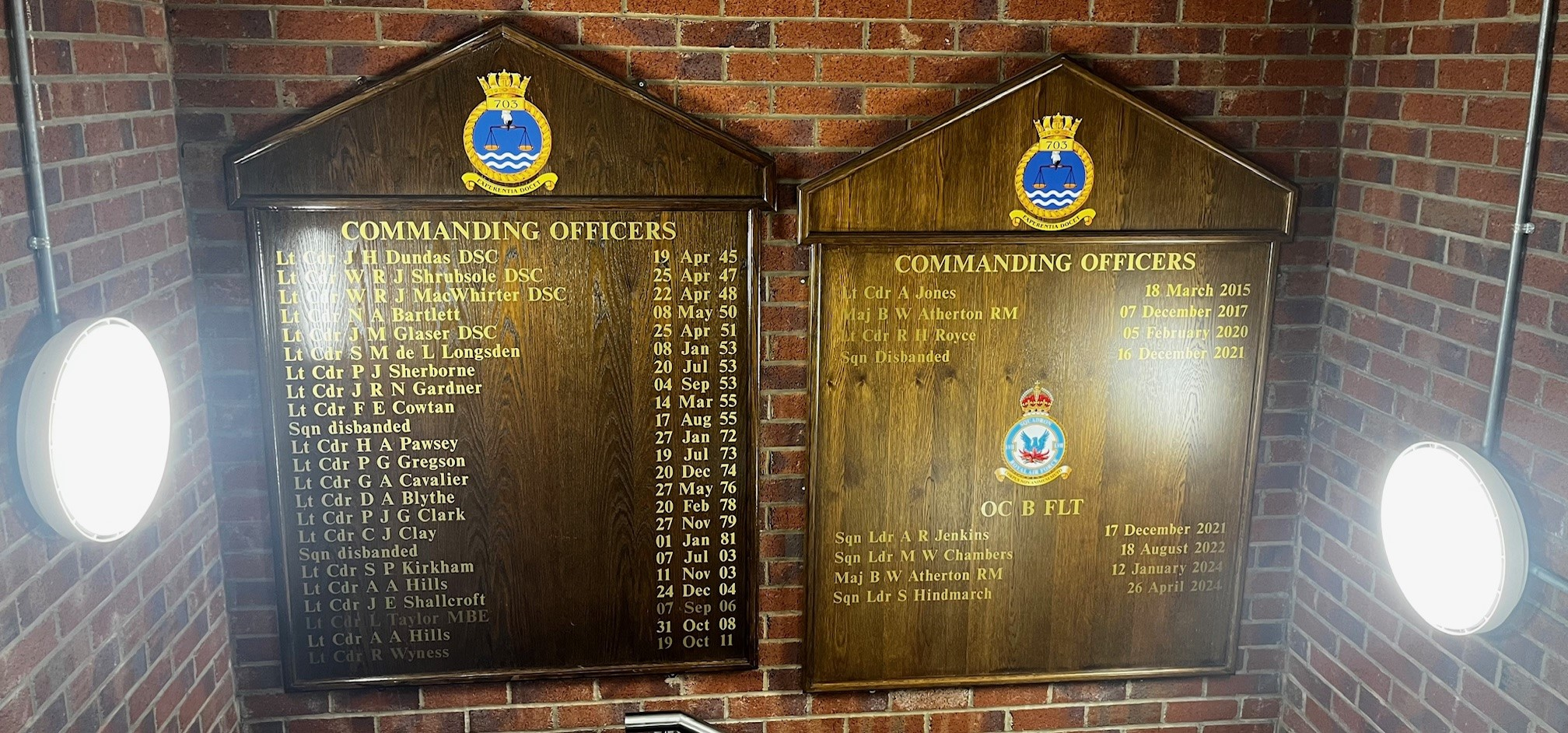
The name board of the Commanding Officers of 703 NAS at RAF Barkston Heath

List of commanding officers of 703 Naval Air Squadron with date of appointment:

1942 - 1944

- Not identified - 3 June 1942
- disbanded - 1 May 1944

1945 - 1955

- Lieutenant Commander J.H. Dundas, DSC, RN, from 19 April 1945
- Lieutenant Commander J.C.N. Shrubsole, DSC, RN, from 25 April 1947
- Lieutenant Commander W.J.R. Mac Whirter, DSC, RN, from 22 April 1948
- Lieutenant Commander N.A. Bartlett, RN, from 8 May 1950
- Lieutenant Commander J.M. Glaser, DSC, RN, from 25 April 1951
- Lieutenant Commander S.M. deL. Longsden, RN, from 8 January 1953
- Lieutenant Commander F.J. Sherborne, RN, from 20 July 1953
- Lieutenant Commander J.R.N. Gardner, DSC, RN, from 4 August 1953
- Lieutenant Commander F.E. Cowtan, RN, from 14 March 1955
- disbanded - 17 August 1955

1972 - 1980

- Lieutenant Commander H.A. Pawsey, RN, from 27 January 1972
- Lieutenant Commander P.G. Gregson, RN, from 19 July 1973
- Lieutenant Commander G.A. Cavalier, RN, from 20 December 1974
- Lieutenant Commander D.A. Blythe, MBE, RN, from 28 May 1976
- Lieutenant Commander P.J.G. Clark, RN, from 24 February 1978
- Lieutenant Commander C.J. Clay, RN, from 19 November 1979
- disbanded - 19 December 1980

2003 - 2021

- Lieutenant Commander S.P Kirkham, RN, from 7 July 2003
- Lieutenant Commander A.A Hills, RN, from 11 November 2003
- Lieutenant Commander J.E Shallcroft, RN, from 24 December 2004
- Lieutenant Commander L Taylor, MBE, RN, from 7 September 2006
- Lieutenant Commander A.A Hills, RN, from 31 October 2008
- Lieutenant Commander R Wyness, RN, from 19 October 2011
- Lieutenant Commander A Jones, RN, from 18 March 2015
- Major B.W Atherton, RM, from 7 December 2017
- Lieutenant Commander R.H Royce, RN, from 5 February 2020
- disbanded - 16 December 2021

=== 703A Flight ===
Commanding officers of A Flight, 703 Naval Air Squadron, with date of appointment:

- Lieutenant P.D. Lowndes, RN, from 16 February 1954
- disbanded - 4 July 1954

=== 703W Flight ===
Commanding officers of W Flight, 703 Naval Air Squadron, with date of appointment:

- Lieutenant Commander S.J.A. Richardson, RN, from 4 October 1954
- disbanded - 1 November 1954

=== 703X Flight ===
Commanding officers of X Flight, 703 Naval Air Squadron, with date of appointment:

- Lieutenant Commander F.E. Cowtan, RN, from 15 March 1954
- disbanded - 21 December 1954

== See also ==
- No. 3 Flying Training School RAF - manages elementary fixed wing flying training for the Royal Navy and Royal Air Force.
- No. 674 Squadron AAC - the equivalent Army Air Corps squadron, previously based at RAF Barkston Heath.
