= 52nd Naval TBR Wing =

Royal Navy Fleet Air Arm aircraft wing

- White Ensign
- Active: 26 November 1943 – 9 July 1944
- Country: United Kingdom
- Branch: Royal Navy
- Type: Naval TBR Wing
- Role: Carrier-based Torpedo, bomber and reconnaissance
- Size: Two/Three squadrons
- Part of: Fleet Air Arm
- Aircraft carrier: HMS Victorious
- Engagements: World War II: European theatre of World War II; Operation Tungsten

Commanders
- Notable commanders: See Wing Leaders

Aircraft flown
- Bomber: Fairey Barracuda

52nd Naval TBR Wing ("52 Wing") was a Fleet Air Arm torpedo bomber reconnaissance formation of the Royal Navy during the Second World War. Formed in November 1943, its original squadron allocation changed before the Wing was re-formed for HMS Victorious in January 1944. Its evntual constituent squadrons 829 and 831 Naval Air Squadrons, both equipped with Fairey Barracuda torpedo and dive bomber aircraft and subsequently participated in the Home Fleet's attacks on the German battleship Tirpitz, including Operation Tungsten in April 1944. The Wing disbanded on 9 July 1944, when 831 Squadron absorbed 829 Squadron.

== History ==
=== Formation and initial allocation ===
The Wing was planned in October 1943 for the name ship of her class of aircraft carriers HMS Implacable, with 815 and 829 Naval Air Squadrons among the units considered for the formation. The plan changed before the Wing entered service. On 26 November 1943, the 52nd Wing was formed for the Illustrious-class aircraft carrier HMS Victorious with 815 and 817 Naval Air Squadrons. When the intended aircraft carrier arrangement did not proceed, these squadrons instead embarked in the Ruler-class escort carrier HMS Begum and became associated with the 12th Naval TBR Wing. The original 52nd Wing arrangement therefore did not develop into the operational formation initially envisaged.

=== Re-formation and work-up ===
The 52nd Wing was re-formed on 5 January 1944 for HMS Victorious, with 829 and 831 Naval Air Squadrons, both equipped with Fairey Barracuda Mk.II torpedo and dive bomber aircraft. The squadrons had been preparing for carrier operations at shore establishments, including RNAS Lee-on-Solent, Hampshire and RNAS Machrihanish, Argyll and Bute. Their work-up included deck-landing training with HMS Victorious before operational deployment.

=== Operation Tungsten ===
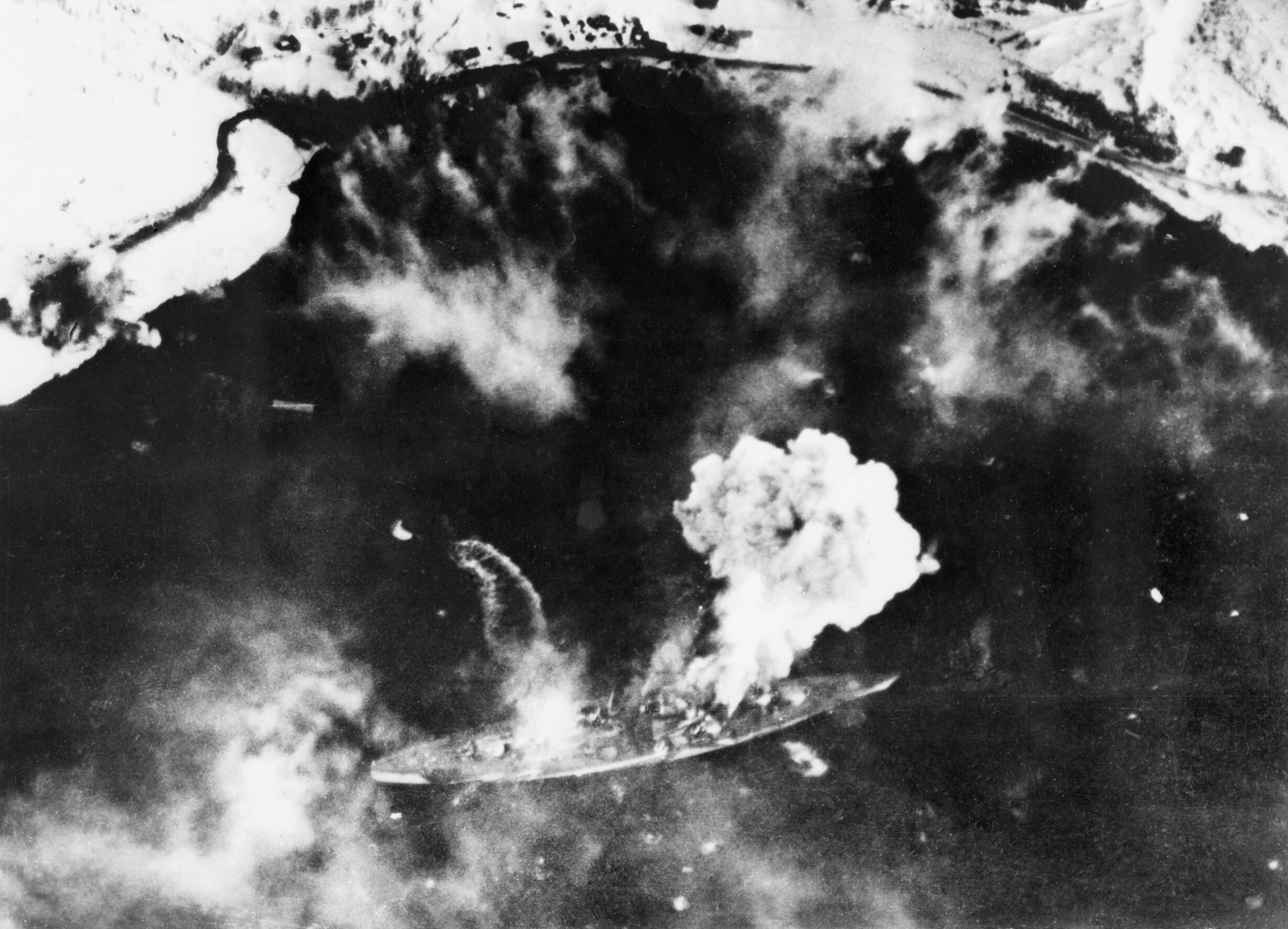
Attack on the German battleship Tirpitz on the morning of 3 April 1944

The Wing's squadrons were involved in the Home Fleet's preparations for Operation Tungsten, an attack on the German battleship Tirpitz at Kaafjord in northern Norway. The operation was carried out on 3 April 1944. The Home Fleet's war diary records that the strike force required extensive training, including a full-scale bombing and air-firing range constructed at Loch Eriboll to represent the battleship at Kaafjord. A rehearsal took place off Scapa Flow on 28 March.

The Wing was subsequently augmented by 827 Naval Air Squadron for Operation Tungsten. During the operation, 827 Squadron aircraft took part in the first strike, while 829 and 831 Naval Air Squadrons formed the 52nd Wing's second-strike contingent.

The strike was carried out by aircraft from several aircraft carriers. 827 and 829 Naval Air Squadrons aboard HMS Victorious, and 830 and 831 Naval Air Squadrons aboard HMS Furious. The participating aircraft therefore operated in a combined carrier strike force rather than as a single Wing embarked together on one ship. Forty Fairey Barracudas and eighty-one fighter aircraft took part in the two strikes. It was reported that substantial damage to Tirpitz was inflicted, with 16 bomb hits and eight probable hits assessed and recorded the loss of three Fairey Barracudas and one Grumman Hellcat during the operation.

=== Further operations and disbandment ===
After Operation Tungsten, the Home Fleet prepared further attacks against Tirpitz and conducted operations against German shipping off the Norwegian coast. The planned repeat attack under Operation Planet was abandoned because of unfavourable weather. The Wing's squadrons continued their operational service during this period, although their carrier and shore arrangements should be distinguished from the Wing's original organisation.

829 Naval Air Squadron subsequently operated against enemy shipping off Norway before returning to shore at RNAS Hatston, Mainland, Orkney. On 9 July 1944, 829 Naval Air Squadron was absorbed into 831 Naval Air Squadron, and the 52nd Naval TBR Wing disbanded.

== Squadrons ==
52nd Naval TBR Wing consisted of two Fleet Air Arm fighter squadrons during its existence:

- 815 Naval Air Squadron, (1943)
- 817 Naval Air Squadron, (1943)
- 827 Naval Air Squadron, (1944)
- 829 Naval Air Squadron, (1944)
- 831 Naval Air Squadron, (1944)

== Naval air stations and carrier deployments ==
52 Wing's shore history and carrier movements reflected changes to its original allocation and the operational requirements of the Home Fleet. The locations below distinguish the shore establishments used by its squadrons from the carriers used for training and operations.

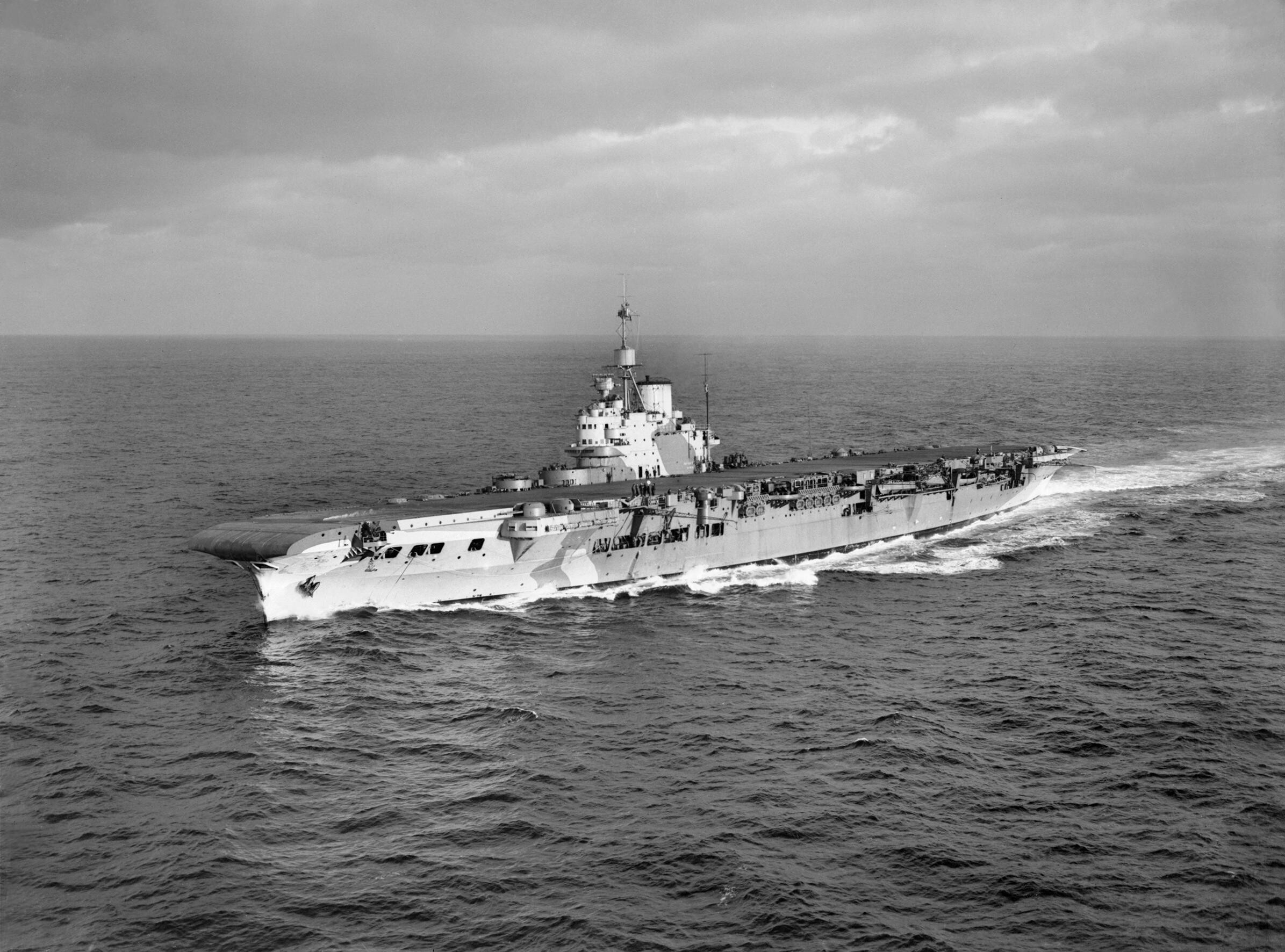
HMS Victorious

- Royal Naval Air Station Lee-on-Solent (HMS Daedalus), Hampshire.
  - 829 Naval Air Squadron re-formed at RNAS Lee-on-Solent on 1 October 1943, equipped with Fairey Barracuda Mk.II torpedo and dive bomber aircraft.
  - 831 Naval Air Squadron had re-equipped with Fairey Barracudas at RNAS Lee-on-Solent in May 1943 before joining the Wing later that year.
- Royal Naval Air Station Machrihanish (HMS Landrail), Argyll and Bute.
  - 829 and 831 Naval Air Squadrons were based at RNAS Machrihanish during the period in which they were associated with the 52nd Wing.
  - The squadrons undertook preparation for carrier service, including deck-landing training with HMS Victorious in early 1944.
- HMS Victorious
  - On 5 January 1944, the 52nd Wing was re-formed for HMS Victorious with 829 and 831 Naval Air Squadrons.
  - For Operation Tungsten on 3 April 1944, 827 and 829 Naval Air Squadrons operated from HMS Victorious as part of the combined strike force against the Tirpitz.
- HMS Furious
  - During Operation Tungsten on 3 April 1944, 830 and 831 Naval Air Squadrons operated from HMS Furious as part of the combined carrier strike force. This operational allocation should not be interpreted as a permanent transfer of the entire 52nd Wing to HMS Furious.
- Royal Naval Air Station Hatston (HMS Sparrowhawk), Mainland, Orkney.
  - Following operations against German shipping off Norway in May 1944, 829 Naval Air Squadron returned to shore at RNAS Hatston.
  - On 9 July 1944, 829 Naval Air Squadron was absorbed into 831 Naval Air Squadron, bringing the Wing's existence to an end.

== Aircraft ==
The wing's four constituent squadrons operated with two types of torpedo bomber aircraft:

- Fairey Barracuda Mk II torpedo and dive bomber (1943 - 1944)

== Wing leaders ==
The wing's recorded commanding officer chronology was:

- Lieutenant Commander J.C.N. Shrubsole, RN, from 26 November 1943
- Lieutenant Commander E.M. Britton, RN, from 5 January 1944
- Lieutenant Commander(A) F.H. Fox, RN, from 24 January 1944
- Lieutenant Commander V. Rance, OBE, RN, from 15 February 1944
- disbanded - 9 July 1944

Note: Abbreviation (A) signifies Air Branch of the RN or RNVR.

== See also ==
- Fleet Air Arm
- List of aircraft wings of the Royal Navy
- 815 Naval Air Squadron
- 817 Naval Air Squadron
- 827 Naval Air Squadron
- 829 Naval Air Squadron
- 831 Naval Air Squadron
- HMS Victorious
- HMS Furious
- Home Fleet
