= 751 Naval Air Squadron =

Inactive flying squadron of the Royal Navy's Fleet Air Arm

- Squadron badge
- Active: 1939–1944; 1945; 1947; 1951–1958
- Disbanded: 1 May 1958
- Country: United Kingdom
- Branch: Royal Navy
- Type: Fleet Air Arm Second Line Squadron
- Role: Observer Training Squadron; Trials Unit; Naval Air Radio Warfare Unit
- Size: Squadron
- Part of: Fleet Air Arm
- Home station: See Naval air stations section for full list.
- Aircraft: See Aircraft flown section for full list.

Insignia
- Squadron Badge Description: White, in base barry wavy of four blue and white overall a lightning flash in pale gold in front of two arrows in saltire points downward black (1956)
- Identification Markings: W9A+ to A4A+ AA4A+ to AA5A+ (1943); 385-388 & 810-815 (January 1956); 680-688 (March 1958)

751 Naval Air Squadron (751 NAS), also referred to as 751 Squadron, is an inactive Fleet Air Arm (FAA) naval air squadron of the United Kingdom’s Royal Navy (RN). It most recently operated de Havilland Sea Venom ECM.21 electronic countermeasure aircraft between June 1957 and May 1958.

It was initially active as an Observer Training Squadron from 1939 to 1944 as part of No.1 Observer School. 751 Naval Air Squadron formed at RNAS Ford (HMS Peregrine), West Sussex, in May 1939. Ford was attacked and bombed, in August 1940, and the following day the squadron relocated to RNAS Arbroath (HMS Condor), Angus, Scotland. Twelve months later it moved to RNAS Dundee (HMS Condor II), Dundee, remaining there until disbanding at Dundee in May 1944.

In 1945 it had a brief existence as a Trials Unit, at RNAS Machrihanish (HMS Landrail), Argyll and Bute, followed by another short reformation, during 1947, this time at RAF Watton, Norfolk. The squadron reformed for a second longer spell at Watton, from 1951, remaining there for the next six years, before moving to RNAS Culdrose (HMS Seahawk), Cornwall, in September 1957. During this period the squadron went on frequent detachments, on exercises, however, it eventually disbanded at RNAS Culdrose in May 1958 when it was renumbered as 831 Naval Air Squadron.

== History ==
=== Observer Training (1939-1944) ===
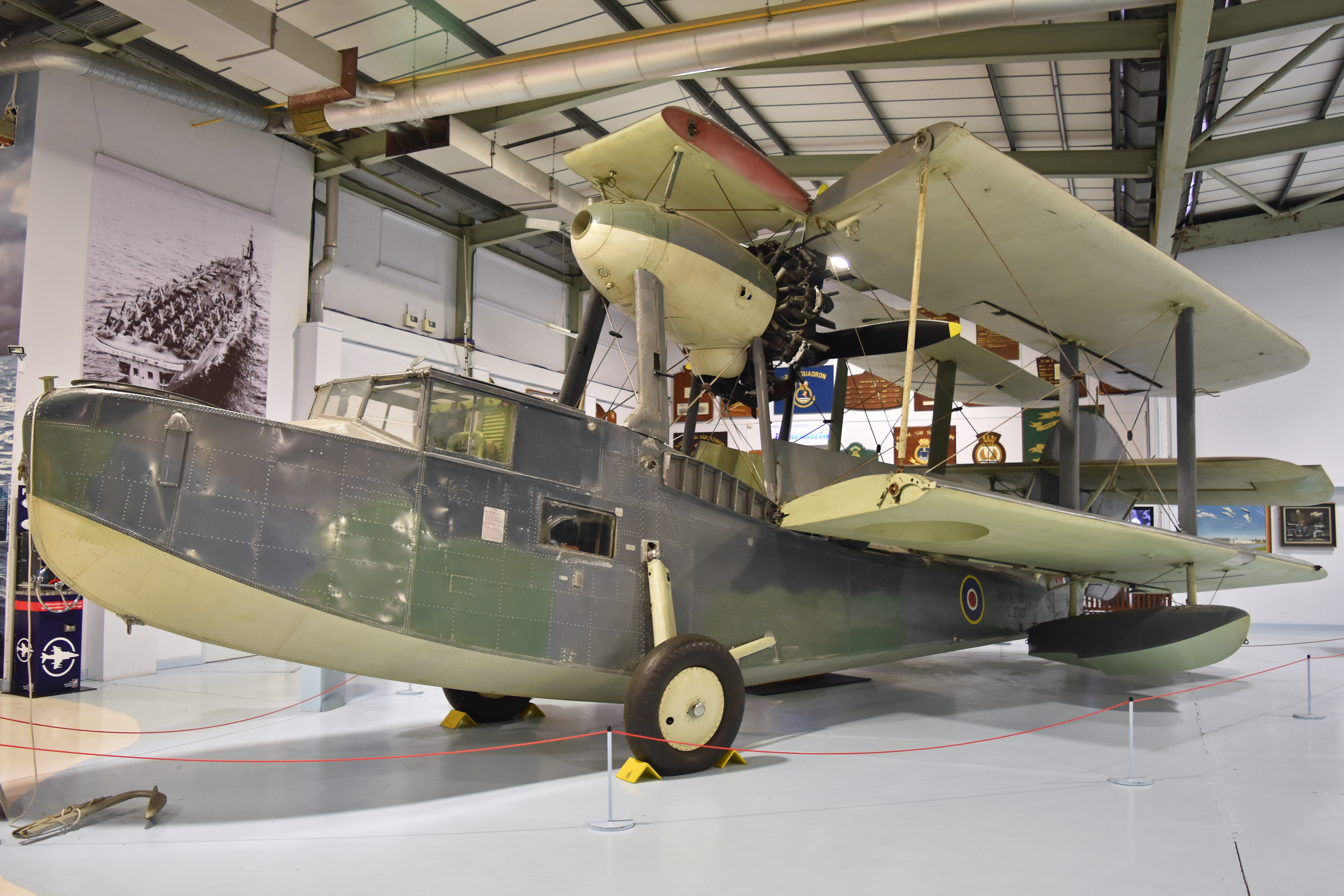
Supermarine Walrus I ‘L2301’, an example of the type used by 751 NAS

751 Naval Air Squadron formed at RNAS Ford (HMS Peregrine), in West Sussex, on 24 May 1939, as an Observer Training Squadron and being part of No.1 Observer School. The squadron was equipped with Supermarine Walrus, a biplane amphibious aircraft.

On 18 August 1940, a formation of Junkers Ju 87, or 'Stuka', dive bombers, attacked RNAS Ford as part of a large Luftwaffe force attacking airfields around Hampshire and Sussex. twenty-eight personnel were killed and seventy-five wounded in the raid, which also destroyed seventeen aircraft, damaged twenty-six more and caused significant infrastructure damage.

The following day, 751 Naval Air Squadron moved from RNAS Ford to RNAS Arbroath (HMS Condor), in East Angus, Scotland, then as part of the No.2 Observer Training School. The squadron remained at RNAS Arbroath for around twelve months, before moving to the satellite station and Seaplane base at RNAS Dundee (HMS Condor II), Dundee, Angus, on 13 August 1941, operating as a Seaplane Observer Training Squadron and continuing to use Supermarine Walrus aircraft. The squadron disbanded at Dundee on 2 May 1944.

=== Trials Unit (1945) ===
751 Naval Air Squadron reformed at RNAS Machrihanish (HMS Landrail), close to Campbeltown in Argyll and Bute, Scotland, on the 22 September 1945, as a Trials Unit when 846 Naval Air Squadron disbanded and re-numbered as 751 Naval Air Squadron. The squadron was equipped with Grumman Avenger Mk.II, an American torpedo bomber aircraft, however, the unit only lasted just over one month and it disbanded on the 31 October 1945 at Machrihanish.

=== Naval Air Radio Warfare Unit (1947) ===
751 Naval Air Squadron reformed at RAF Watton, located 9 mi (14 km) southwest of East Dereham, Norfolk, England, on the 1 March 1947. It operated Avro Anson, a British twin-engined, multi-role aircraft, and Airspeed Oxford, a twin-engine monoplane aircraft. The squadron was active for six months, disbanding on the 30 September 1947.

=== Naval Air Radio Warfare Unit (1951-1958) ===
Four years later, 751 Naval Air Squadron reformed, again at RAF Watton, on the 3 December 1951, remaining there for around the next six years until 27 September 1957 when the squadron moved to RNAS Culdrose (HMS Seahawk), located near Helston on the Lizard Peninsula of Cornwall, England.

While at RAF Watton, it participated in four separate aircraft carrier deployments, between August 1953 and November 1957. From 31 August to 2 October 1953, a detachment was embarked in the lead ship of her class, the aircraft carrier HMS Illustrious, operating with Grumman Avenger ECM.6 aircraft. In 1955, between 19 February and 15 March, a detachment spent the time operating from another lead ship of her class, the light aircraft carrier HMS Centaur, again with Grumman Avenger ECM.6. In June 1955, a detachment spent approximately two weeks, from 7 to 23, deployed to the Centaur-class light fleet carrier, HMS Bulwark, again operating the Grumman Avenger ECM.6. In November 1957, the squadron saw an approximate one week deployment, aboard the Audacious-class aircraft carrier, HMS Eagle.

751 Naval Air Squadron disbanded on 1 May 1958 when it was renumbered as 831 Naval Air Squadron at RNAS Culdrose (HMS Seahawk).

== Aircraft flown ==
751 Naval Air Squadron has operated a number of different aircraft types, including:

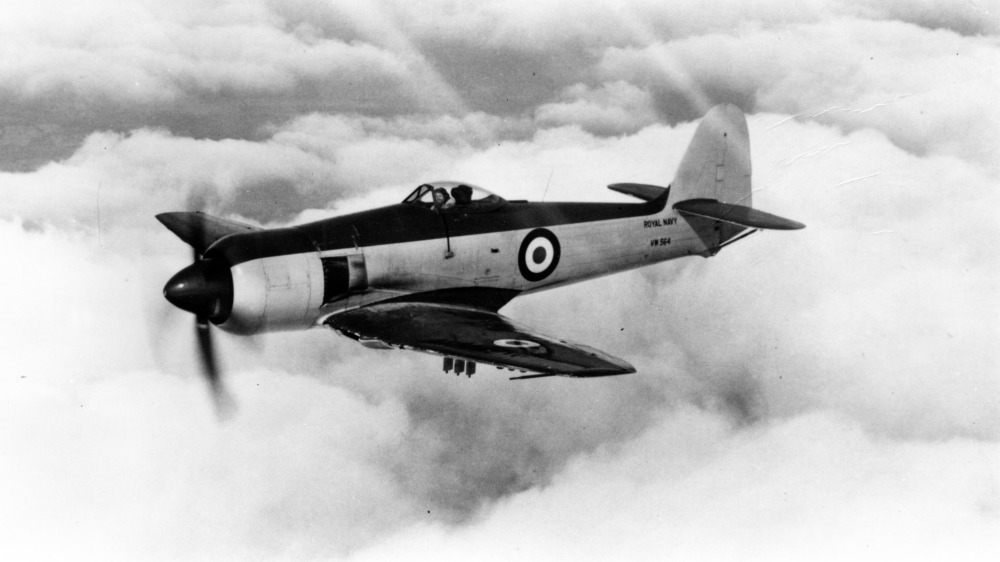
Hawker Sea Fury FB.11

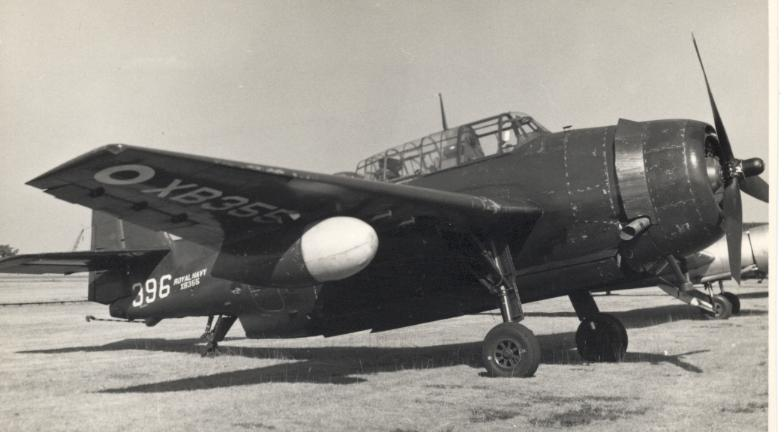
Grumman Avenger AS5

- Supermarine Walrus, amphibious maritime patrol aircraft (May 1939 - May 1944)
- Avro Anson Mk I, multi-role training aircraft (March 1947 - September 1947, February 1953 - August 1955)
- Airspeed Oxford I, training aircraft (March 1947 - September 1947)
- Fairey Firefly I, fighter aircraft (March - September 1947)
- Supermarine Seafire F Mk XV, fighter aircraft (July 1947 - September 1947)
- de Havilland Mosquito FB Mk. VI, fighter-bomber (April 1952 - February 1953)
- de Havilland Mosquito PR Mk 34, photo-reconnaissance (May 1952 - November 1954)
- de Havilland Sea Mosquito TR Mk 33, torpedo bomber (March 1952 - June 1953)
- Hawker Sea Fury FB.11, fighter-bomber (August 1952 - March 1956)
- Fairey Firefly AS.Mk 6, anti-submarine aircraft (September 1952 - March 1956)
- Grumman Avenger AS4, torpedo bomber (December 1952 - April 1958)
- Grumman Avenger ECM.6, torpedo bomber (November 1954 - April 1958)
- Grumman Avenger AS5, torpedo bomber (May 1955 - December 1955)
- de Havilland Sea Venom ECM.21, electronic countermeasure aircraft (June 1957 - May 1958)

== Naval air stations and aircraft carriers / Royal Air Force stations ==
751 Naval Air Squadron operated from a number of naval air stations of the Royal Navy, in Scotland and England, a number of Royal Navy aircraft carriers and a Royal Air Force station in England:

1939 - 1944

- Royal Naval Air Station Ford (HMS Peregrine), Sussex, (24 May 1939 - 19 August 1940)
- Royal Naval Air Station Arbroath (HMS Condor), Angus, (19 August 1940 - 13 August 1941)
- Royal Naval Air Station Dundee (HMS Condor II), Dundee, (13 August 1941 - 2 May 1944)
- disbanded - (2 May 1944)

1945

- Royal Naval Air Station Machrihanish (HMS Landrail), Argyll and Bute, (22 September 1945 - 31 October 1945)
- disbanded - (31 October 1945)

1947

- Royal Air Force Watton, Norfolk, (1 March 1947 - 30 September 1947)
- disbanded - (30 September 1947)

1951 - 1958

- Royal Air Force Watton, Norfolk, (3 December 1951 - 27 September 1957)
  - HMS Illustrious, Illustrious-class aircraft carrier, (Detachment 31 August 1953 - 2 October 1953)
  - HMS Centaur Centaur-class aircraft carrier, (Detachment 19 February 1955 - 15 March 1955)
  - HMS Bulwark Centaur-class aircraft carrier (Detachment 7 - 23 June 1955)
  - Royal Naval Air Station Hal Far (HMS Falcon), Malta, (Detachment 30 January - 20 February 1956)
  - Valkenburg Naval Air Base, Katwijk, Netherlands, (Detachment two aircraft 1 - 15 October 1956)
  - RN Air Section Gibraltar, Gibraltar, (Detachment three aircraft 31 January - 28 February 1957)
  - Royal Naval Air Station Lossiemouth (HMS Fulmar), Moray, (Detachment two aircraft 30 May - 6 June 1957)
  - Royal Naval Air Station Lossiemouth (HMS Fulmar), Moray, (Detachment four aircraft 2 - 11 September 1957)
  - Royal Naval Air Station Brawdy (HMS Goldcrest), Pembrokeshire, (Detachment two aircraft 11 - 19 September 1957)
- Royal Naval Air Station Culdrose (HMS Seahawk), Cornwall, (27 September 1957 - 1 May 1958)
  - Royal Naval Air Station Lossiemouth (HMS Fulmar), Moray, (Detachment two aircraft 5 - 3 November 1957)
  - HMS Eagle, Audacious-class aircraft carrier, (Detachment three aircraft 14 - 23 November 1957)
  - Royal Naval Air Station Hal Far (HMS Falcon), Malta, (Detachment four aircraft 'B' Flight) (19 February - 20 March 1958)
- became - 831 Naval Air Squadron (1 May 1958)

== Commanding officers ==
List of commanding officers of 751 Naval Air Squadron with date of appointment:

1939 - 1944

- Lieutenant Commander(A) J.H. Sender, RN, from 24 May 1939
- Lieutenant Commander(A) F. Leach, RNVR, from 1 February 1941
- Lieutenant Commander(A) H. Jones, RNVR, from 1 December 1941
- Lieutenant Commander D.H. Angel, RN, from 5 May 1943
- Lieutenant Commander T.E. Sargent, RD, RNVR, from 2 February 1944
- disbanded - 2 May 1944

1945

- unknown (September - October 1945)

1947

- Lieutenant R.F.J. Forty, RN, from 1 March 1947
- disbanded - 30 September 1947

1951 - 1958

- Lieutenant Commander P. Winter, DSC, RN, from 3 December 1951
- Lieutenant Commander G.R. Woolsteon, RN, from 25 March 1952
- Lieutenant Commander W.J. Cooper, RN, from 26 June 1954
- Lieutenant Commander J.T. Williams, RN, from 16 July 1956
- Lieutenant Commander W.J. Hanks, RN, from 24 March 1958
- became - 831 Naval Air Squadron

Note: Abbreviation (A) signifies Air Branch of the RN or RNVR.
