= 829 Naval Air Squadron =

Inactive flying squadron of the Royal Navy's Fleet Air Arm

- Squadron badge
- Active: 1940–1942; 1943–1944; 1964–1993; 2004–2018
- Disbanded: 28 March 2018
- Country: United Kingdom
- Branch: Royal Navy
- Type: Torpedo Bomber Reconnaissance squadron
- Role: Carrier-based: anti-submarine warfare (ASW); anti-surface warfare (ASuW)
- Part of: Fleet Air Arm
- Mottos: Non effugient (Latin for 'They shall not escape')
- Aircraft: See Aircraft operated section for full list.
- Engagements: World War II: European theatre of World War II; Mediterranean and Middle East theatre of World War II; Falklands War; Gulf War
- Battle honours: East Indies 1941; Matapan 1941; Mediterranean 1941; Crete 1941; Diego Suarez 1942; Norway 1944; Falkland Islands 1982; Kuwait 1991

Insignia
- Squadron Badge Description: Blue, base barry wavy of four white and blue a kingfisher hovering proper (1965)
- Identification Markings: 4A+ (Albacore); 3A+ (Swordfish); 4A+ (Barracuda); 511-519 (Whirlwind); 991-994 (Wasp March - December 1964); 500-507 (Wasp 1965-80); 600-607 (Wasp January 1980 - March 1988); 320-477 (Wasp Ships' Flights in series January 1965 - March 1988); 600-607 (Lynx HQ); 610-614 (Lynx August 1986 - March 1993); 328-479 (Lynx Ships' Flights in series September 1986 - March 1993); 500-505 (Merlin May 2004); 501-509 (Merlin Ships' Flights January 2007)
- Fin Shore Codes: PO (Whirlwind); CU (Wasp March - December 1964); PO (Wasp 1965 - March 1988); PO (Lynx); CU (Merlin)

829 Naval Air Squadron (829 NAS), also referred to as 829 Squadron, was a Fleet Air Arm (FAA) naval air squadron of the United Kingdom's Royal Navy (RN). Before it was decommissioned in March 2018, it operated the AgustaWestland Merlin HM2 helicopter.

The squadron was active twice during the Second World War and operated Fairey Albacore, Fairey Swordfish and Fairey Barracuda. It reformed in 1964 and flew Westland Wasp, Westland Whirlwind, Westland Wessex and Westland Lynx helicopters until 1993. It reformed again in 2004 with AgustaWestland Merlin HM1.

== History ==
=== Torpedo Strike Reconnaissance squadron (1940–1942) ===
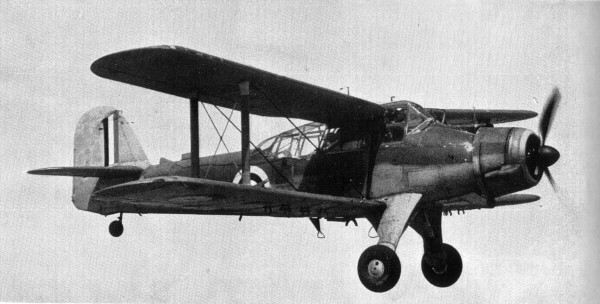
Fairey Albacore; an example of the type used by 829 Squadron

829 Naval Air Squadron was established at RNAS Ford (HMS Peregrine), West Sussex, on 15 June 1940, as a Torpedo Strike Reconnaissance (TSR) squadron equipped with nine Fairey Albacore torpedo bombers. A detachment was deployed to RNAS Campbeltown, Argyll, in July, before re assembling at that location in late September.

In October, from RAF St Eval, Cornwall, the squadron initiated a series of nighttime bombing raids targeting shipping and docks in Brest, France, resulting in the loss of the Commanding Officer on 9 October.

In the next month, the squadron was assigned to the Illustrious-class aircraft carrier HMS Formidable, which then sailed to escort the convoy WS-5A to West Africa and Cape Town. Part of the convoy came into contact with the German heavy cruiser Admiral Hipper, but the aircraft of 829 Squadron failed to sight her.

Departing from Cape Town in January 1941, the vessel journeyed towards the Red Sea, where its aircraft conducted assaults on Mogadishu and Massawa in February. Following transit through the Suez Canal, the squadron was required to partially re-equip with Fairey Swordfish aircraft due to incurred losses.

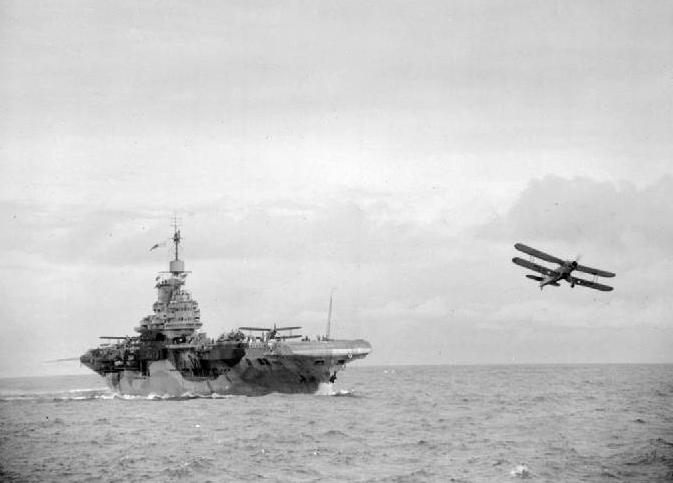
HMS Formidable and a Fairey Albacore

During the Battle of Matapan, which occurred in late March, one of the squadron's Fairey Albacores successfully struck the Italian battleship Vittorio Veneto, although the Commanding Officer tragically lost his life due to being shot down. Subsequent operations in the Mediterranean included an assault on the airfield located on Scarpanto Island amidst the retreat from Crete at the end of May; however, the ship sustained significant damage on 26 May. Following a period stationed in Cyprus, the Albacores were withdrawn, and the aircraft subsequently operated from Lydda, Palestine, for a duration, targeting Vichy French shipping during the Syrian invasion. In July, the squadron re-embarked to conduct anti-submarine patrols with six Fairey Swordfish while the ship was en route for repairs in the US, passing through Cape Town.

The squadron was stationed in Jamaica from 23 August to 2 December at RNAS Palisadoes (HMS Buzzard), where it joined sister ship HMS Illustrious for a duration of six days to navigate to Norfolk, Virginia. Subsequently, it re-embarked in HMS Formidable on 10 December for the return journey to the United Kingdom. The squadron utilised RNAS Eastleigh (HMS Raven) and later RNAS Lee-on-Solent (HMS Daedalus), both Hampshire, as operational bases, re-equipping with twelve Fairey Swordfish II, equipped with Air-to-surface-vessel radar (ASV) radar.

In March 1942, the squadron reconnected with the aircraft carrier HMS Illustrious. After departing from Cape Town, it took part in an assault on Diego Suarez amid the invasion of Madagascar. The operation resulted in successful strikes against the Vichy French submarines Bévéziers and Le Héros, as well as a sloop and an escort vessel, albeit with the loss of five aircraft. Following patrols in the Indian Ocean from June to August, the squadron offered support in September for operations targeting the remaining Vichy forces in southern Madagascar.

Following this, HMS Illustrious sailed to Durban for a refit, and whilst there 829 Squadron was amalgamated with 810 Naval Air Squadron at RN Air Section Durban, located at SAAF Station Stamford Hill, Durban, on 7 October 1942.

=== Torpedo Bomber Reconnaissance squadron (1943–1944) ===
829 Squadron reformed as a Torpedo Bomber Reconnaissance (TBR) squadron at RNAS Lee-on-Solent on 1 October 1943, with twelve Fairey Barracuda Mk.II, a torpedo and dive bomber aircraft, it became part of the 52nd Naval TBR Wing. The squadron embarked on the Illustrious-class aircraft carrier HMS Victorious on 12 February and the squadron participated in an assault on the Tirpitz in the Kåfjord, Norway on 3 April 1944, part of Operation Tungsten, during which it lost two aircraft. A subsequent mission in May 1944 was called off, resulting in the squadron focusing on anti-shipping operations along the Norwegian coastline. On 9 July, it integrated into 831 Squadron, which was also stationed aboard the carrier.

=== Wasp, Whirlwind and Wessex (1964-1988) ===
829 Squadron was reformed at RNAS Culdrose (HMS Seahawk), Cornwall, on 4 March 1964. The squadron was formed from a nucleus of No. 700W Flight, which was the training unit for Westland Wasp helicopter crews. Its task was to provide helicopter detachments to operate from small ships and survey vessels, the Wasp performing in the role of a medium-range anti-submarine torpedo-carrying helicopter. The first four such flights were allocated to the Leander-class frigates HMS Leander, HMS Dido and HMS Penelope and the Tribal-class frigate HMS Mohawk.

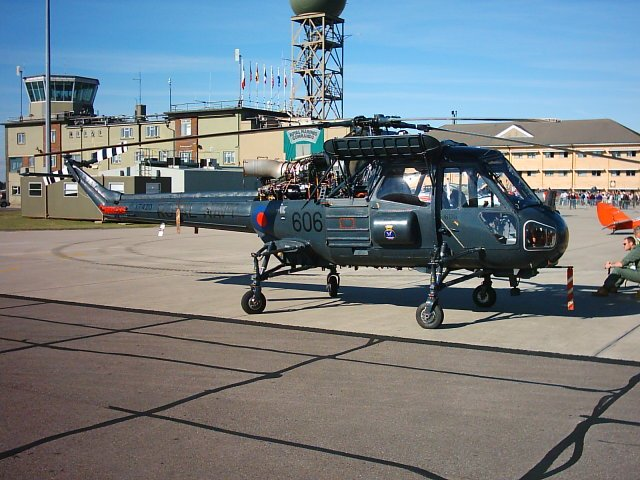
Wasp HAS1 in markings of 829 NAS, HQ Flt at RNAS Yeovilton, 2005.

The Westland Wasp represented the inaugural Fleet Air Arm helicopter that was utilised extensively from platforms situated on frigates and various smaller vessels. The initial full production HAS.1 conducted its maiden flight in January 1963.

In December, the squadron transferred the responsibility of Wasp conversion to 706 Squadron, subsequently relocating to RNAS Portland (HMS Osprey), Dorset, where it also assumed the Westland Whirlwind Fleet Requirements Unit (FRU) duties of the disbanding 771 Squadron, returning these responsibilities when that squadron was reestablished in June 1967. In the initial phases of small ship helicopter operations, Flights were established for the length of the ships' General Service commissions, dissolving upon completion, with a new Flight being created for the subsequent commission. Beginning in 1971, Flights continued to be in commission with a gradual personnel transition, transferring entirely to other ships when the parent ship was decommissioned for refitting or disposal. Furthermore, from approximately 1977 onwards, all Flights were assigned numbers.

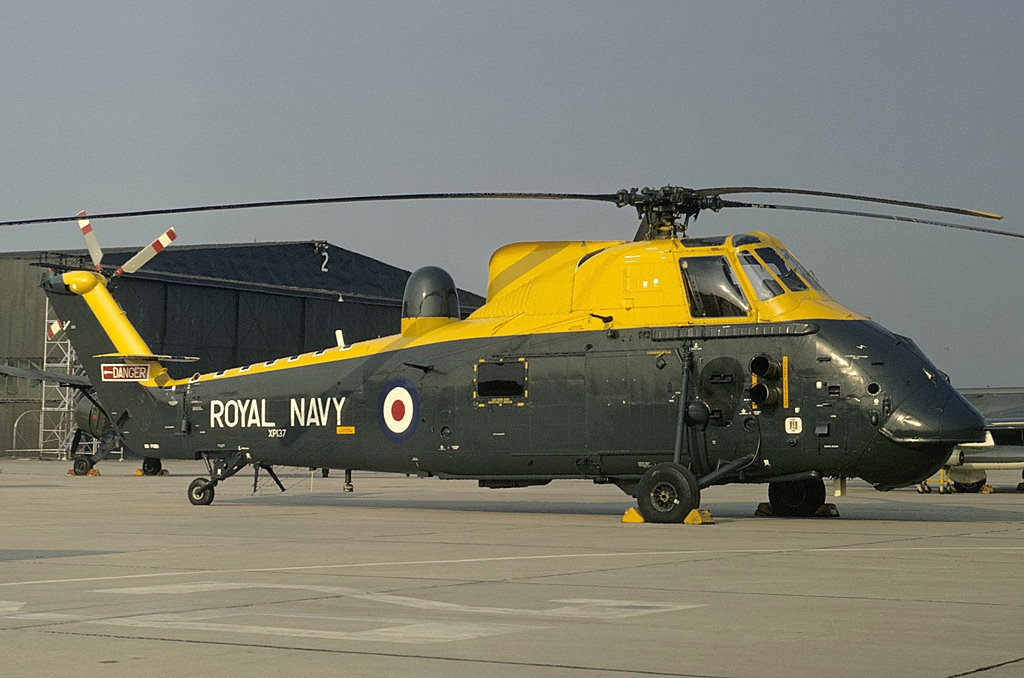
Westland Wessex HAS.3; an example of the type used by 829 Squadron

In 1966, 829 NAS also received two Wessex HU5s for operation from the Royal Fleet Auxiliaries Regent and Resource. Responsibility for the ice patrol ship HMS Protector was also taken over in 1966, initially using Whirlwind HAR1s. These were soon replaced by Whirlwind HAR9s, which transferred to HMS Endurance in 1968, and were eventually replaced by Wasp helicopters in 1976.

The squadron assumed control of Wessex HAS.1s that were deployed from County-class destroyers, with a gradual transition to HAS.3s beginning in 1969. In June 1970, the responsibility for these Wessex Flights was handed over to 737 Squadron at RNAS Portland. 703 Squadron was re-established at RNAS Portland in January 1972, taking on the operational training role for 829's Wasp, until its disbandment in January 1981. 829 Squadron's aircraft were involved in the Cod War with Iceland during 1974 and 1975–76, and subsequently participated in the Falklands Task Force in 1982.

The Wasp training was reassigned to 829 Squadron in January 1981. In August 1982, the operation of Wessex HAS3 anti-submarine detachments was returned to 737 Squadron.

==== Falklands War ====
Eleven Westland Wasp HAS1 helicopters of 829 NAS participated in the Falklands War in 1982. They were embarked in the Type 21 frigate HMS Active, the Rothesay-class frigatees HMS Yarmouth and Plymouth, the ice patrol ship HMS Endurance, MV Contender Bezant and the survey ships HMS Hecla, Herald, and Hydra. On 25 April 1982, the Argentinian submarine Santa Fe was spotted by a Wessex HAS3 from HMS Antrim. The Wessex then attacked it with depth charges. HMS Plymouth launched a Wasp HAS1 helicopter, and HMS Brilliant launched a Westland Lynx HAS2. The Lynx attacked the submarine with a MK 46 torpedo, and also strafed it with its pintle-mounted GPMG; the Wessex also fired on Santa Fe with its GPMG. The Wasp from HMS Plymouth as well as two other Wasps launched from Endurance fired AS.12 anti-ship missiles at the submarine, scoring hits. Santa Fe was damaged badly enough to prevent her from submerging. The crew abandoned the submarine at the jetty at King Edward Point on South Georgia and surrendered to the British forces, thus becoming the first casualty of the sea war, as well as the first direct engagement by the Royal Navy Task Force.

Until the Wasp was retired in 1988, the squadron remained responsible for all Wasp-equipped Ship's Flights. This led to several Wasps from the squadron, re-painted as a fictional HMS Hero Flight, being used in the popular 1970s BBC television drama series Warship.

=== Lynx (1986-1993) ===
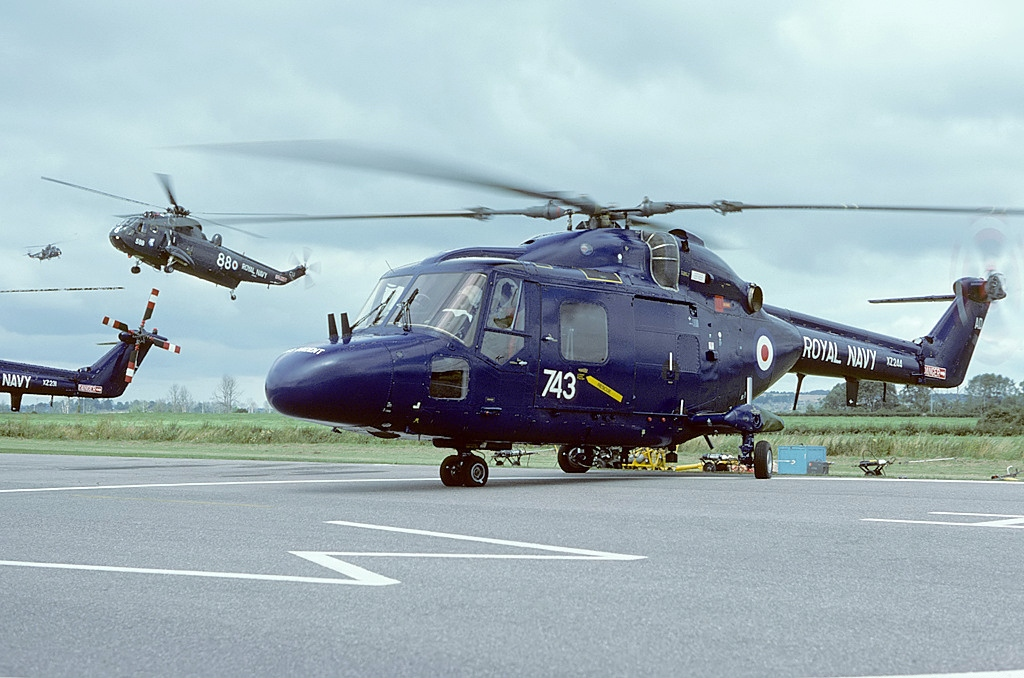
Westland Lynx HAS.2 of 829 Squadron for HMS Ardent

From September 1986, 829 parented a number of Lynx Flights transferred from 815 Squadron, with more Flights transferring in 1987 and 1988 and eventually the squadron had up to 30 Lynx. Flights were regularly deployed on the Armilla patrol and the squadron was awarded the Boyd Trophy jointly with 815 Squadron in 1988 for their operational contribution to the RN presence in the Gulf. Several Flights were involved in offensive operations in the northern Gulf between August 1990 and February 1991.

==== Persian Gulf War ====
Between August 1990 and February 1991, flights from 829 Squadron participated in the Persian Gulf War. Six Lynx helicopters armed with Sea Skua missiles were deployed on four Royal Navy frigates.

The first success came when Lynx 335 from HMS Cardiff (D108), operating with a U.S. Seahawk, destroyed a minesweeper or landing vessel. Lynx 335, alongside HMS Gloucester (D96)'s Lynx and U.S. forces, subsequently destroyed two Iraqi anti-aircraft artillery batteries on offshore oil rigs off Kuwait. On 24 January 1991, Lynx 335 attacked three Iraqi vessels off Qaruh Island, sinking two minesweepers and attempting to capture a minelayer, which was scuttled by her crew. Quaruh was later captured by coalition forces, becoming the first Kuwaiti territory liberated.

On 29 January, Royal Navy helicopters spotted 17 Iraqi landing craft involved in an attempted amphibious assault supporting the Battle of Khafji. Lynxes from HMS Brazen (F91), Gloucester and Cardiff sank two, while the rest were damaged, sunk or dispersed by U.S. carrier-borne aircraft and Royal Navy Westland Sea King helicopters.

On 30 January, a convoy of three Polnochny-class landing ships, three TNC-45 fast-attack craft and a single Type 43 minelayer was attacked. HMS Gloucester (D96)'s Lynx destroyed a TNC-45, while Cardiff and Brazen's Lynxes attacked the Type 43. Other vessels were damaged, including a Polnochny later destroyed by RAF SEPECAT Jaguars. On 8 February, Lynx 335 attacked a Zhuk-class patrol boat, and on 11 February, sank another.

In total, 829 NAS Lynxes sank 15 Iraqi ships, at least five by a single helicopter, Lynx 335. The squadron was disbanded on 26 March 1993, and its Lynx flights absorbed by 815 NAS.

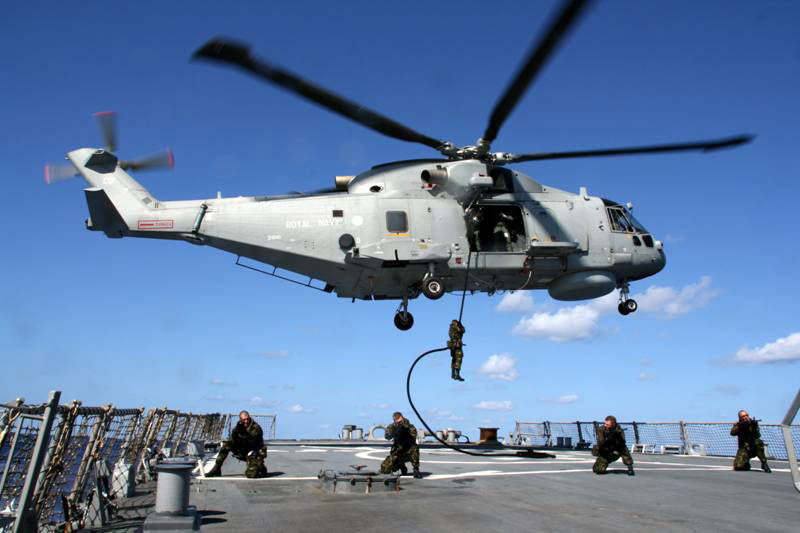
A Merlin HM1 from HMS Monmouth flight, 829 NAS, 2007.

=== Merlin (2004–2018) ===
The squadron was officially recommissioned on 21 October 2004 at RNAS Culdrose, located in Cornwall, utilising the AgustaWestland Merlin HM.1. Initially, 829 Squadron supplied three flights for the following Type 23 frigates: HMS Lancaster, HMS Monmouth and HMS Westminster. Additionally, flights for HMS Northumberland, HMS Richmond, and HMS Somerset were expected to be integrated into the squadron during the years 2005 and 2006.

The following ships were allocated flights from 829 NAS as well: HMS Montrose, Kent, Portland and HMS St Albans. The remaining four Type 23 frigates operate Westland Lynx HMA.8s of 815 Naval Air Squadron.

As of 2012 829 NAS has five ship's flights in support of six Type 23 frigates.

The squadron took on Merlin HM.2 and operated from mainly Type 23 frigates.

- 01 Flight: Aboard HMS St Albans between November 2015 and present day
- 03 Flight: Aboard HMS Sutherland during October 2015.
- 04 Flight: Aboard HMS Somerset during November 2014.

04 Flight became 02 Flight in May 2016.

In December 2017, the three Flights were renamed to reflect Squadron heritage. 01 Flight, which was associated with HMS St Albans, was renamed Tungsten Flight. 02 Flight, linked with HMS Westminster, was henceforth referred to as Kingfisher Flight, while 03 Flight, allocated to HMS Northumberland, was designated as Mohawk Flight.

The squadron decommissioned on 28 March 2018, with the unit's aircraft and personnel becoming part of 814 Naval Air Squadron, also based at RNAS Culdrose.

== Aircraft operated ==
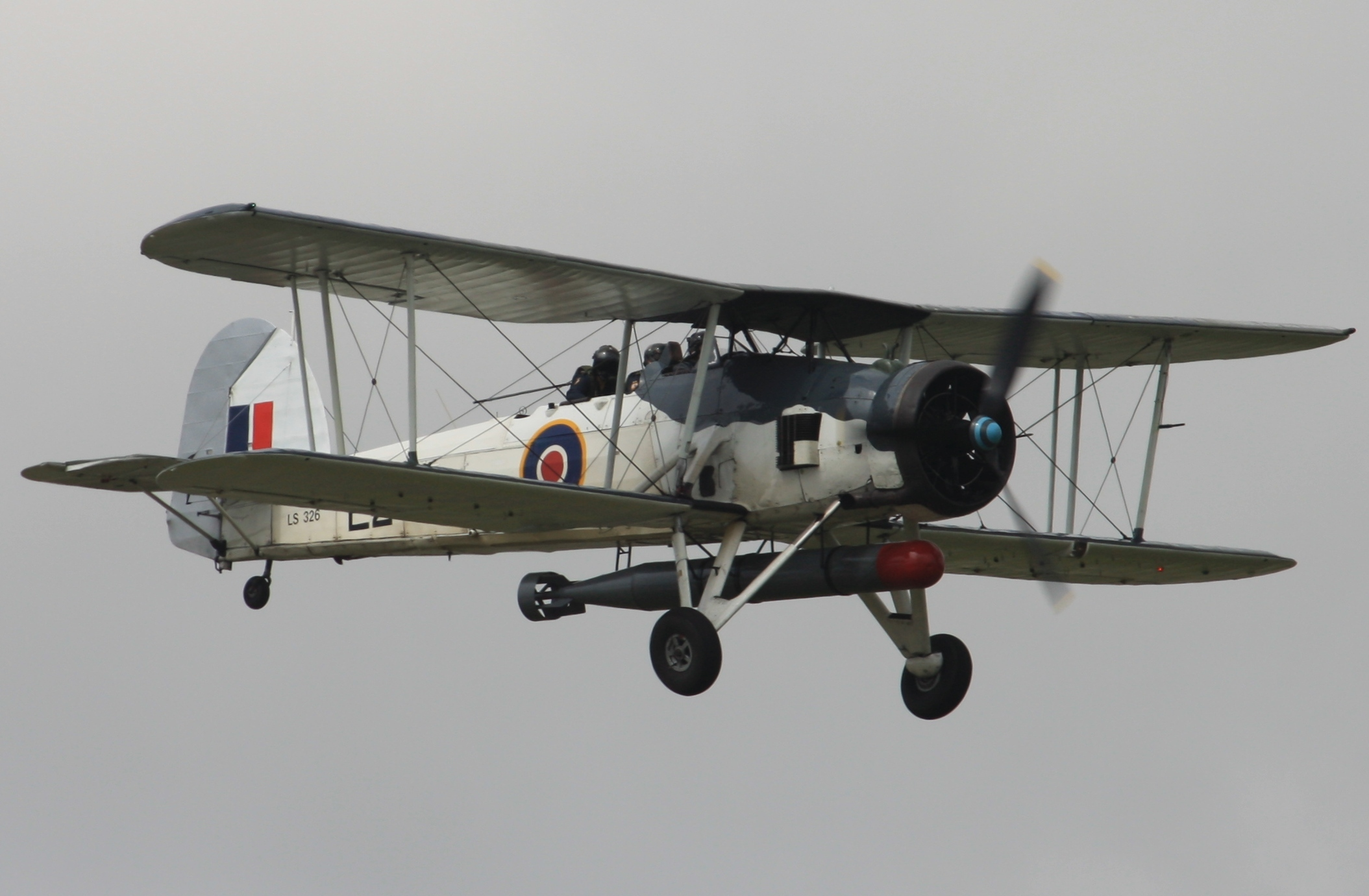
Fairey Swordfish II

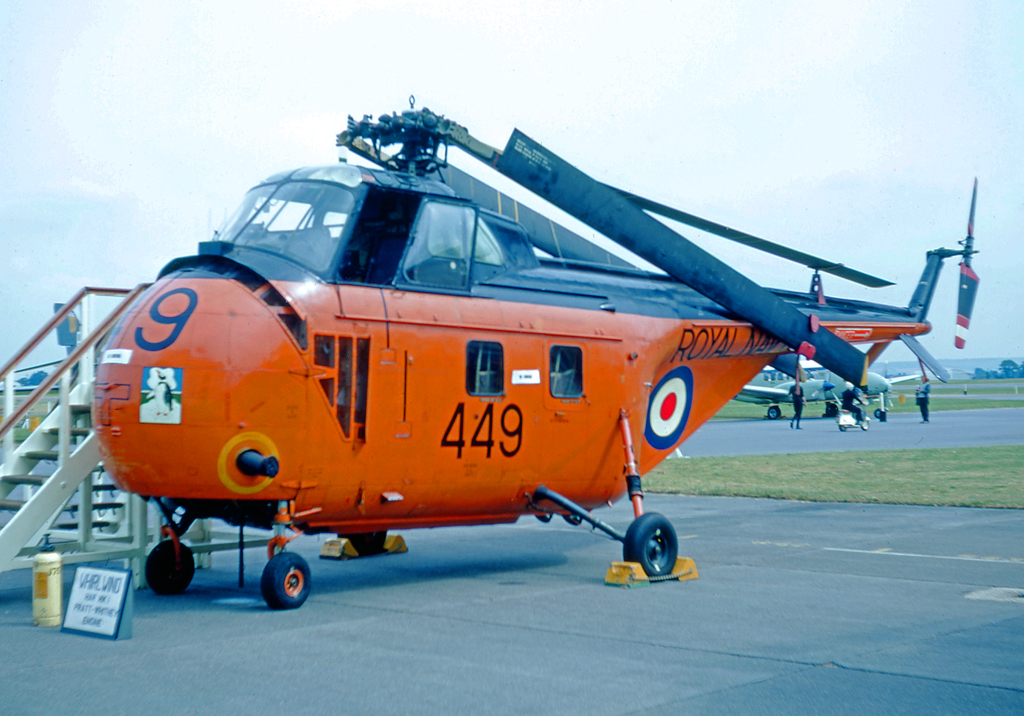
Westland Whirlwind HAR.1

The squadron operated a variety of different aircraft and marks of aircraft:

- Fairey Albacore torpedo bomber (June 1940 - August 1941)
- Fairey Swordfish I torpedo bomber (July 1940 - December 1941)
- Fairey Swordfish II torpedo bomber (December 1941 - October 1942)
- Fairey Barracuda Mk II torpedo and dive bomber (October 1943 - July 1944)
- Westland Wessex HAS.1 anti-submarine warfare helicopter (March 1964 - June 1970)
- Westland Wasp HAS.1 anti-submarine warfare helicopter (March 1964 - May 1988)
- Westland Whirlwind HAR.1 search and rescue helicopter (December 1964 - May 1966)
- Westland Whirlwind HAS.7 anti-submarine warfare helicopter (December 1964 - June 1967)
- Westland Wessex HAS.3 anti-submarine warfare helicopter (June 1969 - June 1970)
- Westland Lynx HAS.2 anti-submarine warfare helicopter (September 1986 - September 1988)
- Westland Lynx HAS.3 anti-submarine warfare helicopter (September 1986 - March 1993)
- AgustaWestland Merlin HM1 anti-submarine warfare helicopter (October 2004 - December 2014)
- AgustaWestland Merlin HM2 anti-submarine warfare helicopter (January 2014 - March 2018)

== Battle honours ==
The following eight Battle Honours have been awarded to 829 Naval Air Squadron.

- East Indies 1941
- Matapan 1941
- Mediterranean 1941
- Crete 1941
- Diego Suarez 1942
- Norway 1944
- Falkland Islands 1982
- Kuwait 1991

== Assignments ==
829 Naval Air Squadron was assigned as needed to form part of a number of larger units:

- 52nd Naval TBR Wing - (5 January - 9 July 1944)

== Commanding officers ==
List of commanding officers of 829 Naval Air Squadron:

1940 - 1942

- Lieutenant Commander O.S. Stevinson, RN, 15 June 1940 ( (POW) 9 October 1940)
- Lieutenant Commander J. Dalyell-Stead, RN, from 12 October 1940 ( † 29 March 1941)
- Lieutenant Commander L.C.B. Ashburner, RN, from 29 March 1941
- Lieutenant Commander F.M. Griffiths, RN, from 24 December 1941
- disbanded - 7 October 1942

1943 - 1944

- Lieutenant Commander(A) G.P.C. Williams, DSC, RN, from 1 October 1943
- Lieutenant Commander(A) D.W. Phillips, DSC, RN, from 3 March 1944
- disbanded - 10 July 1944

1964 - 1993

- Lieutenant Commander K.M. Mitchell, DFC, RN, from 4 March 1964
- Lieutenant Commander J.R.J. Rutherford, RN, from 1 December 1964
- Lieutenant Commander J.M. Shrives, RN, from 13 September 1965
- Lieutenant Commander N. Unsworth, RN, from 14 December 1967
- Lieutenant Commander M. Forrest, RN, from 19 September 1969
- Lieutenant Commander B.G. Skinner, RN, from 26 July 1971
- Lieutenant Commander N.C.H. James, RN, from 26 February 1973
- Lieutenant Commander M.W. Attrill, RN, from 17 July 1974
- Lieutenant Commander D.A. Scott, RN, from 12 March 1976
- Lieutenant Commander A.L. Horton, RN, from 12 December 1977
- Lieutenant Commander N.P.M. Whinney, RN, from 18 May 1979
- Lieutenant Commander C.J. Clay, RN, from 17 December 1980
- Lieutenant Commander M.J. Mullane, RN, from 1 September 1981
- Lieutenant Commander G.C. Kent, RN, from 7 December 1983
- Lieutenant Commander W.A. Pollock, RN, from 12 February 1985
- Lieutenant Commander J.P.S. Greenop, RN, from 7 April 1987
- Lieutenant Commander M.R. Legg, RN, from 20 July 1989
- Lieutenant Commander B.S. Leyshon, RN, from 26 June 1990
- Lieutenant Commander P.A. McKay, RN, from 20 May 1992
- disbanded - 26 March 1993

2004 - 2018

- Lieutenant Commander P.R.J. Munro-Lott, RN, from 23 August 2004
- Lieutenant Commander S. Deacon, RN, from 14 December 2005
- Lieutenant Commander D. Goldsmith, RN, from 22 August 2006
- Lieutenant Commander B.J. Franklin, RN, from 29 July 2008 (Commander 30 June 2009)
- Lieutenant Commander M.A.E. Bravery, RN, from 10 October 2009 (Commander 30 June 2010)
- Lieutenant Commander S.J. Windebank, RN, from 10 January 2012 (Commander 30 June 2012)
- Lieutenant Commander P.R. Beacham, RN, from 19 February 2014
- Lieutenant Commander K. Burbidge, RN, from 17 May 2016 (Commander 30 June 2017)
- disbanded - 28 March 2018
