= 831 Naval Air Squadron =

Inactive flying squadron of the Royal Navy's Fleet Air Arm

- Squadron badge
- Active: 1941–1944; 1955–1957; 1958–1966; 2014
- Disbanded: 1 October 2014
- Country: United Kingdom
- Branch: Royal Navy
- Type: Torpedo Bomber Reconnaissance squadron
- Role: Carrier-based: anti-submarine warfare (ASW); anti-surface warfare (ASuW); Electronic warfare; Unmanned surveillance and reconnaissance ISTAR
- Part of: Fleet Air Arm
- Home station: See Naval air stations section for full list.
- Mottos: Aquila non capit muscat (Latin for 'Eagles do not catch flies')
- Aircraft: See Aircraft operated section for full list.
- Engagements: World War II
- Battle honours: Diego Suarez 1942; Malta Convoys 1942; Norway 1944; Sabang 1944; East Indies 1944

Insignia
- Squadron Badge Description: White, issuant from water barry wavy blue and white of eight in base a clenched gauntlet proper upon which is perched an eagle affronty black wings elevated and inverted (1943)
- Identification Markings: 4A+ (Albacore); 5A+ (Barracuda); 143–149 (Wyvern in error initially); 380–388 (Wyvern); 380–383 (Avenger); 265–268 (Avenger March 1959); 270–279 (Gannet/Sea Venom/Sea Vampire/Sea Prince); to 381–398 (March 1962)
- Fin Carrier Codes: J:O (Wyvern)

831 Naval Air Squadron (831 NAS), also known as 831 Squadron, is an inactive Fleet Air Arm (FAA) naval air squadron of the United Kingdom’s Royal Navy (RN). It most recently operated as 831 Flight with Boeing Insitu ScanEagle RM.1 between January and October 2014.

The squadron, established in April 1941, served as a carrier-based unit that initially operated with the Fairey Albacore. During the height of the Second World War, it transitioned to operating the Fairey Barracuda. The squadron was reformed twice: firstly from 21 November 1955 – 10 December 1957 and then from 1 May 1958 – 26 August 1966. It briefly utilised the Westland Wyvern as a strike squadron before shifting its focus to electronic warfare. In this capacity, it operated the Grumman Avenger, de Havilland Sea Venom, and Fairey Gannet for electronic countermeasures, alongside the de Havilland Sea Vampire and Percival Sea Prince for training purposes.

The cartoon character Flook was adopted as a squadron mascot in the era following World War 2 and painted as nose art on aircraft.

== History ==
=== World War II (1941–1944) ===
831 Naval Air Squadron was established as a Torpedo Spotter Reconnaissance (TSR) squadron on 1 April 1941, at RNAS Crail (HMS Jackdaw), Fife, with twelve Fairey Albacore torpedo bombers. It relocated to RNAS Machrihanish (HMS Landrail), Argyll and Bute, in August and subsequently boarded the Illustrious-class aircraft carrier HMS Indomitable in October for deployment to Jamaica. Following a period at the RN Air Section at US Naval Air Station Norfolk, Virginia, the squadron re-boarded for the journey to Cape Town, reaching its destination by the end of December 1941.

In January 1942, the journey continued to Port Sudan and subsequently across the Indian Ocean to Java to with the carrier tasked to transport 50 RAF Hawker Hurricane fighter aircraft. Throughout this duration, as well as during the later trip to Aden via Colombo and Addu Atoll, 831 conducted anti-submarine patrols; however, no sightings were made.

After spending three weeks on land conducting coastal patrols from late February to early March 1942 at Khormaksar, the RAF station located in Aden, the squadron re-embarked for the invasion of Madagascar in early June 1942. They participated in dive-bombing missions and anti-submarine patrols. HMS Indomitable then sailed to Gibraltar, passing by the Cape, and sustained significant damage from an aerial attack during Operation Pedestal, which was the Malta convoy in August 1942. However, it successfully returned its squadrons to the United Kingdom before proceeding to the United States for repairs.

At this point, the squadron was diminished to nine aircraft, but its capabilities were enhanced by a limited number of Fairey Barracuda Mk Is, a British carrier-borne torpedo and dive bomber. Following a period stationed at RNAS Crail, RNAS Lee-on-Solent, (HMS Daedalus), Hampshire, RNAS Hatston (HMS Sparrowhawk), Mainland, Orkney, and RNAS Machrihanish, 831 re-boarded HMS Indomitable in March 1943, but subsequently returned to RNAS Lee-on-Solent in May 1943 to upgrade to Fairey Barracuda Mk IIs, becoming part of the 52nd Naval TBR Wing in November 1943 and completed deck landing training on the Illustrious-class aircraft carrier HMS Victorious in February 1944.

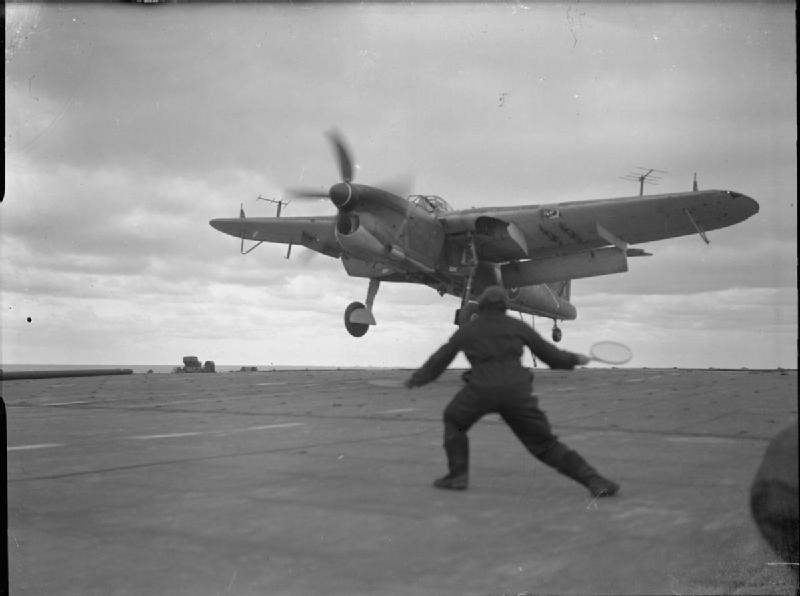
A Fairey Barracuda of 831 Squadron about to land on HMS Furious

The subsequent month, it embarked in HMS Furious to launch an assault on the German battleship Tirpitz on 3 April, during which the Wing achieved multiple hits inflicting severe damage. In May, it re-joined HMS Victorious for another offensive; however, adverse weather conditions disrupted the operation. Later that month, the Wing executed strikes against maritime targets off the coast of Norway.

The squadron made its return to the Far East on the aircraft carrier and on 7 September, incorporated 829 Squadron, thereby augmenting its strength to twenty-one aircraft, which effectively led to the disbandment of the TBR Wing. The expanded squadron conducted attacks on coastal installations and oil storage facilities located in Sabang Harbour on Sumatra, as well as on adjacent airfields. A comparable raid was conducted in August at Emmahaven, located near Padang.

Nonetheless, these operations, along with others, revealed the constraints of the Barracuda aircraft, leading to the decision to retire the aircraft and substitute it with Grumman Avengers, an American carrier-borne torpedo bomber. The squadron relinquished its aircraft and made its way back home on HMS Battler and HMS Thane, ultimately disbanding at RNAS Lee-on-Solent on 6 December 1944.

=== Torpedo strike squadron (1955–1957) ===
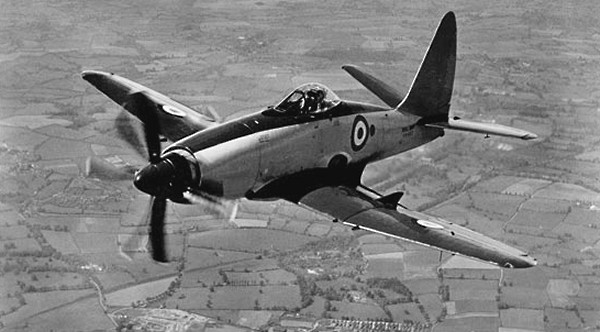
Westland Wyvern S.4; an example of the type used by 831 Squadron

On 21 November 1955, 831 was reformed at RNAS Ford (HMS Peregrine) in West Sussex, designated as a torpedo strike squadron equipped with nine Wyvern S.4, a carrier-based multi-role strike aircraft.

Seven years passed from the maiden flight of the Westland Wyvern to the establishment of the first operational squadron. Three consecutive power plants were entirely new and untested engines. The initial Wyvern to achieve operational status was the S.4, which made its first flight in May 1951 and included a cut-back engine cowling to facilitate cartridge starting, a reinforced cockpit canopy, altered aileron tabs, and auxiliary tail fins on a dihedral tailplane.

It was not until January 1957 that these aircraft were embarked on the Audacious-class aircraft carrier HMS Ark Royal for a short visit to Gibraltar and Malta.

In May, they re-embarked for a Royal Review in the Moray Firth, after which the ship set sail for America, where they engaged in cross-operations and exercises alongside USS Saratoga, returning home in July. Following two additional periods of deployment in Home waters, the squadron was disbanded at RNAS Ford on 10 December.

=== Electronic Warfare squadron (1958–1966) ===
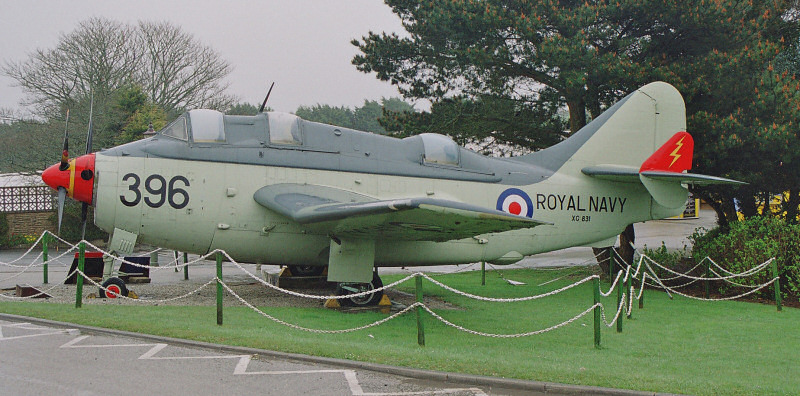
Fairey Gannet ECM.6, seen in 831 Squadron markings

831 Naval Air Squadron was re-established at RNAS Culdrose (HMS Seahawk), located in Cornwall, on 1 May 1958, as an Electronic Warfare squadron, through the renumbering of 751 Naval Air Squadron. Initially, it operated with four Grumman Avenger ECM.6s and four de Havilland Sea Venom ECM.21s, assigned to 'A' and 'B' Flights, respectively. These aircraft took part in various exercises, occasionally embarking on Fleet carriers. In February 1959, 'A' Flight began the transition from Avengers to Fairey Gannet ECM.6s, while 'B' Flight started re-equipping with five Sea Venom ECM.22s from April 1960, although ECM.21s remained in service until 1964.

In 1960, the squadron was honored with the Boyd Trophy award for its training efficiency with the Fleet. A Percival Sea Prince was incorporated into the squadron in 1962, and in July 1963, the squadron headquarters relocated to RAF Watton, Norfolk, to enhance collaboration with its RAF counterpart. On 16 May 1966, the remaining personnel were transferred to the joint RN/RAF 360 Squadron for trials and training in ECM operations, leading to the official disbandment of 831 on 26 August.

=== ScanEagle (2014) ===
831 Flight was established at RNAS Culdrose, in January 2014 to address an urgent operational requirement, enhancing capabilities to support units involved in Operation Kipion in the Persian Gulf and Arabian regions. It was equipped with Boeing Insitu ScanEagle, a small, long-endurance, low-altitude unmanned surveillance and reconnaissance aerial vehicle, for deployments on Royal Navy warships and Royal Air Force units. In October, 831 Flight transitioned to become 700X Squadron.

== Aircraft operated ==
The squadron operated a variety of different aircraft and versions:

- Fairey Albacore torpedo bomber (April 1941 – June 1943)
- Fairey Swordfish I torpedo bomber (January – May 1942)
- Fairey Barracuda Mk I torpedo and dive bomber (December 1942 – January 1943)
- Fairey Barracuda Mk II torpedo and dive bomber (June 1943 – November 1944)
- Westland Wyvern S.4 multi-role strike aircraft (November 1955 – December 1957)
- Grumman Avenger ECM.6 electronic countermeasures aircraft (May 1958 – November 1960)
- de Havilland Sea Venom ECM.21 electronic countermeasures aircraft (May 1958 – October 1964)
- de Havilland Sea Vampire T.22 jet trainer (July 1958 – May 1959, July 1963 – August 1966)
- Fairey Gannet ECM.4 electronic countermeasures aircraft (February 1959 – February 1961)
- de Havilland Sea Venom ECM.22 electronic countermeasures aircraft (April 1960 – May 1966)
- Fairey Gannet ECM.6 electronic countermeasures aircraft (February 1961 – May 1966)
- Percival Sea Prince T.1 navigation and anti-submarine training aircraft (May 1962 – May 1966)
- Boeing Insitu ScanEagle RM.1 (January – September 2014)

== Battle honours ==
The following Battle Honours have been awarded to 831 Naval Air Squadron:

- Diego Suarez 1942
- Malta Convoys 1942
- Norway 1944
- Sabang 1944
- East Indies 1944

== Assignments ==
831 Naval Air Squadron was assigned as needed to form part of a number of larger units:

- 52nd Naval TBR Wing (26 November 1943 – 10 July 1944)

== Naval air stations and aircraft carriers ==
831 Naval Air Squadron was active at various naval air stations of the Royal Navy and Royal Air Force stations, both within the United Kingdom and internationally. Additionally, it operated from several Royal Navy fleet and escort carriers, as well as other airbases located abroad.

=== World War Two air stations and aircraft carriers ===
List of air stations and aircraft carriers used by 831 Naval Air Squadron during World War two including dates:

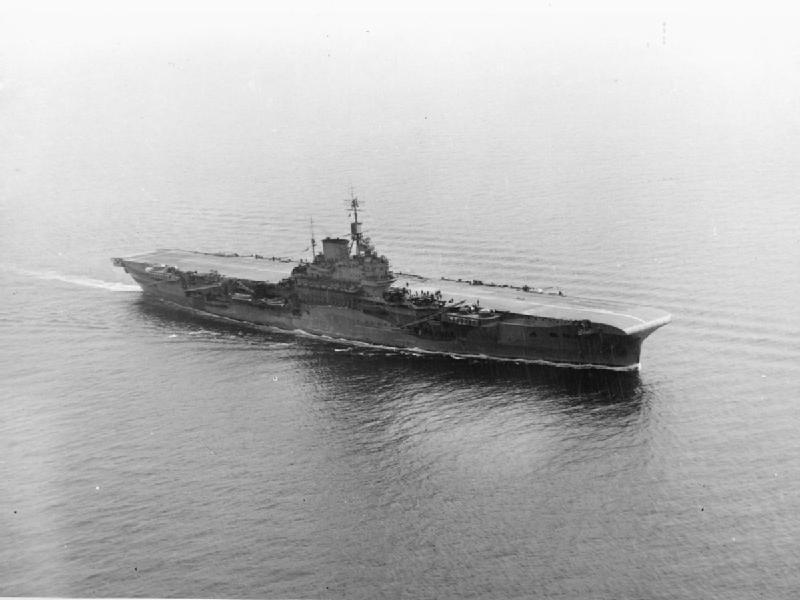
HMS Indomitable

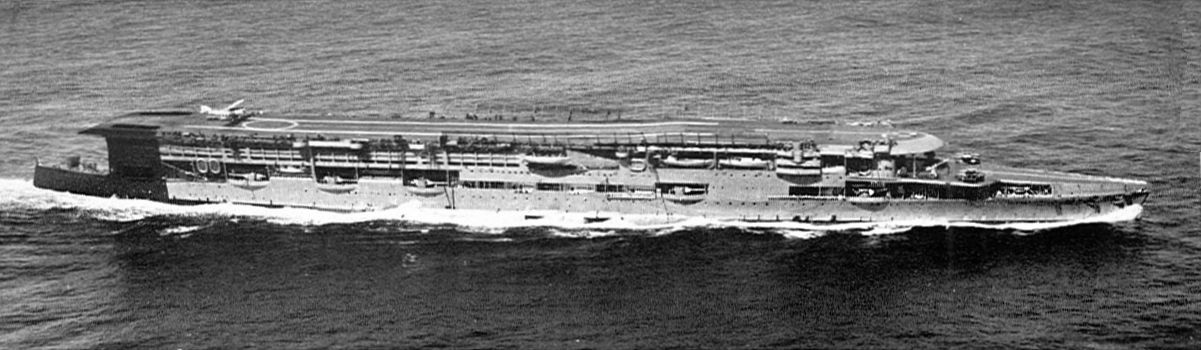
HMS Furious

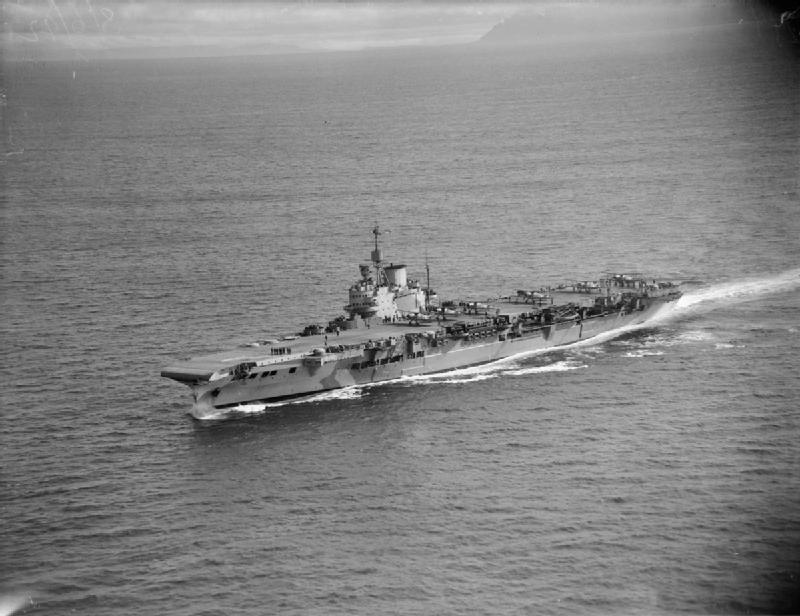
HMS Victorious

- Royal Naval Air Station Crail (HMS Jackdaw), Fife, (1 April – 26 August 1941)
- Royal Naval Air Station Machrihanish (HMS Landrail), Argyll and Bute, (26 August – 15 October 1941)
- HMS Indomitable (15 October – 10 November 1941)
- RN Air Section Norfolk, Virginia, (10 – 22 November 1941)
- HMS Indomitable (22 November 1941 – 2 February 1942)
  - RN Air Section Wynberg, South Africa, (Detachment 31 December 1941 – 2 January 1942)
- RN Air Section China Bay, Ceylon, (2 – 5 February 1942)
- RN Air Section Ratmalana, Ceylon, (5 – 6 February 1942)
- RN Air Section China Bay, Ceylon, (6 – 10 February 1942)
- RN Air Section Ratmalana, Ceylon, (10 – 11 February 1942)
- RN Air Section China Bay, Ceylon, (11 – 16 February 1942)
- HMS Indomitable (16 – 23 February 1942)
- Royal Air Force Khormaksar, Yemen, (23 February – 16 March 1942)
- HMS Indomitable (16 March – 13 April 1942)
- RN Air Section Juhu, India, (13 – 20 April 1942)
- HMS Indomitable (20 April – 25 May 1942)
- RN Air Section Port Reitz, Kenya, (25 May – 6 June 1942)
- HMS Indomitable (6 – 23 June 1942)
- Royal Naval Air Station Mackinnon Road, Kenya, (23 June – 9 July 1942)
- HMS Indomitable (9 July – 27 August 1942)
- Royal Naval Air Station Crail (HMS Jackdaw), Fife, (27 August – 27 December 1942)
- Royal Naval Air Station Lee-on-Solent (HMS Daedalus), Hampshire, (27 December 1942 – 1 January 1943)
- Royal Naval Air Station Hatston (HMS Sparrowhawk), Mainland, Orkney, (1 January – 22 February 1943)
- Royal Naval Air Station Machrihanish (HMS Landrail), Mainland, Orkney, (22 February – 3 March 1943)
- HMS Indomitable (3 March – 17 May 1943)
- Royal Naval Air Station Lee-on-Solent (HMS Daedalus), Hanpshire, (17 May – 9 August 1943)
- Royal Naval Air Station Machrihanish (HMS Landrail), Argyll and Bute, (9 August – 23 October 1943)
- Royal Naval Air Station Maydown, County Londonderry, (23 October – 6 November 1943)
- Royal Naval Air Station Machrihanish (HMS Landrail), Argyll and Bute, (6 November 1943 – 11 January 1944)
- Royal Naval Air Station Hatston (HMS Sparrowhawk), Mainland, Orkney, (11 January – 11 February 1944)
- Royal Naval Air Station Machrihanish (HMS Landrail), Argyll and Bute, (11 February – 8 March 1944)
  - HMS Victorious (Deck Landing Training (DLT) 12 – 15 February 1944)
- HMS Furious (8 March – 8 April 1944)
- Royal Naval Air Station Hatston (HMS Sparrowhawk), Mainland, Orkney, (8 – 20 April 1944)
- HMS Furious (20 April – 3 May 1944)
- Royal Naval Air Station Hatston (HMS Sparrowhawk), Mainland, Orkney, (3 – 11 May 1944)
- HMS Victorious (11 – 20 May 1944)
- Royal Naval Air Station Burscough (HMS Ringtail), Lancashire, (20 – 27 May 1944)
- Royal Naval Air Station Hatston (HMS Sparrowhawk), Mainland, Orkney, (27 May 1944)
- HMS Victorious (9 June – 7 July 1944)
- Royal Naval Air Station Katukurunda (HMS Ukussa), Ceylon, (7 – 19 July 1944)
- HMS Victorious (19 – 27 July 1944)
- RN Air Section Minneriya, Ceylon, (27 July – 10 August 1944)
- HMS Victorious (10 – 28 August 1944)
- Royal Naval Air Station Katukurunda (HMS Ukussa), Ceylon, (28 August – 10 October 1944)
- RN Air Section Minneriya, Ceylon, (10 – 31 October 1944)
- Royal Naval Air Station Coimbatore (HMS Garuda), Celyon, (aircraft) (31 October 1944 – 7/22 November 1944)
- HMS Battler (crews) (7 November – 6 December 1944)
- HMS Thane (crews) (22 November – 6 December 1944)
- Royal Naval Air Station Lee-on-Solent (HMS Daedalus), Hampshire, disbanded – (6 December 1944)

=== Torpedo strike squadron ===
831 Squadron was based at RNAS Ford between 1955 and 1957 during which there were numerous carrier deployments and visits to other airbases.

Home station

- Royal Naval Air Station Ford (HMS Peregrine), Sussex, (21 November 1955 – 10 December 1957)
- Royal Naval Air Station Ford (HMS Peregrine), Sussex, (crews) (27 November – 10 December 1957)
- disbanded – (10 December 1957)

Deployments

- HMS Eagle (Deck Landing Training (DLT) 16 – 18 April 1956)
- Royal Naval Air Station Lossiemouth (HMS Fulmar), Moray, (18 June – 8 July 1956)
- Royal Naval Air Station Lossiemouth (HMS Fulmar), Moray, (6 – 26 October 1956)
- HMS Ark Royal (9 January – 25 February 1957)
  - Royal Naval Air Station Hal Far (HMS Falcon), Malta, (Detachment five aircraft 24 January – 5 February 1957)
- HMS Ark Royal (3 May – 18 July 1957)
- HMS Ark Royal (28 August – 2 September 1957)
- Royal Naval Air Station Culdrose (HMS Seahawk), Cornwall, (28 October – 2 November 1957)
- HMS Ark Royal (13 – 25 November 1957)
- Royal Naval Air Station Lossiemouth (HMS Fulmar), Moray, (aircraft) (25 November 1957)

=== Electronic Warfare squadron ===
831 Squadron operated from RNAS Culdrose between 1958 and 1963 before relocating to RAF Watton, functioning as 'A' and 'B' Flights starting from October 1960.

Home station

- Royal Naval Air Squadron Culdrose (HMS Seahawk) (1 May 1958 – 26 July 1963)
- Royal Air Force Watton (26 July 1963 – 16 May 1966)
- disbanded – (16 May 1966)

Detachments

- HMS Eagle (Detachment 22 May – 4 July 1958)
- Royal Naval Air Squadron Hal Far (HMS Falcon) (Detachment 4 July – 6 November 1958)
- Royal Air Force Watton (Detachment 15 – 20 October 1958)
- Royal Naval Air Squadron Hal Far (HMS Falcon) (Detachment 4 July – 6 November 1958)
- Royal Naval Air Squadron Abbotsinch (HMS Sanderling) (Detachment two aircraft 4 – 11 May 1959)
- Royal Naval Air Squadron Lossiemouth (HMS Fulmar) (Detachment 25 May – 8 June 1959)
- Sola Air Station (Detachment 8 – 12 June 1959)
- El Adem (Detachment 17 – 27 June 1959)
- Royal Naval Air Squadron Hal Far (HMS Falcon) (Detachment 4 July – 6 November 1958)
- Andøya Air Station (Detachment two aircraft 21 – 24 September 1959)
- HMS Victorious (Detachment 15 September – 2 October 1959/30 October – 14 December 1959)
- Royal Naval Air Squadron Hal Far (HMS Falcon) (Detachment 4 November – 2 December 1959)
- Toulon–Hyères Airport (Detachment 2 – 8 December 1959)
- HMS Victorious (Detachment two aircraft 27 January – 22 February 1960)
- Royal Naval Air Squadron Hal Far (HMS Falcon) (Detachment 29 February – 7 April 1960)
- Royal Air Force North Front (Detachment two aircraft 14 – 29 March 1960)
- Royal Naval Air Station Hal Far (HMS Falcon) (Detachment two aircraft 2 – 13 May 1960)
- Valkenburg Naval Air Base (Detachment four aircraft 18 – 23 May 1960)
- Royal Naval Air Station Hal Far (HMS Falcon) (Detachment two/four aircraft 14 June – 4 July 1960)
- Decimomannu Air Base (Detachment two aircraft 15 – 17 June 1960
- Royal Naval Air Station Lossiemouth (HMS Fulmar) (Detachment four aircraft 26 August – 2 September 1960)
- Bodø Main Air Station (Detachment five aircraft 23 September – 3 October 1960)

831 'A' Flight (Fairey Gannet)

- Royal Naval Air Station Culdrose (HMS Seahawk) (October 1960 – 26 July 1963)
  - Valkenburg Naval Air Base (Detachment two aircraft 19 – 20 October 1960)
- HMS Ark Royal (26 – 30 October 1960)
- Royal Naval Air Station Culdrose (HMS Seahawk) (30 October – 27 November 1960)
- HMS Ark Royal (27 November – 2 December 1960)
- Royal Naval Air Station Hal Far (HMS Falcon) (2 – 14 December 1960)
- Royal Naval Air Station Culdrose (HMS Seahawk) (14 December 1960
  - Royal Naval Air Station Hal Far (HMS Falcon) (Detachment two aircraft 17 December 1960 – 10 February 1961/28 April – 19 May 1961)
    - HMS Centaur (Deck Landing Practice (DLP) 15 May 1961)
  - Royal Naval Air Station Lossiemouth (Detachment two aircraft 7 – 14 June 1961)
  - HMS Hermes (Detachment four aircraft 14 – 20 June 1961)
  - Royal Naval Air Station Hal Far (HMS Falcon) (Detachment two aircraft 29 June – 14 July 1961/24August – 26 September 1961)
  - Royal Naval Air Station Lossiemouth (HMS Fulmar) (Detachment 13 – 27 October 1961)
  - Royal Naval Air Station Hal Far (HMS Falcon) (Detachment two aircraft 27 November – 13 December 1961)
  - Royal Air Force North Front (Detachment two aircraft 8 March – 2 April 1962)
  - HMS Ark Royal (Detachment two/one aircraft 10 March – 14 December 1962)
  - Royal Air Force Seletar (12 – 24 April 1962/13 – 28 September 1962)
  - Royal Naval Air Station Hal Far (HMS Falcon) (Detachment one aircraft 1 – 7 May 1962)
  - Royal Naval Air Station Lossiemouth (HMS Fulmar) (Detachment three aircraft 13 – 25 June 1962)
  - Sola Air Station (Detachment three aircraft 25 – 28 June 1962)
  - Royal Naval Air Station Hal Far (HMS Falcon) (Detachment two aircraft 13 – 20 Jule 1962/13 – 25 September 1962)
  - Orange (Detachment two aircraft 25 September – 3 October 1962)
  - Royal Naval Air Station Ballykelly (HMS Sealion) (Detachment two aircraft 22 November 1962, fatal crash both aircraft 27 November 1962)
  - Royal Naval Air Station Ballykelly (HMS Sealion) (Detachment two aircraft 14 – 22 January 1963)
  - Lann-Bihoue (Detachment two aircraft 21 February – 8 March 1963)
  - Royal Naval Air Station Ballykelly (HMS Sealion) (Detachment two aircraft 26 March – 2 April 1963)
  - Royal Naval Air Station Ballykelly (HMS Sealion) (Detachment two aircraft 11 – 13 June 1963)
- Royal Air Force Watton (26 July 1963 – 16 May 1966)
  - Royal Naval Air Station Lossiemouth (HMS Fulmar) (Detachment two aircraft 4 – 25 October 1963)
  - Royal Naval Air Station Culdrose (Detachment two aircraft 17 – 30 January 1964)
  - Royal Air Force North Front (Detachment three aircraft 20 February – 10 March 1964)
  - Sola Air Station (Detachment two aircraft 24 April – 4 May 1964)
  - Royal Naval Air Station Hal Far (HMS Falcon) (Detachment two aircraft 9 – 22 July 1964)
  - Royal Naval Air Station Lossiemouth (HMS Fulmar) (Detachment two aircraft 17 – 21 September 1964)
  - Royal Naval Air Station Brawdy (HMS Goldcrest) (Detachment two aircraft 16 – 19 November 1964)
  - Royal Naval Air Station Lossiemouth (HMS Fulmar) (Detachment three aircraft 20 February – 6 March 1965)
  - Royal Air Force Akrotiri (Detachment three aircraft 5 – 15 June 1965)
  - Royal Naval Air Station Hal Far (Detachment three aircraft 19 – 26 July 1965)
  - Rygge (Detachment three aircraft 7 – 10 September 1965)
  - Royal Naval Air Station Lossiemouth (HMS Fulmar) (Detachment two aircraft 14 – 16 September 1965)
  - Royal Naval Air Station Ballykelly (HMS Sealion) (Detachment two aircraft 20 – 22 September 1965)
  - Royal Naval Air Station Hal Far (HMS Falcon) (Detachment two aircraft 6 – 12 October 1965)
  - Royal Naval Air Station Yeovilton (HMS Heron) (Detachment three aircraft 18 – 21 October 1965)
  - Royal Naval Air Station Ballykelly (HMS Sealion) (Detachment two aircraft 9 – 11 November 1965)
  - Royal Air Force North Front (Detachment three aircraft 10 February – 3 March 1966)
  - Royal Naval Air Station Brawdy (HMS Goldcrest) (Detachment two aircraft 21 – 24 February 1966)
- disbanded – (16 May 1966)

831 'B' Flight (de Havilland Sea Venom)

- Royal Naval Air Station Culdrose (HMS Seahawk) (October – 11 November 1960)
  - Valkenburg Naval Air Base (Detachment two aircraft 19 – 20 October 1960)
- Royal Naval Air Station Hal Far (HMS Falcon) (11 – 27 November 1960)
- HMS Ark Royal (27 November – 2 December 1960)
- Royal Naval Air Station Hal Far (HMS Falcon) (2 – 13 December 1960)
- Royal Naval Air Station Culdrose (HMS Seahawk) (13 December 1960 – 12 May 1961)
- Valkenburg Naval Air Base (12 – 15 May 1961)
- Royal Naval Air Station Culdrose (HMS Seahawk) (15 May – 18 June 1961)
- Sola Air Station (18 – 22 June 1961)
- Royal Naval Air Station Culdrose (HMS Seahawk) (22 June – 13 October 1961)
  - Royal Naval Air Station Hal Far (HMS Falcon) (Detachment two aircraft 24 August – 11 September 1961)
- Royal Naval Air Station Lossiemouth (HMS Fulmar) (13 – 27 October 1961)
- Royal Naval Air Station Culdrose (HMS Seahawk) (27 October 1961 – 8 March 1962)
  - Royal Naval Air Station Hal Far (HMS Falcon) (Detachment two aircraft 24 November – 13 December 1961)
- Royal Air Force North Front (8 March – 2 April 1962)
- Royal Naval Air Station Culdrose (HMS Seahawk) (2 April – 22 November 1962)
  - Royal Naval Air Station Hal Far (HMS Falcon) (Detachment two aircraft 1 – 7 May 1962)
  - Royal Naval Air Station Lossiemouth (HMS Fulmar) (Detachment three aircraft 13 – 25 June 1962)
  - Sola Air Station (Detachment three aircraft 25 – 28 June 1962)
  - Royal Naval Air Station Hal Far (HMS Falcon) (Detachment three aircraft 13 – 20 July 1962)
  - Royal Air Force North Front (Detachment three aircraft 20 – 27 July 1962)
  - Royal Naval Air Station Hal Far (HMS Falcon) (13 – 25 September 1962)
  - Valkenburg Naval Air Base (Detachment three aircraft 29 September – 1 October 1962)
- Royal Naval Air Station Ballykelly (HMS Sealion) (22 – 28 November 1962)
- Royal Naval Air Station Culdrose (HMS Seahawk) (28 November 1962 – 26 July 1963)
  - Royal Naval Air Station Hal Far (HMS Falcon) (Detachment three aircraft 10 January – 1 February 1963)
  - Royal Naval Air Station Ballykelly (HMS Sealion) (Detachment two/one aircraft 14 – 22 January 1963)
  - Lann-Bihoue (Detachment three aircraft 22 February – 8 March 1963)
  - Royal Naval Air Station Ballykelly (HMS Sealion) (Detachment two aircraft 26 March – 2 April 1963/11 – 13 June 1963)
- Royal Air Force Watton (26 July – 7 October 1963)
- Royal Naval Air Station Lossiemouth (7 – 11 October 1963)
- Royal Air Force Watton (11 – 15 October 1963)
- Royal Naval Air Station Lossiemouth (15 – 25 October 1963)
- Royal Air Force Watton (25 October 1963 – 20 May 1965)
  - Royal Naval Air Station Ballykelly (HMS Sealion) (Detachment two aircraft 2 – 3 December 1963)
  - Royal Naval Air Station Culdrose (HMS Seahawk) (Detachment three aircraft 17 – 30 January 1964)
  - Royal Air Force North Front (Detachment three aircraft 21 February – 10 March 1964)
  - Royal Naval Air Station Hal Far (HMS Falcon) (Detachment three aircraft 12 – 19 October 1964)
  - Royal Naval Air Station Brawdy (HMS Goldcrest) (Detachment three aircraft 16 – 19 November 1964)
  - Royal Naval Air Station Lossiemouth (HMS Fulmar) (Detachment two aircraft 20 February – 6 March 1965)
- Valkenburg Naval Air Base (20 May – 3 June 1965)
- Royal Air Force Watton (3 June 1965 – 16 May 1966)
  - Sola Air Station (Detachment three aircraft 2 – 13 May 1966)
- disbanded – (16 May 1966)

== Commanding officers ==
List of commanding officers of 831 Naval Air Squadron with date of appointment:

1941–1944

- Lieutenant Commander P.L. Mortimer, RN, from 1 April 1941
- Lieutenant Commander A.G. Leatham, RN, from 1 July 1942
- Lieutenant F.W.H. Bradley, RCNVR, from 28 December 1942
- Lieutenant Commander(A) D.E.C. Eyres, DSC, RN, from 8 May 1943
- Lieutenant Commander E.M. Britton, RN, from 15 September 1943
- Lieutenant Commander V. Rance, OBE, RN, from 4 January 1944
- Lieutenant Commander(A) D. Brooks, DSC, RNVR, from 13 February 1944
- Lieutenant Commander(A) J.L. Fisher, RNVR, from 6 May 1944
- disbanded – 6 December 1944

1955–1957

- Lieutenant Commander S.C. Farquhar, RN, from 21 November 1955
- disbanded – 10 December 1957

1958–1966

- Lieutenant Commander W.J. Hanks, RN, from 1 May 1958
- Lieutenant Commander B.J. Williams, RN, from 16 July 1959
- Lieutenant Commander D.K. Blair, RN, from 16 May 1961
- Lieutenant Commander J.G. Grindle, RN, from 30 May 1963
- Lieutenant Commander H. Ellis, RN, from 11 June 1965
- disbanded – 16 May 1966

2014

- Lieutenant Commander A. Rogers, RNR, from 20 January 2014
- became 700X Naval Air Squadron – 1 October 2014

Note: Abbreviation (A) signifies Air Branch of the RN or RNVR.
