= List of air stations of the Royal Navy =

This is a list of Royal Navy naval air stations. Naval air stations are Royal Navy (RN) shore establishments which operate to support the Fleet Air Arm (FAA), the branch of the RN responsible for operating the service's naval aircraft.

Historically, the abbreviation RNAS referred to the Royal Naval Air Service, the Royal Navy's aviation branch until 1918. That year, the RNAS merged with the Royal Flying Corps (RFC) of the British Army to form the independent Royal Air Force (RAF). In contemporary usage, RNAS denotes a "Royal Naval Air Station" and, following RAF station‑naming conventions, is paired with the geographical location of the establishment.

Between 1918 and 1939, the RAF provided and operated the FAA in support of the RN, and Royal Naval Air Stations were consequently manned and administered by RAF personnel.

On 24 May 1939, operational control of the FAA returned to the Admiralty under the terms of the Inskip Award. RAF personnel were replaced by, or transferred to, RN service.

As RAF Coastal Command remained part of the RAF, Royal Naval Air Stations have generally supported carrier-based aircraft as shore bases when required since 1939.

== Current naval air stations ==
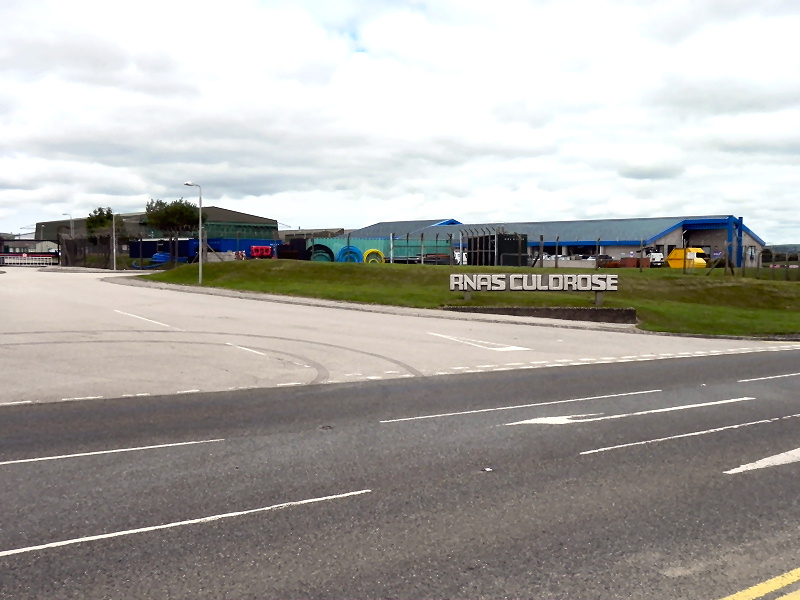
RNAS Culdrose (HMS Seahawk)

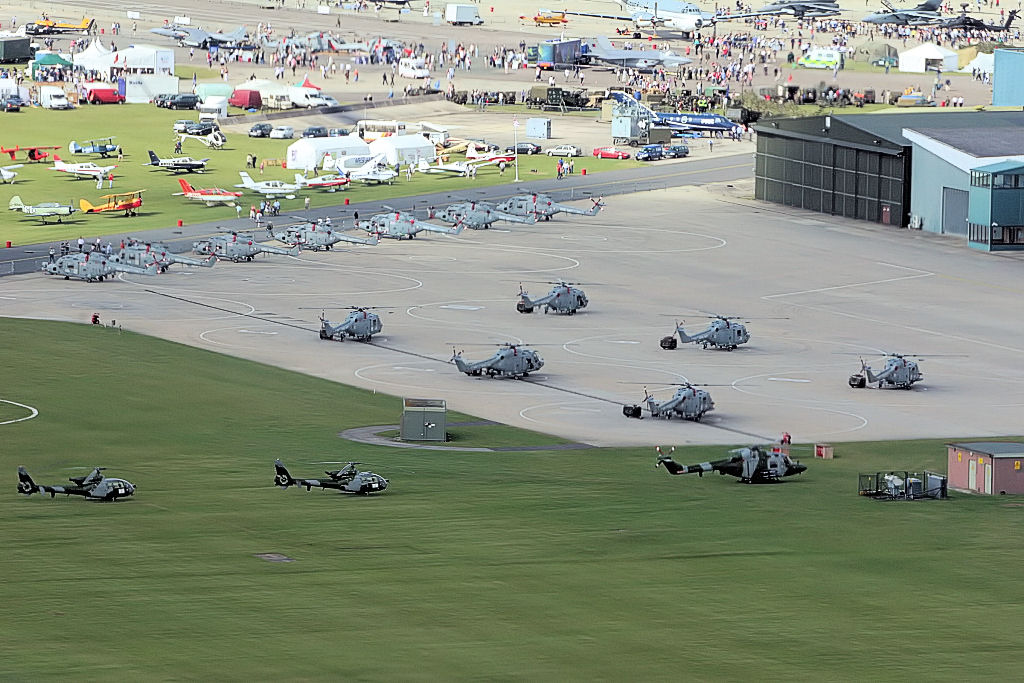
RNAS Yeovilton (HMS Heron)

Front‑line operations of the Fleet Air Arm are primarily conducted from two main naval air stations, RNAS Culdrose and RNAS Yeovilton, each supported by a nearby satellite airfield, Predannack Airfield and RNAS Merryfield respectively.

Fleet Air Arm front‑line units also operate from several additional airbases as required: HMS Gannet, a Royal Navy forward operating base at Glasgow Prestwick Airport and RAF Marham, a Royal Air Force station and is home to F-35B Lightning II operations and also a Fleet Air Arm squadron.

Several former airbases are operated by the defence contractor QinetiQ on behalf of the Ministry of Defence (MoD) for test and evaluation purposes. The principal site is the former RAF station at Boscombe Down in Wiltshire and is home to a Fleet Air Arm unit.

Training for aircrew across all three UK armed services is delivered through the UK Military Flying Training System (UKMFTS), which utilises a couple of Royal Air Force stations both with a Fleet Air Arm presence, at RAF Barkston Heath and at RAF Shawbury.

(Bold denotes Royal Navy shore establishment, italics denotes other controlled airbase with Fleet Air Arm unit)

Main Naval Air Stations and Satellite Airfields
Airbase	Location	Role/Units
**RNAS Culdrose**	Helston, Cornwall, England	Maritime Merlin operations; Royal Naval School of Flight Deck Operations; 750 Naval Air Squadron - Observer and WSO training
**RNAS Yeovilton**	Yeovilton, Somerset, England	Wildcat Maritime Force (WMF); Commando Helicopter Force (CHF); Joint Aviation Command; Wildcat Demo Team; 727 Naval Air Squadron - Flight grading and assessment
**Predannack Airfield** (satellite)	Mullion, Cornwall	Satellite airfield supporting RNAS Culdrose
**RNAS Merryfield** (satellite)	Ilton, Somerset	Satellite airfield supporting RNAS Yeovilton
Front-Line Support Airbases
**HMS Gannet**	Glasgow Prestwick Airport, South Ayrshire, Scotland	Forward Operating Base (FOB) for Merlin HM2 detachments from RNAS Culdrose
RAF Marham	Norfolk, England	Main operating base for the F-35B Lightning II; home to 809 Naval Air Squadron (Fleet Air Arm), part of the RAF's No. 1 Group.
Test and Evaluation Airbase
MOD Boscombe Down	Wiltshire, England	Test and Evaluation airfield operated by QinetiQ; home to 744 Naval Air Squadron as part of the Air and Space Warfare Centre and the **Air Test and Evaluation Centre** (**ATEC**)
UKMFTS Training Airbases
RAF Barkston Heath	Lincolnshire, England	**Defense Elementary Flying Training School**; includes 703 Naval Air Squadron operating the Grob Prefect T1
RAF Shawbury	Shropshire, England	No. 1 Flying Training School; includes 705 Naval Air Squadron flying the Airbus Juno HT1; also home to Central Flying School (Helicopter) Squadron elements and the Defence College of Air and Space Operations

== Map of stations within the UK ==
Map of the United Kingdom showing active naval air stations, including forward operating bases and satellite airfields, Ministry of Defence (MOD) airfields with a Royal Navy presence and Royal Air Force (RAF) stations with a Royal Navy presence.

Operational locations for the Fleet Air Arm within the United Kingdom. The colour of the location mark indicates the type of airbase or unit at each location (blue: Naval Air Station, orange: satellite airfield, yellow: Forward Operating Base, red: FAA Unit at RAF airbase, green: FAA Unit at MoD location)

== Former naval air stations ==
When control of the Fleet Air Arm was transferred from the Royal Air Force, four of its existing airbases, in the United Kingdom, were also transferred to the Fleet Air Arm, these were: Donibristle, Lee-on-Solent, Ford, and Worthy Down. At that time when operating overseas, the Fleet Air Arm still needed to rely on lodger facilities at Royal Air Force stations abroad.

During the early period of the Second World War the Royal Navy worked to acquire its own airfields, both in the UK and near to strategic bases abroad. Some of these were purpose built and others were transferred over from the Royal Air Force.

These lists covers Fleet Air Arm establishments, located both on the British Isles and overseas. It includes Air Stations, Air Sections, Air Maintenance & Repair Yards, Lodger units at RAF bases, and training establishments. The bases are listed alphabetically, by geographical location.

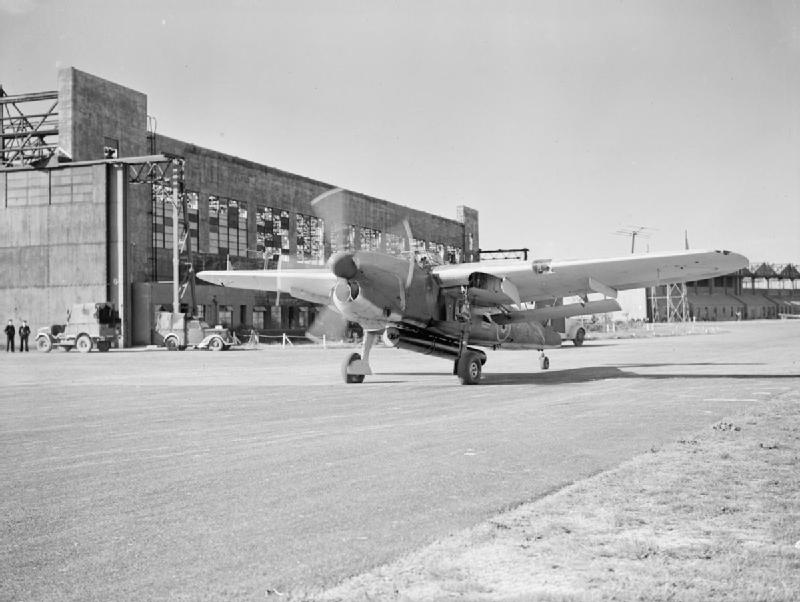
A loaded Fairey Barracuda torpedo bomber taxi-ing at RNAS Lee-on-Solent (HMS Daedalus)

Key to the types of establishments:

- BCAS - British Commonwealth Air Station
- MONAB - Mobile Naval Air Base
- RAF - Royal Air Force
- RAAF - Royal Australian Air Force
- RCAF - Royal Canadian Air Force
- RNAS - Royal Naval Air Station
- RNAY - Royal Naval Air Yard
- RNAMY - Royal Naval Aircraft Maintenance Yard
- RNARY - Royal Naval Aircraft Repair Yard
- RNADC - Royal Naval Aircraft Direction Centre
- RNAE - Royal Naval Air Establishment
- RNATE - Royal Naval Aircraft Training Establishment
- RNTE - Royal Naval Training Establishment
- SAAF - South African Air Force
- TAMY - Transportable Aircraft Maintenance Yard
- USAF - United States Air Force
- USNAS - United States Naval Air Station
- USNAF - United States Naval Air Facility

=== British Isles ===
This list is of former air stations of the Royal Navy within the British Isles, consisting of the islands of Great Britain, Ireland, the Isle of Man, the Inner and Outer Hebrides, the Northern Isles (Orkney and Shetland), and over six thousand smaller islands. The Channel Islands, off the north coast of France, are normally taken to be part of the British Isles. The list includes airbases wholly operated by the Admiralty and those where RN lodger units operated, sometimes under a RN Air Section.

The Royal Navy initiated actions to secure its own airfields, both within the UK and in proximity to key overseas bases; some of these airfields were to be constructed specifically for this purpose, while others were to be acquired from the RAF. The compilation is divided into two sections; the initial section addresses airfields that were either owned by the Admiralty from their inception or RAF stations that were completely handed over to the Admiralty. The subsequent section addresses RAF stations that were provided with lodger facilities and/or where a Royal Navy Air Section was operational.

Royal Naval Air Stations within the British Isles, including name, commission and Royal Air Force name where applicable
Name	Ship's name	RAF Station	RN Years active	Current county	Country	Notes
RNAS Abbotsinch	HMS Sanderling	RAF Abbotsinch	1943–1963	Renfrewshire	Scotland	Lodger facilities for an RN Air Section from June 1940. Transferred from No. 19 Group RAF to the Admiralty in August 1943. Now Glasgow Airport
RNAS Angle	HMS Goldcrest	RAF Angle	1943	Pembrokeshire	Wales	Transferred from No. 19 Group RAF on 1 May 1943. Returned to RAF control on 5 September 1943.
RNAS Anglesey	n/a	RAF Mona	1915–1918	Anglesey	Wales	Airship station
RNAS Anthorn	HMS Nuthatch	RAF Anthorn	1944–58	Cumbria	England	Land requisitioned by the Admiralty and air station purpose-built. Now Anthorn Radio Station
RNAS Arbroath	HMS Condor	n/a	1940–1971	Angus	Scotland	Designed and constructed specifically for the Admiralty. Now RM Condor
RNAS Ayr	HMS Wagtail	RAF Heathfield; RAF Ayr	1944–46	South Ayrshire	Scotland	Transferred on loan from No. 13 Group RAF on 6 September 1944
RNAS Bacton	n/a	RAF Bacton	1915–19	Norfolk	England	
RNAS Ballyhalbert	HMS Corncrake	RAF Ballyhalbert	1945	County Down	Northern Ireland	Lodger facilities provided by RAF Northern Ireland from 1942. Airbase transferred from RAF Northern Ireland on a loan basis on 14 July 1945. Returned to RAF Northern Ireland on 24 January 1946.
RNAS Ballykelly	HMS Sealion	RAF Ballykelly	1962–1971	County Londonderry	Northern Ireland	RAF station hosting Joint Ant-Submarine School from 1947, RN having lodger status. Joint RAF-RN station from 1962. Now Shackleton Barracks
RNAS Beccles	HMS Hornbill II	RAF Beccles	1945-53	Suffolk	England	Lodger facilities from No. 16 Group RAF. Transferred on loan to the Admiralty in July 1945
RNAS Belfast	HMS Gadwall; HMS Gannet III	RAF Sydenham	1943–1973	County Antrim	Northern Ireland	Lodger facilities at RAF Sydenham, transferred to the Admiralty in June 1943. Also home to Royal Navy Aircraft Maintenance Yard Belfast. Returned to the RAF on 2 July 1973. Now George Best Belfast City Airport
RNAS Bramcote	HMS Gamecock	RAF Bramcote	1946–58	Warwickshire	England	Transferred from No. 4 Group RAF to the Admiralty on 1 December 1946. Transferred to the British Army on 10 November 1958. Now Gamecock Barracks
n/a	n/a	RAF Bratton	1943–44	Shropshire	England	Temporarily provided under an agreement with the Air Ministry starting in April 1944. The Relief Landing Ground served as a supplementary site to RNAS Hinstock for Instrument Flying Training.
RNAS Brawdy	HMS Goldcrest; HMS Goldcrest II	RAF Brawdy	1946–1971	Pembrokeshire	Wales	Re-allocated from the Air Ministry to the Admiralty on 1 January 1946. Subsequently transferred to RAF oversight on 1 March 1971. Now Cawdor Barracks
RNAS Bungay	HMS Europa II	RAF Bungay; RAF Flixton	1945–46	Suffolk	England	Former USAAF airfield, transferred from the Air Ministry on loan in September 1945. Returned to the Air Ministry on 31 May 1946
RNAS Burscough	HMS Ringtail	n/a	1943–46	Lancashire	England	Closed in May 1946, transferred to the Admiralty Dockyards department on 5 May 1955
RNAS Bush Barn	n/a	RAF Bush Barn; No. 44 SLG	1944–45	Oxfordshire	England	Transferred from the Ministry of Aircraft Production on loan July 1944. On the books of Kestrel.
RNAS Calshot	n/a	RAF Calshot	1913–22	Hampshire	England	
RNAS Campbeltown	HMS Landrail; HMS Landrail II	n/a	1940–45	Argyll & Bute	Scotland	Civilian airfield requisitioned by the Admiralty in April 1940 (located 1 mile (2 km) south east of RNAS Machrihanish, grass landing ground north of the B843).
RNAS Capel	n/a	RAF Folkestone	1915–19	Kent	England	
RNAS Cattewater	n/a	RAF Cattewater; RAF Mount Batten	1917–18	Devon	England	
RNAS Charlton Horethorne	HMS Heron II	RAF Charlton Horethorne	1942–45	Somerset	England	Lodger facility established at the RAF station in July 1942. It was subsequently transferred to the Admiralty on loan as of 1 January 1943. The facility was returned to RAF oversight in April 1945, in exchange for RAF Zeals.
RNAS Chingford	n/a	RAF Chingford	1915–19	Greater London	England	Now William Girling Reservoir
n/a	Raven	Christchurch	?-1945	Dorset	England	Lodger facilities with a Naval Air Section and the Naval Air Radio Installation Unit.
n/a (Station in Reserve)	n/a	RAF Cluntoe	1947-mid 1950s	County Tyrone	Northern Ireland	Used occasionally.
RNAS Covehithe	n/a	RAF Covehithe	1915–19	Suffolk	England	
RNAS Cowdray Park	n/a	n/a	1941–45	West Sussex	England	Private airfield requisitioned for the storage of obsolescent naval aircraft.
RNAS Crail	HMS Jackdaw; HMS Bruce	RAF Crail	1940–1961	Fife	Scotland	
RNAS Culham	HMS Hornbill	n/a	1944–1953	Oxfordshire	England	Now Culham Science Centre
RNAS Dale	HMS Goldcrest	RAF Dale	1943–48	Pembrokeshire	Wales	Transferred from No. 19 Group RAF on 5 September 1943; commission subsequently moved from RNAS Angle.
RNAS Donibristle	HMS Merlin	RAF Donibristle	1939–1959	Fife	Scotland	Transferred from the Royal Air Force on 24 May 1939; Parent Station to: RNAS Campbeltown, RNAS Drem, RNAS Evanton, and RNAS Fearn
RNAS Dounreay	Never commissioned	RAF Dounreay	1944–54	Highland	Scotland	Transferred from the Royal Air Force on 15 May 1944. Not commissioned, it was kept on care and maintenance status from 29 September 1945, as HMS Tern III, with accounts managed in Owl. It remained on the books of Fulmar from 30 September 1946 to 1 October 1954. It was transferred to the Air Ministry on 19 January 1954.
RNAS Drem	HMS Nighthawk	RAF Drem	1945–46	East Lothian	Scotland	Lodger facility for a RN Air Section at RAF Station. It was transferred to the Admiralty on an indefinite loan from No. 13 Group RAF on 21 April 1945. On 5 March 1946, it was returned to RAF control.
RNAS Dundee	HMS Condor II	RAF Dundee	1941–44	Dundee City	Scotland	First World War seaplane base retained on care & maintenance basis until reactivated at the start of the Second World War. Seaplane school for Observer training. Satellite to RNAS Arbroath
RNAS Dunino	HMS Jackdaw II	RAF Dunino	1942–46	Fife	Scotland	Transferred from the Royal Air Force on 1 December 1942. In 1946 it was put to care and maintenance. The site remained under the jurisdiction of the Royal Navy until 1957.
RNAS Eastchurch	n/a	RAF Eastchurch	1910–1918	Kent	England	Now HM Prison Standford Hill
RNAS East Fortune	n/a	RAF East Fortune	1915–18	East Lothian	Scotland	National Museum of Flight
RNAS East Haven	HMS Peewit	n/a	1943–46	Angus	Scotland	Specifically designed and constructed for the Admiralty. It served as the home for the Deck Landing Training School.
RNAS Eastleigh	HMS Raven	RAF Eastleigh; RAF Southampton	1917–20, 1935–39, 1939–1947	Hampshire	England	Now Southampton Airport
RNAS Eglinton	HMS Gannet	RAF Eglinton	1943–1959; 1960–63	County Londonderry	Northern Ireland	Transferred on loan from the Royal Air Force on 1 May 1943. Under care and maintenance from 1959. Served as the parent station to RNAS Maydown from 15 May 1943 to 1 January 1944 and once more from 31 September 1945. Now City of Derry Airport
RNAS Evanton	HMS Fieldfare	RAF Evanton; Novar	1944–48	Highland	Scotland	It was transferred from the Royal Air Force on 1 September 1944 and functioned as a Royal Navy Aircraft Maintenance Yard. On 24 March 1948, it was put to care and maintenance
RNAS Fairlop	n/a	RAF Fairlop	1916-18	Essex	England	Playing fields, to north of WW2 RAF Fairlop
RNAS Fearn	HMS Owl	RAF Fearn	1942–46	Highland	Scotland	Transferred from the Royal Air Force on 15 July 1942. On 2 July 1946, it was placed in care and maintenance status on the books of Fulmar with a six-month notice period for potential reactivation.
RNAS Felixstowe	n/a	RAF Felixstowe	1913–19	Suffolk	England	See Seaplane Experimental Station
RNAS Fishguard	n/a		1917–19	Pembrokeshire	Wales	
RNAS Ford	HMS Peregrine	RAF Ford; RAF Ford Junction	1939–40; 1945–58	West Sussex	England	On 24 May 1939, transferred from No. 17 Group RAF to the Admiralty. Subsequently, on 30 October 1940, returned to the RAF, providing lodger facilities for Royal Navy units with a notice period of one month. Furthermore, on 1 August 1945, transferred from No. 11 Group RAF to the Admiralty. The station was officially closed on 15 December 1958. Now HM Prison Ford
RNAS Goldhanger	n/a	RAF Goldhanger	1915–16	Essex	England	Farmland
RNAS Gosport	HMS Siskin	RAF Gosport	1940–56	Hampshire	England	Transferred from No. 16 Group RAF to the control of the Admiralty. On 1 June 1956, it was designated as HMS Sultan Mechanical Training and Repair Establishment.
RNAS Grimsetter	HMS Robin	RAF Grimsetter	1943–45	Orkney	Scotland	RAF station loaned to the Admiralty on 6 July 1943. It served as a satellite facility to RNAS Hatston. Now Kirkwall Airport
RNAS Haldon	HMS Heron II	RAF Haldon	1941–43	Devon	England	Transferred from the Air Ministry. This site served as a relief landing ground and a satellite to RNAS Yeovilton. It was put to care and maintenance in May 1943 and was officially closed on 17 February 1946
RNAS Halesworth	HMS Sparrowhawk	RAF Halesworth	1945–46	Suffolk	England	Lodger facilities from No. 16 Group RAF. It was then transferred on a loan basis from 5 June 1945 until October 1946; however, on 15 March 1946, it was returned to the custody of the RAF.
RNAS Hatston	HMS Sparrowhawk; HMS Tern II		1939–1945	Orkney	Scotland	Designed specifically for the Admiralty. Commissioned on 2 October 1939 as HMS Sparrowhawk, it was decommissioned on 1 August 1945 and subsequently recommissioned as HMS Tern II. It was decommissioned again on 15 September 1945 and placed in care and maintenance
RNAS Henstridge	HMS Dipper	n/a	1943–46; 1949–1954	Somerset	England	Purpose built for the Admiralty, one of only two RNAS to feature five runways, one as a dummy deck landing area equipped with an arrestor system for carrier training purposes. It was decommissioned in 1946, put to care and maintenance with a six-month notice period for potential re-opening. In 1949, it was reactivated as a satellite station to RNAS Yeovilton. However, in 1953, it was downgraded to non-flying status and reverted to care and maintenance, with a three-month notice period for re-opening to serve MONAB 10. Now Henstridge Airfield
RNAS Hinstock	HMS Godwit	RAF Ollerton; No. 21 SLG	1943–47	Shropshire	England	Transferred from the Royal Air Force as the satellite airfield for RNAS Stretton on 13 August 1942. It served as the home for the Central Naval Instrument Flying Training School. It had the temporary utilisation of two airfields associated with Instrument Flying Training: RNAS Weston Park and RAF Bratton.
RNAS Hornsea Mere	n/a	RAF Atwick	?-1918	East Yorkshire	England	
RNAS Inskip	HMS Nightjar	n/a	1943–46	Lancashire	England	Constructed specifically for the Admiralty in June 1942. Closed to aviation activities from February 1946. On 2 July 1946, it was placed to care and maintenance under Blackcap. It was designated as a Royal Navy Radio station on 1 September 1958, and was officially commissioned as HMS Inskip on 21 March 1966.
RNAS Jersey	n/a	RAF St Helier	1940	Jersey	Channel Islands	Civilian airport was requisitioned by the Admiralty in March 1940, accounts under Kestrel. On 31 May 1940, naval personnel were evacuated. Jersey Airport
RNAS Kingsnorth	n/a	RAF Kingsnorth (WWI)	1914–25	Kent	England	WWI airship station on the Isle of Grain on the south bank of the River Thames
RNAS Kirkistown	HMS Corncrake II	RAF Kirkistown	1945–46	County Down	Northern Ireland	Lodger facilities for Royal Navy squadrons during WWII. It was transferred to the Admiralty from RAF Northern Ireland on a loan basis on 14 July 1945 as a satellite airfield. Returned to RAF Northern Ireland on 15 January 1946.
RNAS Lawrenny Ferry	HMS Daedalus II	n/a	1942–43	Pembrokeshire	Wales	The Admiralty requisitioned the riverbank slipway for the purpose of conducting Seaplane Flying Training Part II. It was opened in May 1941, put to Care and Maintenance status in 1943, and ultimately closed in late 1945.
RNAS Lee-on-Solent	HMS Daedalus; HMS Ariel	RAF Lee-on-Solent	1939–1995	Hampshire	England	Transferred from the Air Ministry to the Admiralty on 24 May 1939. Commissioned as HMS Daedalus. Parent to: RNAE Bedhampton Camp, RNATE Lympne, RNATE Newcastle-under-Lyme, RNAS Lawrenny Ferry, and RNAS Sandbanks. Served as the home of the Air Electrical School and was commissioned as HMS Ariel from 1959 to 1965. Ceased operations in 1996. Currently known as Solent Airport Daedalus.
RNAS Limavady	n/a	RAF Limavady	1944; 1945–?	County Londonderry	Northern Ireland	Lodger facilities provided by No. 15 Group RAF in 1944. On 1 December 1945, it was loaned to the Admiralty. Also utilised for a short period for ADDLs during the Korean War by part of the Operational Flying Training School at RNAS Eglinton.
RNAS Lossiemouth	HMS Fulmar	RAF Lossiemouth	1946–1972	Moray	Scotland	Loaned from No. 18 Group RAF. Commissioned on 12 July 1946, it was decommissioned on 22 September 1972 and subsequently returned to RAF oversight. Lodger facilities remained after its return to the RAF until 9 February 1979. Now RAF Lossiemouth
RNAS Ludham	HMS Flycatcher	RAF Ludham	1944–?	Norfolk	England	Transferred from No. 12 Group RAF on 24 August 1944. HQ Mobile Naval Airfield Organisation, MONAB assembly station with facilities for 2 x MONABs. Ceased operations on 16 February 1945, with the commission being transferred to RNAS Middle Wallop.
RNAS Lympne	HMS Buzzard; HMS Daedalus II	RAF Lympne	1939–1940	Kent	England	Transferred from No. 22 Group RAF. Opened on 1 July 1939, Buzzard - Support of disembarked squadrons, Daedalus II - Technical training of Air Apprentices and Air Fitters. Closed on 23 May 1940 and returned to No. 11 Group RAF control
RNAS Machrihanish	HMS Landrail	RAF Machrihanish	1941–46; 1951–52	Argyll & Bute	Scotland	A Naval Air Station purpose built on the grounds of a previous Royal Naval Air Service station from the First World War. It was handed over to the RAF and subsequently evolved into a NATO base. Now Campbeltown Airport
RNAS Macmerry	HMS Nighthawk II	RAF Macmerry	1945–46	East Lothian	Scotland	
RNAS Maydown	HMS Shrike; HMS Gannet II	RAF Maydown	1943–45	County Londonderry	Northern Ireland	Transferred from the Royal Air Force on 1 May 1943. Commissioned on 1 January 1944, as HMS Shrike, and subsequently recommissioned on 31 September 1945, as HMS Gannet II, serving as a satellite station to RNAS Eglinton. It was home to the Combined Anti-Submarine Tactical School.
RNAS Middle Wallop	HMS Flycatcher	RAF Middle Wallop	1945–46	Hampshire	England	On 16 February 1945 the HQ Mobile Naval Airfield Organisation was relocated from RNAS Ludham to Middle Wallop, with the station being handed over from No. 70 Group RAF to Admiralty control on the same day, and subsequently commissioned as HMS Flycatcher. Was to be handed back to the RAF in April 1946. Now Middle Wallop Flying Station
RNAS Milltown	HMS Fulmar II	RAF Milltown	1946–1972	Moray	Scotland	
RNAS Milton; RNAS Pembroke	n/a	RAF Carew Cheriton; RAF Pembroke	1914–18	Pembrokeshire	Wales	
RNAS Narborough	n/a	RAF Narborough	Aug 1916-1916	Norfolk	England	Farmland to NE of RAF Marham
RNAS Nutts Corner	HMS Pintail	RAF Nutts Corner	1945–46	County Antrim	Northern Ireland	Transferred from RAF Northern Ireland on a loan basis. Commissioned as HMS Pintail on 11 July 1945. It was placed to care and maintenance status on 14 November 1945 'on the books of Gadwall'. Ultimately, it was decommissioned on 1 April 1946 and returned to the control of RAF Northern Ireland.
RNAS Peplow	HMS Godwit II; HMS Godwit	RAF Peplow	1945–49	Shropshire	England	Transferred from No. 21 Group RAF. It opened on 28 February 1945, commissioned HMS Godwit II, as a satellite of RNAS Hinstock. recommissioned HMS Godwit on 1 March 1947 following the closure of RNAS Hinstock. Home to the Central Naval Instrument Flying Training School. Paid off and closed by the end of 1949.
RNAS Portland	HMS Sarepta; HMS Osprey	RAF Portland	1959–1999	Dorset	England	From 1959 the station shared the name HMS Osprey, the anti-submarine establishment based at Portland
RNAS Prestwick	HMS Gannet	RAF Prestwick	1971–2016	South Ayrshire	Scotland	Now Glasgow Prestwick Airport
RNAS Pulham	n/a	RAF Pulham	1915-1918	Norfolk	England	Airship station
RNAS Rattray; RNAS Crimond; RNAS Rattray Head	HMS Merganser	n/a	1944–46	Aberdeenshire	Scotland	
RNAS Redcar		Redcar	1915–1919	North Yorkshire	England	
RNAS Roborough	HMS Drake II	RAF Roborough	1939–1942; Postwar	Devon	England	Civil aerodrome requisitioned by the Admiralty in September 1939 and commissioned on the books of Drake, RN Barracks, Devonport. Paid off on 1 May 1942 and transferred to No. 15 Group RAF control. Became Plymouth City Airport
RNAS Ronaldsway	HMS Urley	RAF Ronaldsway	1944–46		Isle of Man	
n/a	n/a	RAF St Davids	1947–1961	Pembrokeshire	Wales	Used by Airworks Air Direction Training Unit
RNAS St Merryn	HMS Vulture; HMS Curlew		1940–1956	Cornwall	England	It commissioned as HMS Vulture on 10 August 1940, and served as the home for the School of Naval Air Warfare. Additionally, it was parent to RNAS Treligga. It decommissioned as Vulture on 14 October 1953, but was recommissioned as HMS Curlew the next day.
RNAS Sandbanks	HMS Daedalus II	n/a	1940–43	Dorset	England	The Admiralty requisitioned the premises of the Royal Motor Yacht Club at Sandbanks, Poole Harbour, for the purpose of conducting Seaplane Flying Training Part I. It was opened in May 1940, put to care and maintenance in October 1943 and ultimately closed in late 1945.
RNAS Skaebrae	HMS Tern II	RAF Skaebrae	1940–?	Orkney	Scotland	Lodger facilities initially. The airfield was handed over to the Admiralty for control after the war, designated as a station in reserve.
RNAS South Denes	n/a	Great Yarmouth	1913–20	Norfolk	England	Base for both land and seaplanes that shot down three Zeppelins during WWI
RNAS Stornoway	HMS Mentor II	RAF Stornoway	1940–41; 1943–44	Western Isles	Scotland	Seaplanes operated from Stornoway harbour 1940–41. Subsequently, lodger facilities available at RAF Stornoway airfield.
RNAS Stretton	HMS Blackcap	n/a	1942–1958	Cheshire	England	It was handed over to the Admiralty from the RAF on loan on 9 March 1942. It was later converted to a permanent loan on 12 December 1942. This station was the parent station to RNAS Hinstock and the RN Air Section at RAF Speke. It discontinued flying operations on 1 August 1958.
RNAS Tresco	n/a	RAF Tresco	1917–19	Isles of Scilly, Cornwall	England	
RNAS Twatt	HMS Tern	n/a	1941–1957	Orkney	Scotland	Purpose built by the Admiralty, on books of Sparrowhawk, then independent Command Tern. Paid off on 20 October 1945 to care & maintenance, accounts on Owl
RNAS Walmer	n/a	RAF Walmer	1917–1918	Kent	England	Hawkshill Freedown (open land)
RNAS Woodvale	HMS Ringtail II	RAF Woodvale	1942–45; 1945–46	Merseyside	England	Lodger facilities only initially, satellite airfield postwar.
RNAS Worthy Down	HMS Kestrel; HMS Ariel	RAF Worthy Down	1938–39; 1939–1950; 1952–1960	Hampshire	England	Lodger facilities only pre WWII. Transferred from Air ministry to Admiralty control on 24 May 1939 and commissioned as HMS Kestrel. 31 March 1948 airfield closed to flying. Paid off on 9 January 1950, reduced to care & maintenance. Recommissoined on 1 July 1952 as HMS Ariel (main site) & HMS Ariel II (South camp), decommissioned on 1 November 1960. Now Worthy Down Camp
RNAS Zeals	HMS Hummingbird	RAF Zeals	1945–46	Wiltshire	England	

Airfields used in the British Isles by the Royal Navy where lodger facilities were granted and/or an Air Section was present
Location	RN Years active	County	Country	Notes
RAF Aldergrove	1939–40; 1977–1982	County Antrim	Northern Ireland	Naval units as lodgers on an RAF Base. Now Aldergrove Flying Station
RAF Benbecula	1944	Western Isles	Scotland	Lodger facilities from No. 15 Group RAF. Now Benbecula Airport and RRH Benbecula.
RAF Benson	1953–57; 2013-16	Oxfordshire	England	Lodger facilities for RNVR Squadrons and later Merlin HC3/3A Squadrons.
RAF Bircham Newton	1944-45	Norfolk	England	Lodger facilities from No. 16 Group RAF.
RAF Culmhead; RAF Churchstanton	1944	Somerset	England	Lodger facilities from No. 10 Group RAF for the 24th Naval Fighter Wing. Now Culmhead Business Centre
RAF Detling	1940–41	Kent	England	Lodger facilities from No. 16 Group RAF.
RAF Docking	1942–44	Norfolk	England	Lodger facilities from No. 16 Group RAF.
RAF Dundonald	1944	South Ayrshire	Scotland	Lodger facilities from No. 105 Wing RAF for the 3rd Naval Fighter Wing.
RAF Duxford	1941–43	Cambridgeshire	England	Lodger facilities from No. 12 Group RAF for Air Fighting Development Unit.
RAF Fraserburgh		Aberdeenshire	Scotland	Wartime lodger facilities only.
RAF Harrowbeer	1944	Devon	England	Lodger facilities from No. 10 Group RAF.
RAF Hawkinge	1944	Kent	England	Lodger facilities from N. 16 Group RAF.
Heathrow	1944–45	Greater London	England	Lodger facilities for a flight of 781 Naval Air Squadron only. Now Heathrow airport.
RAF Heston	1945-47	Middlesex	England	Lodger facilities for 701 Naval Air Squadron from Director General of Civil Aviation.
RAF Honiley	1955-57	Warwickshire	England	Lodger facilities for 718 and 1833 Naval Air Squadrons.
RAF Honington	1972-78	Suffolk	England	Lodger facilities, 809 Naval Air Squadron and the Buccaneer Support Unit.
RAF Langham	1942–44	Norfolk	England	Lodger facilities from No. 16 Group RAF.
RAF Leuchars	1972–78	Fife	Scotland	Lodger facilities for 892 Naval Air Squadron and the Phantom Post Operational Conversion Training Unit Flight. Now Leuchars Station.
RAF Long Kesh	1944–45	County Antrim	Northern Ireland	Lodger facilities from RAF Northern Ireland.
RAF Manston	1939–45; 1974	Kent	England	Lodger facilities during WWII from No. 12 Group RAF and used by 845 Naval Air Squadron briefly during early 1974. Now Manston Airport.
RAF Mullaghmore	1944-45	County Londonderry	England	Lodger facilities from No. 15 Group RAF.
RAF North Coates	1940–41	Lincolnshire	England	Lodger facilities from No. 16 Group RAF.
RAF Pembroke Dock	1940–41	Pembrokeshire	Wales	Lodger facilities for RN Air Section from No. 15 Group RAF.
RAF Perranporth	1944	Cornwall	England	Lodger facilities from No. 19 Group RAF.
RAF Peterhead	1942–44	Aberdeenshire	Scotland	Lodger facilities from Nos. 13 and 14 Groups RAF.
RAF Port Ellen	1943	Islay	Scotland	Lodger facilities from No. 15 Group RAF.
RAF St Eval	1940–44	Cornwall	England	Lodger facilities from Nos. 15 and 19 Groups RAF.
RAF St Mawgan; RAF Trebelzue	1954–56	Cornwall	England	Lodger facilities from No. 19 Group RAF for 744 Naval Air Squadron
RAF Skitten	1940–41	Highland	Scotland	Lodger facilities from No. No. 14 Group RAF.
RAF Speke	1942–45	Merseyside	England	Lodger facilities only initially from Nos. 9 and 15 Groups RAF, housed a RN Air Section. Now Liverpool John Lennon Airport
RAF Sullom Voe	1940–41	Shetland	Scotland	Lodger unit to No. 18 Group RAF on an RAF seaplane base.
RAF Sumburgh	1941–42	Shetland	Scotland	Lodger facilities from Nos. 14 and 18 Groups RAF. Now Sumburgh Airport
RAF Tain	1942–44	Ross-shire	Scotland	Lodger facilities from Nos. 14 and 18 Groups RAF.
RAF Tangmere	1942–50	West Sussex	England	Lodger facilities from Nos. 11 and 15 Groups RAF, the Naval Air Fighting Development Unit (NAFDU) was present at some point.
RAF Ternhill	?–46	Shropshire	England	RN Air Section.
RAF Thorney Island	1940–48	West Sussex	England	Lodger facilities only initially frokm No. 16 Group RAF, used by the Naval Air Sea Warfare Development Unit at some point. Now Baker Barracks.
RAF Turnhouse	1942–44	City of Edinburgh	Scotland	Lodger facilities from No. 13 Group RAF. Now Edinburgh Airport
RAF Watton	1947; 1951-57; 1963-66; 1966-69	Norfolk	England	Lodger facilities for 751 Naval Air Squadron 1940s-1950s, 831 Naval Air Squadron early sixties and 360 RN/RAF Squadron late sixties.
RAF West Freugh	1940–43	Dumfries and Galloway	Scotland	Lodger facilities from No. 25 Group RAF. Now MoD West Freugh.
RAF Westhampnett	1945	Sussesx	England	Lodger facilities from No. 11 Group RAF.
RAF West Raynham	1945-46	Norfolk	England	Lodger facilities from No. 11 Group RAF. Naval units attached to the RAF Central Fighter Establishment.
RAF Wick	1939-40	Caithness	Scotland	Lodger facilities from No. 13 Group RAF.
RAF Wittering	1943-45	Northamptonshire	England	Lodger facilities from No. 12 Group RAF. Naval units attached to the Air Fighting Development Unit.
RAF Yatesbury	1947	Wiltshire	England	RN Section as part of RAF Flying Training.

=== Weapons Ranges ===
List of previously established air weapons ranges (AWR) of the Royal Navy's Fleet Air Arm located in the United Kingdom. Note: although FAA aircraft have used other weapons ranges in the UK and abroad, operated by other authorities:

Royal Navy's Fleet Air Arm air weapons ranges within the United Kingdom, including name, commission and Royal Air Force name where applicable
Name	Ship's name	RAF Station	RN Years active	Current county	Country	Notes
RNAS Banff	n/a	RAF Banff	1947-72	Aberdeenshire	Scotland	Used for simulated bombing by RNAS Lossiemouth units. Unmanned satellite to RNAS Lossiemouth. Part of the site is now Boyndie wind farm.
Royal Navy Aircraft Range Lilstock	n/a	n/a	2014	Somerset	England	Coastal range on Bridgwater Bay, controlled by RNAS Yeovilton. From 1995 the site was reclassified as a helicopter gunnery range only.
RNAS Tain	n/a	RAF Tain	1946–72	Highland	Scotland	Tain Air Weapons Range. Parented by RNAS Lossiemouth, transferred from RAF at the same time. Air-to-ground weapons range on coast next to Tain airfield.
RNAS Treligga	Vulture II	n/a	1940-55	Cornwall	England	Fleet Air Arm live firing range & emergency landing ground under control of RNAS St Merryn, then RNAS Culdrose from 1953.

=== Overseas ===
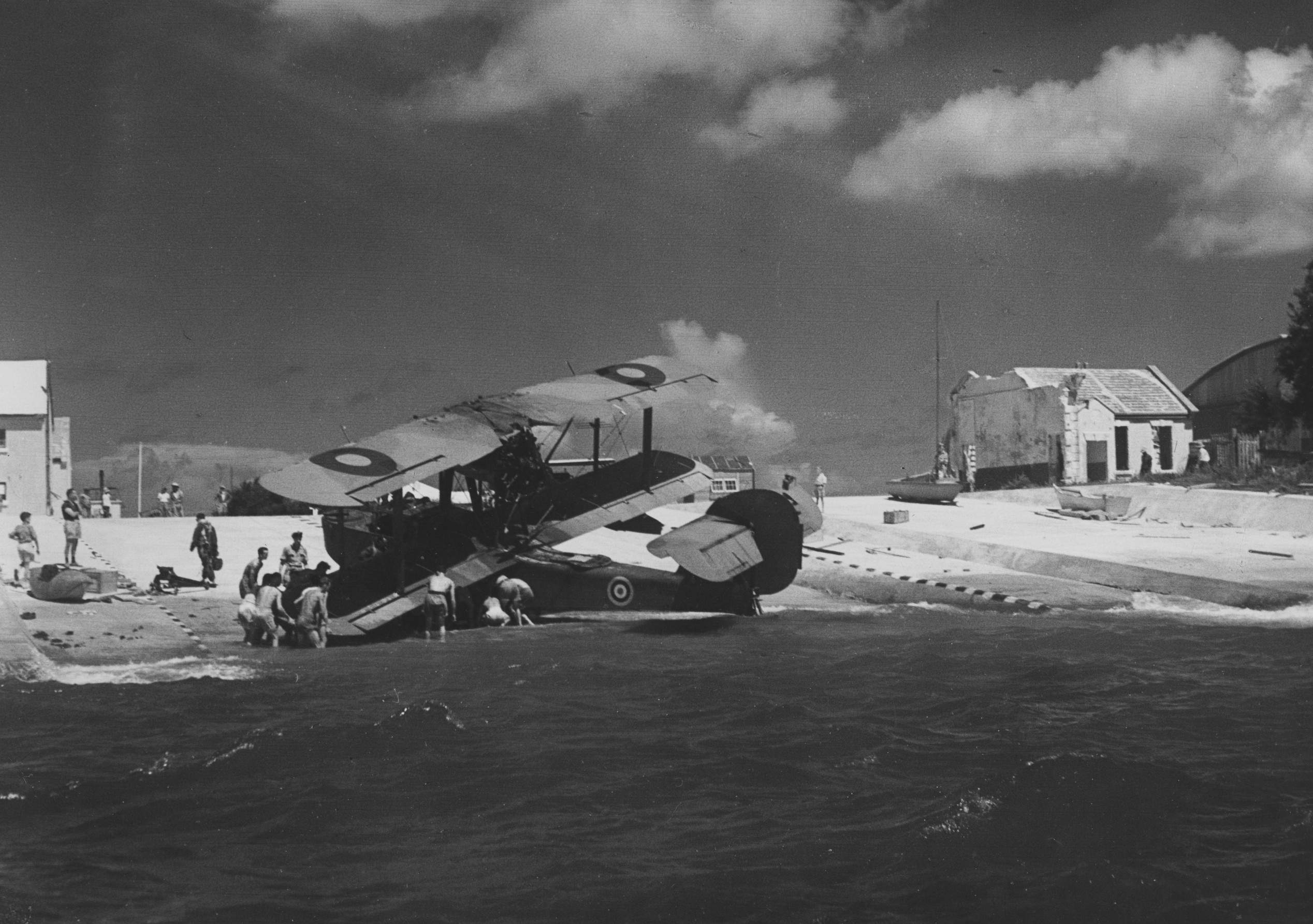
Supermarine Walrus at Royal Naval Air Station Bermuda at Boaz Island

This list is of former air stations of the Royal Navy located outside of the British Isles. The list includes airbases wholly operated by the Admiralty and those where lodger facilities from the RAF were granted and operated under a RN Air Section.

RNAS	HMS	RAF	RN Years active	Current county	Country	Notes
n/a	Nile II	Aboukir	1935–42		Egypt	Lodger facilities for a RN Air Section on RAF Station
Addu Atoll	Haitian; Maraga	Gan	1942-45		Maldives	Purpose built for the Admiralty. Transferred to the RAF. Now Gan International Airport
n/a	Ironclad	Andrakaka	1942-43		Madagascar	Captured Vichy French airfield, RN Air Section
Archerfield	Nabsford; Nabreekie	n/a	1945–46	Queensland	Australia	RNAMY Archerfield used for: TAMY I (Transportable Aircraft Maintenance Yard No. 1); MONAB VII
Argentia	Avalon III	n/a	1943–44	Newfoundland	Canada	Lodger facilities for RN Air Section at US Naval Air Station Argentia, now Naval Station Argentia
Bankstown	Nabberley	n/a	1944–46	New South Wales	Australia	MONAB II. Now Bankstown Airport
Bermuda	Malabar	n/a	1939-44	Sandys Parish	Bermuda	Operated from North Yard of Royal Naval Dockyard, Bermuda on Ireland Island until relocating to Boaz Island in 1940. Care-and-maintenance status by 1945. Disposed of with other Admiralty and War Office land in 1950s
Brunswick	Saker	n/a	1943-45	Maine	United States	U.S. Navy's Naval Air Station Brunswick loaned to the Admiralty
Coimbatore	Garuda	n/a	1942–46	Cochin	(British Raj) British Indian Empire	Aircraft Repair Yard. Parent station to: RN Air Section Cochin, RN Air Station Sulur. Now Coimbatore International Airport
Colombo Racecourse	Bherunda	Colombo Racecourse	1943–45	Colombo	British Ceylon	Now Colombo Racecourse
Dartmouth	Seaborn	n/a	1940–46	Nova Scotia	Canada	Lodger facilities for an RN air section at an RCAF base only. Now CFB Shearwater
Dekheila	Grebe; Nile II	LG-34/LG-235	1940–46		Egypt	
Durban	Kongoni	n/a	1940-46	Durban	South Africa	R.N. Air Section Durban at S.A.A.F. Station, Stamford Hill
Fayid	Phoenix	Fayid	1941-46		Egypt	R.N. Aircraft Repair Yard. RAF station transferred to Admiralty control
Floyd Bennett Field	Saker	n/a	1942-		United States	Lodger facilities for an RN Air Section and disembarked squadrons from 1942.
Hal Far	Falcon	Hal Far	1929–50; 1952–67		Malta	
Hastings	Spurwing	Hastings	1943–44		British Sierra Leone	Lodger facilities until 1943
Hiswa	Rapax	Hiswa			(Aden Colony) Aden Protectorate	Lodger facility for an RN Air Section on RAF station. Transferred to the Admiralty for development as Royal Naval Air Station
Jervis Bay	Nabswick	n/a	1945–46	New South Wales	Australia	MONAB V
Kai Tak	Nabcatcher; Flycatcher	Kai Tak	1938–40; 1945-78	Kowloon Bay	(British Hong Kong) Hong Kong	MONAB VIII. Lodger facilities 1948 - 1978
Kaldadarnes	Baldur II	Kaldadarnes	1943		Iceland	Lodger facilities for an RN Air Section
Katukurunda	Ukussa	Katukurunda	1942-46	Katukurunda	British Ceylon.	Transferred from the Royal Air Force in 1942 and returned in 1946. Now Katukurunda Airport
Kilindini	Kipanga	n/a	1942–44	Mombasa	(East Africa Protectorate) Kenya	
Komenda	Wara	Takoradi	Oct–Dec 1943		(Gold Coast (British colony)) Gold Coast	Now Takoradi Airport
Lewiston	Saker	n/a	1943–45	Maine	United States	Now Auburn/Lewiston Municipal Airport
Mackinnon Road	Tana; Kipanga II	n/a	1942–44	Taita-Taveta	(East Africa Protectorate) Kenya	Now Mackinnon Road Airport
Maharagama	Monara	n/a	1943–46	Maharagama	British Ceylon	Royal Naval Air Ceylonese Training Establishment in Maharagama which was later taken over by the National Teachers' Training College.
Maryborough	Nabstock	n/a	1945–46	Queensland	Australia	MONAB VI
Minnerya	n/a	Minnerya	1942–46		British Ceylon	Lodger facilities only. Now Hingurakgoda Airport
Nairobi	Korongo	n/a	1942-44	Nairobi	(East Africa Protectorate) Kenya	R.N. Aircraft Repair Yard. Reserve aircraft storage. Now Wilson Airport
Norfolk	Saker	n/a			United States	Lodger facilities at a US Naval Station Norfolk Chambers Field for FAA squadrons and an Air Section.
Nowra	Nabbington; Nabswick	n/a	Jan–Nov 1945; 1945–1946	New South Wales	Australia	MONAB I MONAB V. Now HMAS Albatross (air station)
Palisadoes	Malabar III; Buzzard	n/a	1941–43	Kingston	Jamaica	Now Norman Manley International Airport
Piarco	Malabar II; Goshawk	n/a	1940–46		Trinidad and Tobago	Now Piarco International Airport
Ponam	Nabaron	n/a	Apr–Nov 1945	Admiralty Islands	Papua New Guinea	MONAB IV. Former United States Navy airstrip transferred to the RN on loan
Port Reitz	Kipanga	Port Reitz	1942-44	Mombasa	(East Africa Protectorate) Kenya	Lodger facilities for an RN Air Section at an RAF station. Now Moi International Airport
Puttalam	Rajaliya	n/a	1942–45	Puttalam District	British Ceylon	Now SLAF Palavi (Sri Lanka Air Force Palavi).
Quonset Point	Asbury	n/a	1942–43	Rhode Island	United States	Now Quonset Point Air National Guard Station
Ras el-Tin Point	Nile		Apr 1939– Jun 1946	Alexandria	Egypt	
Schofields	Nabthorpe; Nabstock	n/a	Feb–Nov 1945; Nov 1945–June 1946	New South Wales	Australia	MONAB III; MONAB VI. Now HMAS Nirimba, up for sale.
Sembawang	Simbang; Nabrock	Sembawang	1939-71		Singapore	MONAB IX. Now Sembawang Air Base
Sigiriya	n/a	Sigiriya			British Ceylon	Lodger facilities only. Now Sigiriya Airport
Squantum	Saker	n/a	1943-44	Norfolk County, Massachusetts	United States	US Naval Air Station Squantum loaned to the Admiralty.
Sulur	Vairi	n/a	1944-46		(British Raj) British Indian Empire	Now Sulur Air Force Station
Tafaraouri	Cormorant II	n/a	1943-44		Algeria	Lodger facility for an RN Air Section on Twelfth Air Force fighter station. Later Lodger rights for one squadron. Now Oran Tafraoui Airport
Takali	Goldfinch; St Angelo	Ta Kali	1945–53		Malta	1943 RN Lodger unit, 1944 Transferred to RN on temporary loan in February, 1945 Full control transferred to Admiralty in April
Tambaram	Valluru	Tambaram	1944–45	Madras	(British Raj) British Indian Empire	Now Tambaram Air Force Station
Tanga	Kilele	n/a	1942–44		Tanganyika	Now Tanga Airport
Trincomalee	Bambara	China Bay	1940-50	Trincomalee	British Ceylon	Lodger facility for RN Air Section from August 1940. Station transferred to the Admiralty on 15 November 1944 and renamed RNAS Trincomalee. Now China Bay Airport
Vizagapatam	n/a	Vizagapatam	1944-45		(British Raj) British Indian Empire	Lodger facilities for an RN Fleet Requirements Unit. Now INS Dega
Voi	Tana; Kipanga II	n/a	1944		(East Africa Protectorate) Kenya	Never commissioned
Wingfield	Malagas	n/a	1942–46	Western Cape	South Africa	Was Wingfield Aerodrome, now SAS Wingfield
Yarmouth	Canada; Seaborn	n/a	1943-45	Nova Scotia	Canada	Lodger facilities for an RN air section at an RCAF base only. RCAF Station Yarmouth

== Mobile Naval Air Base ==
The Mobile Operational Naval Air Base (MONAB) were designed to have all the capabilities of an air station or an aircraft carrier, to support the Fleet Air Arm, and that could be deployed anywhere around the world. There were eleven commissioned units, ten MONABs and one Transportable Aircraft Maintenance Yard (TAMY), ten of these saw active service for the British Pacific Fleet:

Commissioned Mobile Operational Naval Air Bases (MONABs) and Transportable Aircraft Maintenance Yards (TAMYs)
Unit Name	Ship's name	Commissioned	Paid Off	Located
MONAB I	HMS Nabbington	28 October 1944	15 November 1945	Nowra, Australia
MONAB II	HMS Nabberley	18 November 1944	31 March 1946	Bankstown, Australia
MONAB III	HMS Nabthorpe	4 December 1944	15 November 1945	Schofields, New South Wales, Australia
MONAB IV	HMS Nabaron	1 January 1945	10 November 1945	Ponam, Manus Island, Admiralty Islands
MONAB V	HMS Nabswick	1 Feb 1945	18 Mar 1946	Jervis Bay, Australia
MONAB VI	HMS Nabstock	1 Apr 1945	9 Jun 1946	Maryborough, Queensland, Australia
MONAB VII	HMS Nabreekie	1 Jun 1945	5 Nov 1945	Meeandah, Brisbane, Australia
MONAB VIII	HMS Nabcatcher	1 Jul 1945	1 Apr 1947	Kai Tak, Hong Kong
MONAB IX	HMS Nabrock	1 Aug 1945	15 Dec 1945	Sembawang, Singapore
MONAB X	HMS Nabhurst	1 Sep1945	12 Oct 1945	Middle Wallop, Hampshire, England
TAMY I	HMS Nabsford	1 Feb 1945	31 Mar 1946	Brisbane, Queensland, Australia

== Former naval air stations by ship name (HMS xxx) ==
HMS is an abbreviation for His Majesty's Ship (or Her Majesty's Ship).

Some smaller and some very early Naval Air Stations in the list above were not commissioned as HM Ship(s). Those below were commissioned and, therefore, have a ship's name. Royal Navy shore bases and naval air stations have traditionally been named in the same manner as seagoing ships.

Officers were appointed to HMS xxx rather than to RNAS xxx and, similarly, ratings' Service Certificates will show only the name of the ship when drafted to a Naval Air Station. Thus, this list may help when researching family history records.

A compilation of establishments by the ships names, both domestically and internationally. This encompasses Air Stations, Air Sections, Air Maintenance & Repair Yards, as well as Lodger units located at RAF stations.
Ship's name	Nearest Town	County	Country	Current use
HMS Ariel	Winchester	Hampshire	England	MOD Worthy Down
HMS Ariel	Lee-on-the-Solent	Hampshire	England	Solent Airport Daedalus
HMS Asbury	Quonset Point	Rhode Island	United States	Quonset Point Air National Guard Station
HMS Bambara	Trincomalee		Ceylon	China Bay Airport
HMS Berhunda	Colombo		Ceylon	Colombo Racecourse
HMS Blackcap	Stretton	Cheshire	England	Appleton Thorn Industrial Estate; HM Prison Thorn Cross
HMS Buzzard	Lympne	Kent	England	Industrial estate
HMS Buzzard	Palisadoes	Kingston	Jamaica	Norman Manley International Airport
HMS Condor	Arbroath	Angus	Scotland	RM Condor
HMS Corncrake	Ballyhalbert	County Down	Northern Ireland	Housing
HMS Corncrake II	Portavogie	County Down	Northern Ireland	Kirkistown Circuit
HMS Curlew	St Merryn	Cornwall	England	Farmland
HMS Daedalus	Lee-on-the-Solent	Hampshire	England	Solent Airport Daedalus
HMS Daedalus II	Lympne	Kent	England	Industrial Estate
HMS Daedalus II	Sandbanks	Dorset	England	in Poole Harbour
HMS Daedalus II	Lawrenny	Pembrokeshire	Wales	Riverbank slipway
HMS Dipper	Henstridge	Somerset	England	Henstridge Airfield
HMS Europa II	Bungay	Suffolk	England	Farmland
HMS Falcon	Ħal Far		Malta	Industrial Estate
HMS Fieldfare	Evanton	Ross and Cromarty	Scotland	Industrial Estate
HMS Flycatcher	Ludham	Norfolk	England	Farmland/private airstrip
HMS Flycatcher	Middle Wallop	Hampshire	England	AAC Middle Wallop
HMS Flycatcher	Kai Tak	Kowloon Bay	Hong Kong	Kai Tak Development
HMS Fulmar	Lossiemouth	Morayshire	Scotland	RAF Lossiemouth
HMS Fulmar II	Elgin	Morayshire	Scotland	Farmland / Industry
HMS Gadwall	Sydenham	Belfast	Northern Ireland	Sydenham Airport 1938–1941, RAF Belfast 1941-1943 and 1973–1978, Belfast City Airport (George Best Belfast City Airport) 1978–present
HMS Gamecock	Bramcote	Warwickshire	England	Gamecock Barracks
HMS Gannet	Eglinton	Co. Londonderry	Northern Ireland	City of Derry Airport
HMS Gannet	Prestwick	South Ayrshire	Scotland	Glasgow Prestwick Airport
HMS Gannet II	Maydown	Co. Londonderry	Northern Ireland	Industry
HMS Gannet III	Sydenham	Belfast	Northern Ireland	George Best Belfast City Airport
HMS Garuda	Coimbatore		India	Coimbatore International Airport
HMS Godwit	Ollerton	Shropshire	England	Farmland / Industry
HMS Godwit	Peplow	Shropshire	England	Farmland
HMS Godwit II	Weston-under-Lizard	Shropshire	England	Ground in Weston Park
HMS Goldcrest	Angle	Pembrokeshire	Wales	Farmland
HMS Goldcrest	Brawdy	Pembrokeshire	Wales	Cawdor Barracks
HMS Goldcrest	Dale	Pembrokeshire	Wales	Farmland
HMS Goldcrest II	Brawdy	Pembrokeshire	Wales	Cawdor Barracks
HMS Goldfinch	Ta' Qali		Malta	Park
HMS Goshawk	Piarco		Trinidad	Piarco International Airport
HMS Grebe	Alexandria		Egypt	
HMS Heron II	Charlton Horethorne	Somerset	England	Farmland
HMS Heron II	Haldon Hills	Devon	England	Open land
HMS Hornbill	Culham, Abingdon	Oxfordshire	England	Fusion research facility
HMS Hornbill II	Beccles	Suffolk	England	Various
HMS Hummingbird	Zeals	Wiltshire	England	Farmland
HMS Icarus	Scapa Flow	Orkney	Scotland	?
HMS Jackdaw	Crail	Fife	Scotland	Farmland / Industry / Crail Raceway
HMS Jackdaw II	Kingsbarns	Fife	Scotland	Farmland
HMS Kalugu	Cochin		India	
HMS Kestrel	South Wonston	Hampshire	England	Worthy Down Camp
HMS Kilele	Tanga		Tanzania	Tanga Airport
HMS Kipanga	Kilindini	Mombasa County	Kenya	
HMS Kipanga II	Mackinnon Road	Taita-Taveta County	Kenya	
HMS Kipanga II	Moi International Airport	Mombasa County	Kenya	Moi International Airport
HMS Kongoni	Durban		South Africa	
HMS Korongo	Nairobi		Kenya	
HMS Landrail	Machrihanish	Argyllshire	Scotland	Campbeltown Airport
HMS Landrail II	Campbeltown	Argyllshire	Scotland	Farmland
HMS Malabar	Boaz Island	Sandys Parish	Bermuda	All shore personnel at Bermuda, including RNAS, belonged to the stone frigate HMS Malabar. Operated from North Yard of Royal Naval Dockyard, Bermuda on Ireland Island until relocating to Boaz Island in 1940. Care-and-maintenance status by 1945. Disposed of with other Admiralty and War Office land in 1950s. Housing.
HMS Malagas	Cape Town	Western Cape	South Africa	Wingfield Aerodrome / SAS Wingfield
HMS Mentor II	Stornoway	Outer Hebrides	Scotland	Stornoway Airport
HMS Merganser	Rattray	Aberdeenshire	Scotland	Long range radio station
HMS Merlin	Donibristle	Fife	Scotland	Dalgety Bay
HMS Nabaron	Ponam Island		Papua New Guinea	
HMS Nabberley	Bankstown		Australia	Bankstown Airport
HMS Nabbington	Nowra		Australia	HMAS Albatross
HMS Nabcatcher	Kowloon Bay	Kowloon Peninsula	Hong Kong	Kai Tak Development
HMS Nabhurst	Middle Wallop	Hampshire	England	Middle Wallop Flying Station
HMS Nabreekie	Pinkenba	Brisbane	Australia	
HMS Nabrock	Sembawang		Singapore	Sembawang Air Base
HMS Nabsford	Brisbane	Queensland	Australia	Archerfield Airport
HMS Nabstock	Maryborough	Queensland	Australia	Maryborough Airport
HMS Nabswick	Jervis Bay	New South Wales	Australia	Jervis Bay Airfield
HMS Nabthorpe	Schofields	New South Wales	Australia	RAAF Station Schofields
HMS Nighthawk	Drem	East Lothian	Scotland	Farmland/industry/RAF Drem Museum
HMS Nighthawk II	Haddington	East Lothian	Scotland	Farmland/industry
HMS Nightjar	Inskip	Lancashire	England	Farmland/industry
HMS Nile II	Alexandria		Egypt	Farmland
HMS Nuthatch	Anthorn	Cumbria	England	Anthorn Radio Station
HMS Osprey	Portland	Dorset	England	Coastguard base
HMS Owl	Fearn	Ross and Cromarty	Scotland	Aviation / Farmland / Industry
HMS Peewit	East Haven	Angus	Scotland	Farmland / Water treatment works
HMS Peregrine	Ford	West Sussex	England	HM Prison Ford
HMS Phoenix	Fayed	Ismailia Governorate	Egypt	
HMS Pintail	Crumlin	Co. Antrim	Northern Ireland	Industry / Leisure / Public road
HMS Rajaliya	Puttalam	North Western Province	Ceylon	
HMS Rapax	Hiswa		Aden Protectorate	
HMS Raven	Eastleigh	Hampshire	England	Southampton International Airport
HMS Ringtail	Burscough/Ormskirk	Lancashire	England	Farmland / Industry
HMS Ringtail II	Woodvale	Merseyside	England	RAF Woodvale
HMS Robin	Kirkwall	Orkney	Scotland	Kirkwall Airport
HMS Sanderling	Abbotsinch	Renfrewshire	Scotland	Glasgow Airport
HMS Saker II	Quonset Point	Rhode Island	United States	Quonset Point Air National Guard Station
HMS Sambur	Plaine Magnien		Mauritius	Sir Seewoosagur Ramgoolam International Airport
HMS Sarepta	Portland	Dorset	England	Industry
HMS Seaborn	Halifax	Nova Scotia	Canada	CFB Shearwater
HMS Sealion	Ballykelly	Co. Londonderry	Northern Ireland	Shackleton Barracks
HMS Seruwa	Ratmalana	Western Province	Sri Lanka	Ratmalana Airport
HMS Shrike	Maydown	Co. Londonderry	Northern Ireland	Industry
HMS Simbang	Sembawang		Singapore	Sembawang Air Base
HMS Siskin	Gosport	Hampshire	England	HMS Sultan
HMS Sparrowhawk	Kirkwall	Orkney	Scotland	Industrial Estate
HMS Sparrowhawk	Halesworth	Suffolk	England	Farmland / Industry / Museum / Public road / Solar farm / Wind farm
HMS Spurwing	Hastings	Western Area	Sierra Leone	
HMS Tern	Twatt	Orkney	Scotland	Open land
HMS Tern II	Kirkwall	Orkney	Scotland	Industrial Estate
HMS Tern III	Dounreay	Caithness	Scotland	Vulcan Naval Reactor Test Establishment
HMS Ukussa	Kalutara	Western Province	Ceylon	Katukurunda Airport
HMS Urley	Ronaldsway		Isle of Man	Isle of Man Airport
HMS Vairi	Coimbatore	Tamil Nadu	India	Sulur Air Force Station
HMS Valluru	Madras	Madras State	India	Tambaram Air Force Station
HMS Vulture	St Merryn	Cornwall	England	Farmland
HMS Vulture II	Treligga	Cornwall	England	Farmland
HMS Wagtail	Heathfield	South Ayrshire	Scotland	Housing estate
HMS Wara	Sekondi-Takoradi		Ghana	Takoradi Airport

== See also ==
- List of airports in the United Kingdom and the British Crown Dependencies
- List of Royal Air Force stations
- List of Royal Navy shore establishments
- Royal Navy Dockyard
- Seaplane bases in the United Kingdom
- Aircraft Handler
- List of airfields of the Army Air Corps
- Lists of military installations
- List of British Army installations
- Mobile Naval Air Base
