= HMS Corncrake =

One ship and two shore establishments of the Royal Navy have borne the name HMS Corncrake:

- HMS Corncrake was the name of an RN minelaying converted trawler, lost in the Atlantic in January 1943.
- HMS Corncrake (shore establishment) a Royal Navy stone frigate for the Fleet Air Arm, at Ballyhalbert, County Down. Known as Royal Naval Air Station Ballyhalbert, it was situated on the former RAF Ballyhalbert and was paid off in 1946.
- HMS Corncrake II (shore establishment), a stone frigate RNAS Kirkistown and a satellite airfield for RNAS Ballyhalbert between 1945 and 1946.
