= 765 Naval Air Squadron =

Inactive flying squadron of the Royal Navy's Fleet Air Arm

- Squadron badge
- Active: 1939–1943; 1944–1946; 1955–1957
- Disbanded: 25 March 1957
- Country: United Kingdom
- Branch: Royal Navy
- Type: Fleet Air Arm Second Line Squadron
- Role: Basic Seaplane Training and Pool Squadron; Travelling Recording Unit; Transport Squadron; Piston Engine Pilot Pool
- Size: Squadron
- Part of: Fleet Air Arm
- Home station: See Naval air stations section for full list.
- Mottos: Praesidium navibus (Latin for 'A safeguard for ships')
- Aircraft: See Aircraft operated section for full list.

Insignia
- Squadron Badge Description: Blue, a dragon statant gold armed and langued red holding in his dexter claw a stabbing spear point downward also gold (1945)
- Identification Markings: Y8A+ (Swordfish & Seafox); L3A+ & LB3A+ (Walrus); BL3A+ (Kingfisher); L8A+ (Wellington) individual letters (1945 to 1946); 272-280 & 329-336 (Firefly); 623-624 (Oxford); 717-724 (Firefly from January 1956); 729-730 (Oxford from January 1956); 791-794 (Sea Balliol)
- Fin Shore Codes: CU (1956 - 1957)

765 Naval Air Squadron (765 NAS) was a Fleet Air Arm (FAA) naval air squadron of the United Kingdom’s Royal Navy (RN). It formed at RNAS Lee-on-Solent (HMS Daedalus), in May 1939, as a Seaplane School and Pool squadron. The squadron moved to RNAS Sandbanks, in August 1940, where it undertook the Seaplane Flying Training Course Part I. Lieutenant Commander J.B. Wilson was appointed as dual officer in charge of the air base, and Commanding officer of 765 NAS. By the middle of 1943, dedicated Seaplane Training schools ended and the squadron disbanded in the October. 765 NAS reformed at RNAS Charlton Horethorne (HMS Heron II), in early February 1944, as a Travelling Recording Unit. The squadron moved to RNAS Lee-on-Solent (HMS Daedalus) in March, before moving to RNAS Worthy Down (HMS Kestrel) on one month later during April, then in May it moved to RNAS Stretton (HMS Blackcap), where it remained during June.

The squadron returned to RNAS Lee-on-Solent (HMS Daedalus) at the start of August 1944, it was equipped with Vickers Wellington, a British twin-engined, long-range medium bomber aircraft, which were fitted with radar and used to record the effectiveness of other radar units. It moved to RNAS Twatt (HMS Tern) in September, operating there until the November, when it flew to RAF Eastchurch and then onto RAF Hornchurch. The squadron provided naval co-operation in liaison with No. 567 Squadron, an anti-aircraft co-operation squadron of the Royal Air Force; after the end of World War II, the squadron moved to RAF Manston in June 1945. 765 NAS's next move was to Malta, in the October, based at RNAS Hal Far (HMS Falcon), it provided air transport for personnel, stationed within the Mediterranean Rim, to return home, via Malta. It disbanded at Hal Far in April 1946.

765 Naval Air Squadron reformed for the third time, in May 1955, at RNAS Culdrose (HMS Seahawk) as a Piston Engine Pilot Pool and it also provided refresher flying for Fleet Air Arm pilots. For almost two years, it trained over two hundred pilots, on either Fairey Firefly, a carrier-borne fighter and anti-submarine aircraft, or Airspeed Oxford, a twin-engine monoplane trainer aircraft, with the squadron disbanding, at RNAS Culdrose (HMS Seahawk), in March 1957.

== History ==
=== Basic Seaplane Training and Pool Squadron (1939–1943) ===
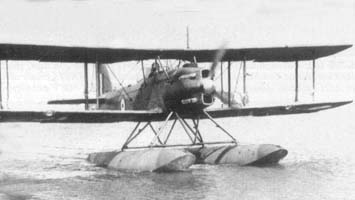
Fairey Seafox, Fleet Air Arm spotter / reconnaissance floatplane, of the type used by 765 NAS

765 Naval Air Squadron formed at RNAS Lee-on-Solent (HMS Daedalus), situated next to Lee-on-the-Solent in Hampshire, on the 24 May 1939, as a Basic Seaplane Training and Pool Squadron. It was initially equipped with Supermarine Walrus, an amphibious maritime patrol aircraft, along with, Fairey Seafox, a reconnaissance floatplane and Fairey Swordfish seaplane variant, a torpedo bomber aircraft. The squadron trained pilots in operating seaplane aircraft and provided a pilot reserve for Fleet Air Arm catapult squadrons. In February 1940, 765 Naval Air Squadron received two Blackburn Roc turret fighter aircraft fitted with floats, for evaluation.

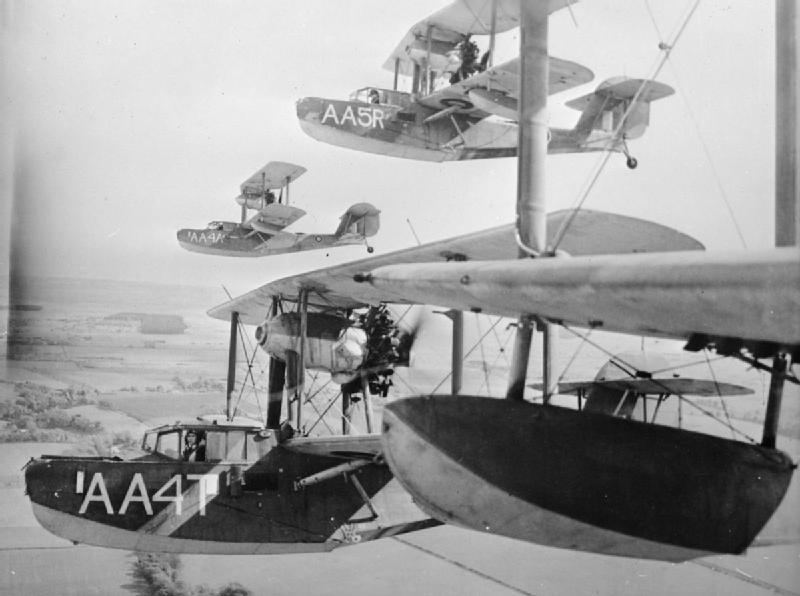
Fleet Air Arm Supermarine Walrus amphibious aircraft, flying in close formation, an example of the type used by 765 NAS.

On the 26 August 1940, the squadron moved to RNAS Sandbanks, located on the premises of the Royal Motor Yacht Club (RMYC) at Sandbanks, Poole Harbour, Dorset, which had been requisitioned as a Seaplane base by the Admiralty, taking its collection of Supermarine Walrus amphibious aircraft, and Fairey Swordfish, Fairey Seafox and Blackburn Roc floatplane aircraft. Here it had a new role, providing the Seaplane Flying Training Course Part I, of the basic Seaplane training.

In June 1941 both the Fairey Swordfish and Blackburn Roc aircraft were withdrawn from squadron use; The Fairey Seafox aircraft were withdrawn one year later in June 1942, however, at the same time, United States built Vought Kingfisher seaplane aircraft arrived. By mid 1943, the need for dedicated Seaplane Training squadrons had passed and on 25 October 1943, 765 Naval Air Squadron disbanded.

=== Travelling Recording Unit (1944–1945) ===
765 Naval Air Squadron reformed, on the 10 February 1944, at RNAS Charlton Horethorne (HMS Heron II), situated in the hamlet of Sigwells in Somerset, England, as a Travelling Recording Unit. The squadron briefly moved to RNAS Lee-on-Solent (HMS Daedalus), on the 18 March 1944. One month later, on the 18 April 1944, it relocated to RNAS Worthy Down (HMS Kestrel), located 3.5 miles (6 km) north of Winchester, Hampshire, England, then on the last day of May, it travelled to RNAS Stretton (HMS Blackcap), in the village of Appleton Thorn, south of Warrington, in Cheshire, England. However, at the beginning of August, the squadron returned to RNAS Lee-on-Solent.

In the same month, the squadron was equipped with Vickers Wellington, initially designed as a medium bomber aircraft. It received three Vickers Wellington GR Mark XI, maritime reconnaissance aircraft. They were ex-RAF Coastal Command and were fitted with ASV Mark II radar. A fourth Vickers Wellington aircraft arrived, a T Mark XVII training aircraft, in the following December and this was fitted with a nose-mounted aircraft interception (AI) radar. The squadron primarily operated these aircraft to test the efficiency of radar units, however, as the Vickers Wellington was also capable of, and used for, long-range aerial reconnaissance, experienced aerial photographers were assigned to the squadron.

On the 30 September, 765 Naval Air Squadron moved to RNAS Twatt (HMS Tern), located near Twatt, Orkney, Scotland. It remained on Orkney for ten days, before relocating to RAF Hornchurch, located in the parish of Hornchurch, southeast of Romford, Essex, going via RAF Eastchurch, on the Isle of Sheppey, Kent, England, arriving at RAF Hornchurch on the 14 November, where the role of the squadron was to provide naval co-operation in liaison with No. 567 Squadron RAF, an anti-aircraft co-operation unit. However, seven months later, 765 Naval Air Squadron moved to RAF Manston, located in the north-east of Kent, on the Isle of Thanet, on the 14 June 1945.

=== Transport Squadron (1945–1946) ===
In August, 765 Naval Air Squadron was repurposed as a Transport Squadron. It operated three Vickers Wellington B Mark X aircraft, however, these were equipped with troop transport type seating. On 6 October 1945, the squadron moved to RNAS Hal Far (HMS Falcon), which was located at the southern extreme of Malta. It provided air transport for personnel, to and from different parts of the Mediterranean Basin, but primarily bringing them back to Malta for onward travel home.

765 Naval Air Squadron continued in this role until disbanding at RNAS Hal Far (HMS Falcon) on 30 April 1946.

=== Piston Engine Pilot Pool (1955–1957) ===
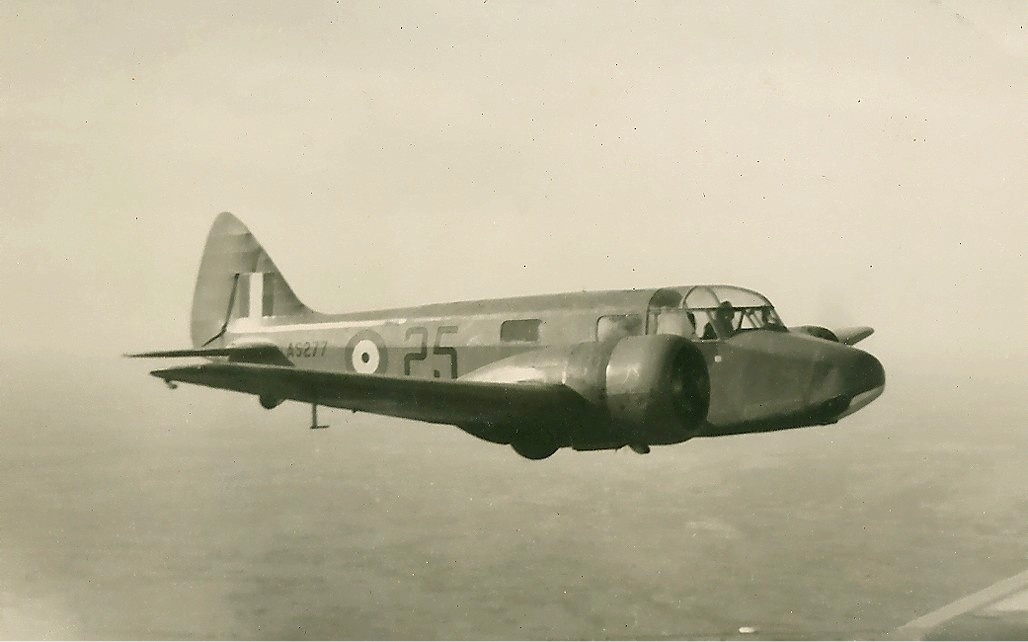
Airspeed AS.10 Oxford II, an example of the type used by 765 NAS.

765 Naval Air Squadron reformed at RNAS Culdrose (HMS Seahawk), near Helston on the Lizard Peninsula of Cornwall, England, on 14 February 1955, as a Piston Engine Pilot Pool. The squadron was initially equipped with Fairey Firefly a Second World War-era carrier-borne fighter and anti-submarine aircraft, but specifically the T.Mk 2, an armed operational training aircraft and T.Mk 7 an Anti-Submarine Warfare (ASW) training aircraft and also provided refresher flying for FAA pilots. In May 1955, the squadron added Airspeed Oxford II, a twin-engined training aircraft, to its inventory.

In February 1957, Boulton Paul Sea Balliol T.Mk 21, a Fleet Air Arm advanced trainer aircraft and de Havilland Sea Devon C Mk 20, a transport and communications version, for the Royal Navy, of the de Havilland Dove short-haul airliner, were also added, however, the squadron only lasted around one more month, with 765 Naval Air Squadron disbanding at RNAS Culdrose (HMS Seahawk) on 25 March 1957.

During its two years of existence, the squadron converted two-hundred and forty-four pilots to either Fairey Firefly or Airspeed Oxford aircraft.

== Aircraft operated ==
The squadron has operated a number of different aircraft types, including:

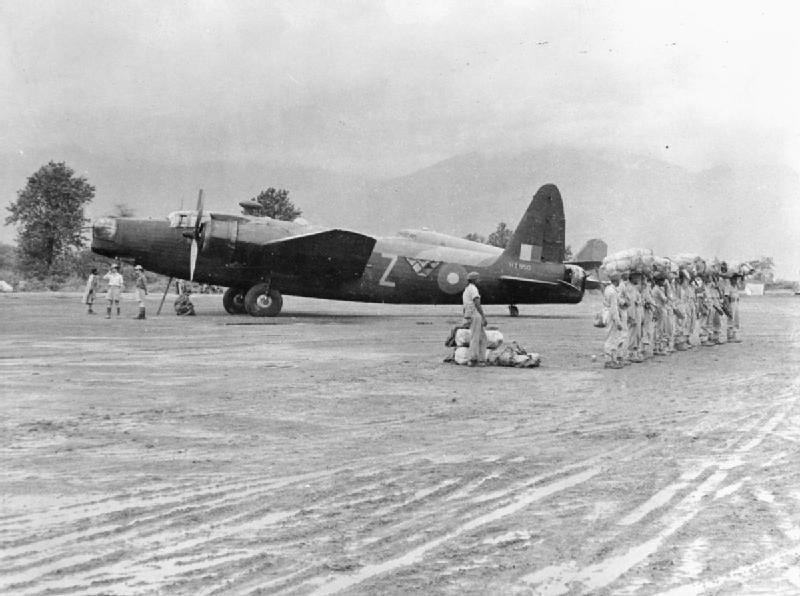
Vickers Wellington B Mark X

- Fairey Seafox I ship-borne reconnaissance seaplane (May 1939 - June 1942)
- Fairey Swordfish I version equipped with floats torpedo bomber (May 1939 - June 1941)
- Supermarine Walrus I amphibious maritime patrol aircraft (May 1939 - October 1942)
- Blackburn Roc equipped with floats fighter aircraft (February 1940 - June 1941)
- Vought Kingfisher I observation floatplane (July 1942 - October 1943)
- Vickers Wellington GR Mark XI anti-submarine aircraft (August 1944 - October 1945)
- Vickers Wellington T Mark XVII training aircraft with Air Intercept radar (December 1944 - October 1945)
- Vickers Wellington B Mark X medium bomber (July 1945 - April 1946)
- Fairey Firefly T.Mk 2 fighter and anti-submarine trainer aircraft (February 1955 - March 1957)
- Fairey Firefly T.Mk 7 fighter and anti-submarine trainer aircraft (February 1955 - November 1956)
- Airspeed Oxford II trainer aircraft (May 1955 - February 1957)
- Boulton Paul Sea Balliol T.Mk 21 advanced trainer aircraft (February 1957 - March 1957)
- de Havilland Sea Devon C Mk 20 transport and communications aircraft (February 1957 - March 1957)

== Naval air stations / Royal Air Force stations ==
765 Naval Air Squadron operated from a number of naval air stations of the Royal Navy, in Scotland and England and a number of Royal Air Force stations in England:

Airbase	From	To
Royal Naval Air Station Lee-on-Solent (HMS Daedalus)	24 May 1939	26 August 1940
Royal Naval Air Station Sandbanks (HMS Daedalus II)	26 August 1940	25 October 1943
disbanded	25 October 1943	
Royal Naval Air Station Charlton Horethorne (HMS Heron II)	10 February 1944	18 March 1944
Royal Naval Air Station Lee-on-Solent (HMS Daedalus)	18 March 1944	18 April 1944
Royal Naval Air Station Worthy Down (HMS Kestrel)	18 April 1944	31 May 1944
Royal Naval Air Station Stretton (HMS Blackcap)	31 May 1944	1 August 1944
Royal Naval Air Station Lee-on-Solent (HMS Daedalus)	1 August 1944	30 September 1944
Royal Naval Air Station Twatt (HMS Tern)	30 September 1944	10 October 1944
Royal Air Force Eastchurch	10 October 1944	14 November 1944
Royal Air Force Hornchurch	14 November 1944	14 June 1944
Royal Air Force Manston	14 June 1945	6 October 1945
Royal Naval Air Station Hal Far (HMS Falcon)	6 October 1945	23 April 1946
disbanded	30 April 1946	
Royal Naval Air Station Culdrose (HMS Seahawk)	14 February 1955	25 March 1957
disbanded	25 March 1957	

== Commanding officers ==
List of commanding officers of 765 Naval Air Squadron with date of appointment:

1939 - 1943

- Lieutenant Commander H.C. Ranald, RN, from 24 May 1939
- Lieutenant Commander(A) H.L. McCulloch, RN, from 8 April 1940
- Lieutenant Commander(A) J.B. Wilson, RN, from 12 July 1940
- Lieutenant Commander G.R. Brown, RN, from 21 April 1941
- Lieutenant J.L.W.M. Allison, RN, from 27 August 1942
- Lieutenant Commander(A) L.D. Goldsmith, RNVR, from 11 January 1943
- disbanded - 25 October 1943

1944 - 1946

- Lieutenant(A) D.H. Coates, RNVR, from 10 February 1944
- Lieutenant(A) S.C. Abel, RNVR, from 14 August 1945
- Lieutenant(A) H.E. Rumble, RNVR, from 4 February 1946
- disbanded - 30 April 1946

1955 - 1957

- Lieutenant Commander J.I. Baker, RN, from 14 February 1955
- Lieutenant Commander D.W. Winterton, RN, from 15 December 1955
- Lieutenant Commander W.H. Gunner, RN, from 8 March 1957
- disbanded - 25 March 1957

Note: Abbreviation (A) signifies Air Branch of the RN or RNVR.
