= HMS Landrail =

Five ships and two air stations of the Royal Navy have borne the name HMS Landrail, another name for the bird more commonly named a corn crake:

- HMS Landrail (1806) was a 4-gun schooner launched in 1806 and sold around 1816.
- HMS Landrail (1855) was a wood paddle tug, previously in civilian service as Gipsy King. She was purchased in 1855 and sold in 1856.
- HMS Landrail (1860) was a Philomel-class wood screw gunvessel launched in 1860 and sold into civilian service in 1869, being renamed Walrus. She was wrecked in October 1876
- HMS Landrail (1886) was a Curlew-class torpedo gunvessel launched in 1886 and sunk as a target in 1906.
- HMS Landrail (1914) was a Laforey-class destroyer launched in 1914. She was to have been named HMS Hotspur, but was renamed in 1913. She was sold in 1921.
- HMS Landrail (1940 shore establishment) was the stone frigate RNAS Campbeltown in 1941.
- HMS Landrail (1941 shore establishment) was RNAS Machrihanish, in commission between 1941 and 1946 and later 1951 to 1952.
- HMS Landrail II (shore establishment) was the stone frigate RNAS Campbeltown between 1941 and 1945.
