= HMS Flycatcher =

List of ships with the same or similar names

One ship and three shore establishments of the Royal Navy have borne the name HMS Flycatcher:

- HMS Flycatcher (1912) was an ex-Turkish motor patrol boat. Built in 1912 by Thornycroft, she was sunk on 9 November 1914 by HMS Espiegle in Shatt-al-Arab, salvaged, and returned to service late 1915, armed with 1 6-pounder gun and 1 machine gun. Sold c1923.
- HMS Flycatcher (shore establishment) was a stone frigate for the Royal Navy's headquarters for its Mobile Naval Air Bases which supported their Fleet Air Arm units. It was based first at RNAS Ludham, Norfolk, between 4 September 1944 and 16 February 1945. It then moved to RNAS Middle Wallop, Hampshire, on 16 February 1945 and remained until paying off on 10 April 1946.
- HMS Flycatcher (Hong Kong shore establishment) was recommissioned on 1 April 1947 for the Royal Navy presence located at RAF Kai Tak situated at Kai Tak Airport in Hong Kong, decommissioning on New Year's Eve of 1947.

== See also ==
- List of air stations of the Royal Navy
- List of Royal Navy shore establishments
