= HMS Daedalus =

Five ships and a number of shore establishments of the Royal Navy have borne the name HMS Daedalus, after the mythical Daedalus:

- HMS Daedalus (1780) was a 32-gun fifth rate frigate launched in 1780. She was lent to Trinity House between 1803 and 1806 as a hulk, and was broken up in 1811.
- HMS Daedalus (1811) was a 40-gun fifth rate, previously the Italian frigate Corona. She was captured from the Italians in 1811 and was wrecked in 1813.
- HMS Daedalus (1826) was a 46-gun fifth rate launched in 1826. She was reduced to 20 guns in 1843 and became a Royal Naval Reserve drill ship in 1862. She was sold in 1911.
- HMS Daedalus was an iron screw floating battery launched in 1856 as HMS Thunderbolt. Converted to a floating pierhead in 1873, she bore the name HMS Daedalus between 1916 and 1919 whilst serving as the nominal depot ship of the Royal Naval Air Service. Personnel of Royal Naval Air Service Training Establishment, Cranwell were held against HMS Daedalus (see Royal Air Force College Cranwell#History. The vessel was sunk in 1948 when a tug collided with her, and raised the following year to be broken up.
- HMS Daedalus was to have been a Danae-class light cruiser. She was ordered in 1918, but cancelled later that year.
- HMS Daedalus (shore establishment) was a naval air station, RNAS Lee-on-Solent. The base was opened in 1917 and transferred to the RAF in 1918. It was returned to the successor of the Royal Naval Air Service, the Fleet Air Arm, in 1939. It and various out-stations bore the name HMS Daedalus between 1957 and 1996.
- HMS Daedalus II was a seaplane base and training establishment at several locations around the United Kingdom. Commissioned in 1940, the base was paid off in 1946.
- HMS Daedalus III was an accommodation and release centre at Lee on Solent and Bedhampton between 1943 and 1947.
