= SAS Wingfield =

South African Navy base in Cape Town

- Part of South African Navy
- Wingfield, Cape Town, Western Cape

Site information
- Type: Training base

Location
- Coordinates: 33°54′24.9″S 18°31′53.46″E

Site history
- Built: 1961

SAS Wingfield is a South African Navy base, on the site of the World War II Wingfield Aerodrome in Cape Town.

== History ==
SAS Wingfield was established in 1961 to provide technical training and practical instruction to apprentices, but now offers training to officers and sailors.
