= RAF Dounreay =

- IATA: none; ICAO: EGPY

Summary
- Airport type: Military
- Operator: RAF, Royal Navy
- Location: Dounreay
- In use: 1944–1954
- Elevation AMSL: 112 ft / 34 m
- Coordinates: 58°35′0″N 3°43′40″W

Map
- Location in Highland

Was an airfield in Dounreay, UK that opened in April 1944.

In 1955 the airfield was taken over by the United Kingdom Atomic Energy Authority (UKAEA) for developing a fast breeder reactor. One runway was kept operational until the 1990s for transport to/from the site.

== See also ==
- Dounreay
