= HMS Jackdaw =

Two ships of the Royal Navy have carried the name HMS Jackdaw:

- HMS Jackdaw (1806), a Cuckoo-class schooner sold in 1816
- HMS Jackdaw (1830), a schooner wrecked in 1835

Jackdaw has also been the name of a couple of naval shore establishments:

- HMS Jackdaw (shore establishment), a Royal Navy stone frigate, the Royal Naval Air Station at Crail, Fife, Scotland from 1940 to 1947
- HMS Jackdaw II, a stone frigate RNAS Dunino and a satellite airfield for RNAS Crail from 1942 to 1945.
