= HMS Sealion =

HMS Sealion was the name of several ships and at least one land base of the Royal Navy.

- HMS Sealion (72S) - an S-class submarine active during World War II
- HMS Sealion (S07) - a Porpoise-class submarine of the Cold War period
- The Royal Navy's name for RAF Ballykelly, Northern Ireland. The Joint Anti-submarine School was located there along with several Fleet Air Arm units.
