= RNAS Tresco =

Former Royal Naval Air Station

RNAS Tresco RAF Tresco
- Near Tresco, Isles of Scilly, Cornwall in England

Site information
- Type: Royal Naval Air Station
- Owner: Admiralty; Air Ministry
- Operator: Royal Navy; Royal Air Force

Location
- Shown within Cornwall RNAS Tresco (the United Kingdom)
- Coordinates: 49°57′12″N 6°20′17″W

Site history
- Built: 1917
- In use: 1917–1919

RNAS Tresco was a Royal Naval Air Service base on Tresco, the second largest island in the Isles of Scilly. From February 1917 to May 1919 aircraft patrolled the Western Approaches and provided an escort for convoys. A total of thirteen U-boats were sighted and nine attacked.

== History ==
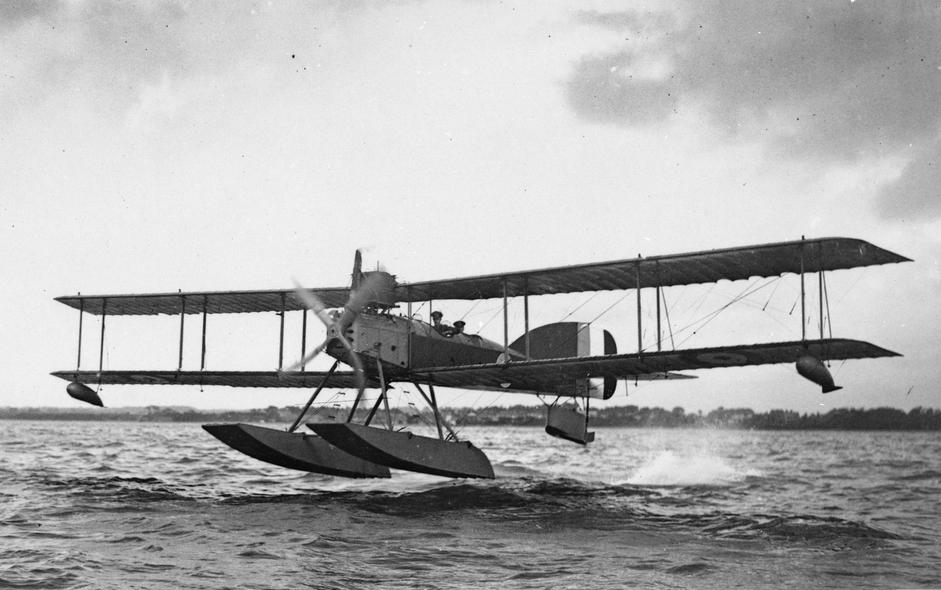
A Short Type 184 seaplane

Despite warnings from locals that the bay was too exposed for these relatively fragile machines, in January 1917 a handful of Short Type 184 seaplanes were stationed at Porthmellon on St Mary's. They were followed by several Curtiss Type 12 flying-boats from RNAS Cattewater near Plymouth. Before the base became operational it was transferred to Tresco, and formed RNAS Tresco at New Grimsby. The first patrol was undertaken on 28 February 1917 and the first conclusive action took place on 27 May 1917, when an unidentified U-boat was spotted, on the surface, off Bryher. Before diving the U-boat shot at, and holed the aircraft's radiator, which was temporary fixed by one of the crew climbing onto the wing and plugging the hole with a handkerchief! The flying boat dropped two bombs and onshore observers witnessed the submarine's stern rising out of the water at an angle of 60° before she sank. Subsequent research suggests that the U-boat may have survived the attack. The crew of the Curtiss Type 12 were later decorated.

By the summer, full facilities had been established and from August there were around 22 planes including Short Type 184 and Felixstowe F.5 flyingboats. The squadron patrolled the Western Approaches of the English Channel and gained two DSCs, one DSM and a CGM. A number of other significant actions followed, notably the thwarting of U-boat attacks on the White Star liner, Persic which sustained damage but managed to reach port

On 18 August 1918, the unit became No. 234 Squadron RAF (Royal Air Force) with Short Type 225 seaplanes. The last patrol was made on 10 November 1918, by which time all four Flights had been incorporated into the RAF as No. 234 Squadron RAF, before being disbanded in May 1919.

== Remains today ==
Some remains of RNAS Tresco are visible today, most prominently the ramp from the yard onto the beach. The site is now occupied by the appropriately named Flying Boat Club of the Tresco Estate.
