= No. 67 Group RAF =

No. 67 Group RAF No. 67 (Northern Ireland) Group No. 67 (Northern Ireland Reserve) Group (previously RAF Northern Ireland)
- Active: 1 April 1950 and 1 February 1957; 1 August 1940 - 31 March 1950
- Country: United Kingdom
- Branch: Royal Air Force
- Type: Group; Formerly a command
- Part of: RAF Home Command
- Last home: Edenmore, Whiteabbey, Belfast. Edenmore Hotel, Whiteabbey, Belfast as RAF NI

No. 67 Group RAF is a former Royal Air Force group which was active between 1 April 1950 and 1 February 1957. It was formerly RAF Northern Ireland (RAF NI) a former Royal Air Force command based in Northern Ireland, United Kingdom.

== Structure ==
No. 67 Group RAF was formed on 1 April 1950 at RAF Aldergrove as No. 67 (Northern Ireland Reserve) Group RAF, it then moved to Edenmoor Hotel, Whiteabbey, Belfast on 16 June 1950. The group was renamed to No. 67 (Northern Ireland) Group on 1 August 1950 and disbanded on 1 February 1957 into No. 64 Group RAF.

RAF Northern Ireland

RAF NI was formed on 1 August 1940 at Dunlambert Hotel, Fort William Park Belfast. On 15 October 1942 it absorbed No. 82 Group and created a HQ at Parliament Buildings, Stormont, Belfast. It moved to Wilmont & Ballydrain, Dunmurry on 4 January 1945, it absorbed No. 15 Group on 1 August 1945. During late 1948 it moved to Edenmore Hotel, Whiteabbey, Belfast while using RAF Aldergrove. It was disbanded on 31 March 1950.

No. 82 Group RAF (1941–42)

No. 82 (Fighter) Group was formed on 1 August 1941 at 63 Somerton Road, Belfast for the protection of Northern Ireland's Dockyards. On 13 September 1941 the group moved to the Parliament Buildings, Stormont, Belfast before being absorbed by RAF NI on 15 October 1942.

- 1 May 1942 - 82 Group, RAF Fighter Command
  - No. 25 Squadron RAF at RAF Ballyhalbert with the Bristol Beaufighter
  - No. 153 Squadron RAF at RAF Ballyhalbert with the Bristol Beaufighter
  - No. 152 Squadron RAF at RAF Eglinton with the Supermarine Spitfire
  - No. 504 Squadron RAF at RAF Kirkistown with the Supermarine Spitfire
- 1 March 1943 - 82 Group, RAF Fighter Command
  - No. 501 Squadron RAF at RAF Ballyhalbert with the Supermarine Spitfire

No. 15 Group RAF (1939–45)

No. 15 (General Reconnaissance) Group was reformed on 15 March 1939 at RAF Lee-on-Solent under RAF Coastal Command. It moved to Mount Wise Barracks, Plymouth on 7 June 1939, then to Egg Buckland Keep, Plymouth on 16 August 1940. It was then transferred to Derby House, Exchange Buildings, Liverpool on 28 February 1941, to be co-located with the Royal Navy's Commander-in-Chief, Western Approaches. Shortly afterwards on 9 April 1941 it took over control for all RAF units in Iceland. It was merged into RAF NI on 1 August 1945.

No. 61 Group RAF (1940)

No. 61 Group RAF was formed on 1 July 1940 at Aldergrove before moving on 7 July 1940 to Dunlambert Hotel, Fort William Park, Belfast. It was redesignated to RAF NI on 1 August 1940. It was reformed on 2 May 1946 and operated until 31 March 1959.

== Units controlled as RAF NI ==
- No. 201 Gliding School RAF
- No. 202 Gliding School RAF
- No. 203 Gliding School RAF

== Communication Flight ==
The RAF Northern Ireland Communication Flight was formed during October 1940 at RAF Sydenham, using Percival Vega Gull's, Percival Proctor's, Avro Tutor's and Miles Master's. It moved to RAF Newtownards during October 1942 then to RAF Ballyhalbert in February 1944, then back to Newtownards in May 1944, then back to Sydenham during early 1945. During September 1945 the flight moved to RAF Long Kesh, then it moved back to Sydenham on 3 December 1945. It moved to RAF Aldergrove on 1 December 1946 before disbanded there on 31 March 1950.

The RAF NI flight also used de Havilland Dominies, Avro Ansons Supermarine Sea Otter and Airspeed Oxfords.

No. 15 Group Communication Flight was formed at RAF Roborough on 13 June 1939, it moved to RAF Hooton Park on 1 February 1941 and was disbanded on 1 August 1945. It operated Airspeed Envoys, Hawker Hart, Supermarine Walrus, de Havilland Hornet Moth, and Gloster Gladiators.

No. 82 Group Communication Flight was formed during September 1941 at RAF Ballyhalbert, on 5 January 1942 it moved to RAF Newtownards and was disbanded into the RAF NI Communication Flight on 7 June 1943, it operated de Havilland Tiger Moths, Master's, Miles Mentor's and Westland Lysander's.

The flight became No. 67 Group Communication Flight at RAF Aldergrove on 1 April 1950 and was disbanded during January 1957, it used Avro Ansons and Supermarine Spitfires.

== Air Officers Commanding No. 67 Group ==
- 1 Mar 1950 A/Cdre B V Reynolds
- 19 Apr 1950 A/Cdre N A P Pritchett
- 20 Aug 1951 A/Cdre H G J E Proud
- 25 Oct 1954 A/Cdre G W Hayes

== See also ==
- List of Royal Air Force groups
- List of Royal Air Force commands
