= RAF Ludham =

Former Royal Air Force station in Norfolk, England

RAF Ludham USAAF Station 177 RNAS Ludham HMS Flycatcher
- Ludham Aerodrome
- Ludham, Norfolk in England

Site information
- Type: Royal Air Force station
- Code: LU
- Owner: Air Ministry; Admiralty
- Operator: Royal Air Force; Royal Navy
- Controlled by: RAF Fighter Command; 1941-43 & 1945 * No. 12 Group RAF; Air Ministry Works Department; 1943-44; Fleet Air Arm; 1944-45
- Condition: Limited flying

Location
- Shown within Norfolk RAF Ludham (the United Kingdom)
- Coordinates: 52°43′13″N 1°32′55″E

Site history
- Built: 1941
- Built by: Richard Costain Ltd
- In use: October 1941 - October 1945
- Fate: Civil Aviation / Farmland / Housing / Industry / Public road
- Battles/wars: European theatre of World War II

Airfield information
- Elevation: 12 metres (39 ft) AMSL
Runways
Direction	Length and surface
08/26	4,200 feet (1,280 m) Concrete/Tarmac
02/20	3,300 feet (1,006 m) Concrete/Tarmac
14/32	3,300 feet (1,006 m) Concrete/Tarmac

Royal Air Force Ludham or more simply RAF Ludham is a former Royal Air Force station located approximately 1 mile (1.6 km) northeast of the village of Ludham, and 16 miles (26 km) east-northeast of Norwich, in the county of Norfolk, England.

Although most of the airfield site has returned to agriculture, a small portion of the east–west runway is still used for private flying.

== History ==
The airfield at Ludham was built by Richard Costain Ltd and became operational in November 1941 as a second satellite for the main fighter station at RAF Coltishall sited north of Norwich, three tarmac-covered concrete runways and ancillary buildings being built on the land which had belonged to Fritton Farm. A total of ten RAF fighter squadrons (eight flying various marks of Supermarine Spitfire, and two flying the Hawker Typhoon 1B were based here between December 1941 and July 1945.

Fighter duties from Ludham were fairly regular and generally coastal and convoy patrols of little note, but the results of one sortie on 28 January 1943 by No. 167 Squadron RAF, whose Spitfires were scrambled to intercept and shoot down a German Junkers Ju 88 that was harassing shipping off the East coast, was witnessed by HM The King and Queen, who happened to be visiting the station that same afternoon.

Although allocated to the United States Army Air Forces (USAAF) as Station 177 in August 1943 no American units were based there and there was an uneventful period of little or no activity.

=== HMS Flycatcher ===
On 24 August 1944 it was transferred from No. 12 Group RAF to the Admiralty and known as Royal Naval Air Station Ludham, (or RNAS Ludham). Its primary function was a headquarters for the Mobile Naval Airfields Organisation (MNAO). It was also the Mobile Operational Naval Air Base (MONAB) Assembly Station and was able to provide accommodation for two MONABs.

RNAS Ludham was commissioned as HMS Flycatcher on 4 September under the command of Commander(A) J.B. Wilson, RN, Senior Officer Mobile Naval Airfields Organisation (SNOMNAO). Notably the airbase was not open for flying while in use by Royal Navy but here the first five MONABs and one Transportable Aircraft Maintenance Yard (TAMY) were assembled and despatched.

Captain L.J.S. Edes, RN, took command of RNAS Ludham and assumed the title SNOMNAO, on 1 November 1944. The airfield was quite a distance from the port of embarkation and had inferior road and rail links and the Air Ministry offered to swap RAF Middle Wallop for RNAS Ludham, and therefore HMS Flycatcher was "paid off" and RNAS Ludham closed on 16 February 1945. The commission transferred to RNAS Middle Wallop.

=== Return to the RAF and later use ===
The RAF then took back control of Ludham, when some limited detachments by fighter squadrons took place, but the site was eventually closed down in 1946. By 1961 the land had been re-acquired by local farmers with various buildings still remaining around the perimeter and, although most of the airfield site has returned to agriculture, there is a small hangar for private aircraft that use a small portion of the east–west runway for private flying.

== Based units ==
The following units were here at some point:

- No. 1 Squadron RAF
- No. 19 Squadron RAF
- No. 91 (Nigeria) Squadron RAF
- No. 167 (Gold Coast) Squadron RAF
- No. 195 Squadron RAF
- No. 602 (City of Glasgow) Squadron AAF
- No. 603 (City of Edinburgh) Squadron AAF
- No. 610 (County of Chester) Squadron AAF
- No. 611 (West Lancashire) Squadron AAF
- No. 1489 (Fighter) Gunnery Flight RAF
- No. 2819 Squadron RAF Regiment
- No. 2893 Squadron RAF Regiment
