= HMS Saker =

Stone frigate for Royal Navy personnel serving in the United States of America

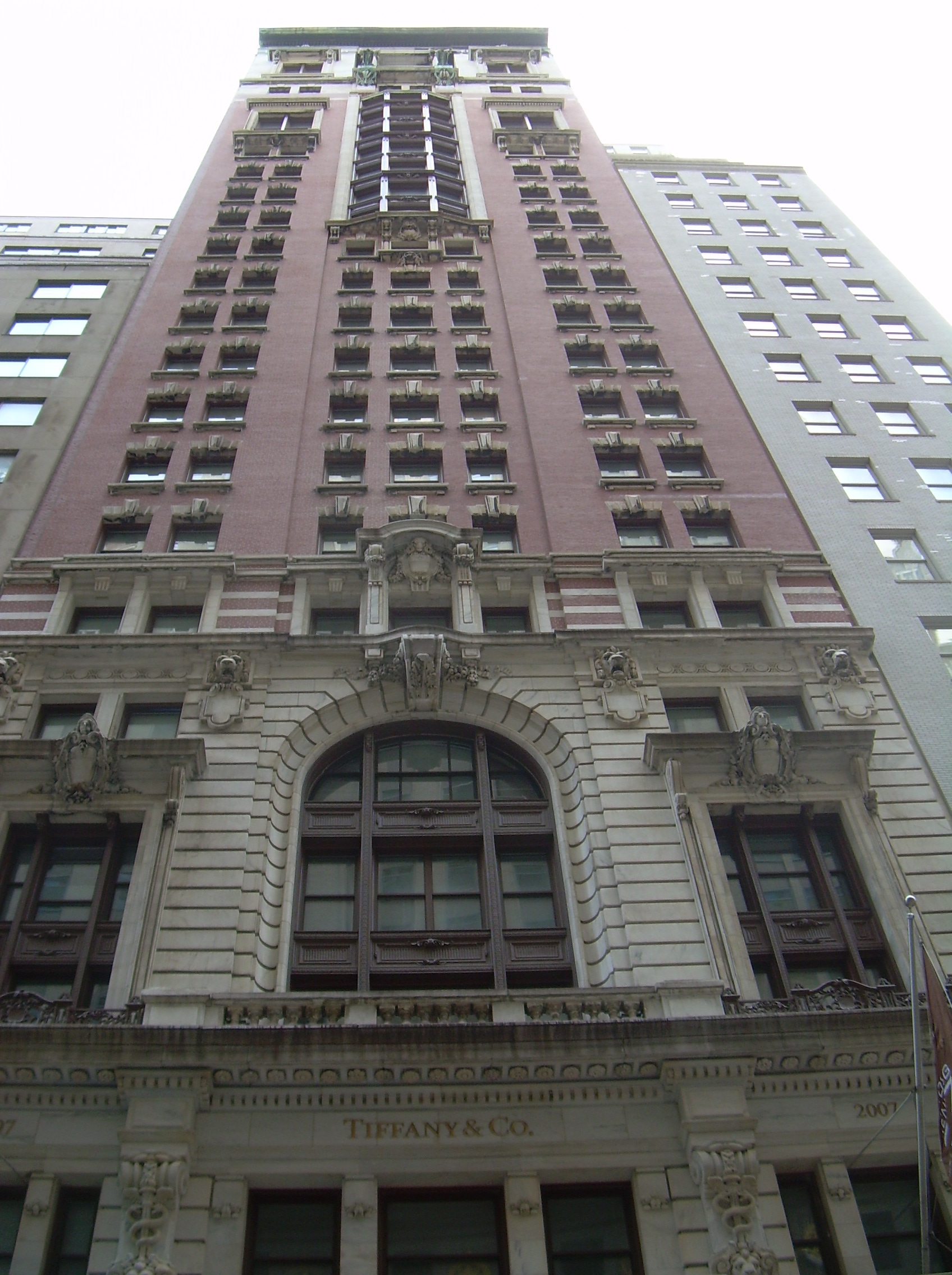
- 37 Wall Street, the location of Saker for a short period

History

United Kingdom
- Name: HMS Saker
- Namesake: Saker falcon
- Commissioned: 1 November 1942

General characteristics
- Type: Stone frigate

HMS Saker, also known as HMS Saker I, HMS Saker II and HMS Saker III, has historically been the ship to which Royal Naval personnel serving in the United States of America are assigned. Consequently, it is a stone frigate, and has existed at several locations since the Second World War.

The first mention of the ship is at Dartmouth, Nova Scotia, as a Royal Naval Air Station. Before the war, it was a Royal Canadian Air Force station known as HMS Canada. It was commissioned under the name Saker (or possibly Saker II) on 1 October 1941, and paid off on 1 August 1942, being relieved by HMS Canada once more.

Saker II was commissioned as an accounting base at Connecticut Avenue in Washington D.C., on 1 December 1941, and became Saker on 1 November 1942. It had a satellite unit, known originally as HMS Asbury, which acted as shore based transit accommodation of the Royal Navy located just outside New York City. It was used by crews picking up ships allocated to the Royal Navy under the provisions of Lend-Lease and by crews sent to collect ships that had been undergoing long term repair, refitting or construction at United States dockyards, and was also used as a base for 'unattached' personnel.

In 1943 it was recorded at Lewiston, Maine, where until 1945 it used the facilities at Naval Auxiliary Air Facility Lewiston for operations. From September 1943 through to July 1944, Saker was also used as the name for British personnel at NAS Squantum, and as the name for personnel at NAS Brunswick from August 1943 to August 1945.

The Chaplain of Saker in 1945 was K. Boulton Jones, who performed an all-British memorial ceremony for President Roosevelt at St Mark's Church, Adelaide, Brooklyn, on 15 April of that year.

From October 1945, it was based in New York City - and in March 1946 moved to 37 Wall Street. In December 1946, it was combined with the British Admiralty Delegation to the US, and was moved to Washington, D.C., then Crystal City, Virginia. The last building known as Saker closed in 1976, and all the personnel moved back to Washington.

HMS Saker went on to become the collective title for Royal Navy personnel serving in the United States of America, the current commander of HMS Saker - technically Saker III is the Assistant Naval Attaché of the British Defence Staff – US at the British Embassy in Washington, D.C.

== See also ==
- List of Royal Navy shore establishments
