= HMS Goshawk =

Five ships and a shore establishment of the Royal Navy have borne the name HMS Goshawk, after the bird of prey, the goshawk. A sixth ship was renamed before being launched:

== Ships ==
- HMS Goshawk (1806) was a 16-gun brig-sloop launched in 1806 and wrecked in 1813.
- HMS Goshawk (1814) was an 18-gun brig-sloop launched in 1814 and shipped to Canada for completion. She was found to be unsuitable and was sold in 1815.
- HMS Goshawk was to have been a 12-gun brig-sloop but she was renamed HMS Nerbudda in 1845 before being launched in 1847.
- HMS Goshawk (1856) was an Albacore-class wooden screw gunboat launched in 1856 and broken up in 1869.
- HMS Goshawk (1872) was a composite screw gunboat launched in 1872. She was hulked in 1902 and sold c. 1906.
- HMS Goshawk (1911) was an Acheron-class destroyer launched in 1911 and sold in 1921.

== Shore establishment ==
- HMS Goshawk (shore establishment) was a Royal Naval Air Station at Trinidad, commissioned in 1940 and paid off in 1946. Also known as RNAS Piarco, it is now Piarco International Airport.
