= Chingford Aerodrome =

Royal Naval airfield in Essex, 1914–1920

Chingford Aerodrome or RNAS Chingford was a Royal Naval Air Service airfield in north-east London (then Essex), used in the First World War. It is now the site of the William Girling Reservoir.

It was in use from December 1914 (or earlier) until November 1920.
