= Solent Airport Daedalus =

- IATA: QKB; ICAO: EGHF

Summary
- Airport type: General Aviation
- Owner: Fareham Borough Council
- Operator: Regional & City Airports
- Serves: Fareham
- Location: Lee-on-the-Solent, Hampshire
- Built: 1917
- In use: 2015–current former military 1917–1996
- Elevation AMSL: 9 m (30 ft)
- Coordinates: 50°48′54″N 001°12′16″W
- Website: https://www.solentairport.co.uk/

Map
- Location in Hampshire

Runways
Direction	Length		Surface
Direction	ft	m	Surface
05/23	3,376	1,029	Asphalt
05R/23L	2,723	830	Grass

Solent Airport Daedalus is a general aviation airport in Hampshire, England.

== History ==
Between 1917 and 1996 the site was RNAS Lee-on-Solent (HMS Daedalus), a Royal Naval Air Station that trained crews and engineers as part of the Royal Navy's Fleet Air Arm and earlier as part of the Royal Air Force and Royal Flying Corps.

In 2003 it was the subject of much controversy over the proposal to use a small part of it as a refuge for asylum-seekers.

In March 2006 the site was split, with ownership of the central area including the runways transferred to the Maritime and Coastguard Agency (MCA) who have continued to use it as a base for their air sea rescue helicopters. Hampshire Constabulary's fixed wing aircraft also continued to use the airfield. The outlying areas, including the former accommodation and technical area and surrounding land, hangars, and dispersals, were transferred to the South East England Development Agency (SEEDA).

In April 2006, Gosport and Fareham Borough Councils issued a joint Planning Statement for Daedalus stating that "There should be provision of leisure and community facilities which could complement existing facilities to the benefit of local residents" and "Future development should seek to maximise the benefit of the existing runways for general and private aviation use."

In April/May 2006, whilst conducting repairs to the runway, building crews discovered a giant unexploded land mine over 60 feet long that had been placed underneath the runway in the 1940s to cripple the airfield's operational capabilities in the event of a German invasion. The bomb (along with 19 others subsequently discovered) was scheduled to be removed in September 2006. The work was completed on 24 October 2006.

During its RN ownership the airfield had been used for a variety of groups, including the Portsmouth Naval Gliding Club (PNGC). The Lee Bees Model Flying Club, The Tigers Children's Motorcycle Display Team and two flying schools, and a number of privately owned aircraft were based at the airfield. When the RN moved out in 1996, operational management of the airfield was taken over by Hampshire Police Air Support Unit (HPASU). This management continued until October 2010, with HPASU being tenants of the MCA, which is an Executive Agency of the Department for Transport. In October 2010 Hampshire Police Air Support Unit was closed and its tasks taken over by the newly formed South East Air Support Unit covering Hampshire, Sussex and Surrey from bases at RAF Odiham and Shoreham Airport.

On acquiring their land SEEDA stated "The lack of availability of serviced employment land and new business space has been identified as an important requirement in South Hampshire. Our intention is that development of the site will focus on new aviation and marine related businesses, exploiting access to the existing runways and the Solent. Plans are to create a quality business location that will attract inward investment and provide accommodation for start-up, growing and established businesses". Aviation-related businesses, including an aircraft maintenance organisation, a microlight aircraft manufacturer and a flying school, became tenants of SEEDA in 2006, as did the owners of around 50 aircraft based on the site.

The aerodrome is strategically important. The growth of commercial air transport at Southampton Airport some years ago left it with no capacity for general aviation (GA) aircraft. This leaves Lee-on-Solent as the only airfield in southern Hampshire with a hard runway available for general aviation, the nearest alternative in Hampshire being Farnborough Airfield.

On 18 October 2007, users were given 30 days notice by the Airfield Manager that the aerodrome would be closed to all existing users except MCA, HPASU and PNGC from 16 November 2007. The closure was successfully challenged by Lee Flying Association which worked with other agencies such as the Civil Aviation Authority and AOPA to develop new operating procedures, an Airfield Manual and an air-to-ground radio service and the airfield is now operating as a licensed general aviation airfield. In May 2008 the closure decision was reversed.

From 1 April 2011, the airfield was leased to the British aircraft manufacturer, Britten-Norman under its airfield operations subsidiary, Fly BN. Britten-Norman established corporate offices at the Daedalus Airfield site as well as a manufacturing base for its subsidiary Britten-Norman Aircraft and MRO facilities for two other subsidiaries, BN Defence and BN Aviation. In 2010 the Regional Development Agencies were abolished and ownership of the land owned by SEEDA was transferred to the Homes and Communities Agency Now managed by Fly BN on behalf of the airfield's new owner, the Homes and Communities Agency, the airfield was prepared for licensed operations.

In August 2011 the government announced that the airfield would host an enterprise zone named the Solent Enterprise Zone.

== Current use ==
In 2015 the area of land containing the runways and the surrounding land formerly owned by SEEDA, with the exception of the former technical area to the south of the operational airfield were acquired by Fareham Borough Council, who renamed the site "Solent Airport at Daedalus". The technical site remained in the ownership of HCA and is being developed for mixed industrial and residential use.

On 1 April 2015 the airfield owners, Fareham Borough Council, appointed Regional and City Airports Management on a 5-year contract to manage the airfield. New entrances have been constructed to eliminate the need for runway crossings by vehicles and redevelopment is underway. CEMAST (Centre of Engineering, Manufacturing and Advanced Skills Training), part of Fareham College is completed on previously undeveloped land in the south east corner of the airfield. Wartime Hangar A has been demolished to make way for a new Innovation Centre of business starter units to the south of the South Apron on the east side. The old MARTSU building together with hangars G, H, J, K, L M N and O have been demolished. This area is now known as Faraday Business Park and has been developed with new landside factory units that do not have access to the runway. Six new hangars (Nos 4-9) and a fuel farm have been built on the east side of the disused runway 17/35. The hangars are intended for corporate use and incorporate office space and domestic facilities. The former fire ground towards the north end of the old eastern taxiway has been developed as a new hangar complex with three hangars to the north (Nos 15, 16, 17) and two to the south (Nos 13 & 14) plus a facilities block and car park to the east. Hangars 13 and 14 are occupied by Bournemouth Avionics.

In September 2017 it was announced that Solent Airport (Daedalus) is to open up scheduled flights, with destinations possibly including Alderney, Cardiff, Swansea and Exeter. The Daily Echo reports that there may also be a small passenger terminal to accommodate the up to 20 seater planes. By 2021 this had not happened.

In May 2018, Portsmouth Naval Gliding Centre announced that it would not be remaining at the site after its eviction notice on 31 May 2018. The charity stated this was because the airfield owners, Fareham Borough Council, had been unable to offer them a viable replacement to their current hangar, Belman 4, from which they had been served eviction notice for. On 31 May 2018, exactly 69 years to the day of the centre's formation, the last 'pure' glider flight from Lee-on-the-Solent flew. The centre has resumed flying at Middle Wallop.

In 2021 the newly built IFA2 converter station came on stream. Built on land in the north-east part of the airfield and south of the extended runway centreline it links to the UK electricity grid at Chilling, near Warsash to the French electricity grid via a similar converter station at Tourbe in France. The converter station converts between alternating current used in the UK grid and direct current used for the cross-channel link. It is connected to the UK and French grids by cables running across the airfield and entering The Solent to the west.

Land to the south of the eastern end of northern boundary of the airfield has been converted to public open space and was due to open for public use in 2021 after delays caused by the Covid-19 pandemic.

As well as the Maritime and Coastguard Agency's search and rescue helicopters the airfield also houses a Coastguard Training Centre and a Driving Test Centre.

Fixed-base operators (FBO) at the airfield include:

- Bournemouth Avionics LTD
- BN Aviation
- Hampshire Aeroplane Club
- HM Coastguard Search and Rescue (flying the Leonardo AW189)
- Phoenix Aviation
- Solent Microlight Flying Group
- Spitfires.com - The Spitfire Academy Operates Supermarine Spitfire TR.9 SM520 (G-ILDA) on pleasure flights during the Spring and Autumn.

== Accidents and incidents ==
On 16 November 2024, the pilot of an Ikarus C42, from the flying school Phoenix Aviation, lost control while taxiing from the end of runway 05 to the general aviation ramp to park. It's estimated speed noted by air traffic control was quoted 'upwards of 25 knots'. After passing the 05 hold at A1, the aircraft swerved and dislodged a taxiway light on the right side (facing the ramp.) Damage to the aircraft included the nose wheel becoming completely detached from the aircraft. The higher strut structure on the wheel was also damaged severely. After the nose wheel became detached, the lower fuselage became scraped as well as the propeller becoming chipped. The taxiway was closed for a brief period and the airfield services moved the aircraft away from the active area, before moving it again the next day to the Phoenix hangar where it awaited repairs. An investigation by the airport manager in partnership with Regional and City Airports was conducted shortly after the incident. There was one occupant onboard; the pilot was not injured.

== See also ==
- Britten-Norman
- Hovercraft Museum - situated on the site
