= HMS Goldfinch =

Four ships of the Royal Navy and one shore establishment have borne the name HMS Goldfinch, probably after the bird the European goldfinch.

== Ships ==
- HMS Goldfinch (1808) was a 6-gun brig launched in 1808 that became a Post Office Packet Service packet, sailing out of Falmouth, Cornwall. She was sold in 1838.
- HMS Goldfinch (1856) was an Albacore-class wooden screw gunboat launched on 2 February 1856 and broken up 1869.
- HMS Goldfinch (1889) was a Redbreast-class composite gunboat launched in 1889 and sold in 1907.
- HMS Goldfinch (1910) was an Acorn-class destroyer launched in 1910. She was wrecked on Start Point, Sanday Island, Orkney on 18 February 1915, and subsequently broken for scrap in April 1919.

== Shore establishment ==
- HMS Goldfinch was the name given to Ta' Qali airfield in Malta when it was transferred to the Fleet Air Arm on 1 April 1945 for use as a Fleet Requirements Unit.
