= RNAS Campbeltown =

Former Royal Naval Air Station in Argyll and Bute, Scotland

RNAS Campbeltown HMS Landrail II
- Strath Aerodrome
- Campbeltown, Argyll and Bute in Scotland
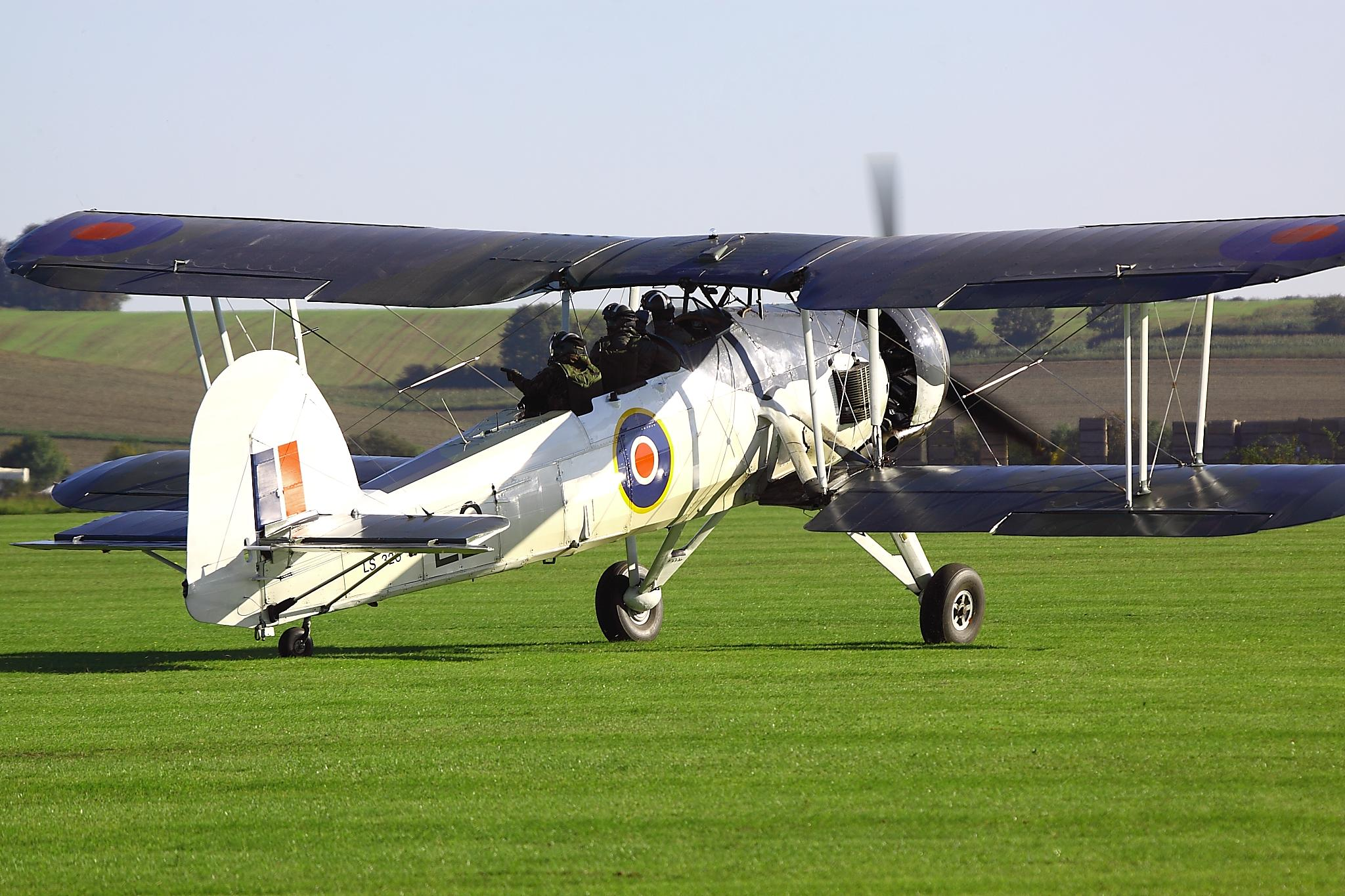
- Fairey Swordfish; an example of the type seen at RNAS Campbeltown

Site information
- Type: Naval Air Station
- Owner: Admiralty
- Operator: Royal Navy
- Controlled by: Fleet Air Arm
- Condition: Disused
- Function: Satellite to RNAS Donibristle, later became satellite to RNAS Machrihanish

Location
- Shown within Argyll and Bute RNAS Campbeltown (the United Kingdom)
- Coordinates: 55°25′10″N 005°40′05″W
- Grid reference: NR680205

Site history
- Built: 1916
- In use: 1940 - 1945
- Fate: Farmland
- Battles/wars: European theatre of World War II

Airfield information
- Elevation: 38 feet (12 m) AMSL
Runways
Direction	Length and surface
NNW/SSE	770 yards (704 m) Grass
ENE/WSW	850 yards (777 m) Grass
- Source: Royal Navy Research Archive

Royal Naval Air Station Campbeltown, commonly known as RNAS Campbeltown; (commissioned HMS Landrail II), was a Fleet Air Arm airfield located near Campbeltown on the Mull of Kintyre. Originally a small civilian airfield, it was requisitioned during the Second World War and used for naval aviation operations before being superseded by the nearby airfield at Machrihanish.

The site was used during both the First World War and the Second World War, initially as a Royal Air Force station and later as a Fleet Air Arm facility of the Royal Navy. During the Second World War it served as a satellite airfield to RNAS Machrihanish and was commissioned by the Royal Navy as HMS Landrail II.

== History ==
=== Early years ===
The airfield originally opened shortly before the end of the First World War under the name Machrihanish, distinct from the later and better-known nearby airfield of the same name.

From the summer of 1918 it became the air base for No. 272 Squadron RAF, which operated three flights: Nos. 531, 532 and 533 (Special Duty) and carried out maritime patrols over the approaches to the Firth of Clyde. The squadron remained at the airfield until it was disbanded in March 1919.

During the interwar years the site was also known as Strath or Strath Field. It saw limited civil aviation use beginning in 1933, when Midland and Scottish Air Ferries began operating services from the airfield. In 1934 the operations were taken over by Northern and Scottish Airways, later known as Scottish Airways, which provided air services linking Campbeltown with Glasgow and Islay.

It was situated a few miles west of Campbeltown on a narrow strip of relatively flat land bordered by high ground to the north and south. The surrounding terrain imposed significant limitations. Mountains rising to over 1,100 feet (335 m) lay within a short distance of the airfield, and the available landing area consisted of two short grass runways arranged in an L-shaped layout. These conditions restricted operations primarily to low-performance aircraft.

=== Second World War ===
The site was requisitioned by the Royal Navy in February 1940. Although improvements were made to infrastructure over the following years, the landing area itself remained largely unchanged. By 1944 the airfield had been equipped with four standard "squadron-type" hangars and seven double aircraft dispersal pens.

Civil air services continued to operate from the site for a period. In April 1941 the station was formally commissioned as HMS Landrail and began supporting Fleet Air Arm operations. A number of units visited the airfield on short-term detachments, operating aircraft such as the Fairey Swordfish torpedo bomber during the early years of the war.

Although its effectiveness in this role was limited by the site’s geographical constraints, a number of Fleet Air Arm units operated from the airfield on a temporary basis. Among the earliest were detachments from 816 Naval Air Squadron and 818 Naval Air Squadron in early 1940, both operating the Fairey Swordfish torpedo bomber. The Fairey Swordfish remained the most commonly used aircraft type at the station, despite challenging flying conditions caused by turbulent օդ flows from the surrounding terrain.

Infrastructure improvements were gradually introduced, and by 1944 several permanent hangars and aircraft dispersal areas had been constructed.

=== Relationship with Machrihanish ===
Although the surrounding area was considered suitable for aviation, the RNAS Campbeltown site itself proved less ideal than nearby locations. As a result, the neighbouring airfield at Machrihanish—often also referred to as Campbeltown—was developed in a more favourable position.

In June 1941, RNAS Machrihanish became the primary station commissioned as HMS Landrail, while RNAS Campbeltown was recommissioned HMS Landrail II and functioned as a satellite airfield. The two sites were connected by road, allowing aircraft to be transferred between them. RNAS Campbeltown was often used to accommodate additional aircraft, particularly for storage purposes.

=== Associated facilities ===
A nearby bombing range at Balure supported training activities. The range was operated by members of the Women's Royal Naval Service (Wrens), who travelled daily from the airfield. Targets included an offshore rock known as Sgor Cainteach, with a wrecked cargo vessel added as an additional target in 1943.

=== Closure ===
HMS Landrail II was decommissioned and Campbeltown airfield closed in mid-1945 following the end of wartime operations. Little physical evidence of the station remains today, as the site has largely disappeared within the surrounding landscape.

In later years, the name "Campbeltown Airport" came to refer instead to the former Machrihanish airfield. This site, designated EGEC, continues to operate as a civilian airport under Highlands and Islands Airports Limited. It features a single main runway (11/29) measuring approximately 3,049 metres, with a passenger terminal located on the eastern side of the airfield.

== Units ==
A number of units were here at some point:

- No. 272 Squadron RAF
- No. 531 (Special Duty) Flight RAF
- No. 532 (Special Duty) Flight RAF
- No. 533 (Special Duty) Flight RAF
- 766 Naval Air Squadron
- 772 Naval Air Squadron
- 804 Naval Air Squadron
- 810 Naval Air Squadron
- 812 Naval Air Squadron
- 815 Naval Air Squadron
- 816 Naval Air Squadron
- 818 Naval Air Squadron
- 820 Naval Air Squadron
- 825 Naval Air Squadron
- 826 Naval Air Squadron
- 828 Naval Air Squadron
- 829 Naval Air Squadron
- 837 Naval Air Squadron
