= RAF Ballyhalbert =

Former Royal Air Force station in Northern Ireland

RAF Ballyhalbert RNAS Ballyhalbert HMS Corncrake
- Near Ballyhalbert, County Down in Northern Ireland
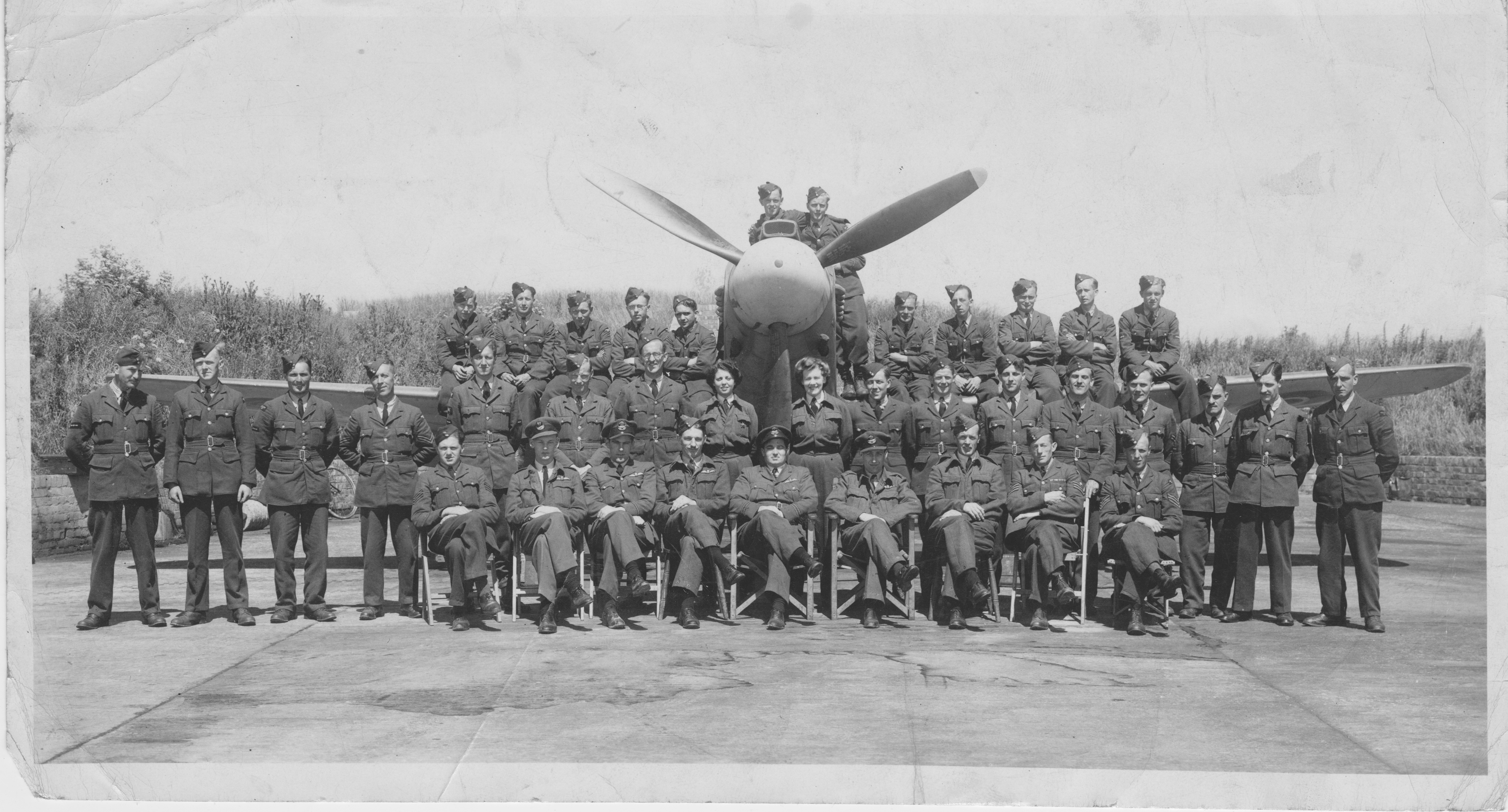
- Squadron photo taken on RAF Ballyhalbert in 1945

Site information
- Type: Royal Air Force sector station
- Code: YB
- Owner: Air Ministry; Admiralty
- Operator: Royal Air Force; Royal Navy
- Controlled by: RAF Fighter Command; 1941-45 * No. 13 Group RAF * No. 82 Group RAF; Fleet Air Arm; 1945-46
- Condition: Disused

Location
- Shown within Northern Ireland RAF Ballyhalbert (the United Kingdom)
- Coordinates: 54°29′50″N 5°28′14″W

Site history
- Built: 1940
- In use: June 1941 – 1946
- Fate: Housing / Leisure
- Battles/wars: European theatre of World War II

Airfield information
- Elevation: 26 feet (8 m) AMSL
Runways
Direction	Length and surface
00/00	Tarmac
00/00	Tarmac
00/00	Tarmac

Royal Air Force Ballyhalbert or more simply RAF Ballyhalbert is a former Royal Air Force sector station at Ballyhalbert on the Ards Peninsula, County Down, Northern Ireland.

RAF Kirkistown was a satellite to the larger Ballyhalbert.

Construction began in 1940.

== History ==
=== Royal Air Force use ===
It opened provisionally in May 1941, prior to completion of the works, as a RAF Fighter Command base where the primary weapon was the Supermarine Spitfire, and officially on 28 June of that same year. The base provided local protection from Luftwaffe raids on Belfast and the rest of the province. Other aircraft operated from the base were the Hawker Hurricane, Bristol Beaufighter, North American Mustang and Boulton Paul Defiant night fighter. During its lifetime, Ballyhalbert was home to RAF, Women's Auxiliary Air Force (WAAF), British Army, Royal Navy and United States Army Air Forces (USAAF) personnel. Servicemen from Australia, New Zealand, Canada and Poland also saw duty at Ballyhalbert.

Squadrons

- No. 25 Squadron RAF
- No. 26 Squadron RAF
- No. 63 Squadron RAF
- No. 125 (Newfoundland) Squadron RAF
- No. 130 (Punjab) Squadron RAF
- No. 153 Squadron RAF
- No. 245 (Northern Rhodesian) Squadron RAF
- No. 256 Squadron RAF
- No. 303 Squadron RAF
- No. 315 Polish Fighter Squadron
- No. 501 Squadron RAF (1942-43)
- No. 504 Squadron RAF (1942)

Units

- Detachment of No. 13 Group Anti-Aircraft Co-operation Flight RAF (May – August 1941)
- No. 82 Group Communication Flight RAF (September 1941 – January 1942)
- No. 82 Group Training Flight RAF became No. 1493 (Target Towing) Flight RAF (October 1941 – January 1942 & January – April 1943)
- No. 1402 (Meteorological) Flight RAF (December 1944 – August 1945)
- No. 1480 (Anti-Aircraft Co-operation) Flight RAF (November – December 1941)
- No. 1494 (Target Towing) Flight RAF (April 1943 – March 1945)
- No. 2707 Squadron RAF Regiment

=== Royal Navy ===
In 1942, a request for lodger facilities and a Royal Naval Air Section at RAF Ballyhalbert was granted by RAF Northern Ireland. On 14 July 1945 the airbase was transferred by RAF Northern Ireland on loan to the Admiralty and known as Royal Naval Air Station Ballyhalbert (RNAS Ballyhalbert). On 17 July it was commissioned as HMS Corncrake with Captain G.N.P. Stringer as commanding officer.

During its brief time as HMS Corncrake, the airbase served the Fleet Air Arm by supporting disembarked squadrons preparing for aircraft carrier operations. Additionally, it hosted the No. 4 Naval Fighter School (718 Squadron) and the No. 1 Hellcat Servicing Unit. The airbase was decommissioned on 14 November and subsequently placed under Care and Maintenance, on the books of HMS Gadwall. It was later returned to the control of RAF Northern Ireland on 24 January 1946.

Squadrons

- 718 Naval Air Squadron
- 725 Naval Air Squadron
- 768 Naval Air Squadron
- 784 Naval Air Squadron
- 787 Naval Air Squadron
- 800 Naval Air Squadron
- 808 Naval Air Squadron
- 812 Naval Air Squadron
- 827 Naval Air Squadron
- 880 Naval Air Squadron
- 882 Naval Air Squadron
- 885 Naval Air Squadron
- 887 Naval Air Squadron
- 894 Naval Air Squadron
- 899 Naval Air Squadron
- 1840 Naval Air Squadron
- 1846 Naval Air Squadron

Units

- 3rd Naval Fighter Wing

=== Present day ===
By 1947, with no further use made of the site it was abandoned. The airfield was sold to developers in March 1960, and is in use for several popular caravan parks.

== See also ==
- List of former Royal Air Force stations
