= RAF Kirkistown =

Former Royal Air Force station in Northern Ireland

RAF Kirkistown RNAS Kirkistown (HMS Corncrake II)
- Portavogie, County Down in Northern Ireland
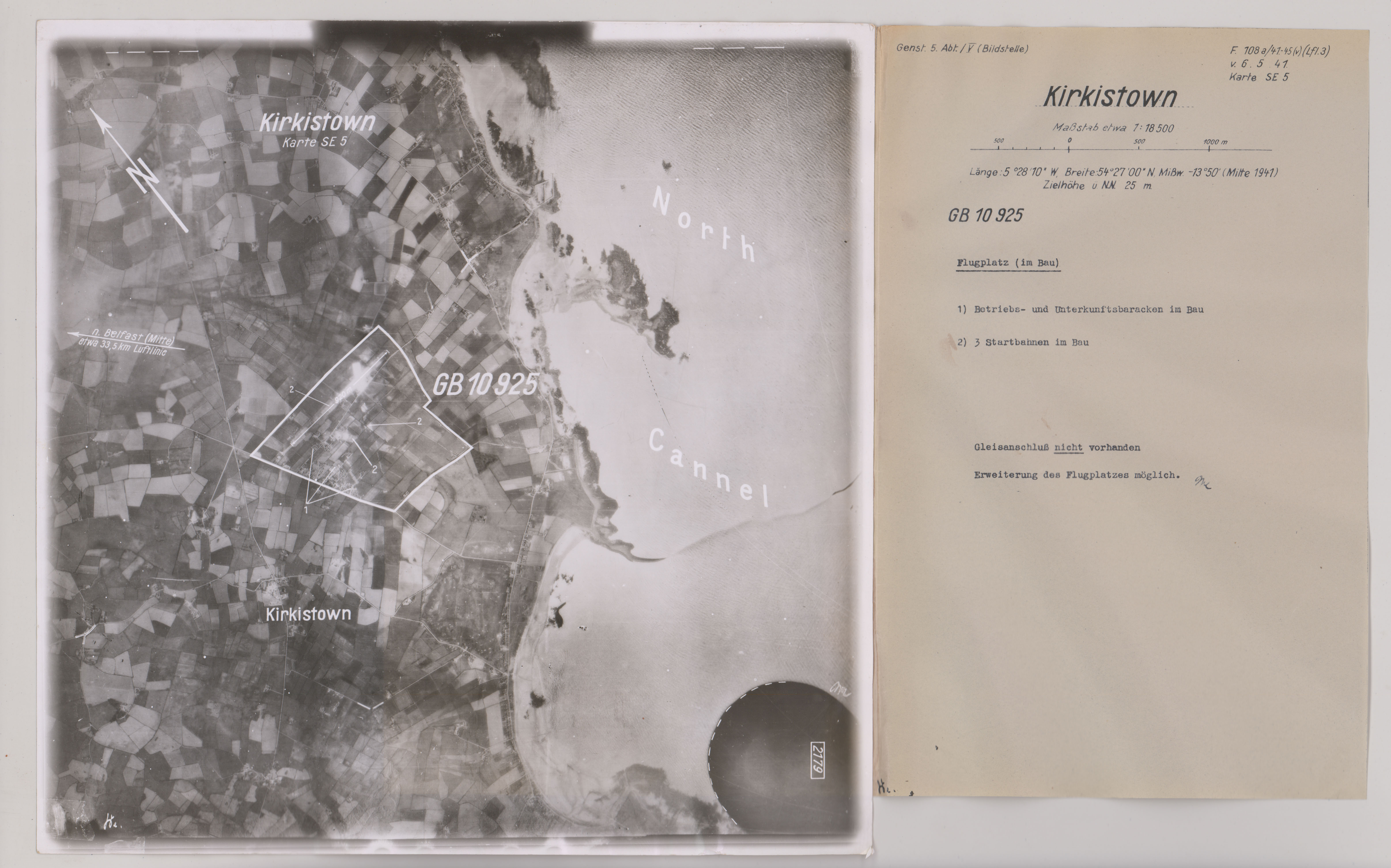
- RAF Kirkistown on a target dossier of the German Luftwaffe, 1941

Site information
- Type: Royal Air Force satellite station
- Code: IK
- Owner: Air Ministry; Admiralty
- Operator: Royal Air Force; Royal Navy
- Controlled by: RAF Fighter Command 1941-44; RAF Northern Ireland 1944-45; Fleet Air Arm 1945-46

Location
- Shown within Northern Ireland RAF Kirkistown (the United Kingdom)
- Coordinates: 54°27′18″N 005°27′57″W

Site history
- Built: 1940/41
- In use: July 1941 – 1952
- Battles/wars: European theatre of World War II

Airfield information
- Elevation: 6 metres (20 ft) AMSL
Runways
| Direction | Length and surface |
|---|---|
| 00/00 | Tarmac |
| 00/00 | Tarmac |
| 00/00 | Tarmac |

Royal Air Force Kirkistown or more simply RAF Kirkistown is a former Royal Air Force satellite station located 6.3 miles (10.1 km) of Ballyhalbert, County Down, Northern Ireland.

It was a satellite to the RAF Fighter Command airfield at Ballyhalbert on the Ards Peninsula.

In 1945, Ballyhalbert Airfield was designated a Royal Naval Air Station, commissioned as HMS Corncrake, and Kirkistown Airfield was commissioned as HMS Corncrake II.

== History ==
RAF Ballyhalbert opened officially on 28 June 1941 and the Kirkistown satellite airfield opened in July 1941. On 22 January 1942, No. 504 Squadron RAF moved to Kirkistown. The following units were here at some point:

- No. 485 Squadron RNZAF (1942)
- No. 1493 (Target Towing) Flight RAF (April – May 1942) became No. 1493 (Fighter) Gunnery Flight RAF (May – November 1942)
- No. 2898 Squadron RAF Regiment
- No. 4117 Anti-Aircraft Flight RAF Regiment

=== Royal Navy ===
Having initially been granted Lodger facilities for Royal Navy squadrons at the RAF Station, it was transferred to the Admiralty from RAF Northern Ireland on loan on 14 July 1945. Known as Royal Naval Air Station Kirkistown, or more commonly RNAS Kirkistown. It was used as a satellite airfield to RNAS Ballyhalbert.

During the middle of the Second World War, several Fleet Air Arm squadrons had been temporarily stationed at the site. 887 Naval Air Squadron, a Fleet fighter squadron equipped with Fairey Fulmar Mk.II fighter and reconnaissance aircraft, arrived from RAF Ballyhalbert on 4 November 1942. On 19 November 1942, 'B' Flight of 881 Naval Air Squadron, a single-seat fighter unit equipped with Grumman Martlet Mk IV fighter aircraft, transferred from RNAS Donibristle, Fife, Scotland.

Meanwhile, 818 Naval Air Squadron, a torpedo, bomber, and reconnaissance squadron equipped with six Fairey Swordfish I torpedo bombers, was stationed at the airfield from 2 December to 18 December 1942, having arrived from RNAS Machrihanish, Argyll and Bute, Scotland. Shortly after its departure, 835 Naval Air Squadron, another torpedo, bomber, and reconnaissance unit equipped with four Fairey Swordfish II aircraft, arrived from RNAS Machrihanish on 18 December 1942.

'B' Flight 881 Squadron and 887 Squadron departed the following day, 887 relocating to RNAS Lee-on-Solent, Hampshire, England and the flight returned to RNAS Donibristle, although subsequently redeploying to the airfield again on 30 December 1942 before finally departing back to RNAS Donibristle on 4 January 1943. 835 remained until returning to RNAS Machrihanish on 29 January 1943.

Later in the war, training activities took place when 885 Naval Air Squadron, a single-seat fighter squadron based at RNAS Ballyhalbert and equipped with Supermarine Seafire L Mk.III fighter aircraft, conducted Aerodrome Dummy Deck Landings at the airfield on 21 August 1944. In October 1944, 808 Naval Air Squadron, a single-seat fighter squadron based at RNAS Ballyhalbert and equipped with Grumman Hellcat F. Mk. I and F. Mk. II aircraft, also carried out Aerodrome Dummy Deck Landing exercises on 21 October 1944.

It commissioned on 17 July 1945 as HMS Cornrake II under the command of Captain G.N.P. Stringer, RN. Four months later it decommissioned to Care & Maintenance status on 14 November, on the books of HMS Gadwall. The airbase returned to RAF Northern Ireland control on 15 January 1946.

== Current use ==
Today the site is home to Kirkistown Circuit, a regular venue for car and motorcycle races. The circuit utilises the northern parts of the former air base's runways and perimeter roadways.

== See also ==
- List of former Royal Air Force stations
