= HMS Daedalus II =

Former Royal Naval Air Stations

History

United Kingdom
- Name: HMS Daedalus II
- Acquired: 1940
- Commissioned: 15 May 1940
- Decommissioned: 31 January 1946
- Type: Naval Air Station; Aircraft Training Establishment

HMS Daedalus II was a Royal Navy air station and training establishment between 1940 and 1946. The name applied to four different locations with the United Kingdom at various times during the Second World War. The establishment was formed to free up space at RNAS Lee-on-Solent (HMS Daedalus).

The first location was the former Royal Air Force (RAF) station at Lympne Airport. This was taken over by the Royal Navy in July 1939 and commissioned as HMS Buzzard as an air station, known as RNAS Lympne, to house disembarked Fleet Air Arm squadrons and for use as a training establishment for mechanics from HMS Daedalus. It was later known as RNATE Lympne and recommissioned as HMS Daedalus II in January 1940. The Aircraft Training Establishment had barely established itself when the events transpiring in France began to affect the airbase; in the spring of 1940, German troops advanced while the allied forces were in complete retreat. The station was reopened as an emergency landing site to accommodate aircraft evacuating from France. It became evident to both the Admiralty and the Air Ministry that Lympne was no longer secure for Fleet Air Arm operations and would soon be required to assist in the defense of Southern England. Consequently, Lympne was transferred back to the RAF on 24 May 1940, for utilisation by No. 11 Group RAF.

As the airfield in Kent was being transferred back to the RAF an air-sea rescue seaplane base and aircrew training centre was established at the Royal Motor Yacht Club at Sandbanks in Dorset and this base was formally commissioned as HMS Daedalus II on 15 May 1940. 764 & 765 Naval Air Squadrons (NAS) were based there with their Supermarine Walrus, Fairey Swordfish and Fairey Seafox aircraft. This station was also known as RNAS Sandbanks. Concurrently the training establishment formerly at Lympne was moved to Clayton Hall, Newcastle-under-Lyme as a base to train artificers but also retained the name Daedalus II.

In 1942 an outstation of the Sandbanks base was opened at RNAS Lawrenny Ferry in Pembrokeshire and 764 NAS was moved there as an operational conversion unit. 764 NAS remained at Lawrenny Ferry until October 1943 when the squadron was disbanded and the base reduced to care and maintenance status.

Sandbanks was also reduced to care and maintenance status in October 1943 and 765 NAS was also disbanded. The base at Sandbanks later became part of the landing craft base HMS Turtle.

By Christmas 1943, Clayton Hall was the only remaining site of HMS Daedalus II and continued to train aircraft artificers throughout the war until January 1946 when HMS Daedalus II was decommissioned.

== In popular culture ==
HMS Daedalus II features as a level within the game WW2 Rebuilder under its original name, RAF Lympne. The player has to rebuild the damaged facility and convert it for civilian air ferry services.

== Bibliography ==
- Bebbington, Graham (2000). Ship without Water. Leek, Staffordshire: Churnet Valley Books. ISBN 978-1-897949-63-4.
- Warlow, Ben (2000). Shore Establishments of the Royal Navy. Liskeard, Cornwall: Maritime Books. ISBN 0-907771-73-4.
