= List of Royal Navy shore establishments =

This is a list of shore establishments (or stone frigates) of the Royal Navy and Corps of Royal Marines.

Map of Royal Navy shore establishments

== Current Royal Navy shore establishments ==
Royal Navy bases and establishments in the United Kingdom (Portsmouth establishments: HMS Collingwood, HMS Excellent, HMS Sultan, HMS Temeraire, Institute of Naval Medicine)
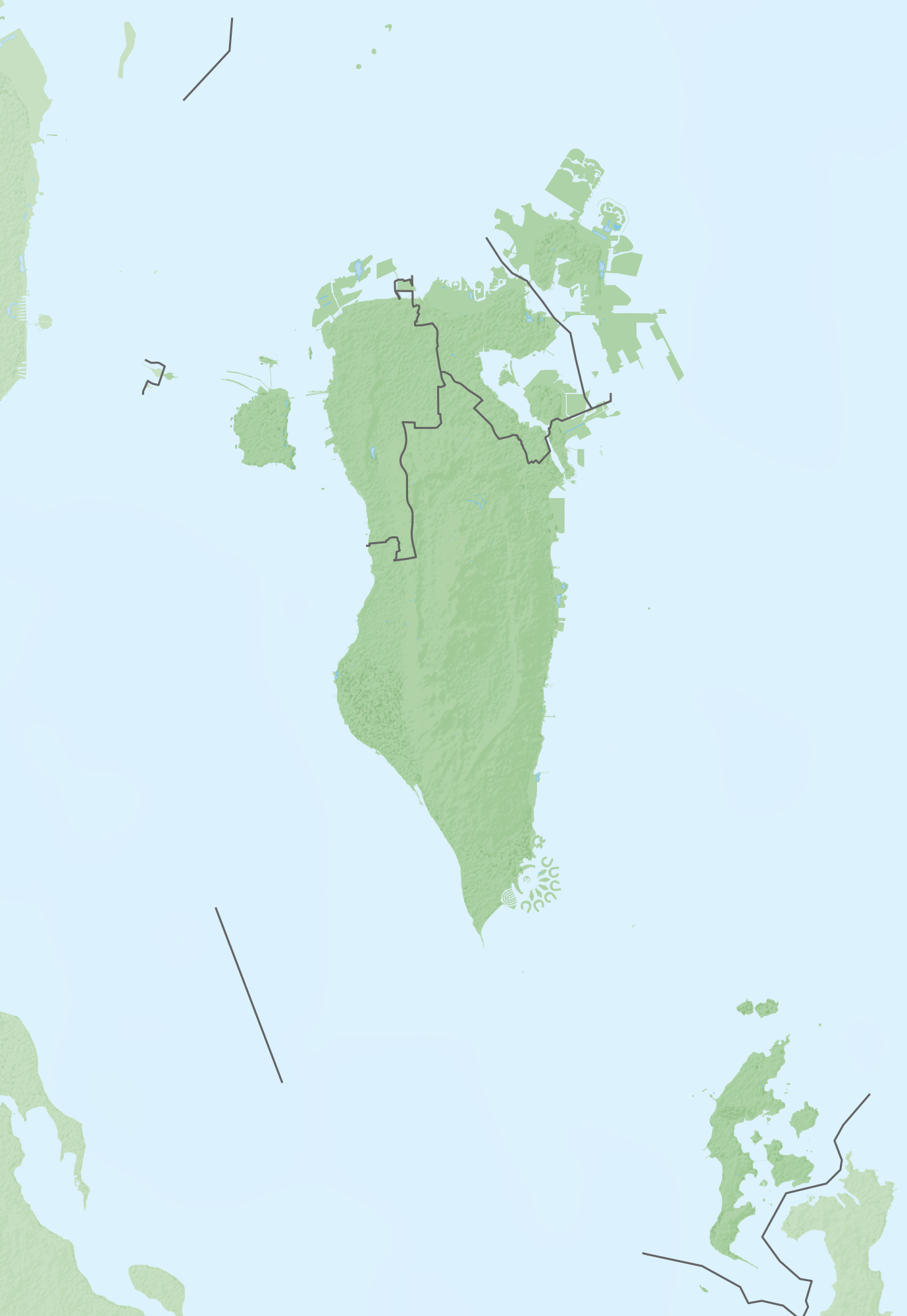
Royal Navy support facility in Bahrain
Mare Harbour, the base for Royal Navy vessels in the Falkland Islands & South Atlantic

=== Naval bases ===
- HMS Drake (HMNB Devonport, Devonport, Devon)
- HMS Nelson (HMNB Portsmouth, Portsmouth)
- HMS Neptune (HMNB Clyde, Faslane, Dunbartonshire)

=== Air stations ===
- HMS Seahawk (RNAS Culdrose, Cornwall)
  - RNAS Predannack
- HMS Heron (RNAS Yeovilton, Somerset)
  - RNAS Merryfield
- HMS Gannet (formerly known as RNAS Prestwick, South Ayrshire)

=== Training establishments ===
- HMS Collingwood (Fareham, Hampshire)
- HMS Dartmouth (Britannia Royal Naval College, Dartmouth, Devon)
  - Includes Hindostan as static training ship
- HMS Excellent (Whale Island, Portsmouth)
- HMS Raleigh (Torpoint, Cornwall)
  - Includes Brecon as static training ship
- HMS Sultan (Gosport, Hampshire)
- HMS Temeraire (Royal Navy School of Physical Training, Portsmouth)
- Defence Diving School (Horsea Island, Portsmouth)

=== Other ===
- HMS Caledonia, (Rosyth Dockyard, Fife)
- HMS Saker, Administrative aggregation of Royal Navy personnel based in the United States
- Institute of Naval Medicine (Alverstoke, Hampshire)
- Northwood Headquarters (Northwood, Hertfordshire, England), formerly HMS Warrior. Operational HQ for Commander Operations

=== Defence Munitions Centres ===
Formerly Royal Naval Armaments Depot and formally elements of Defence Equipment and Support.

- DM Beith
- RNAD Coulport
- DM Crombie
- DM Gosport

=== Testing establishments ===
- Vulcan Naval Reactor Test Establishment (HMS Vulcan) (Dounreay, Thurso, Caithness)
  - Currently being decommissioned, to be demolished by 2033

=== Overseas naval facilities ===
- United Kingdom Naval Support Facility, HMS Jufair (Mina Salman Port, Bahrain)
- East Cove Military Port (Mare Harbour, Falkland Islands)
- Port of Gibraltar (Gibraltar)
- UK Joint Logistics Support Base (Duqm, Oman)
- British Defence Singapore Support Unit (Sembawang, Singapore)
- Diego Garcia (British Indian Ocean Territory)

== Current Royal Marines establishments ==
Royal Marines Establishments - Green: RM Units, Blue: Royal Navy Establishments, Red: Training, Roundel: Fleet Air Arm station

=== Bases ===
- Commando Training Centre Royal Marines, Lympstone, Devon
- RM Stonehouse, Plymouth, Devon – Headquarters, UK Commando Force and 30 Commando (IX) Group
- RM Poole, Poole, Dorset – Special Boat Service and 148 (Meiktila) Commando Forward Observation Battery
- RM Condor, Arbroath, Angus – 45 Commando and 7 (Sphinx) Commando Battery
- RM Tamar, HMNB Devonport – 47 Commando (Raiding Group)
- RM Norton Manor, Taunton, Somerset – 40 Commando
- RM Bickleigh, Plymouth, Devon – 42 Commando
- RM Chivenor, Braunton, Devon – Commando Logistic Regiment and 24 Commando Royal Engineers
- RM Instow, Instow, Devon – 11 Amphibious Trials and Training Unit
- Camp Viking, Øverbygd, Norway – Arctic operations base for Littoral Response Group (North)

=== Significant RM presences are also located in ===
- HMNB Portsmouth
- HMNB Clyde – 43 Commando Fleet Protection Group
- MOD St Athan – A company sized contingent as part of SFSG
- RNAS Yeovilton – Commando Helicopter Force
- Bovington Camp – Viking Squadron
- Bardufoss Air Station – Commando Helicopter Force

=== Royal Marines Band Service ===
- HMS Nelson, HMNB Portsmouth – Band of HM Royal Marines School of Music
- HMS Raleigh – Band of HM Royal Marines Plymouth
- HMS Collingwood – Band of HM Royal Marines Collingwood
- MoD Caledonia – Band of HM Royal Marines Scotland
- Commando Training Centre Royal Marines – Band of HM Royal Marines Commando Training Centre

=== Royal Marines Reserve ===
- Royal Marines Reserve City of London, Wandsworth, London
  - Cambridge Detachment
  - Marlow Detachment
  - Portsmouth Detachment
- Royal Marines Reserve Bristol, Dorset House, Bristol
  - Lympstone Detachment
  - Plymouth Detachment
  - Poole Detachment
  - Cardiff Detachment
- Royal Marines Reserve Merseyside, Brunswick Dock, Liverpool
  - Birmingham Detachment
  - Leeds Detachment
  - Manchester Detachment
  - Nottingham Detachment
- Royal Marines Reserve Scotland, at HMS Caledonia, Rosyth Dockyard
  - Aberdeen Detachment
  - Dundee Detachment
  - Edinburgh Detachment
  - Glasgow Detachment
  - Belfast Detachment
  - Newcastle Detachment

== Current Royal Naval Reserve units and establishments ==
The modern Royal Naval Reserve has fifteen Units (with 3 satellite units). These are:

- HMS Calliope, Gateshead, Tyne & Wear, England
- HMS Cambria, Cardiff, Wales
  - Tawe Division (Swansea)
- HMS Ceres, Leeds, West Yorkshire, England
- HMS Dalriada, Glasgow, Scotland
- HMS Eaglet, Liverpool, England
- HMS Forward, Birmingham, England
- HMS Flying Fox, Bristol, England
- HMS Ferret, Chicksands, Bedfordshire, England
- HMS Hibernia, Lisburn, Northern Ireland
- HMS King Alfred, Whale Island, Portsmouth, Hampshire, England
- HMS President, by Tower Bridge, London, England
  - Medway Division (Rochester, Kent)
- HMS Scotia, Rosyth, Fife, Scotland (Within the grounds of HMS Caledonia)
  - Tay Division (Dundee)
- HMS Sherwood, Nottingham, England
- HMS Vivid, HMNB Devonport, Plymouth, Devon, England
- HMS Wildfire, Northwood, Middlesex, England

== Former shore establishments ==
=== Former Imperial fortresses ===
- Admiralty House, Bermuda, Royal Naval Dockyard Bermuda (and HM Naval Base Bermuda (HMS Malabar), Royal Naval Air Station Bermuda, HMCS Somers Isles
- Royal Navy Dockyard, Gibraltar, HMS Rooke
- Admiralty House, Halifax, Royal Naval Dockyard, Halifax
- Admiralty House, Valletta, HM Dockyard Malta

=== Former naval bases ===
- HMNB Rosyth, (Fife, UK)
- HMNB Chatham (Kent, UK)
- Woolwich Dockyard
- Deptford Dockyard
- Queenstown
- Portland Dockyard
- Scapa Flow
- Pembroke Dockyard
- Sheerness Dockyard
- Simon's Town Dockyard
- Sihanoukville Dockyard
- Trincomalee Dockyard
- Kingston Royal Naval Dockyard
- Amherstburg Royal Naval Dockyard
- Esquimalt Royal Navy Dockyard
- Penetanguishene Naval Yard
- Naval Shipyards, York (Upper Canada)

=== Former air stations ===
- HMS Ariel, RNAS Lee-on-Solent, Hampshire, England, 1959 - 1965 (also HMS Daedalus 1939-1960 and 1965-1996)
- HMS Asbury, RNAS Quonset Point, Rhode Island, USA, 1942-1944
- HMS Bambara, RNAS Trincomalee, Trincomalee, Ceylon, 1944-1947
- HMS Berhunda, RNAS Colombo Racecourse, Colombo, Ceylon, 1943-1945
- HMS Blackcap, RNAS Stretton, Cheshire, England, 1942-1958
- HMS Buzzard (1), RNAS Lympne, Kent, England, 1939
- HMS Buzzard (2), RNAS Palisadoes, Kingston, Jamaica 1941-1943
- HMS Condor, RNAS Arbroath, Angus, Scotland, 1940-1970
- HMS Condor II, RNAS Dundee, Angus, Scotland, 1940-1944
- HMS Corncrake, RNAS Ballyhalbert, County Down, Northern Ireland, 1945-1946
- HMS Corncrake II, RNAS Kirkistown, County Down, Northern Ireland, 1945-1946
- HMS Curlew, RNAS St Merryn, Cornwall, 1953-1956 (previously HMS Vulture 1937-1953)
- HMS Daedalus, RNAS Lee-on-Solent, Lee-on-the-Solent, Hampshire, England 1939-1960 and 1965-1996 (previously HMS Ariel 1959 - 1965)
- HMS Daedalus II, RNAS Lympne, Kent, England, 1940 (previously HMS Buzzard 1939)
- HMS Daedalus II, RNAS Sandbanks, Hampshire, England, 1940-1943
- HMS Daedalus II, RNAS Lawrenny Ferry, Pembrokeshire, Wales, 1941-1946
- HMS Dipper, RNAS Henstridge, Somerset, 1943-1958
- HMS Europa II, RNAS Bungay, Suffolk, England 1945-1946
- HMS Falcon, RNAS Hal Far, Malta, 1946-1965
- HMS Fieldfare, RNAS Evanton, Ross and Cromarty, 1944-1948
- HMS Flycatcher (1), RNAS Ludham, Norfolk, England, 1944-1945
- HMS Flycatcher (2), RNAS Middle Wallop, Hampshire, 1945-1946
- HMS Flycatcher (3), RNAS Kai Tak, Hong Kong, 1947
- HMS Fulmar, RNAS Lossiemouth, Lossiemouth, Moray, 1946 -1972
- HMS Fulmar II, RNAS Milltown, Moray, Scotland, 1946–1977
- HMS Gadwall, RNAS Belfast, Belfast, Northern Ireland, 1943-1946 (later HMS Gannet III 1946-1959)
- HMS Gamecock, RNAS Bramcote, Warwickshire, England, 1946-1958
- HMS Gannet, RNAS Eglinton, County Down, Northern Ireland, 1943-1959
- HMS Gannet II, RNAS Maydown, County Down, Northern Ireland, 1945-1947 (previously HMS Gannet III 1943-1945)
- HMS Gannet III, RNAS Belfast, Belfast, Northern Ireland, 1946-1959 (previously HMS Gadwall 1943-1946)
- HMS Garuda, RNAS/RNARY Coimbatore, India, 1942-1946
- HMS Godwit (1), RNAS Hinstock, Shropshire, 1942–1947
- HMS Godwit (2), RNAS Peplow, Shropshire, 1947-1949 (was HMS Godwit II 1945-1947)
- HMS Godwit II, RNAS Weston Park, Weston Park, Shropshire, England, 1944-1945
- HMS Goldcrest (1), RNAS Angle, Pembrokeshire, Wales, 1943
- HMS Goldcrest (2), RNAS Dale, Pembrokeshire, Wales, 1943-1948
- HMS Goldcrest (3), RNAS Brawdy, Pembrokeshire, Wales, 1952-1971
- HMS Goldcrest II, RNAS Brawdy, Pembrokeshire, Wales, 1946-1948
- HMS Goldfinch, RNAS Takali, Malta, 1945-1953
- HMS Goshawk, RNAS Piarco, Trinidad, 1940-1946
- HMS Grebe, RNAS Dekheila, Alexandria, Egypt, 1940-1946
- HMS Heron II (1), RNAS Haldon, Devon, England, 1941-1942
- HMS Heron II (2), RNAS Charlton Horethorne, Somerset, 1942-1948
- HMS Hornbill, RNAS Culham, Oxfordshire, 1944-1954
- HMS Hornbill II, RNAS Beccles, Suffolk, 1945-1953
- HMS Hummingbird, RNAS Zeals, Wiltshire, England, 1945-?
- HMS Jackdaw, RNAS Crail, Fife, 1940-1947
- HMS Jackdaw II, RNAS Dunino, Fife, Scotland, 1942-1946 (satellite airfield of Crail)
- HMS Kestrel, RNAS Worthy Down, Hampshire, England, 1939-1952
- HMS Kilele, RNAS Tanga, Tanganyika, East Africa, 1942-1944
- HMS Kipanga, RNAS Killindini, Mombasa, Kenya, 1942-1944
- HMS Landrail, RNAS Machrihanish, Argyll and Bute, Scotland, 1941-1952
- HMS Landrail II, RNAS Campbeltown, Argyll and Bute, Scotland, 1941-1945 (was HMS Landrail 1941)
- HMS Malagas, RNAS Wingfield, South Africa, 1942-1946
- HMS Merlin, RNAS Donibristle, Fife, Scotland, 1939–1959
- HMS Nabbington, MONAB I (RNAS Nowra), RAAF Base Nowra, Nowra, New South Wales, Australia, 1944-1945
- HMS Nabberley, MONAB II (RNAS Bankstown), Bankstown Airport, Bankstown, New South Wales, Australia, 1944-1946
- HMS Nabthorpe, MONAB III (RNAS Schofields), RAAF Station Schofields, Schofields, New South Wales, Australia, 1944-1945
- HMS Nabaron, MONAB IV (RNAS Ponum), NAS Ponam Airfield, Ponam, Admiralty Islands, 1945
- HMS Nabswick, MONAB V (RNAS Jervis Bay), RAAF Jervis Bay, Jervis Bay, Jervis Bay Territory, Australia (later RAAF Base Nowra), 1945-1946
- HMS Nabsford, TAMY I (RNAMY Archerfield), RAAF Station Archerfield, Brisbane, Queensland, Australia, 1945-1946
- HMS Nabstock, MONAB VI (RNAS Maryborough), RAAF Maryborough, Maryborough, Queensland, Australia (later RAAF Station Schofields), 1945-1946
- HMS Nabcatcher, MONAB VIII, RNAS Kai Tak, Hong Kong, 1945-1947
- HMS Nabrock, MONAB IX, RNAS Sembawang, Sembawang, Singapore, 1945
- HMS Nabhurst, MONAB X, RNAS Middle Wallop, Hampshire, England, 1945
- HMS Nighthawk, RNAS Drem, East Lothian, Scotland, 1945-1946
- HMS Nighthawk II, RNAS Macmerry, East Lothian, Scotland, 1945
- HMS Nightjar, RNAS Inskip, Lancashire, England, 1943-1946 (also known as HMS Inskip)
- HMS Nile II, RN Air Section Aboukir at RAF Aboukir, Abu Qir, Egypt, 1935-1942
- HMS Nuthatch, RNAS Anthorn, Cumbria, England, 1943-1958
- HMS Osprey, RNAS Portland, Dorset, England, 1939-1999
- HMS Owl, RNAS Fearn, Ross-shire, 1942-1946
- HMS Peewit, RNAS East Haven, Angus, Scotland, 1943-1949
- HMS Peregrine RNAS Ford, West Sussex, England, 1939-1940, 1945-1948 and 1950-1958
- HMS Phoenix, RNARY Fayid, Egypt, 1941-1946 (RN Aircraft Repair Yard)
- HMS Pintail, RNAS Nutts Corner, County Antrim, Northern Ireland, 1945-1946
- HMS Raven, RNAS Eastleigh, Hampshire, England, 1939-1946
- HMS Ringtail, RNAS Burscough, Lancashire, England, 1943-1946
- HMS Robin, RNAS Grimsetter, Mainland, Orkney, Scotland, 1943-1945
- HMS Sanderling, RNAS Abbotsinch, Renfrewshire, Scotland, 1943-1963
- HMS Shrike, RNAS Maydown, County Down, Northern Ireland, 1943-1945 (later HMS Gannet III 1945-1947)
- HMS Simbang, RNAS Sembawang, Singapore, 1945-1947, 1950-1957 and 1963-1971
- HMS Siskin, RNAS Gosport, Hampshire, England, 1945-1956 (Now HMS Sultan)
- HMS Sparrowhawk (1), RNAS Hatston, Mainland, Orkney, Scotland, 1939-1945
- HMS Sparrowhawk (2), RNAS Halesworth, Suffolk, England, 1945-1946
- HMS Spurwing, RNAS Hastings, Freetown, Sierra Leone, 1943-1944
- HMS Tern, RNAS Twatt, Mainland, Orkney, Scotland, 1942-1945
- HMS Tern II, RNAS Skeabrae, Mainland, Orkney, Scotland, 1945-1946
- HMS Tern II, RNAS Hatston, Mainland, Orkney, Scotland, 1945 (was previously HMS Sparrowhawk)
- HMS Tern III, RNAS Dounreay, Caithness, Scotland, 1945-1946
- HMS Ukussa, RNAS Katukurunda, Ceylon, 1942-1946
- HMS Urley, RNAS Ronaldsway, Isle of Man
- HMS Vairi, RNAS Sullur, Coimbatore, India, 1944-1946
- HMS Valluru, RNAS Tambaram, Madras, India, 1944-1945
- HMS Vulture, RNAS St Merryn, Cornwall, England, 1937-1953 (later HMS Curlew 1953-1956)
- HMS Vulture II, RNAS Trelliga, Cornwall, 1940-1955 (live firing range & emergency landing ground)
- HMS Wagtail, RNAS Ayr, Ayrshire, Scotland, 1944-1936
- HMS Wara, RNAS Komenda, Takoradi, Ghana, 1943

=== Former Royal Naval Hospitals ===
- RNH Bermuda.
- RNH Bighi, Malta
- RNH Gibraltar, Gibraltar
- RNH Gillingham, in Medway, Kent
- RNH, Convalescent Hospital, Great Malvern 1915-1919
- RNH Greenwich, in London
- RNH Haslar, Gosport, England
- RNH Mauritius
- RNH Mtarfa, Malta
- RNH Plymouth, known as Stonehouse, Devonport, England
- RNH Portland, Dorset.
- RNH Simon's Town, South Africa
- Royal Naval Hospital (Hong Kong) – now Ruttonjee Hospital in Hong Kong, China
- RNH Trincomalee, Trincomalee, Sri Lanka (Ceylon)

=== Former shore bases ===
==== A to D ====
- HMS Abastor, Tilbury
- HMS Abatos, the bombed-out Supermarine factory, Woolston, Southampton
- HMS Afrikander, Base depot ship, Simon's Town, South Africa
- HMS Aggressive, Coastal Forces Motor Launch (ML) and Steam Gun Boat base, Newhaven, East Sussex
- HMS Allenby, Combined Operations base, Folkestone
- HMS Ambrose, Headquarters of 9th Submarine Flotilla (1940–1946), Dundee
- HMS Anderson, listening station of the Far East Combined Bureau, Colombo, Ceylon
- HMS Ararat (later HMS Brontosaurus), Combined Training Centre, Castle Toward, Toward, Argyll
- HMS Arbella, Combined Operations Landing Craft Training Establishment, Boston, Lincolnshire
- HMS Appledore, Combined Operations base and training establishment, Fremington Camp, Fremington, Devon
- HMS Appledore II, Combined Operations base, Ilfracombe
- HMS Ariel (formerly HMS Kestrel), RNAS Worthy Down, Winchester, Hampshire
- HMS Ariel, Royal Naval Aircraft Training Establishment, Culcheth, Warrington, Cheshire
- HMS Armanillo, Combined Operations RN Beach Commando training centre, Glenfinnart
- HMS Asbury, shore based transit accommodation, Asbury Park, New Jersey
- HMS Atlantic Isle, U-boat monitoring station, Tristan da Cunha during WWII
- HMS Attack, Coastal Forces MLs and storage, RN Dockyard, Portland
- HMS Avalon, St. John's, Newfoundland and Labrador, Canada
- HMS Badger, HQ of Flag Officer Harwich and Coastal Forces base (1939–1946), Harwich
- HMS Baldur (also HMS Baldur II), Accommodation and accounting, Iceland
- HMS Beaver, HQ, Flag Officer-in-Charge, Humber, (1 October 1940 – July 1945) – (base A.O. at Grimsby)
- HMS Beaver II, Coastal Forces MLs, Immingham
- HMS Bee, Coastal Forces MLs working up base, Weymouth (1942–1943), then Holyhead, Wales (1943–1945)
- HMS Beehive, Coastal Forces MTBs and MGBs, Boomer Hall, Felixstowe, Suffolk
- HMS Bellerophon, Portsmouth, Hampshire
- HMS Benbow, Trinidad
- HMS Birnbeck, Secret weapons research and testing (1941–1946), Birnbeck Pier, Weston-super-Mare
- HMS Bluebird III, (formerly HMS Allenby, possibly), Folkestone
- HMS Boscawen, Naval Police Patrol HQ, Portland, Dorset
- HMS Britannia III, Coastal Forces Motor Torpedo Boat & Motor Gun Boats, Dartmouth
- HMS Brontosaurus (formerly HMS Ararat), Combined Operations landing craft crew training, Castle Toward, Toward, Argyll
- HMS Cabbala, Training establishment for WRNS W/T operators, at Lowton near Warrington
- HMS Caledonia, Rosyth, Fife
- HMS Cambridge (shore establishment), Wembury, Devon
- HMS Caroline (1914), Coastal Forces MLs, Belfast
- HMS Centurion, Gosport, Hampshire
- HMS Centurion, Haslemere, Surrey
- HMS Ceres (formerly HMS Demetrius), Wetherby, Yorkshire
- HMS Ceres, Yeadon, West Yorkshire
- HMS Cicala, Coastal Forces MTBs & MGBs, Dartmouth
- HMS Claverhouse, Coastal Forces MLs, Leith
- HMS Cochrane (formerly RNAS Donibristle/HMS Merlin), Rosyth, Fife
- HMS Copra, Combined Operations Pay, Ratings and Accounts, The Moorings, Largs
- HMS Cricket, Landing Craft training base, River Hamble, Hampshire
- HMS Daedalus III, RNAE Bedhampton Camp, Havant, Hampshire
- HMS Dalriada, Royal Naval Reserve base, Greenock, Inverclyde,
- HMS Dalriada, Royal Naval Reserve base, Inverkip, Inverclyde,
- HMS Dartmouth II, Coastal Forces MTBs, MGBs & MLs, Dartmouth
- HMS Defiance, Torpedo school, Devonport, Devon
- HMS Defiance, Fleet Maintenance Base, Devonport
- HMS Dinosaur I, HQ for tank landing craft training, Troon, Ayrshire
- HMS Dinosaur II, Landing craft and work-up base, Irvine, Ayrshire
- HMS Dorlin, Combined Operations RN Beach Signals and Royal Signals sections battle training, Dorlin House, Acharacle, Argyll
- HMS Dolphin, Gosport, Hampshire
- HMS Dryad, former location of the Maritime Warfare School, Southwick, Hampshire
- HMS Duke, Basic Training Establishment, Malvern, 1944–1945. The Telecommunications Research Establishment moved into Duke in 1946 (renamed in turn the Radar Research Establishment, the Royal Radar Establishment and the Royal Signals and Radar Establishment) and is now a QinetiQ research site.
- HMS Dundonald I, Holding and training base for RN Beach Commandos, Gailes Camp, Auchengate, Troon, Ayrshire
- HMS Dundonald II, Combined Signal School (CSS), Auchingate, Troon, Ayrshire

==== E to K ====
- HMS Egmont, Naval HQ, Fort St Angelo, Birgu, Malta
- HMS Ferret (later HMS Sea Eagle), Convoy escort base and anti-submarine training, Londonderry, Northern Ireland
- HMS Fervent, Coastal Forces MTBs, MGBs & MLs, Ramsgate
- HMS Fisgard, artificer and engineer training (1848–1983), Torpoint, Cornwall
- HMS Fledgling/RNAS Mill Meece. Training establishment for WRNS Air Mechanics (Ordnance) engineers, Mill Meece, Staffordshire
- HMS Flora III, Coastal Forces MLs, Invergordon, Scotland
- HMS Flycatcher, HQ of Mobile Naval Air Bases during World War II, Ludham then Middle Wallop. RNAS Kai Tak from 1947.
- HMS Flowerdown, Y-station at RAF Flowerdown
- HMS Foliot I, Landing craft accounting base, Plymouth
- HMS Foliot III, Combined Operations holding base, Buckleigh, Plymouth
- HMS Forest Moor, HF receiver station, Nidderdale, Harrogate
- HMS Forte IV, Coastal Forces MLs, Falmouth
- HMS Forward, Command and radar plotting centre, Newhaven
- HMS Forward II (later HMS Aggressive), Coastal Forces MTBs, Newhaven
- HMS Fox, Coastal Forces MTBs & MLs, Lerwick, Scotland
- HMS Ganges, Boys' Training Establishment, Shotley, Ipswich, Suffolk
- HMS Glendower WWII training establishment, Butlin's Pwllheli holiday camp, Caernarfonshire
- HMS Golden Hind, WW2 RN Barracks, Sydney, Australia
- HMS Gosling, Royal Naval Air Establishment, Risley, Warrington, Cheshire, was a collection of 5 camps responsible for various aspects of training FAA personnel
- HMS Gunner, Auxiliary Patrol base, Lerwick, Shetland
- HMS Haig, Rye
- HMS Hannibal, Algiers
- HMS Harrier, Radar training establishment, near Dale, Pembrokeshire
- HMS Hawke, Landing craft, Exbury House, Hampshire
- HMS "Hawke", a temporary naval training school based within part of the Borstal Institution, 1940-46
- HMS Helder, Landing craft training, Brightlingsea
- HMS Helicon, Scapa Flow diversionary anchorage, 1939–40, Arctic convoys concentration point, 1942–44, Loch Ewe
- HMS Highflyer, Trincomalee, Ceylon
- HMS Hornet, Coastal Forces Depot MTB, Gosport, Hampshire
- HMS Idaho, WWI base at Milford Haven, Pembrokeshire
- HMS Inskip, Inskip, Preston, Lancashire
- HMS Jackdaw, RNAS Crail, Fife
- HMS James Cook, Combined Operations Beach Training Establishment, Glen Caladh, Nr Tighnabruaich, Argyll
- HMS Jufair, Bahrain
- HMS Kestrel (later HMS Ariel), Royal Naval Air Station and General Service Establishment, Worthy Down, near Winchester, England
- HMS King Alfred, WWII RNVR officer training centre, Hove, Sussex

==== L to R ====
- HMS Lanka, Colombo, Ceylon
- HMS Lizard, Combined Operations landing craft base, Shoreham
- HMS Lochailort, Combined Operations officer training, Inverailort House, Lochailort, Inverness-shire
- HMS Lochinvar, Fleet Minesweeper base, Port Edgar, South Queensferry
- HMS Louisburg (also HMS Roseneath), Combined Operations, Roseneath, Dunbartonshire
- HMS Lynx, HQ, Naval Officer-in-Charge, Dover & CO HMS Lynx, (10 July 1945 – April 1946)
- HMS Macaw, Bootle, Cumbria, England. FAA aircrew reception centre.
- HMS Malabar, Bermuda
- HMS Manatee, Landing craft, Yarmouth, Isle of Wight
- HMS Marlborough, Electrical training school, Eastbourne
- HMS Mastodon, Landing craft, Exbury House, Hampshire
- HMS Mauritius, Mauritius
- HMS Martelo, HQ Naval Officer-in-Charge, Lowestoft, (1 October 1945 – April 1946)
- HMS Medina, Landing craft and Fleet Air Arm, Puckpool, Ryde, Isle of Wight
- HMS Mentor, Lews Castle, Stornoway, Western Isles
- HMS Mercia, Communications Training Centre, Coventry
- HMS Mercury, Communications school, Petersfield, Hampshire
- HMS Midge, Great Yarmouth
- HMS Minos, HQ Naval Officer-in-Charge, Lowestoft, (5 May 1942 – 1 October 1945)
- HMS Monck, Combined Training HQ, Largs, Ayrshire
- HMS Monck, Combined Operations Carrier Training, Port Glasgow
- HMS Monck, Roseneath, Dunbartonshire
- HMS Monck, HQ Flag Officer Greenock, Greenock
- HMS Nemo, HQ Naval Officer-in-Charge, Brightlingsea, (June 1940 – May 1945)
- HMS Newt, Landing craft base, Newhaven
- HMS Nile, Alexandria, Egypt (1939–1946)
- HMS Nimrod, Anti-submarine warfare training from early 1940, Campbeltown, Argyll
- HMS Northney (HMS Northney I, HMS Northney II, HMS Northney III and HMS Northnney IV), Landing craft training base, Hayling Island
- HMS Osprey, (from January 1941), Asdic training, advanced courses for officers, Dunoon, Argyll
- HMS Pasco, Combined Operations landing craft signals training, Glenbranter Camp, Glenbranter, Strachur, Argyll
- HMS Pembroke, HQ, Commander-in-Chief, the Nore, (RN base, Chatham) Chatham, Kent
- HMS Pembroke, HQ, Admiral-Superintendent, Chatham Dockyard, Chatham, Kent
- HMS Pembroke, HQ, Commodore-in-Command, Royal Naval Barracks, Chatham, Chatham, Kent
- HMS Phœnicia, Manoel Island, Malta
- HMS Phoenix, Tipner, Portsmouth, Hampshire
- HMS President (parts later spun out as HMS St Vincent), Admiralty accounting base, Furse House, 37 Queen's Gate Terrace, London SW7
- HMS President II, HQ, Liaison Officer for Naval Reserve and Merchant Navy Duties, London, (8 February 1938 – August 1939)
- HMS Proserpine, Lyness, Orkney
- HMS Pyramus, Kirkwall, Orkney
- HMS Queen Charlotte WWII land-based gunnery school, Shore Rd., Ainsdale Southport, Lancashire
- HMS Quebec, Combined Operations training, Inverary, Argyll
- HMS Return, Tokyo, Japan – now British Embassy in Tokyo
- HMS Robertson, Holding base for RM landing craft personnel, Kitchener Camp, Richborough, Kent
- HMS Rooke, Gibraltar
- HMS Roseneath (also HMS Louisburg), Combined Operations, Roseneath, Dunbartonshire
- HMS Royal Albert, Wireless Station (SIGINT), Cuxhaven, Germany. Post-WWII
- HMS Royal Arthur, Petty Officers' training school, Butlins Skegness, later Corsham, Wiltshire
- HMS Royal Charlotte, Wireless Station (SIGINT), Cuxhaven, Germany. Post-WWII
- Royal Naval College, Greenwich, London

==== S to Z ====
- HMS St Angelo, Naval HQ, Fort St Angelo, Birgu, Malta
- HMS St Barbara, Bognor Regis, Sussex, anti-aircraft firing range and gunnery training school
- HMS St Christopher, Coastal Forces training base, Fort William, Inverness-shire
- HMS St George, Gosport, Hampshire
- HMS St Matthew, Commando training base 1943–1945, Burnham-on-Crouch, Essex
- HMS St Vincent (1927–1969), Boys and Juniors Training Establishment, Gosport, Hampshire
- HMS St Vincent (1992–1998), Communications centre, Whitehall, London
- HMS Salford, RNR Communications Training Centre, Salford
- HMS Scotia, Basic training, 1942, from 1959 RNR Rosyth, Butlin's Ayr, South Ayrshire
- HMS Sea Eagle (formerly HMS Ferret), Eglinton, County Londonderry, Northern Ireland
- HMS Sea Serpent, Bracklesham Bay and Birdham, near Chichester
- HMS Seahawk, Coastal Forces training base, Ardrishaig, Argyll
- HMS Sembawang (Singapore Naval Base), was the Royal Navy's biggest dockyard and its base of operations in the Far East from 1939 until 1971. HMS Terror (1945–1971) was the barracks next to the naval base, while the nearby HMS Simbang was a RN Air Station.
- HMS Sheba, Aden
- HMS Spartiate, Western Approaches Command, St Enoch's Hotel, Glasgow
- HMS Squid, Tank landing craft repair base, Southampton
- HMS Squid II, Landing craft squadron staff, Westcliff Hall Hotel, Hythe
- HMS Standard, WWII training establishment for men who would otherwise be discharged, Kielder, Northumberland
- HMS Stopford, Landing craft working-up base, Bo'ness
- HMS Talbot, Manoel Island, Malta
- HMS Tamar, Base operated from 1897 to 1997 at two locations in Hong Kong
- HMS Tarlair, Hydrophone training school during World War I, Hawkcraig near Aberdour
- HMS Thunderer, Royal Naval Engineering College, Keyham and Manadon, Plymouth, Devon
- HMS Tormentor, Landing craft operational base, Hamble, Southampton
- HMS Tormentor II Training camp, Cowes, Isle of Wight
- HMS Tullichewan (previously HMS Spartiate II), Holding base for Combined Operations, Tullichewan Castle Camp, Balloch, Loch Lomond, Scotland
- HMS Turnstone, RN Aircraft Training Establishment (RNATE) Watford & RNATE Fulham, (combined independent command)
- HMS Turtle, Combined Operations training, Poole, Dorset
- HMS Uva, Diyatalawa, Ceylon
- HMS Valkyrie, Training establishment for HO ratings, Isle of Man
- HMS Varbel, X class submarine training, Port Bannatyne Hydropathic Hotel, Port Bannatyne, Isle of Bute, Scotland
- HMS Varbell II, X class submarine advanced training, Ardtaraig House, Loch Striven, Argyll, Scotland
- HMS Vectis (shore establishment), Cowes Castle, Cowes, Isle of Wight
- HMS Vernon, Portsmouth, Hampshire
- HMS Wagtail, RNAS Ayr
- HMS Warren, Combined Operations senior officer training, Largs, Ayrshire
- HMS Wasp, Coastal Forces HQ, Lord Warden Hotel, Dover
- HMS Watchful, HQ, Flag Officer-in-Charge, Yarmouth, (14 April 1942 – July 1945)
- HMS Waxwing, RNAE Townhill, Royal Naval Air Establishment, Dunfermline, Fife, Scotland, 1942-1946
- HMS Westcliffe, Flotilla training, Southend
- HMS Westcliffe II, Combined Operations holding base for RM landing craft personnel, Burnham-on-Crouch, Essex
- HMS Wildfire, Chatham, Kent
- HMS Wildfire II (1939–1940), Combined Operations base, Sheerness
- HMS Wildfire III (1940–1946), Combined Operations base, Sheerness
- HMS Woolvestone, Landing craft base, Ipswich
- HMS Yeoman, HQ, Flag Officer-in-Charge, London, (3 February 1942 – July 1945)
- HMS Yeoman, HQ, Naval Officer-in-Charge, London, (1-30, April, 1946)

==== Other ====
- Bedhampton Camp, former non airfield satellite of RNAS Lee-on-Solent (HMS Daedalus).
- Seafield Park, a non airfield site near to RNAS Lee-on-Solent.

Royal Naval Armaments Depots

- RNAD Broughton Moor, Cumbria, England
- RNAD Crombie, Fife
- RNAD Dean Hill, Salisbury, Wiltshire, England
- RNAD Gosport including Priddy's Hard, Hampshire, England

Royal Naval Stores Depots

Include:

- RNSD Almondbank/RNAW Almondbank/RNAW Perth, Almondbank, Perth & Kinross – now a Eurocopter installation.
- RNSD Coventry, Warwickshire, England
- RNSD Copenacre, England. (1940–1995),
- RNSD Eaglescliffe, Teesside, England
- RNSD Llangennech, Llangennech, Carmarthenshire, Wales, (1945–1995)
- RNSD Lathalmond, Dunfermline, Scotland
- RNSD Trecwn, Trecwn, Pembrokeshire, West Wales
- RNSD Woolston, Woolston, Southampton, Hampshire, England

Royal Navy Aircraft Yards

- RNAY Wroughton, Aircraft storage and maintenance unit, Wroughton, Swindon, England

== See also ==
- Admiralty Mining Establishment
