= HMS Forward =

Four ships and two shore establishments of the Royal Navy have borne the name HMS Forward:

Ships

- HMS Forward (1805) was a 12-gun gun-brig launched in 1805 and sold in 1815.
- HMS Forward (1855) was an Albacore-class wooden screw gunboat launched in 1855 and sold in 1869.
- HMS Forward (1877) was a composite screw gunboat launched in 1877. She became a coal hulk in 1892 and was sold in 1904.
- HMS Forward (1904) was a Forward-class scout cruiser launched in 1904 and sold in 1921.

Shore establishments

- HMS Forward (1939 shore establishment) was the name given to the Navy's base at Newhaven. It was commissioned on 25 August 1939 and paid off in 1945.
  - HMS Forward II was the Coastal Forces base at Newhaven between 1941 and 1942, when it was renamed HMS Aggressive.
- HMS Forward (1984 shore establishment) is a Royal Naval Reserve unit and communications training centre in Birmingham. It was commissioned in 1984 and is currently active.
