= Royal Marines Reserve =

Volunteer reserve force of the Royal Marines

- Badge of the Royal Marines
- Active: 1948–present
- Country: United Kingdom
- Allegiance: King Charles III
- Branch: His Majesty's Naval Service
- Type: Marine corps
- Role: Volunteer Reserve
- Size: 600 Royal Marines Reserve
- Mottos: Per Mare, Per Terram ("By Sea, By Land")
- Colours: Blue; Gold; Green; Red; Blue
- March: Quick: "A Life on the Ocean Wave"; Slow: "Preobrajensky"
- Anniversaries: Corps Birthday: 28 October 1664
- Deployments: Falklands War; Operation Haven; Cyprus; Bosnian War; Kosovo War; Sierra Leone Civil War; Iraq War; War in Afghanistan
- Website: Royal Marine Reserves

Commanders
- Commandant General: General Sir Gwyn Jenkins
- Commander Maritime Reserves: Commodore Jo Adey

Insignia
- Commando flash
- Abbreviation: RMR

The Royal Marines Reserve (RMR) is the volunteer reserve force used to augment the regular Royal Marines. The RMR consists of some 600 trained ranks distributed among the four units within the UK. About 10 percent of the force are working with the Regular Corps on long-term attachments in all of the Royal Marines regular units. All the volunteers within the RMR must pass through the same rigorous commando course as the regulars. Volunteers may be civilians with no previous military experience or may be former regular Royal Marines.

== Mission ==
The mission of the RMR is to act as a general reserve to the Royal Marines command and to promote a nationwide link between the military and civilian community. The official mission statement:

- Reinforce the Royal Marines when required, with individuals and sub-units worldwide.
- Promote a nationwide link between the Royal Marines and civilian communities.
- Provide a nationwide infrastructure for strengthening and replacing the regular forces in times of national emergency.

== History ==
The RMR can trace their roots back to the Royal Marines Forces Volunteer Reserve (RMFVR) formed in the Cities of London and Glasgow under the Royal Marines Act 1948. The RMFVR were officially formed on the 5 November 1948, at a ceremonial parade on the Honourable Artillery Company's Artillery Ground the same place the Royal Marines were formed on 28 October 1664.

In the beginning, Reservists were chiefly former hostilities only (HO) personnel. They were mainly, but not solely, Royal Marines who had gained experience in World War II and trained in order to support the Corps against the threat from the Soviet Bloc. However, today the majority of Reservists have no previous military experience. Their transition from civilian to Marine, is therefore more challenging. Moreover, 21st century threats compel the training to be more comprehensive to equip the Marine with a variety of skills. The Reserves have adapted to these changes and remains flexible.

== Structure ==
There are currently four Royal Marines Reserve units within the UK. These units are located throughout the country situated within or near major cities. Each of the main units acts as Headquarters for a number of smaller satellite detachments that spread out into the surrounding area to recruit locally in nearby population centers. As of the Summer 2013 following the restructuring (which saw the closure/amalgamation of certain RMR units and detachments), the current organisation of the RMR is as follows:

- Royal Marines Reserve Bristol, at HMS Flying Fox, Bristol
  - Lympstone Detachment, at the Commando Training Centre, Lympstone
  - Plymouth Detachment, at Walcheren Building, HMNB Devonport
  - Poole Detachment, at RM Poole, Poole
  - Cardiff Detachment, at HMS Cambria, Cardiff
- Royal Marines Reserve City of London, at Wandsworth Barracks
  - Cambridge Detachment, in Coldham, Cambridge
  - Marlow Detachment, Old Horns Lane, Marlow, Buckinghamshire
  - Portsmouth Detachment, at HMS King Alfred, HMNB Portsmouth
- Royal Marines Reserve Merseyside, at HMS Eaglet, Liverpool
  - Birmingham Detachment, at HMS Forward, Birmingham
  - Leeds Detachment, at HMS Ceres, Carlton Barracks, Leeds
  - Manchester Detachment, at Haldane Barracks, Salford
  - Nottingham Detachment, at HMS Sherwood, Nottingham
- Royal Marines Reserve Scotland, at HMS Caledonia, Rosyth Dockyard
  - Aberdeen Detachment, at Gordon Barracks, Bridge of Don, Aberdeen
  - Dundee Detachment, at Strathmore Avenue in Dundee
  - Edinburgh Detachment, at Colinton Road, Edinburgh
  - Glasgow Detachment, at HMS Dalriada, Glasgow
  - Belfast Detachment, at Palace Barracks, Belfast
  - Newcastle upon Tyne Detachment, at HMS Calliope, Quayside, Newcastle upon Tyne

(Previously Tyne used to be its own RMR unit until its amalgamation with RMR Scotland.)

== Recruit training ==
Over a period of 12–15 months, RMR recruits are required to attend training at their units, one evening a week and usually two weekends a month. In addition, when not training with the RMR they must work on their physical fitness in their own time.

=== Phase 1 ===
Phase 1 lasts for at least 6 months and is the beginning of RMR basic training. It is designed to introduce recruits to the rudiments of individual skills and fieldcraft. Recruits must complete 6 Weekend training periods in addition to training for two hours for one evening a week. On completion of their phase 1 training, recruits are required to attend a 2-week course at the Commando Training Centre Royal Marines (CTCRM). Recruits wear the blue beret with red badge backing issued to RM personnel who have not passed the commando course.

Basic fieldcraft - Instruction on how to fend for themselves under field conditions. This covers the construction of different types of shelters ("bivvies"), the use of the different types of ration pack, how to maintain themselves and their standards of hygiene under arduous conditions, camouflage and concealment.

Navigation - Theoretical and practical aspects of finding their way over all types of terrain by day and night.

Weapon training - Instruction on how to handle, maintain, strip and clean their SA80 rifle.

Physical training - It is important from the outset, it is progressive and prepares recruits for Battle Physical Training (BPT) in Phase 2. Physical training periods concentrate on introducing and developing the techniques required for rope climbing, regains, fireman's carry and obstacle courses with an introduction to speed marching and load carries. However, it is necessary for recruits to continue fitness training in their own time in order to build their strength and endurance to the required level.

Field exercises - Recruits are taught and tested on how they fend for themselves under field conditions, they soon learn that their comfort and survival in the field and on operations begins with good personal organisation and preparedness. To bring these points home there is usually an inspection every morning — the NCOs have an eagle eye for detail.

Confirmation Course - This two-week course is designed as a test of the recruit's individual and physical skills. Recruits must pass at an acceptable and comparable level to their counterparts in regular service. The course also introduces the recruits to CTCRM and provides an insight into the conduct of the commando tests while assessing the skills learnt and practiced at their unit.

=== Phase 2 ===
Phase 2 lasts for 8 to 10 months and is designed to equip recruits with the skills and knowledge required to act as a Marine in a Commando Unit, in addition to preparing them for the rigours of the Reserve Forces Commando Course. Physical training is undertaken wearing personal load carrying equipment (PLCE/fighting order/webbing). Throughout Phase 1 training, weight is gradually added to the recruit's PLCE until it weighs the 22 lb (10.0 kg) required during the Commando Course. In addition the recruits will carry their rifle, weighing a further 10 lbs (4.5 kg).

Battle Physical Training - BPT - Is designed to develop physical military skills, strength and endurance, whilst preparing recruits to withstand mental pressure. The BPT is designed to prepare Recruits for their BPT Pass Out and the Commando Course.

Fieldcraft and tactics - The development and practise of the recruit's Individual and Fieldcraft skills continues. Tactical instruction begins with Basic Patrolling Techniques before moving onto Recce Patrols, Observation Posts, Fighting Patrols and Ambushes.

Live field firing exercise - After passing the required build up packages at their units, recruits conduct a two-week field firing package conducted at CTCRM with a regular Troop. Recruits are introduced to realistic live firing exercises conducted on field firing areas. This reflects the progression from individual shooting on a simple range to a live firing troop attack involving 30 Marines.

Amphibious exercise - Marines are taught the theory and drills associated with amphibious warfare. Practical training then takes place using a variety of offshore and inshore craft during day and night culminating in an amphibious exercise, where the Marines conduct amphibious raids from the sea.

=== Reserve Forces Commando Course ===
The RFCC is the culmination of all the recruits training. The course begins with the BPT (Battle Physical Training) Pass Out which consists of a 30 Foot Rope Climb, 200m Fireman's Carry, Assault Course and Full Regain. All this is undertaken carrying Full Fighting Order and Weapon. Successful recruits then progress onto the 12 Mile Loaded Carry and Four Day Field Exercise. Once passed, recruits are awarded the cap comforter and may continue onto the final element of the course, the commando tests. These commando tests consist of the Tarzan Assault Course, Endurance Course, 9 Mile Speed March and 30 Miler. On successful completion of the RFCC, at the end of the 30 Miler, the RMR recruits are awarded the coveted green beret.

== Life as a reservist ==
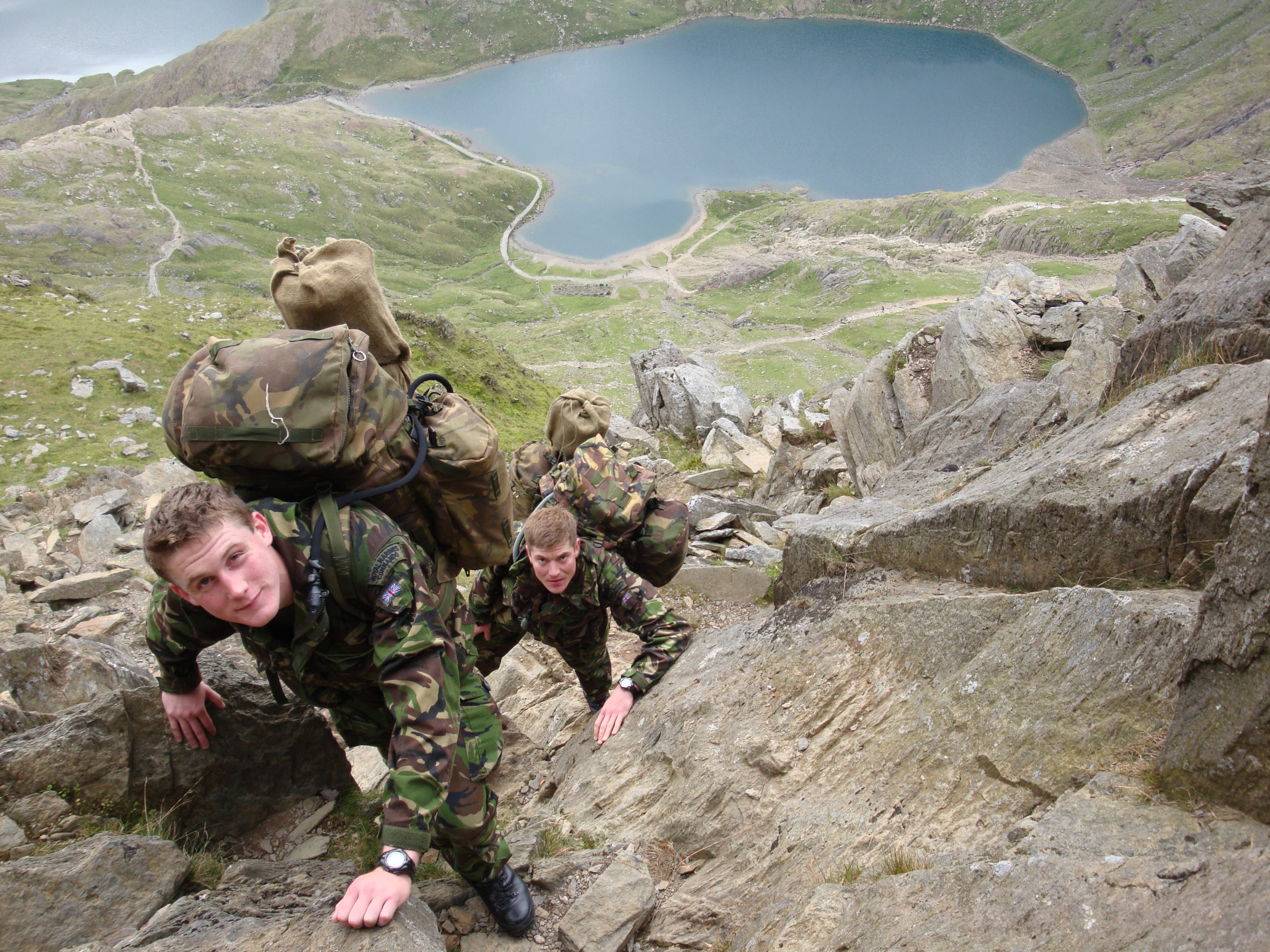
RMR mountain training in Wales 2008

On earning their green beret following the completion of Phase 2 training, Marines join a 'Commando Company' within their RMR units. Marines must then undertake Phase 3 training, which consists of a course at CTCRM practising troop attack exercises and amphibious assaults. Only after completing this are Marines considered fully trained general duties rifleman, capable of serving with the regular corps. Marines go on to complete further training and operations with their commando company, and will eventually be able to specialise in a chosen trade.

=== Operations ===
Royal Marines Reservists have participated in almost all major modern operational deployments and conflicts that the regular marines have been deployed to, such as Operation Telic and Operation Herrick. In 2013 Royal Marines took part in exercises such exercise Black Alligator 13 in California, United States involving live firing exercises alongside their regular counterparts from 40 Commando. All trained ranks within the Royal Marines Reserve have the opportunity to serve in the Full Time Reserve Service with the regular Corps anywhere in the world, on exercise or operations. These periods can vary from 2 weeks up to 12 months. These opportunities are advertised within the RMR Units. It is estimated that up to 60% of all serving Reservists have served on combat operations, some doing tours of Afghanistan several times.

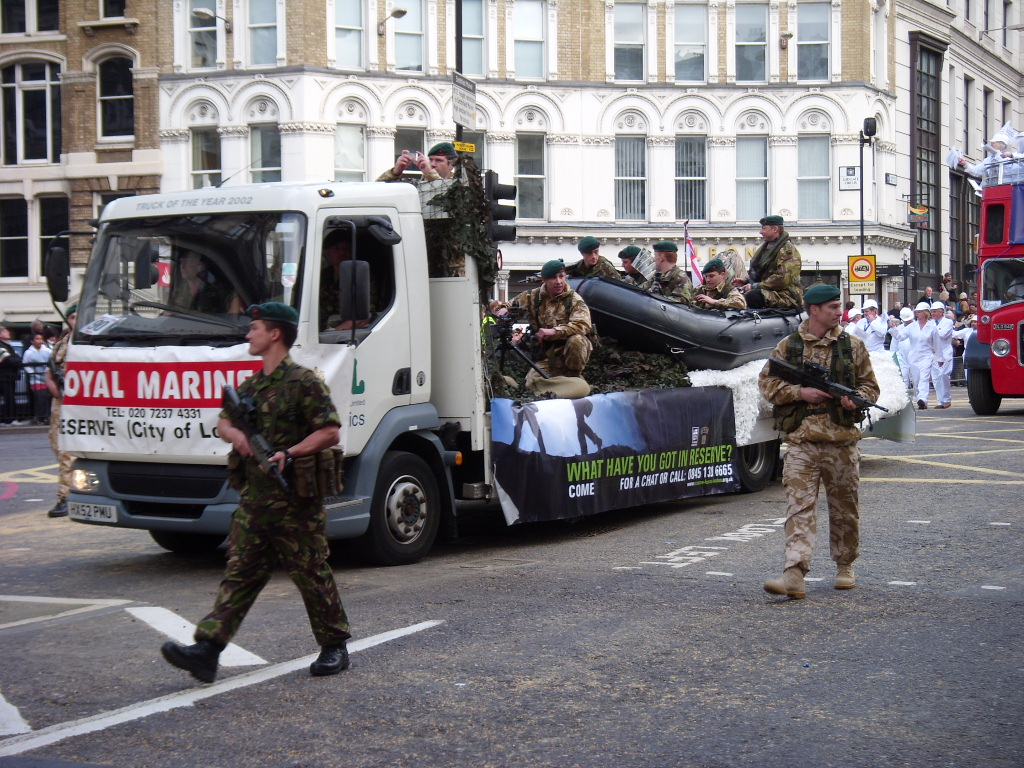
RMR in the Lord Mayor's Show in the City of London, in 2007

=== Further training ===
The purpose of the Marines Units Commando Company is to continue to expand and build on the Marine's individual and team skills through further training, in order for development. Within their RMR Units Marines will train so as to consolidate their basic soldiering skills such as weapon training, first aid, signals, nuclear biological chemical warfare, physical fitness, etc. In addition to this, Marines will also develop more advanced skills such as conducting amphibious raids and learning how to conduct operations in built up areas. Throughout each year Commando Company conduct a number of weekend exercises where they are given the opportunity to learn and develop new skills. For example, a unit live field firing exercise, where Marines would employ and practise weapon drills, marksmanship and troop tactics using live ammunition.

=== Specialist training ===
After a qualifying period as a general duties rifleman, Marines have the opportunity to specialise in a chosen trade. A number of these open to the Royal Marines Reservists are Assault Engineer, Landing Craft, Skills at Arms Instructor, Physical Training Instructor and Swimmer Canoeist. The majority of courses are abridged versions of those undertaken by regulars, courses usually last two to four weeks. Four-week courses are divided up into separate two-week packages. As reservists progress through the ranks in the RMR, they can attend further courses in their chosen specialisation that are of a more advanced nature (e.g.. LC3 - Marine; LC2 - Corporal; LC1 - Sergeant). However, many reservists are given the opportunity to attend the full courses undertaken by regulars if they are able to make the time available..

=== Notable members ===
In 2008, Royal Marine Reservist Lance Corporal Matthew Croucher received the George Cross for his actions whilst deployed with 40 Commando in Afghanistan. The incident occurred whilst on a reconnaissance patrol, when upon entering a compound he felt himself activate a grenade tripwire. L/Cpl Croucher deliberately fell onto the device aiming to protect his colleagues from the blast. He managed to cushion the majority of the blast with his Bergen whilst his body armour stopped further shrapnel, this left him with only minor injuries and his fellow Marines unharmed.
