= Pyramus (disambiguation) =

Pyramus is a character in Greek mythology.

Pyramus may also refer to:

- Pyramus, a historical name for the Ceyhan River in Turkey
- 14871 Pyramus, an asteroid
- HMS Pyramus, two Royal Navy ships
- Denis Pyramus, 12th-13th century Anglo-Norman Benedictine monk and poet

== See also ==
- Bayerotrochus pyramus, commonly called the pyramus slit shell, a species of large sea snail
- Poecilmitis pyramus, also known as the Pyramus opal, a species of butterfly
