= HMS Forward (1939 shore establishment) =

- Newhaven, East Sussex

Site information
- Type: Royal Naval Headquarters
- Controlled by: United Kingdom

Location
- Coordinates: 50.805253°N 0.057715°E

Site history
- In use: 1940-1945

Garrison information
- Garrison: Royal Navy

HMS Forward was a shore establishment of the British Royal Navy during World War II. It was based at South Heighton, just outside Newhaven, East Sussex.

== Service history ==
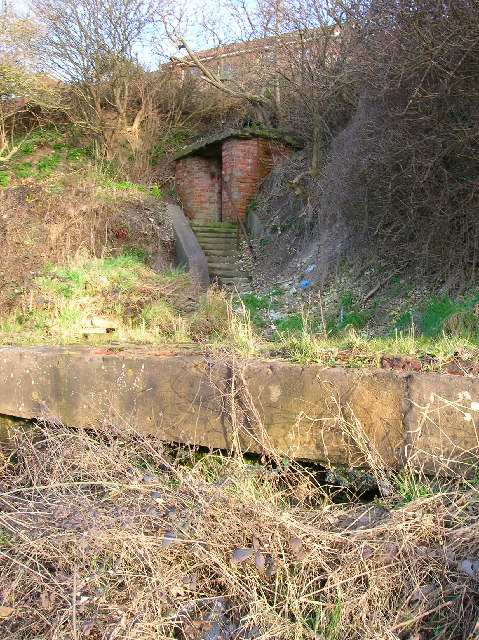
Western entrance, now overgrown

Based in a former Guinness Trust Holiday Home, Forward served as the command centre for all Royal Naval establishments in the area and was responsible for:

- HMS Marlborough, the Electrical Training School at Eastbourne.
- HMS Forward II (renamed HMS Aggressive in 1942), the Coastal Forces base at Newhaven.
- The Combined Operations Landing Craft bases of HMS Newt at Newhaven and HMS Lizard at Shoreham and Hove.
- HMS Vernon (R), the Torpedo, Mining & Electrical Training Establishment at Roedean School, Brighton.

In 1941 a complex of tunnels were constructed 20 m (66 ft) underground to house a centre which plotted all shipping traffic in the English Channel between Dungeness and Selsey Bill, in conjunction with the coastal radar chain.

Forward was decommissioned on 31 August 1945.
