= HMS Mercia =

Former Royal Navy shore establishment in Coventry, England

HMS Mercia was a shore establishment of the Royal Navy based in Smith Street, Coventry, England. It functioned as a communications training centre.

The ship was commissioned on 1 October 1984, and paid off on 29 July 1994, when the ship's company were moved to HMS Forward in nearby Birmingham.

When HMS Mercia was decommissioned, her ship's bell was presented to Coventry Cathedral.
