= HMS Warrior =

At least five ships and one shore establishment of the Royal Navy have been named HMS Warrior:

- HMS Warrior (1781) was a 74-gun third-rate ship of the line launched in 1781. She became a receiving ship after 1818, a convict ship after 1840, and was broken up in 1857.
- HMS Warrior (1860) was the Royal Navy's first ironclad ocean-going armoured warship and world's first iron-hulled ironclad, and was launched in 1860. She became a depot ship in 1902, was renamed HMS Vernon III in 1904, and hulked as HMS Warrior in 1923. She was handed over for preservation as Warrior in 1979, and is preserved at Portsmouth as a museum ship.
- HMS Warrior (1905) was a Warrior-class armoured cruiser launched in 1905. She was disabled at the Battle of Jutland in 1916 and foundered a day later.
- HMS Warrior (1917) was a yacht requisitioned by the Royal Navy in 1917 and 1918
- HMS Warrior (R31) was a Colossus-class light fleet aircraft carrier launched in 1944, having had her name changed from HMS Brave in 1942. She was loaned to Canada from 1946 to 1948, as HMCS Warrior, then sold to Argentina and renamed ARA Independencia in 1958.
- HMS Warrior was the name assigned to the operational headquarters of the Royal Navy in Northwood, London from 1963. The base became the Joint Headquarters in 1996, before being decommissioned in 1999 to become the Joint Services Headquarters.
