= HMS Goldcrest =

A number of shore establishments of the Royal Navy, used by the Fleet Air Arm, have borne the name HMS Goldcrest.

- RNAS Angle was an airbase of the Fleet Air Arm, located near the village of Angle, Pembrokeshire, in Wales, between May and September in 1943. Either side of those dates it was RAF Angle, a Royal Air Force station.
- RNAS Dale was a Fleet Air Arm airbase situated next to the village of Dale, Pembrokeshire, in Wales, between 1943 and 1948.
- RNAS Brawdy was a Royal Naval Air Station between 1946 and 1971, situated next to the village and community of Brawdy in Pembrokeshire, Wales.
