= HMS Wildfire (2000 shore establishment) =

Maritime Reserves Royal Navy Unit in London, England

History

United Kingdom
- Name: HMS Wildfire
- Commissioned: May 2000
- Status: Currently operational
- Badge

General characteristics
- Class & type: Stone frigate

HMS Wildfire is a Royal Naval Reserve unit in Northwood, North West London. Training just under 100 reservists, HMS Wildfire is located within a purpose built training facility inside the national military tri-service HQ and NATO base.

== History ==
Descended from a long a line of HMS Wildfires since the 1760s, the current unit was commissioned as HMS Northwood in 1957 to support the growing NATO headquarters of Commander-in-Chief, Eastern Atlantic Area (CINCEASTLANT) at Northwood.

Housed initially within Northwood Headquarters, the unit occupied a series of huts until in 1988 the unit moved to Brackenhill House, an Edwardian mansion situated 250 yards (230 m) from the main gate of Northwood Headquarters/HMS Warrior. In May 2000 HMS Northwood decommissioned and was commissioned as HMS Wildfire.

As part of the redevelopment of the base HMS Wildfire returned to the main base into a modern purpose built facility. On 11 June 2011, the Ships company formally marched from Brackenhill House to the Northwood base behind the RM Band Portsmouth and was inspected by Commander-in-Chief Fleet, Admiral Sir Trevor Soar.

== Commanding officer ==
The current commanding officer of HMS Wildfire is Lieutenant Commander Ian Dorward.
