= HMS Abatos =

Royal Navy shore establishment

Coordinates: 50.893°N 1.378°W

History

United Kingdom
- Name: HMS Abatos
- Commissioned: 21 September 1943
- Decommissioned: March 1946
- Fate: Decommissioned and closed down

General characteristics
- Class & type: Stone frigate

HMS Abatos was a Royal Navy shore establishment responsible for the planning of Operation Pluto, the construction of the undersea pipeline that supplied the Allied troops with fuel during the liberation of Europe in 1944, after D-Day. There was another Operation Pluto training establishment at Tilbury, under the name HMS Abastor.

The Admiralty requisitioned the remains of the Supermarine factory in Woolston, Southampton in 1943. The base was commissioned on 21 September 1943 as a tender to HMS Shrapnel. Just before D-Day, the force established headquarters at 21 Upper Vicarage Road, Woolston The headquarters had shifted to Norfolk House by 1945, and moved again on 26 November 1945 to Rex House. Abatos was paid off in March 1946, though no new appointments had been made in the navy list of October 1945. The establishment had one designated depot ship, the Naval Auxiliary Boat Gondolier Prince.
