= HMS Kestrel =

Four ships and a shore establishment of the Royal Navy have borne the name HMS Kestrel, after the bird of prey, the kestrel:

Ships

- HMS Kestrel (1846) was a brigantine purchased in 1846 and broken up in 1852.
- HMS Kestrel (1856) was a Clown-class wooden screw gunboat launched in 1856, sunk in action in 1859, raised, and resold in 1866 to the Japanese Navy.
- HMS Kestrel (1872) was a Frolic-class gunvessel launched in 1872 and sold in 1888.
- HMS Kestrel (1898) was a Brazen-class destroyer launched in 1898 and sold in 1921.

Shore establishment

- HMS Kestrel (shore establishment) was a Royal Naval Air Station and General Service Establishment at Worthy Down, near Winchester. It was commissioned in 1939 after being transferred from the Royal Air Force, and was paid off in 1948, before being recommissioned as a General Service Establishment. It was paid off to Care and Maintenance in 1950 and renamed HMS Ariel in 1952.
