= HMS Nelson (shore establishment) =

Naval barracks for the Royal Navy

Coordinates: 50°47′58″N 1°05′47″W

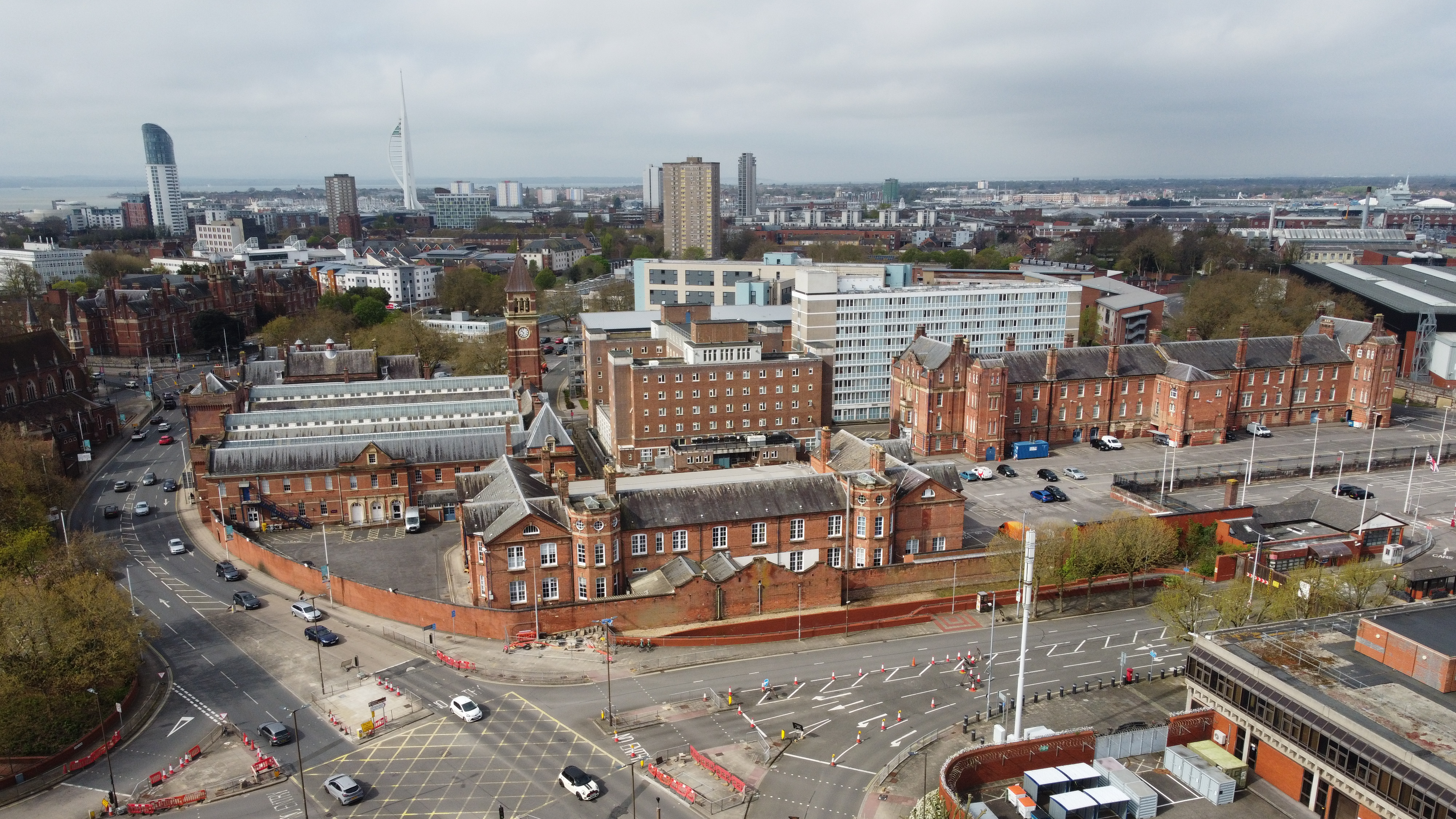
- Aerial view of HMS Nelson
- Active: 1847 – present
- Country: United Kingdom
- Branch: Royal Navy
- Type: Barracks
- Role: Residential
- Part of: HMNB Portsmouth

HMS Nelson is a stone frigate (shore establishment) of the Royal Navy on Queen Street in Portsmouth, England. It provides the naval barracks to support HMNB Portsmouth and is also home to the Royal Marines School of Music.

== History ==
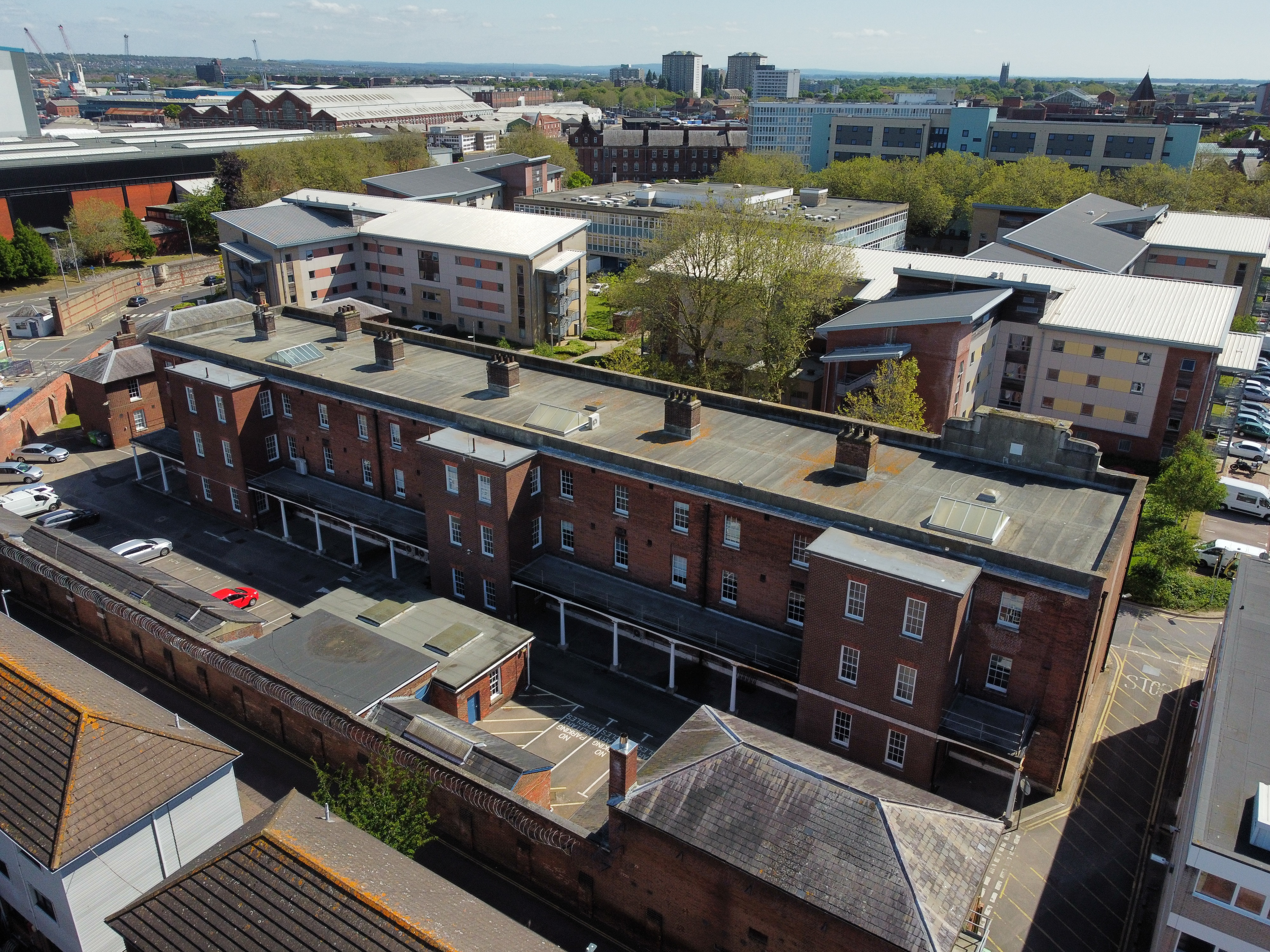
'Rodney': a partially-surviving block from the army barracks of 1847. (The southern half of the building was destroyed in the Second World War).

In 1847 a barracks was built within the Duke of York bastion of the 18th-century Portsea fortifications, east of the dockyard, to house troops manning the town's defences. It was named Anglesey (or Anglesea) Barracks. The bastion was demolished between 1870 and 1876.

In 1899 the Admiralty purchased these barracks from the War Office and constructed a Naval Barracks on the site, designed by Colonel Sir Henry Pilkington RE. Prior to this, Royal Navy personnel in Portsmouth had been accommodated either on commissioned vessels or in hulks. Opened in 1903, the barracks were commissioned as HMS Victory, but renamed HMS Nelson in 1974 to avoid confusion with the flagship.

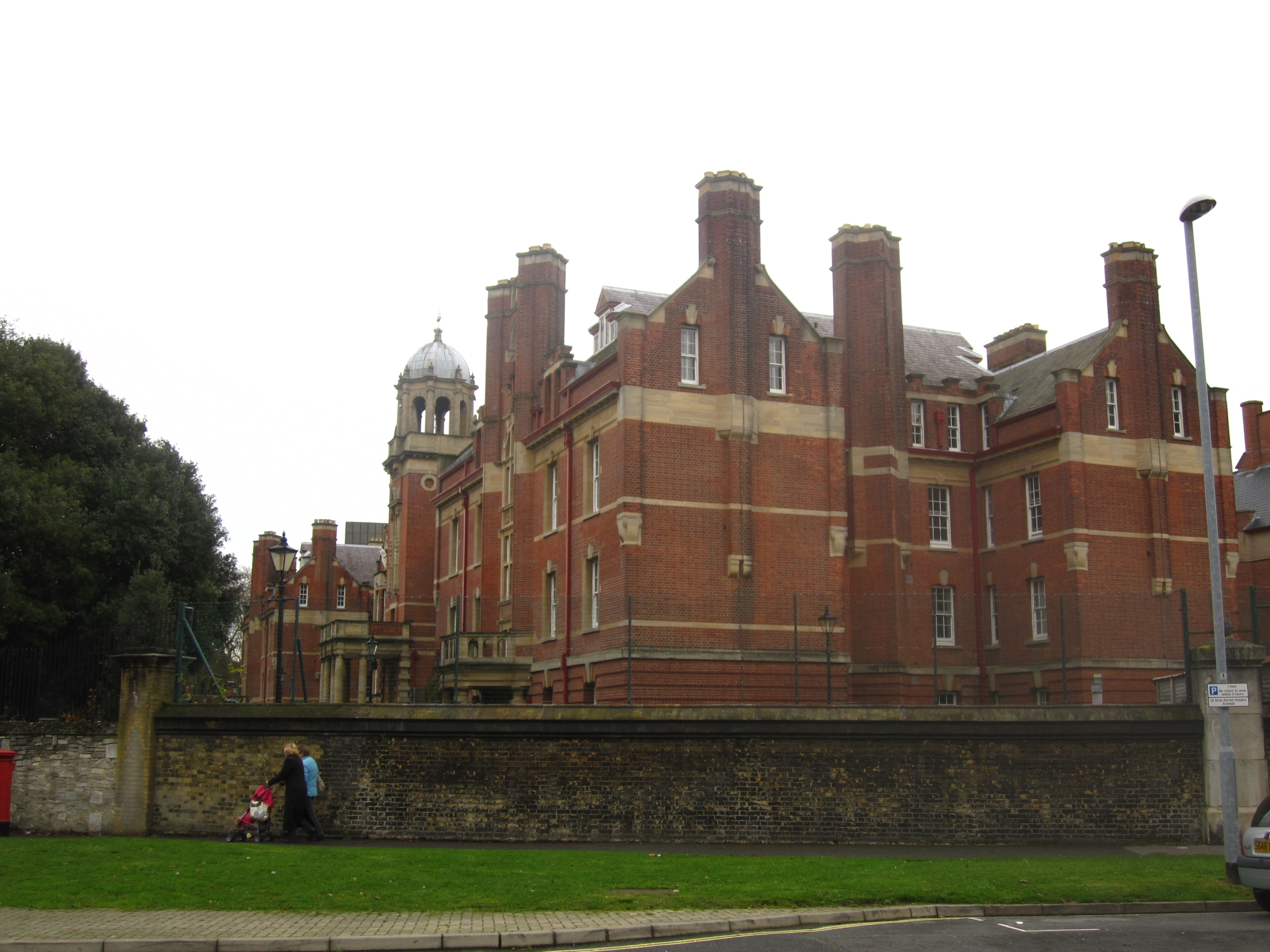
The wardroom on the south side of Queen Street

A wardroom block (with accommodation for officers) was built across the road, on the south side of Queen Street, on the site of the old garrison hospital. It was designed in the Baroque Revival style, built in red brick with stone dressings and also completed in 1903. The design involved a seven bay central section facing into Queen Street. It featured a three stage entrance tower in the central bay: the first stage was blind with external staircases on either side; the second stage involved a tetrastyle portico formed by Tuscan order columns supporting an entablature; the third stage consisted of a two-storey window with a pediment, and the whole structure was surmounted by parapet and a cupola with Ionic order columns surmounted by a dome. There were oriel windows in the outer bays. Internally, the principal rooms included the entrance hall which was decorated with fine paintings by Harold Wyllie depicting the Glorious First of June and the Battle of Copenhagen.

In 1906 the nearby Holy Trinity Parish Church was purchased and brought inside the perimeter wall; for a time it functioned as the RN Barracks chapel, but it was destroyed by bombs in the Second World War. Just to the north-west, Anchor Gate House was built in 1898 to house the Commodore of the Barracks.

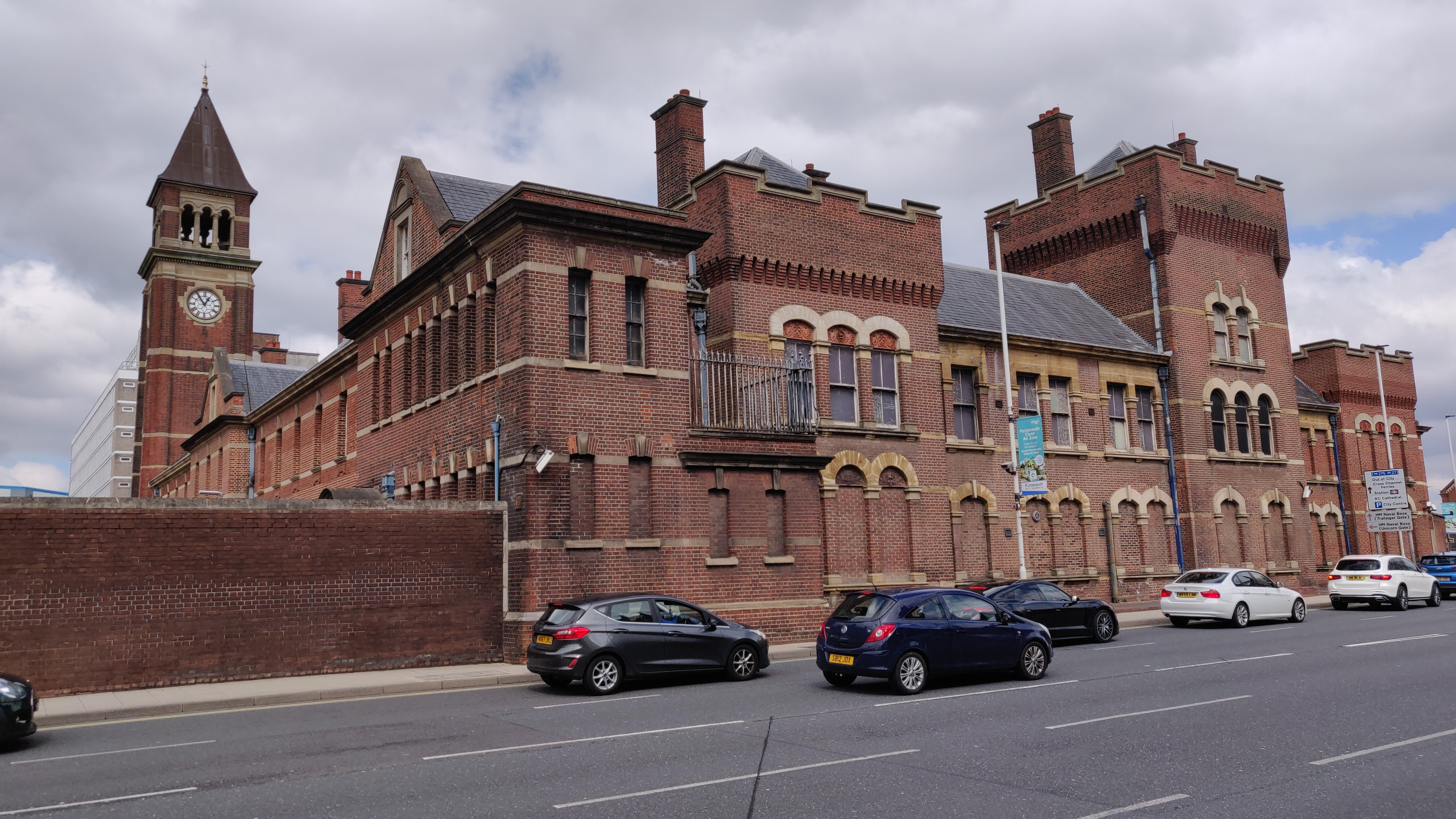
HMS Nelson: former drill hall (1893), now the gymnasium; originally built for the 3rd Volunteer Battalion, Hampshire Regiment.

Several barrack blocks were demolished and rebuilt in the latter half of the 20th century, but a number of original buildings remain including the canteen (Eastney block), the drill hall and gymnasium, Jervis block (formerly Seamen's Quarters), Barham block (formerly Depot Offices) and the wardroom. In addition, one barrack block remains, along with its adjacent canteen building, from the earlier Army barracks (Anglesey Barracks) which formerly stood on the site. Nearby, the associated garrison prison (which later served as the Naval Detention Centre) is now home to the Royal Marines School of Music.

In November 2016 the Ministry of Defence published A Better Defence Estate, which indicated that the HMS Nelson wardroom would be disposed of by 2021; three years later, however, the disposal date was deferred.
