= HMS Flying Fox (shore establishment) =

Royal Naval Reserve unit in Bristol, England

Coordinates: 51.4344°N 2.6165°W

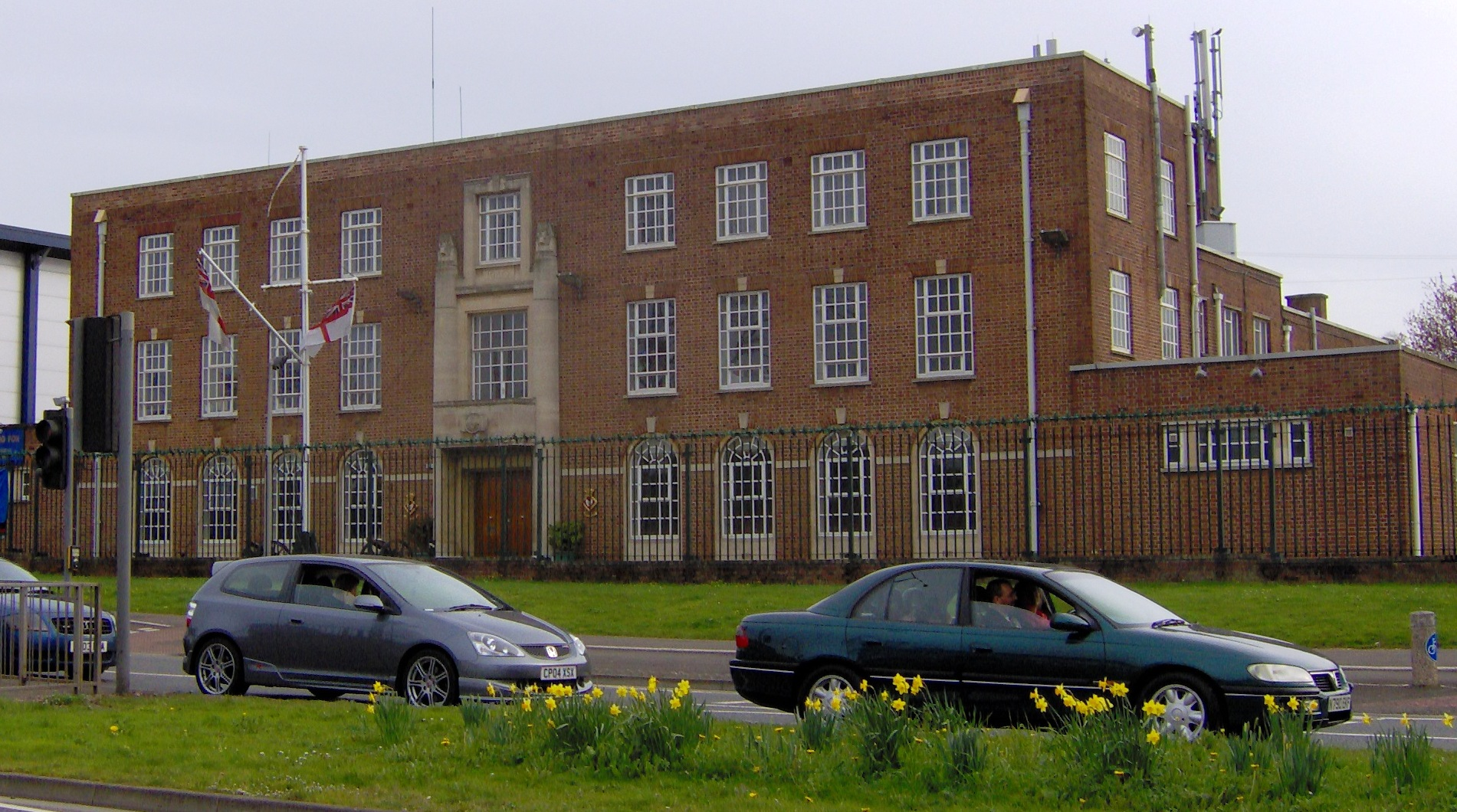
- Flying Fox in 2007

History

United Kingdom
- Name: HMS Flying Fox
- Commissioned: 18 November 1972
- Status: Active
- Badge

General characteristics
- Class & type: Stone frigate

HMS Flying Fox is a Royal Naval Reserve unit located in Bristol, England. Training over 100 reservists on Thursday evenings in Bristol, Flying Fox serves Bristol, Dorset, Devon, Somerset, Wiltshire and Gloucestershire.

== History ==
Bristol Division was one of the five divisions of the Royal Naval Volunteer Reserve formed in 1903. After the First World War the division was reformed and a new drill ship, the 24-class sloop HMS Flying Fox, was berthed at Bristol in 1924. Renamed Severn Division after the Second World War, HMS Flying Fox moved ashore to its present HQ in 1972. The ship itself was towed down the River Avon and across the Bristol Channel to a ship breaker's yard in Cardiff in 1973.

In July 2023, the headquarters of the Royal Marines Reserve moved out of Dorset House so as to co-locate with the Royal Naval Reserve at HMS Flying Fox in Winterstoke Road.

== Based units ==
Co-located on the site in Winterstoke Road are the Naval Regional Officer for Wales and West of England, the University Royal Naval Unit (URNU) Bristol, the South West Area Sea Cadet HQ, Winterstoke Detachment of Bristol Army Cadet Force, and the regional headquarters of the Royal Marines Reserve.
