= HMS Godwit =

Two shore establishments of the Royal Navy, used by the Fleet Air Arm, have borne the name HMS Godwit.

- HMS Godwit (1943 shore establishment), RNAS Hinstock was a Royal Naval Air Station between 1942 and 1947, near Market Drayton, Shropshire.
- HMS Godwit (1947 shore establishment), RNAS Peplow was a Royal Naval Air Station between 1945 and 1949, although it was commissioned HMS Godwit II between 1945 and 1947. Also located near Market Drayton, Shropshire.
