= HMS Dalriada =

Royal Naval Reserve unit in Glasgow, Scotland

Coordinates: 55.85510°N 4.31859°W

History

United Kingdom
- Name: HMS Dalriada
- Commissioned: 1965
- Status: Extant
- Badge

General characteristics
- Class & type: Stone frigate

HMS Dalriada is Glasgow's Royal Naval Reserve unit. It is based in Govan, one of the city's southwestern suburbs.

== History ==
HMS Dalriada was established as a Royal Naval Reserve Headquarters Unit for Greenock and the Firth of Clyde, Scotland in 1965 and originally occupied former air defence buildings on the outskirts of Inverkip. Dalriada remained in Inverkip until 1982, when the unit moved to the Navy Buildings in Greenock, on the site of the former gun battery at Fort Matilda. The unit moved to Govan in 2013.

Dalriada was named after the 6-7th-century Gaelic over-kingdom Dál Riata in which modern Greenock is located. The Ship's Badge of Dalriada has the boar's head of Clan Campbell (who occupied the territory of the ancient Dál Riata Kingdom in the High Middle Ages) with a Celtic torc and surmounted with a coronet. The letters R N R surround the device and all is enclosed within a diamond surmounted in turn by a plaque with the ship's name and above that the Naval Crown.

The principal RNR unit in Glasgow and the West of Scotland had been, since 1903, HMS Graham, (Clyde Division RNR) based at Whitefield Road in Govan. At that time RNR Divisional HQs such as HMS Graham were considered senior to HQ Units such as HMS Dalriada, especially in having greater numbers of Reservists and RN Staff attached and in operating active Ton Class Minesweepers as part of the Tenth Mine Counter Measure Squadron. Initially Dalriada had been set up as a tender unit to HMS Graham on which it relied for administrative and other functions.

The 1990 Options for Change changes in RNR Force sizes saw the closure of HMS Graham and the refocusing of the RNR in the West of Scotland on HMS Dalriada. This left Glasgow City without an RNR presence, and the Govan site was handed over to the Army for use by the Territorial Army's 205 (Scottish) Field Hospital of the 2nd Medical Group.

After some years the RNR presence in the City of Glasgow was restored through the creation of a satellite unit to HMS Dalriada – Govan Division (but not located on the site of the old HMS Graham which remains in Army hands). In April 2013, Dalriada moved to Govan, subsuming its satellite unit and co-locating with the Royal Marines Reserve Glasgow Detachment.

Members of HMS Dalriada often take part in ceremonial events hosted by the city of Glasgow, often alongside their regular counterparts from HMS Neptune, HMNB Clyde. During the Glasgow 2014 Commonwealth Games, Dalriada provided personnel to supplement Police Scotland's security operation. Many of the unit's members also took part in flag raising and medal presentation ceremonies as part of the event.

== See also ==
- Armed forces in Scotland
- Military history of Scotland
