= HMS King Alfred (1994 shore establishment) =

Royal Naval Reserve unit in Portsmouth, England

Coordinates: 50.8141°N 1.0988°W

History

United Kingdom
- Name: HMS King Alfred
- Commissioned: 8 June 1994
- Status: Active
- Badge

General characteristics
- Class & type: Stone frigate

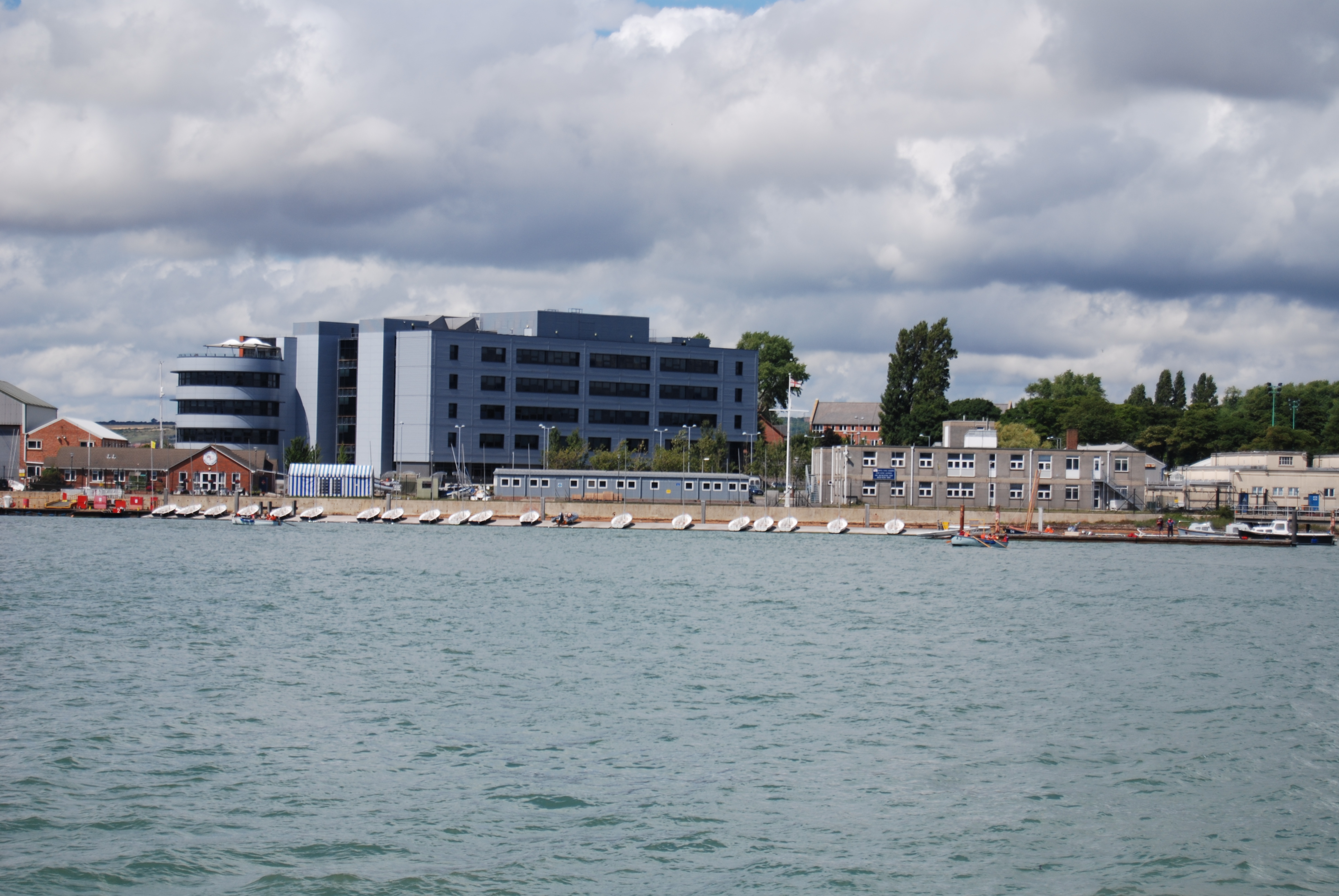
HMS King Alfred in the foreground

HMS King Alfred is a Royal Naval Reserve shore establishment in Portsmouth, England. The unit has a complement of over 200 reservists and provides training facilities to other lodger units, including the local Royal Marines Reserve (RMR) City of London (Portsmouth Detachment), and local University Royal Naval Unit (URNU).

HMS King Alfred previously opened on 1 April 1994 on Whale Island and was commissioned on 8 June that year, replacing the closed units at HMS Sussex and HMS Wessex. In April 2021, it moved to the renovated "Semaphore Tower", within HMNB Portsmouth.

The unit is affiliated with University Royal Naval Unit Solent and Bearwood College Combined Cadet Force and provides local representation at events including the Ship Festival, in Chichester; and the Remembrance Sunday services in Portsmouth and Hove. Members of the unit are also honorary freedom holders of the City of Portsmouth. Penny Mordaunt, the local MP and former Secretary of State for Defence, was an acting sub-lieutenant there from 2010 until 2015.
