= Seafield Park, Hampshire =

Former Royal Navy shore establishment for training

Seafield Park
- Part of HMS Ariel
- Stubbington, Hampshire in England

Site information
- Type: Shore establishment
- Owner: Ministry of Defence
- Operator: Royal Navy
- Part of: HMS Ariel

Location
- Shown within Hampshire Seafield Park (the United Kingdom)
- Coordinates: 50°48′59″N 001°13′18″W

Site history
- Built: 1955
- In use: 1955-1991

Garrison information
- Garrison: Royal Navy
- Occupants: Air Medical School; Safety Equipment and Survival Training School; Central Air Medical Board; Naval Aircrew Advisory Board; Naval Aircraft and Marine Examination Board
- Source: Royal Navy Research Archive

Seafield Park a former Royal Navy shore establishment located near to now former RNAS Lee-on-Solent, Hampshire

== Units ==
The following units were here at some point:

- RN Air Medical School
- Royal Navy Survival Equipment School
