= HMS Abastor =

Royal Navy training establishment

History

United Kingdom
- Name: HMS Abastor
- Commissioned: 1 November 1943
- Decommissioned: 17 October 1945
- Fate: Decommissioned and closed down

General characteristics
- Class & type: Stone frigate

HMS Abastor was a shore establishment of the Royal Navy at Tilbury used for the planning of Operation Pluto, which laid undersea pipelines to supplied the allied troops with fuel during the liberation of Europe in 1944. Another Pluto training establishment at Woolston, Southampton, was given the similar name HMS Abatos.

Abastor's nominal depot ship was the NAB Interlude (43627), a Naval Auxiliary Boat which took the form of a petrol-driven harbour launch. It was in service as a depot ship from 1st November 1943 to July 1945, then transferred back to being a harbour launch.
