= HMS Bellerophon =

Four ships of the Royal Navy have been named HMS Bellerophon after the hero Bellerophon in Greek mythology. The name was also initially intended for two Minotaur-class cruisers, but in both cases the ship was renamed at an early stage.

- HMS Bellerophon (1786), nicknamed the "Billy Ruffian", was a 74-gun third rate launched in 1786 that fought at the Battle of Trafalgar in 1805. She became a prison ship in 1815, was renamed HMS Captivity in 1824, and was sold in 1836.
- HMS Waterloo (1818), was an 80-gun third rate, originally named HMS Talavera but renamed HMS Waterloo before her launch in 1818. She was renamed HMS Bellerophon in 1824, relegated to harbour service in 1848. She then saw active service at Sebastopol during the Crimean War 1854–1856. Her gun crews manned off-loaded guns ashore and were nicknamed "The Bellerophon Doves". She sustained some damage during the bombardment of Sebastopol and was finally sold for breaking up in 1892.
- HMS Bellerophon (1865) was an ironclad battleship launched in 1865. She was renamed Indus III in 1904 and used for training, and was sold in 1922.
- HMS Bellerophon (1907) was a Bellerophon-class dreadnought battleship launched in 1907. She saw service in the First World War, including the Battle of Jutland, and was sold for breaking up in 1921.
- The name was also to be used for a Minotaur-class cruiser ordered in 1942, but the ship was renamed HMS Blake before construction started in 1944.
- Subsequently, the name was again to be used for another ship of the same class, which was renamed HMS Tiger in 1945 whilst under construction and was launched later that year.

== See also ==
- HMS Bellerophon, a former Royal Navy shore establishment in Portsmouth, Hampshire, England.
