= South Heighton =

Suburb of Newhaven, Sussex, England

Coordinates: 50.81°N 0.05°E

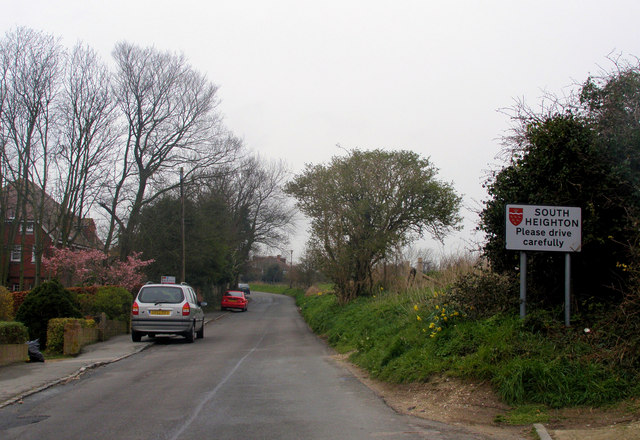

- Location within East Sussex
- Area: 8.5 km^{2} (3.3 sq mi)
- Population: 990 (Parish-2011)
  - Density: 338/sq mi (131/km^{2})
- OS grid reference: TQ448027
  - London: 49 miles (79 km) N
- District: Lewes
- Shire county: East Sussex
- Region: South East
- Country: England
- Sovereign state: United Kingdom
- Post town: NEWHAVEN
- Postcode district: BN9
- Dialling code: 01273
- Police: Sussex
- Fire: East Sussex
- Ambulance: South East Coast
- UK Parliament: Lewes
- Website: http://www.southheighton.org/

South Heighton is a village and civil parish in the Lewes District of East Sussex, England. The village is seven miles (11 km) south of Lewes. In the 1890s the village's population grew from less than 100 to over 500 after a cement manufacturing plant opened nearby. The village is now associated with the urbanised area of Newhaven.

There is no place called North Heighton although part of the South Downs above the village is called Heighton Hill, from which one can get to Norton, which lies north-east of South Heighton, and north of Bishopstone.

It is a regular thoroughfare and point of rest for ramblers, and features a series of ponds, known locally as 'The Three Lakes', which were until the early 1990s open to the public. It remains a popular destination for local visitors, with its public house, The Hampden Arms, and until recently, its corner-shop and post office, which has now closed and been converted into a residential dwelling. South Heighton is one of many villages in the area which maintains a bonfire society, celebration and parade.

South Heighton is famous for its secret tunnels, built and used for defence during the Second World War, which lie underneath most of the village, with the main entrance at Denton House. In 1998, when work finished on the conversion of Denton House into flats and of the surrounding area into houses, the road was called Forward Close, after the ship associated with Newhaven and the secret tunnels, HMS Forward.

Notable residents, past and present, include Ralph Reader, originator of the Scouting Gang Show and Ursula Mommens, the great-granddaughter of Charles Darwin and the great-great-granddaughter of the potter Josiah Wedgwood.

== Governance ==
On a local level, South Heighton is governed by the South Heighton Parish Council. Council meetings are held every six weeks in the South Heighton village hall. Their responsibilities include footpaths, street lighting, playgrounds and minor planning applications. The parish council has seven seats available.

The next level of government is the district council. The parish of South Heighton lies within the Ouse Valley and Ringmer ward of Lewes District Council which returns three seats to the council.

East Sussex County Council is the next tier of government, for which South Heighton is within the Ouse Valley East division, with responsibility for Education, Libraries, Social Services, Civil Registration, Trading Standards and Transport. Elections for the County Council are held every four years.

South Heighton is represented in the UK Parliament by the Lewes constituency. The current serving MP is the Liberal Democrat James MacCleary who won the seat in the 2024 general election.
