= HMS Cambridge (shore establishment) =

British naval establishment (1956–2001)

Coordinates: 50.319477°N 4.106212°W

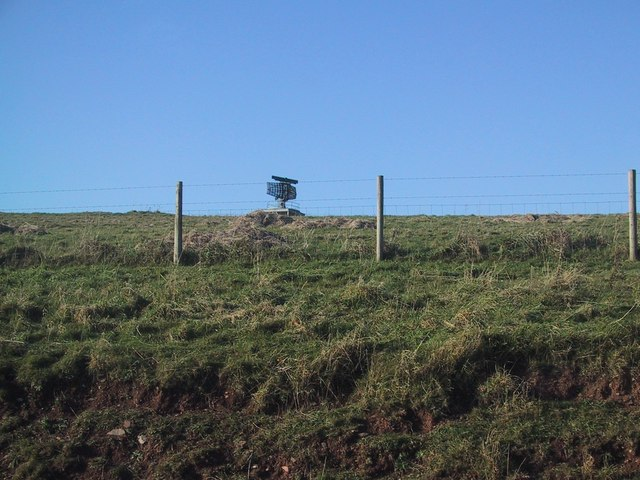
Radar Station on the site of HMS Cambridge

HMS Cambridge was a Royal Navy shore establishment south of Plymouth UK, commissioned between 1956 and 2001. Formerly named HM Gunnery School, Devonport, then Cambridge Gunnery School at Wembury.

The site was called HMS Cambridge after a ship of the same name an 80-gun third-rate ship of the line that was used to train seamen in gunnery in Plymouth harbour from 1856. She was replaced by the first rate HMS Windsor Castle (renamed HMS Cambridge) in 1869 before the gunnery school was moved onto land at the Plymouth naval barracks in 1907. This lasted until 1940 when a gunnery range used by the army and navy was opened at the old Wembury Point Holiday Camp (on the present site) which was named the Cambridge Gunnery School. In 1956 the school was commissioned as an independent shore establishment and was decommissioned on 30 March 2001.

The site was purchased in 2006 by the National Trust; the main installation, which included mounts for a range of standard naval guns, was demolished and cleared, and the site returned to nature.
