= HMS Robin =

Two ships and a shore establishment of the Royal Navy have borne the name HMS Robin, after the European robin, a type of bird:

- HMS Robin (1897) was a Heron-class gunboat, built in sections in 1897 and erected in Hong Kong. She was sold in 1928.
- HMS Robin (T65) was a river gunboat, launched in 1934 and scuttled in 1941.
- HMS Robin (1943 shore establishment) was a naval air station of the Royal Navy, commissioned in 1943 at RNAS Kirkwall as a tender to HMS Sparrowhawk. It became an independent command in 1944 and 'paid off' in 1945.
