= HMS Ariel =

Nine ships of the Royal Navy have borne the name HMS Ariel, possibly after the archangel Ariel in Judeo-Christian mysticism, but certainly influenced by Shakespeare's "airy spirit" of the same name:

- HMS Ariel (1777), a 20-gun sixth rate launched in 1777, captured by the French ship Amazone in 1779 and lent to the Americans as USS Ariel until 1781. She was lost in 1793.
- HMS Ariel (1781), a 16-gun sloop launched in 1781. laid up in 1792, offered for sale in 1795, and sold in 1802.
- HMS Ariel (1806), an 18-gun sloop launched in 1806 and sold in 1816.
- HMS Ariel (1820), a Cherokee-class brig-sloop launched in 1820 and wrecked in 1828 on Sable Island. She had become a Post Office packet in 1826, sailing from Falmouth. Cornwall. On 10 November 1828, she sailed from Falmouth under the command of Lieutenant John Figg (RN). In December a schooner saw her off Sable Island but was unable to warn her off and it was believed that she wrecked a few hours later. All aboard Ariel died.
- HMS Ariel (1837), a wooden paddle packet launched in 1822 and transferred to the Navy from the General Post Office in 1837, where she had been named Arrow. She was sold back into mercantile service in 1850.
- HMS Ariel (1854), a wood screw sloop launched in 1854 and sold in 1865.
- HMS Ariel (1873), a second class gunboat launched in 1873, transferred to the coastguard in 1877 and sold in 1889.
- HMS Ariel (1897), a D-class destroyer launched in 1897 and wrecked in 1907 at Malta.
- HMS Ariel (1911), an Acheron-class destroyer launched in 1911 and sunk in 1918 in the North Sea.

Ariel has also been the name of three naval training shore establishment:

- HMS Ariel (1942 shore establishment), RN Air Training Establishment (RNATE) Culcheth, Warrington, Cheshire, from October 1942 to July 1952. Was home to the Naval and WRNS Radio Mechanics technical training, the Radio Mechanics (Air) Pool, the Air Radio Repair and Test Centre, the Naval Air Radio Maintenance Groups HQ and the Air Electrical School.
- HMS Ariel (1952 shore establishment), RNAS Worthy Down, Winchester, Hampshire from July 1952 to November 1960, home of the RN Air Electrical School.
- HMS Ariel (1959 shore establishment), RNAS Lee-on-Solent, Hampshire between November 1959 and October 1965, home of the RN Air Electrical School. It had been named HMS Daedalus, but was renamed Ariel in 1959. It had a sister site called Seafield Park. The name reverted to HMS Daedalus in 1965.

Also:

- HCS Ariel, was a 14-gun brig launched in Bombay in 1809 for the naval arm of the British East India Company. She foundered on 12 March 1820.
