= HMS Benbow =

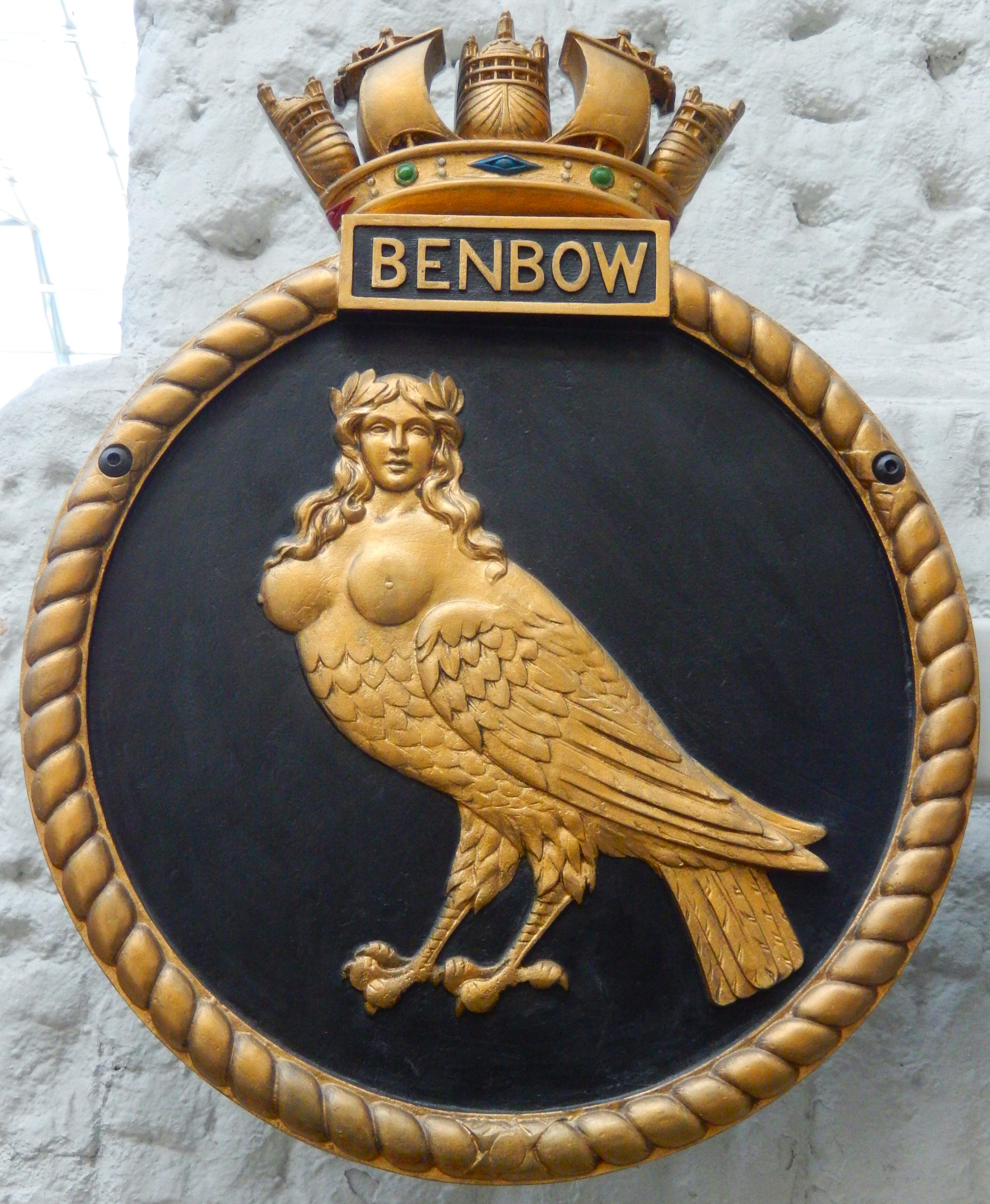
Badge of HMS Benbow

Three ships of the Royal Navy have been named HMS Benbow, after Admiral John Benbow:

- HMS Benbow (1813) was a 74-gun third-rate ship of the line, built in 1813. She was converted to a coal hulk in 1859 and broken up in 1895.
- HMS Benbow (1885) was an Admiral-class battleship launched in 1885 and scrapped in 1909.
- HMS Benbow (1913) was an Iron Duke-class battleship launched in 1913. She fought in the Battle of Jutland and was scrapped in 1931.

== See also ==
- HMS Benbow, a Royal Navy shore establishment in Trinidad.
