= HMS Sherwood (shore establishment) =

Royal Naval Reserve shore establishment

Coordinates: 52°54′35.4″N 1°15′22.8″W

- Foresters House, Chetwynd Barracks, Nottingham
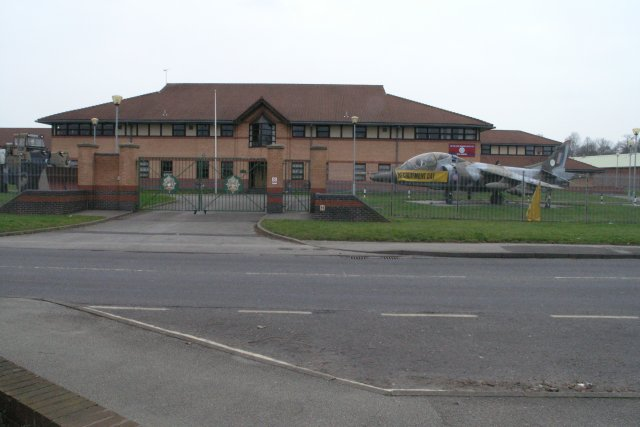

Site information
- Type: Stone frigate
- Owner: Ministry of Defence
- Operator: Royal Navy

Site history
- In use: 1984–present

Garrison information
- Current commander: Commander Sacha Brooks

HMS Sherwood is a Royal Naval Reserve stone frigate in Chilwell, Nottinghamshire, England.

The first naval reserve unit was established in Nottingham in 1949. It was commissioned as Sherwood in 1984, at which time the unit was based at Chalfont Drive, Beechdale. In 2014, HMS Sherwood moved to Foresters House, Chetwynd Barracks, where it was co-located with an Army Reserve unit, and a Royal Marines Reserve detachment. Sherwood was honoured by receiving the freedom of the city of Nottingham in 2018.

== History ==
The establishment shares its name with HMS Sherwood, the former USS Rodgers, a Clemson-class destroyer transferred from the US Navy to the Royal Navy as part of the destroyers-for-bases deal in 1940. During the Second World War Sherwood served on convoy escort duty, in the hunt for the German cruiser Admiral Scheer following the attack on convoy HX 84 and in the hunt for the battleship Bismarck. She was scrapped in 1945.

The first naval reserve unit in Nottingham, a signals unit, was established in 1949 in the city centre; the unit relocated to Carrington Street in 1961.

=== Move to Chalfont Drive ===
The Nottingham Royal Naval Reserve unit moved to Chalfont Drive, Beechdale, (also the site of a Civil Defence regional seat of government) in 1984 and was commissioned as HMS Sherwood. Elements of Sherwood were mobilised to serve on active duty in Operation Herrick (Afghanistan 2002–2014) and Operation Telic (Iraq 2003–2011). Members also served during the 2012 Olympic Games in London and with British Forces Gibraltar. In 2007 a Royal Marines Reserve detachment was formed at Sherwood. The Chalfont Road site was identified as one of three Royal Naval Reserve (RNR) sites surplus to requirements in 2013.

=== Move to Chetwynd Barracks ===
HMS Sherwood relocated to Foresters House, Chilwell (part of Chetwynd Barracks) in 2014.

HMS Sherwood remains active on the site, which is located more than 50 miles (80 km) from the coast; it is the only RNR establishment in the East Midlands. It is co-located, with a unit of the Army Reserve (350 (Sherwood Foresters) Field Squadron (EOD&S)).

In May 2018, HMS Sherwood was awarded the freedom of the city of Nottingham, becoming only the seventh RNR unit to receive such an honour. To mark the honour, the unit marched through the city in the traditional manner with drums beating, colours flying, and bayonets fixed on 2 June 2018. They were accompanied by members of the Sea Cadets and veterans of the unit and its ship namesake. On the same day a Nottingham City Transport bus was renamed "HMS Sherwood", at the suggestion of a member of the unit who worked in the company's operations centre.

In 2021, reservists from HMS Sherwood mobilised on HMS Queen Elizabeth’s first global Carrier Strike deployment and supported Operation Rescript; the British military's operation to help tackle the COVID-19 pandemic.

On 5 November 2024, Commander Kathryn Jacques passed command of HMS Sherwood to Commander Sacha Brooks.

Chetwynd Barracks is set to close in 2026. However Foresters House, the site of HMS Sherwood and an Army Reserve Centre, will be retained.
