= HMS Newt =

British Second World War shore establishment

- Newhaven, East Sussex

Site information
- Type: Combined Operations Base
- Controlled by: United Kingdom

Location
- Coordinates: 50.786165°N 0.052000°E

Site history
- In use: 1942-1945

Garrison information
- Garrison: Royal Navy

HMS Newt was a shore establishment of the Royal Navy during World War II, based at Newhaven, East Sussex.

== Service history ==
It was commissioned on 15 October 1942 as a base for Combined Operations Landing Craft, and consisted of Hards at Seaford and Sleepers Hole (Newhaven Marina), with accommodation on nearby Fort Road. From March 1945 it was used by Naval Parties assigned to "Operation Eclipse" (the capture of ports in northern Germany). Newt was decommissioned on 22 June 1945.
