= HMS Aggressive =

- Newhaven, East Sussex

Site information
- Type: Coastal Forces Base
- Controlled by: United Kingdom

Location
- Coordinates: 50.79050°N 0.054250°E

Site history
- In use: 1941-1945

Garrison information
- Garrison: Royal Navy

HMS Aggressive was a shore establishment of the British Royal Navy during World War II, based at Newhaven, East Sussex.

== Service history ==
Founded in November 1941 as a base for Coastal Forces, it was first named Forward II, but was renamed Aggressive on 4 November 1942. Based at the London & Paris Hotel and at the East Quay, it was decommissioned on 16 April 1945.

From September 1942 Aggressive was the base for the 1st Steam Gun Boat Flotilla, vessels powered by steam turbines, under the command of Peter Scott.

A plaque commemorating the men who served at Aggressive was unveiled on 28 November 2009 at Newhaven Fort.
