= Wandsworth Barracks =

Military installation in Wandsworth, London, England

- Merton Road, Southfields
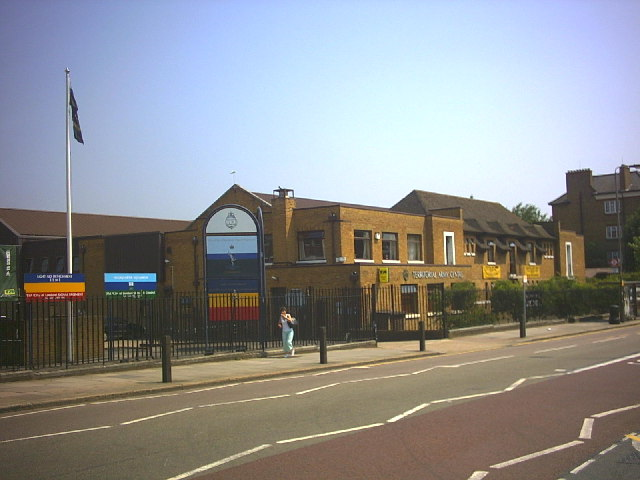
- The barracks in 2005

Site information
- Type: Barracks
- Owner: Ministry of Defence
- Operator: Royal Navy

Location
- Location within Wandsworth
- Coordinates: 51.4438°N 0.1972°W

Site history
- Built: 1939
- Built for: War Office
- In use: 1939–Present

Garrison information
- Occupants: Royal Marines Reserve

Wandsworth Barracks is a military installation on Merton Road, Southfields, London, England. It currently accommodated the regional headquarters of the Royal Marines Reserve.

== History ==
Prior to the dissolution of the monasteries, the site on the east side of Merton Road was occupied by Dunsford Manor which was owned by Merton Priory. The manor was transferred to the ownership of Sir Alan Broderick in the 17th century, and remained in the hands of the Broderick family until the estate was sold in 1851. The site was then acquired by the War Office and was used to accommodate the local Army Forms Depot. The depot was one of a series around the UK responsible for issuing stationery for military use.

In the 1930s, a drill hall was erected on the site. It was a square-shaped brick building with its entrance on the north side. The first occupant was the 27th (London Electrical Engineers) Anti-Aircraft Battalion Royal Engineers. This regiment was transferred to the Royal Artillery as 27 (London Electrical Engineers) Searchlight Regiment Royal Artillery in August 1940. It was deployed to the middle east during the Second World War but was placed in suspended animation at the end of the war. In 1947, the unit was re-formed as 562 (London Electrical Engineers) (Mixed) Light Anti-Aircraft/Searchlight Regiment RA (TA).

Following re-organisation of the Territorial Army in 1967, the drill hall became the home of 83 Squadron, 31st (City of London) Signal Regiment. In 1994, the barracks also became home to the regimental headquarters of 31st (City of London) Signal Regiment. In 2010, the regiment was disbanded following the concurrent disbandment of the 2nd Signal Brigade and the re-organisation of the TA signals as a result of the Army 2020 reform.

In June 2011, the regional headquarters of the Royal Marines Reserve relocated from the drill hall in Old Jamaica Road in Bermondsey to Wandsworth Barracks. The ceremony was attended by the Lord-Lieutenant of Greater London, Sir David Brewer, and the Commandant General Royal Marines, Major General Buster Howes. A series of murals painted by pupils from Southfields Academy depicting historic events involving the Royal Marines was unveiled by the local member of parliament, Justine Greening, on the staircase inside the building in June 2016.
