= HMS Cambria =

Royal Naval Reserve unit in Cardiff, Wales

Coordinates: 51.3985°N 03.2408°W

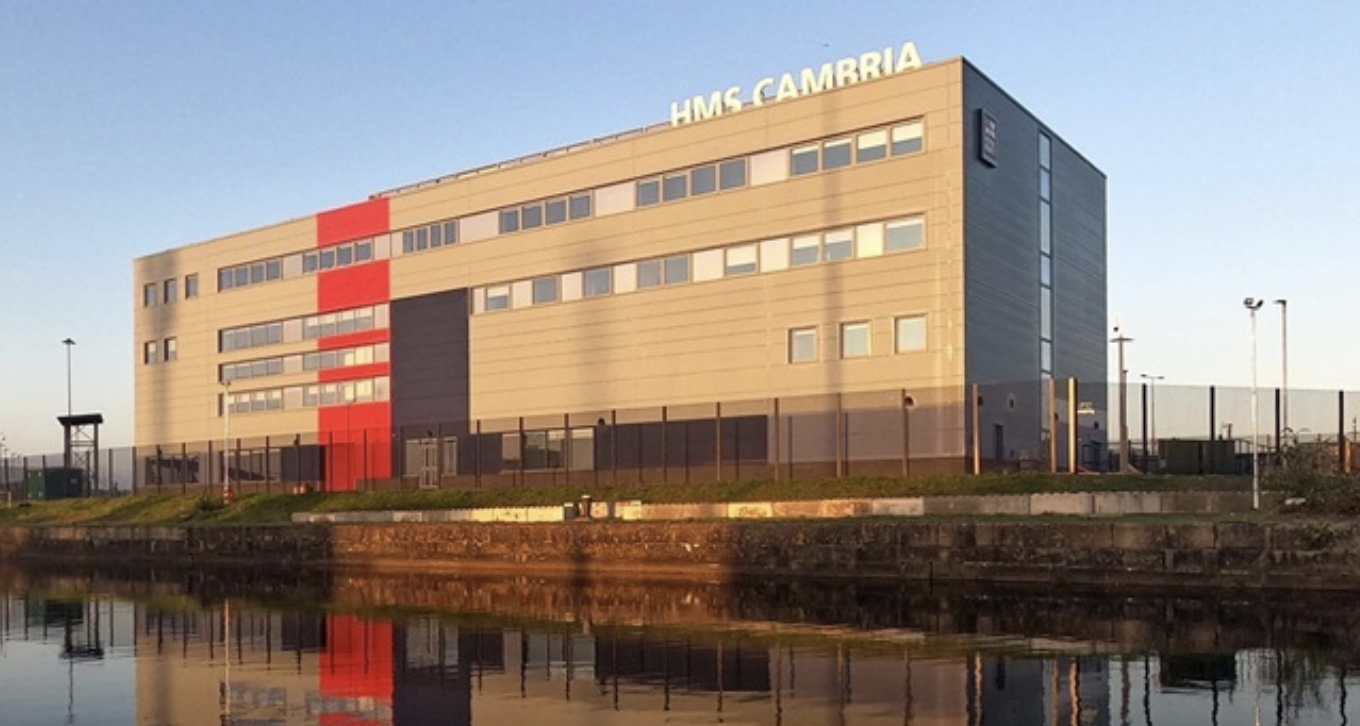

History

United Kingdom
- Name: HMS Cambria
- Commissioned: July 1947
- Status: Active
- Badge

General characteristics
- Class & type: Stone frigate

HMS Cambria is a shore establishment of the Royal Navy and the only Royal Naval Reserve unit in Wales. Based in Cardiff Bay, it serves as the primary hub for training and deploying Welsh reservists for service at sea and ashore.

== History ==
HMS Cambria was established as the Royal Naval Reserve unit for South Wales in July 1947 and originally occupied buildings in Cardiff Docks. Cambria remained in Cardiff until 1980, when the redevelopment of the docks there precipitated a move to the former service married couples' accommodation at Sully, Vale of Glamorgan, and was granted freedom of that county in 2012. Cambria returned to a purpose-built home in Cardiff Docks in July 2020.

Over the years Cambria, like many other RNR units, operated a number of seagoing ships; a motor minesweeper – the unit's first tender – was replaced in 1954 by the wooden-hulled minesweeper Brereton, which gave way in turn to Crichton (1961–76); all of these were rechristened HMS St David. In 1978 the unit acquired a converted trawler, which was again renamed St David. The ship's final vessel, acquired in 1984, was the new minesweeper Waveney, which was not renamed. Waveney remained with HMS Cambria until 1994, when a reorganisation of the RNR led to the abandonment of seagoing tenders.

Cambria is one of only three RNR units to have a satellite unit. The Tawe Division, based at Swansea, began its life as a Royal Naval Volunteer Reserve Wireless unit in 1932. Having originally begun life with just one recruit, the unit had expanded to 48 members by 1970. The unit was briefly commissioned as the stone frigate HMS Dragon from 1984 to 1994.

HMS Cambria was granted Freedom of the City of Swansea in 2018, and Freedom of the City of Cardiff in 2023.

== Current use ==
HMS Cambria also serves as the location for Candidate Preparation Course (CPC) West, which is a four-day course that prepares all Royal Navy rating candidates for Phase One training at HMS Raleigh. The course includes fitness testing, presentations on the Royal Navy, and basics of kit maintenance and drill.

== Units ==
- HMS Cambria, Royal Naval Reserve
- University Royal Naval Unit Wales (URNU)
- Cardiff Detachment, Royal Marines Reserve Bristol
- Satellite unit, the Tawe Division, at Swansea.
- T.S. Cardiff, Sea Cadet Corps
