= HMS Pyramus =

Several ships of the Royal Navy have been named HMS Pyramus, after the doomed lover from the writings of Ovid.

- HMS Pyramus (1810) was a fifth rate 36-gun frigate built in Portsmouth and hulked in 1832–33 at Halifax, Nova Scotia, sold and broken up in 1879.
- HMS Pyramus (1897) was a Pelorus-class protected cruiser launched in 1897, and sold in 1920.
