= HMS Forward (1984 shore establishment) =

Royal Naval Reserve unit in Birmingham, England

Coordinates: 52.4773°N 1.8660°W

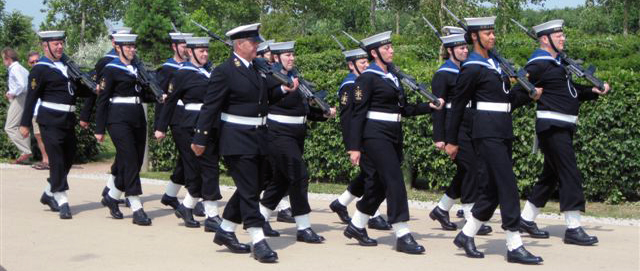
- The guard of HMS Forward parading at the National Memorial Arboretum, Alrewas, on Armed Forces Day 2010.

History

United Kingdom
- Name: HMS Forward
- Commissioned: 1 October 1984 as Birmingham Communications Training Centre
- Reclassified: 1984: at Broad Street; 1986: Moved to Sampson Road North; 1999: Moved to Tilton Road
- Status: Active
- Badge

General characteristics
- Class & type: Stone frigate

HMS Forward is a Royal Naval Reserve unit located in Birmingham, England, close to St. Andrews football stadium. It has a crew of nearly 100 naval and marine reservists, in addition to a handful of full-time staff. The Birmingham University Royal Naval Unit, the Defence Technical Undergraduate Scheme 'Taurus Squadron' and a detachment of the Royal Marines Reserve Merseyside are also located on the site. The ship is particularly unusual in that it is situated 80 miles from the sea.

== History ==
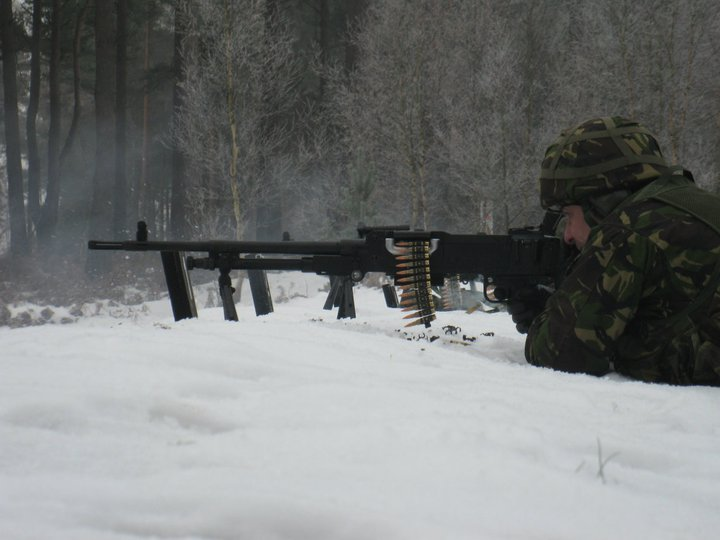
A Royal Naval Reservist from HMS Forward firing a GPMG

The base originated on a different site during the Second World War, and was originally known as the regional Naval Communications Training Centre. On 1 October 1984, the centre became a commissioned ship - a stone frigate - known as HMS Forward. In early 1985, the unit moved to a former industrial unit on Sampson Rd North which, on 28 January 1986, was officially opened by The Princess Royal. The unit once again moved in April 1999, this time to a new purpose-built building. Once again the official opening was performed by The Princess Royal. The ship acquired its name from the motto of the City of Birmingham - Forward. The unit is affiliated with HMS Daring, a Type 45 destroyer currently in service with the Royal Navy.

== Awards and noted events ==
In 2000, the ship won the Richards Trophy, a national seamanship competition, at HMS Raleigh (shore establishment).

In 2004, the ship was granted the Freedom of the City of Birmingham, from John Alden, Lord Mayor of Birmingham.

In 2007, a team from the ship rescued a man with hypothermia from Snowdon in driving hail.

The ship became more famous in recent years when it produced a winner of The Sun Military Awards, Able Seaman Grandison, who won the national award for 'Best Reservist'. Grandison is a taxi-driver in Sandwell, but left his work and contracts to deploy to the Indian Ocean as part of a team to provide armed protection against piracy to RFA Wave Knight. He was later promoted to Leading Hand.

One of the ship's company was part of a Royal Naval Reserve crew which was awarded a Crew Commendation by the Shipwrecked Mariners' Society in 2025. Yacht Wizard of ID foundered without power on the approaches to Portsmouth Harbour in challenging conditions and was rescued by three PAC 24 Rigid Hull Inflatable Boats (RHIBs) which responded to the radio call.

== Current tasks ==
Being the only large naval presence in the West Midlands, Forward is called upon to act in ceremonial duties and parades, and recently supplied contingents for the Birmingham Trafalgar Day, Remembrance Day, and Armed Forces Day parades.
