= Northwood Headquarters =

Military facility in England

- Eastbury, Hertfordshire, England
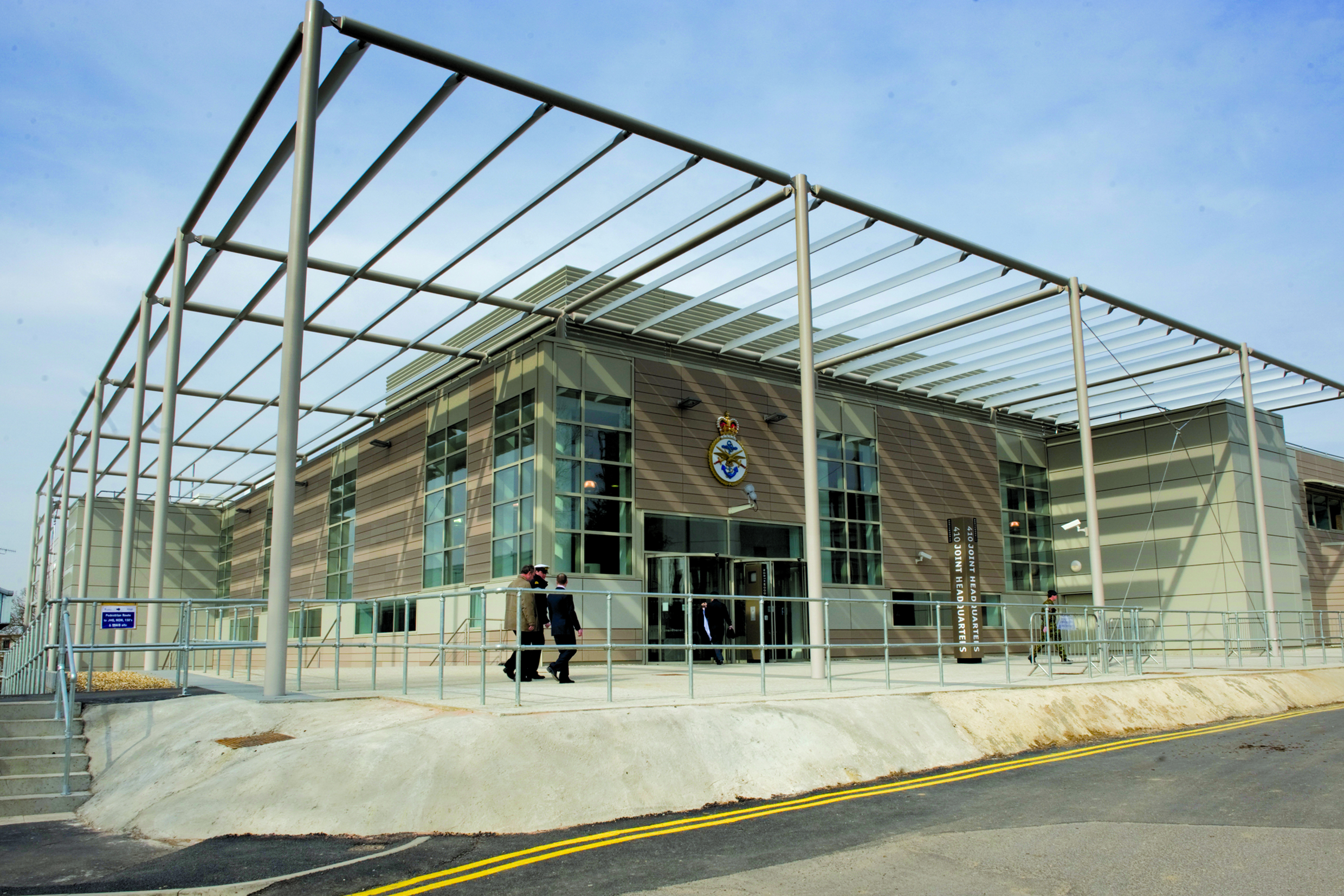
- The Permanent Joint Headquarters (PJHQ) building at Northwood Headquarters

Site information
- Type: Military headquarters
- Owner: Ministry of Defence
- Operator: Cyber & Specialist Operations Command
- Controlled by: Chief of Joint Operations
- Condition: Operational
- Website: Official website

Location
- Location in Hertfordshire
- Coordinates: 51°37′10″N 000°24′34″W
- Area: 18 hectares (44 acres)

Site history
- Built: 1938
- In use: 1938–1971 (Royal Air Force); 1971–2012 (Royal Navy); 2012–2019 (Joint Forces Command); 2019 – present (Strategic Command)

Northwood Headquarters is a military headquarters facility of the British Armed Forces in Eastbury, Hertfordshire, England, adjacent to the London suburb of Northwood. It is home to the following military command and control functions:

1. Headquarters, Cyber & Specialist Operations Command
2. Permanent Joint Headquarters
3. Commander Operations for the Royal Navy
4. HMS Wildfire for the Maritime Reserves
5. NATO Allied Maritime Command

== History ==
The headquarters is on the grounds of Eastbury Park. In 1938 the Royal Air Force took over the site for the use of RAF Coastal Command which made use of the Eastbury house and also created a network of underground bunkers and operations blocks. The house was used as an Officers' Mess though it was subsequently damaged by fire.

In 1953 the Commander-in-Chief, Home Fleet, gained an additional NATO responsibility as Commander-in-Chief, Eastern Atlantic, as part of SACLANT, and the Eastern Atlantic NATO military command structure was established at the Northwood Headquarters. The Commander-in-Chief Home Fleet still flew his flag however in HMS Tyne at Portsmouth. In 1960 the Commander-in-Chief Home Fleet moved to Northwood, in 1963 the Naval unit at Northwood was commissioned as HMS Warrior and in 1966 the NATO Channel Command (a post also held by the Commander-in-Chief Home Fleet) moved to Northwood from Portsmouth.

In September 1971, when the post of Commander-in-Chief Fleet was established, the Royal Navy took over responsibility for the whole site and in 1978 the Flag Officer Submarines also moved his Headquarters to Northwood.

As Headquarters of the Commander-in-Chief Fleet, the site was the controlling Headquarters for Operation Corporate, the Falklands War, in 1982.

The Permanent Joint Headquarters was established on site in April 1996.

In 2002, following a rationalisation, the Commander-in-Chief Fleet moved the majority of his staff to Portsmouth and handed over the Northwood site to the Chief of Joint Operations.

In 2006 major construction works commenced to improve the functionality of the site: the works, which involved the refurbishment or replacement of many of the key buildings, were carried under a Private Finance Initiative contract by Carillion. Queen Elizabeth II visited the site on 6 May 2010 to open the main Permanent Joint Headquarters building, part of a £150 million redevelopment of the site.

HMS Wildfire returned to the Northwood site and a new building on the site in June 2011.

Joint Forces Command was established on site in April 2012. On 9 December 2019, it was announced that Joint Forces Command had been renamed as Strategic Command.

The Operational Headquarters for the EU Naval Force moved from Northwood to Rota, Spain and to Brest, France on 29 March 2019.

== Occupants ==
=== Cyber & Specialist Operations Command ===
Cyber & Specialist Operations Command is a tri-service organisation managing allocated joint capabilities from the three armed services.

=== Permanent Joint Headquarters ===
Permanent Joint Headquarters (PJHQ) is a tri-service organisation holding Operational Control of British armed forces joint military operation. PJHQ is headed by the Chief of Joint Operations. Single-service operations remain under the operational control of the appropriate front-line command.

=== Royal Navy ===
The Commander Operations commands the operations staff on the Northwood site. Among Commander Operations' responsibilities are command of Commander Task Force (CTF) 311 (UK attack submarines) and CTF 345 (UK nuclear missile submarines).

Maritime Reservists from HMS Wildfire, part of the Royal Naval Reserve, who had moved from the Northwood Headquarters site to Brackenhill House on Oxhey Drive South in 1988, moved back into a new building on the Northwood Headquarters site in June 2011.

=== NATO Allied Maritime Command ===
The NATO Allied Maritime Command is based at Northwood, and comes under the Command and Control of the Allied Command Operations.

=== Support units ===
The Headquarters Staffs are supported by:

- Joint Support Unit Northwood, providing administrative support, life support, facilities and supplier management.
- A detachment of Military Provost Guard Service personnel providing force protection.
