= Stone frigate =

Naval establishment on land

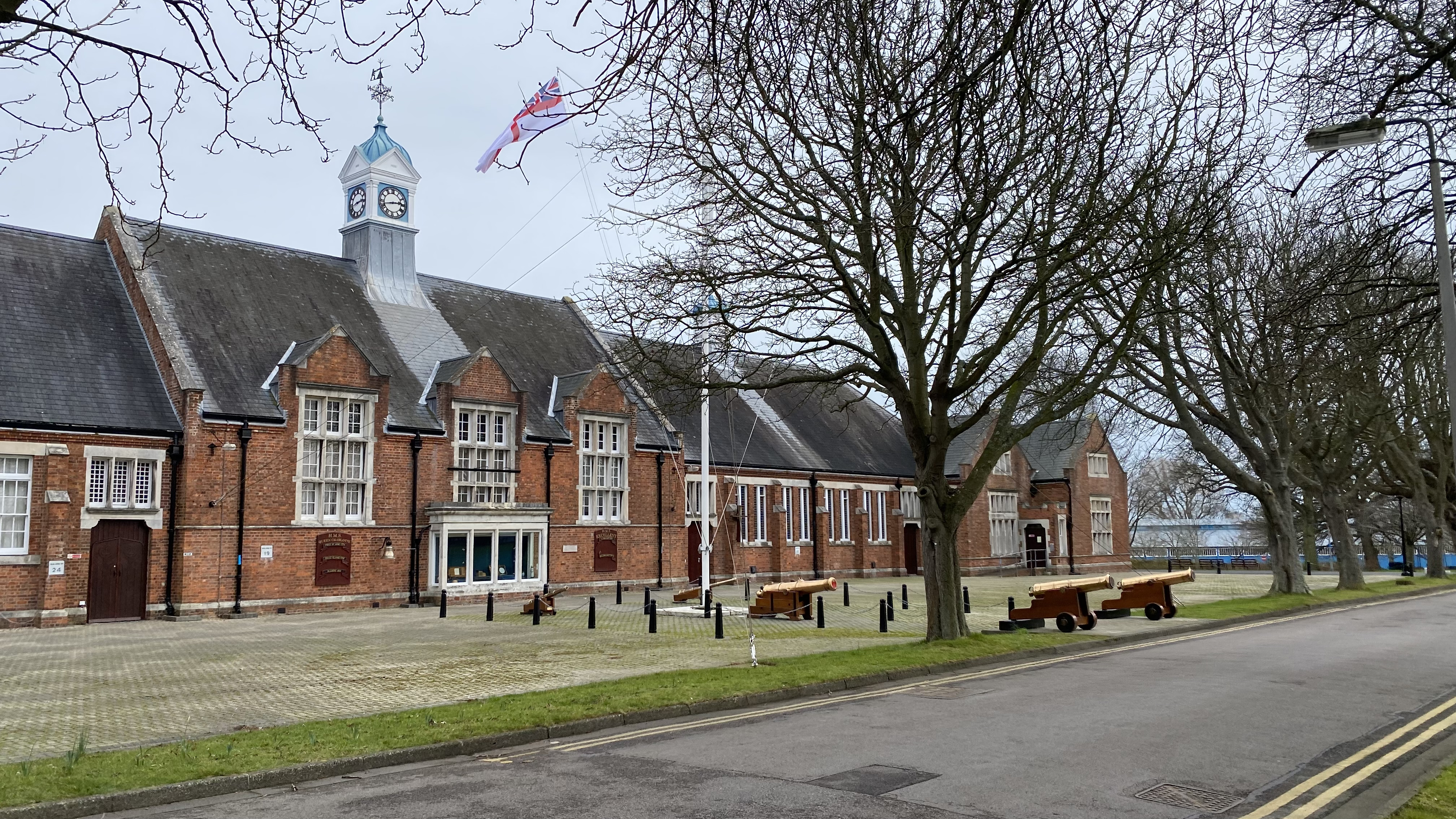
HMS Excellent, Portsmouth

A stone frigate (or concrete frigate) is a naval establishment on land. The term has its origins in Britain's Royal Navy.

Historically, the Royal Navy preferred to house and train its sailors on hulks, old wooden ships of the line that were permanently moored offshore. Shore accommodation was regarded as expensive to build and liable to breed indiscipline. The use of hulks became increasingly impractical, however, and they began to be replaced by shore establishments from the late 19th century onwards. An early "stone frigate" was the gunnery school HMS Excellent, established in 1891 to replace a hulk of the same name. By World War I there were about 25 "stone frigates" in the United Kingdom.

The use of stone frigates continues in the Royal Navy and some other navies of the Commonwealth of Nations, including the Royal Canadian Navy, the Indian Navy, the Royal Australian Navy, and the Royal New Zealand Navy.

== See also ==
- List of Royal Navy shore establishments
- Unsinkable aircraft carrier
