= Time from NPL (MSF) =

Time signal transmitted from Anthorn Radio Station in Cumbria, England

MSF
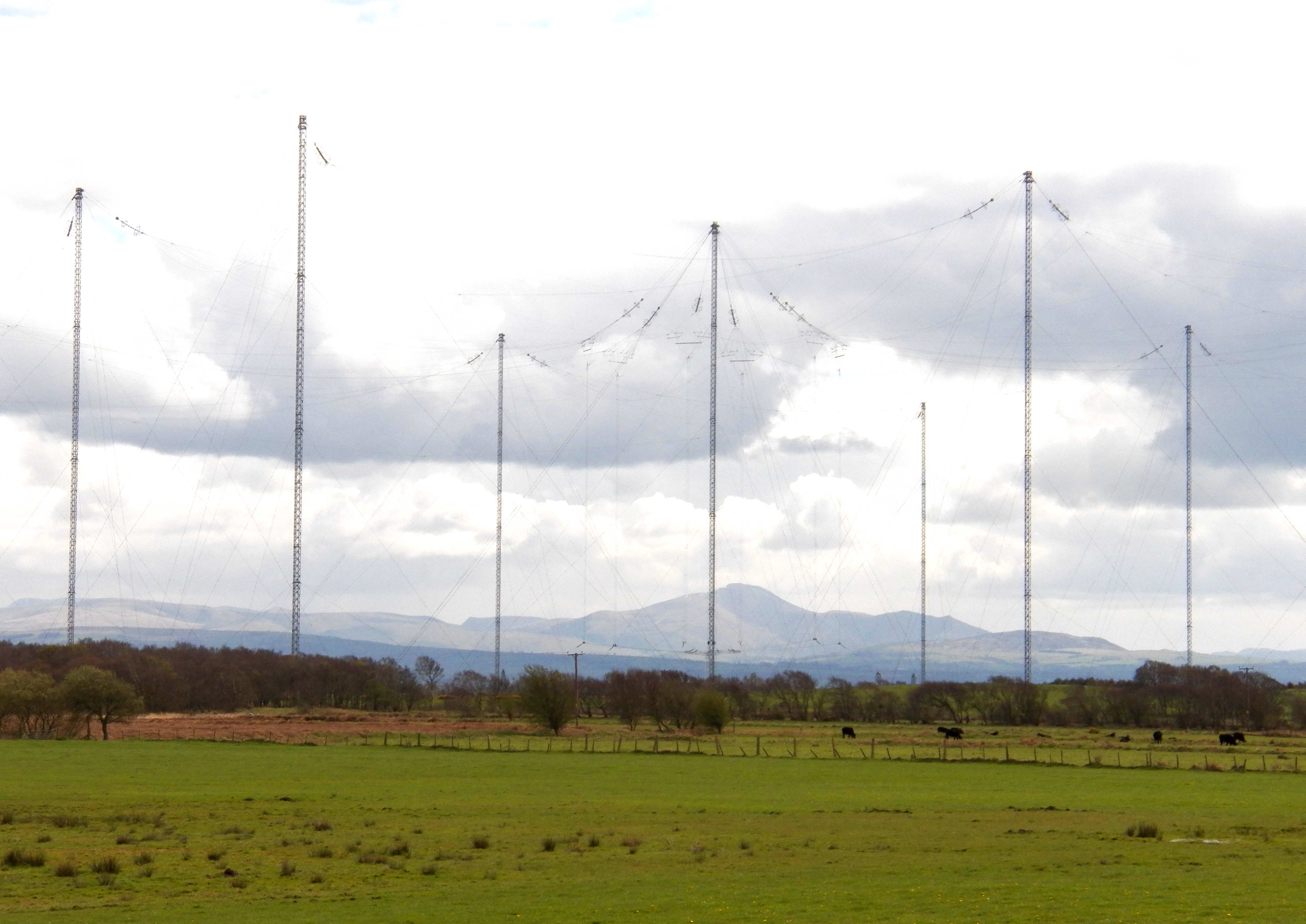
- The trideco antenna of the VLF transmitter at Anthorn Radio Station
- Location: Anthorn Radio Station, Anthorn, United Kingdom
- Coordinates: 54.91°N 3.28°W
- Operator: Babcock International
- Frequency: 60 kHz
- Power: 17 kW
- Began operation: 1950; mostly 24-hour service since 1966
- Website: Time and frequency MSF radio signal - NPL

Map showing the location of the Anthorn VLF transmitter in Cumbria.

The Time from NPL is a radio signal broadcast from the Anthorn Radio Station near Anthorn, Cumbria, which serves as the United Kingdom's national time reference. The time signal is derived from three atomic clocks installed at the transmitter site, and is based on time standards maintained by the UK's National Physical Laboratory (NPL) in Teddington. The service is provided by Babcock International (which acquired former providers VT Communications), under contract to the NPL. It was funded by the former Department for Business, Innovation and Skills; as of 2017 NPL Management Limited (NPLML) was owned by the Department for Business, Energy and Industrial Strategy (BEIS), and NPL operated as a public corporation.

The signal, also known as the MSF signal (and formerly the Rugby clock), is broadcast at a highly accurate frequency of 60 kHz and can be received throughout the UK, and in much of northern and western Europe. The signal's carrier frequency is maintained at 60 kHz to within 2 parts in 10^{12}, controlled by caesium atomic clocks at the radio station.

== History ==
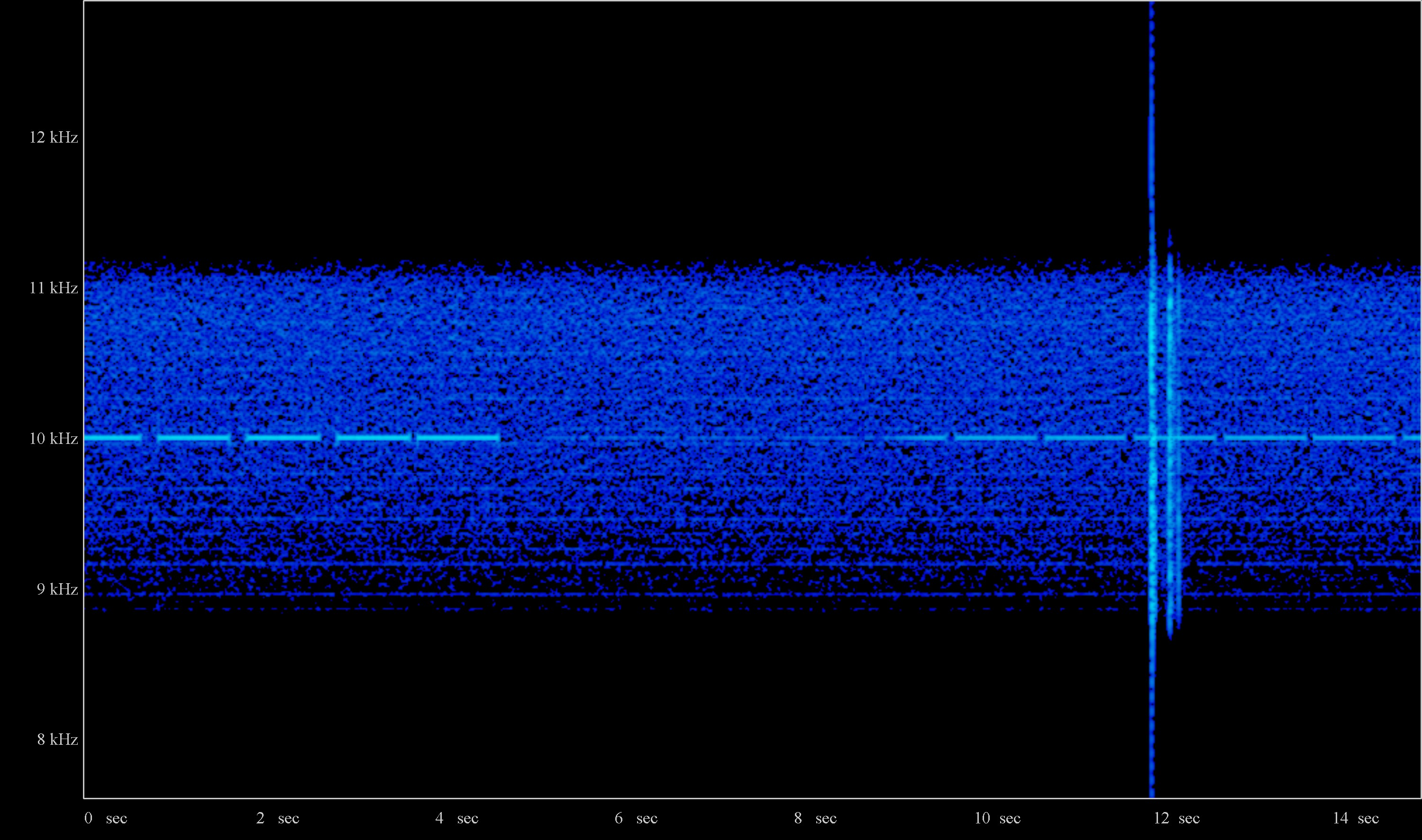
Received, at Lesvos Island, during the transfer from Rugby to Anthorn

A radio station at Rugby was first operated by the Post Office from 1926, with the call-sign GBR. From 19 December 1927, it broadcast a 15.8 kHz time signal from the Royal Observatory which could be received worldwide. It consisted of 306 pulses in the five minutes up to and including 10:00 and 18:00 GMT, with a longer pulse at the start of each minute. Frequency-shift keying was added in 1967, making the signal harder to use as a frequency reference. The time signals, preceded by the callsign "GBR GBR TIME" in Morse code, were transmitted during the 5 minutes preceding 03:00, 09:00, 15:00 and 21:00. Transmitter GBZ on 19.6 kHz was used as a reserve, when GBR was off-air for maintenance. Eventually, time signals from GBR were terminated in November 1986 and it is no longer used as a frequency reference.

The MSF signals started in 1950, following the transmission pattern described below. They were originally intended to provide frequency references at 2.5, 5 and 10 MHz, originally only occasionally during the day. At first, there were announcements every fifteen minutes, beginning with the Morse code representation of "MSF MSF MSF" (MSF is "-- ··· ··-·" in Morse code), followed by speech "This is MSF, Rugby, England, transmitting ...". From May 1953, the signal was broadcast 24 hours a day, but with regular five-minute stoppages to allow the reception of other signals. The 60 kHz signal finally became an uninterrupted 24-hour service in 1966, and the frequency references were discontinued in February 1988.

On 27 February 2007 the NPL started tests of the new time signal transmissions from Anthorn. The Anthorn station was operated by VT Communications from its opening in 2007 until 2010, when it was acquired by Babcock International.

The formal inauguration of the relocated facility took place on 1 April 2007, when the name of the service became "The Time from NPL" and the signal from Rugby was permanently switched off. The change in location and consequent change in signal strength can make some equipment designed to use the MSF signal fail to continue doing so. This is found more in domestic equipment not designed for optimum sensitivity and positioned haphazardly. Currently, the signal from Anthorn is still usable as far as the Mediterranean, although it is weaker than Rugby.

== The 'MSF signal' and the 'Rugby clock' ==
From the time signal's inauguration in 1950 until 1 April 2007 it was transmitted from Rugby Radio Station near Rugby, Warwickshire. The transmitter's original location meant that the clock was referred to as "the Rugby clock". Following its relocation in 2007 to Cumbria, the NPL now formally calls the signal "The Time from NPL".

The Rugby transmitter's callsign was MSF, where 'M' is one of the ITU prefixes allocated to the United Kingdom, and the letters 'SF' were allocated for no documented reason. This resulted in the common terminology "the MSF signal", which is still used by the NPL. The official history of the service says that "Rugby was given an additional commitment for the transmission of reference Modulated Standard Frequencies", but no actual explanation is given for the call sign "MSF". According to the NPL it seems the call sign was chosen so that it could be memorized as "Master Standard Frequency" but MSF was not intended to be an abbreviation.

== Transmission and reception ==
The transmitted signal has an effective radiated power of 17 kW, on a frequency of 60 kHz to within 2 parts in 10^{12}. The signal strength is greater than 10 mV/m at 100 km (62 mi); it is greater than 100 μV/m at 1,000 km (620 mi) from the transmitter, and thus can be received at not less than this strength throughout the UK. The signal can also be received, and is widely used, in northern and western Europe.

While at Rugby, the transmitter generated 60 kW of radio frequency power (using 70 kW of mains power). The 180 metre-high (590') T-aerial antenna was 500 metres (1,600 ft) across at its top. The vertical part of the antenna radiated the signal, so that the received strength was similar in all directions (it was approximately omnidirectional).

== Uses ==
In addition to professional uses where accurate time is required, radio-controlled clocks (including wristwatches) with both digital and analog displays using the NPL signal are widely used. (Similar clocks are available in other regions with standard time transmissions. In fact most radio controlled devices in Europe use the Mainflingen DCF77 signal with its 2000-6000 Km range) As far as users are concerned they are simply clocks with the same features and settings as others, but always display the right time, and correct themselves for summer time.

== Protocol ==
=== Fast code ===
When MSF was introduced, in 1950, it transmitted only second markers and minute markers, with no coded data. In 1974, a short burst of binary code at 100 bit/s was inserted into the minute marker to specify the time. In 1977, a slow code was introduced, which encoded the time at 1 bit/s over the whole minute (as detailed below). In 1998, the fast code was removed (reverting to a simple minute marker), keeping the slow code.

=== Slow code ===
The signal is encoded as follows:

The MSF transmitter is switched off for brief intervals (on-off keying) near the beginning of each second to encode the current time and date. The rise and fall times of the 60 kHz carrier are determined by the combination of antenna and transmitter.

Each UTC second begins with 100 ms of 'off', preceded by at least 500 ms of carrier. The second marker is transmitted with an accuracy better than ±1 ms relative to Coordinated Universal Time (UTC), which is itself always within ±0.9 seconds of Universal Time (UT1) (until 20 May 2027) which is the mean solar time which would actually be observed at 0° longitude.

The first second of the minute, denoted second 00, begins with a period of 500 ms with the carrier off, to serve as a minute marker.

The other 59 (or, exceptionally, 60 or 58) seconds of the minute always begin with at least 100 ms 'off', followed by two data bits of 100 ms each, and end with at least 700 ms of carrier.

- Bit A is transmitted from 100 to 200 ms after the second
- Bit B is transmitted from 200 to 300 ms after the second

Negative Polarity Bit Signalling

- Carrier ON represents a bit value of 0.
- Carrier OFF represents a bit value of 1.

If each second is considered as ten 100 ms pieces, the minute marker is transmitted as 1111100000, while all other seconds are transmitted as 1AB0000000.

Although two data bits are transmitted per second, the time code (as currently transmitted) has the property that only one of them is variable; non-zero B bits are only transmitted when the corresponding A bit has a fixed value. However, the official NPL documentation states that these “fixed value bits” 01A-16A, 17B-51B, and 52B and 59B are currently set at '0', but that they may be used in the future.

Seconds 01–16 carry information for the current minute about the difference (DUT1) between atomic and astronomical time, and the remaining seconds convey the time and date code.

The time and date code information begins 43 seconds before the corresponding minute marker (second 17 of the previous minute, in the absence of leap seconds), and is always given in terms of UK civil time, which is UTC in winter and UTC+1h when Summer Time is in effect.

MSF time code Shaded bits are fixed
Bit	A	B	Meaning	Bit	A	B	Meaning	Bit	A	B	Meaning	
00	1	1	Minute mark	20	10	0	Year (00–99)	40	10	0	Hour (00–23)	
01	0	+0.1	DUT1 (0.1–0.8); Unary encoding, bit set if DUT1 ≥ Weight	21	8	0	Year (00–99)	41	8	0	Hour (00–23)	
02	0	+0.2	DUT1 (0.1–0.8); Unary encoding, bit set if DUT1 ≥ Weight	22	4	0	Year (00–99)	42	4	0	Hour (00–23)	
03	0	+0.3	DUT1 (0.1–0.8); Unary encoding, bit set if DUT1 ≥ Weight	23	2	0	Year (00–99)	43	2	0	Hour (00–23)	
04	0	+0.4	DUT1 (0.1–0.8); Unary encoding, bit set if DUT1 ≥ Weight	24	1	0	Year (00–99)	44	1	0	Hour (00–23)	
05	0	+0.5	DUT1 (0.1–0.8); Unary encoding, bit set if DUT1 ≥ Weight	25	10	0	Month (01–12)	45	40	0	Minute (00–59)	
06	0	+0.6	DUT1 (0.1–0.8); Unary encoding, bit set if DUT1 ≥ Weight	26	8	0	Month (01–12)	46	20	0	Minute (00–59)	
07	0	+0.7	DUT1 (0.1–0.8); Unary encoding, bit set if DUT1 ≥ Weight	27	4	0	Month (01–12)	47	10	0	Minute (00–59)	
08	0	+0.8	DUT1 (0.1–0.8); Unary encoding, bit set if DUT1 ≥ Weight	28	2	0	Month (01–12)	48	8	0	Minute (00–59)	
09	0	−0.1	DUT1 (−0.1–−0.8); Unary encoding, bit set if DUT1 ≤ Weight	29	1	0	Month (01–12)	49	4	0	Minute (00–59)	
10	0	−0.2	DUT1 (−0.1–−0.8); Unary encoding, bit set if DUT1 ≤ Weight	30	20	0	Day of month (01–31)	50	2	0	Minute (00–59)	
11	0	−0.3	DUT1 (−0.1–−0.8); Unary encoding, bit set if DUT1 ≤ Weight	31	10	0	Day of month (01–31)	51	1	0	Minute (00–59)	
12	0	−0.4	DUT1 (−0.1–−0.8); Unary encoding, bit set if DUT1 ≤ Weight	32	8	0	Day of month (01–31)	52	0	0	Minute marker 01111110	
13	0	−0.5	DUT1 (−0.1–−0.8); Unary encoding, bit set if DUT1 ≤ Weight	33	4	0	Day of month (01–31)	53	1	STW	Summer time warning.	
14	0	−0.6	DUT1 (−0.1–−0.8); Unary encoding, bit set if DUT1 ≤ Weight	34	2	0	Day of month (01–31)	54	1	P1	Year (17A–24A)	Odd parity over
15	0	−0.7	DUT1 (−0.1–−0.8); Unary encoding, bit set if DUT1 ≤ Weight	35	1	0	Day of month (01–31)	55	1	P2	Day (25A–35A)	Odd parity over
16	0	−0.8	DUT1 (−0.1–−0.8); Unary encoding, bit set if DUT1 ≤ Weight	36	4	0	Day of week Sunday=0; Saturday=6	56	1	P3	DOW (36A–38A)	Odd parity over
17	80	0	Year (00–99)	37	2	0	Day of week Sunday=0; Saturday=6	57	1	P4	Time (39A–51A)	Odd parity over
18	40	0	Year (00–99)	38	1	0	Day of week Sunday=0; Saturday=6	58	1	ST	Summer time in effect.	
19	20	0	Year (00–99)	39	20	0	Hour (00–23)	59	0	0	Unused, always 0.	

Consecutive bits from 01B–08B are set to 1 to indicate positive DUT1 values from +0.1s to +0.8s. For example, a DUT1 of +0.5 s is indicated by bits 01B–05B being set to 1 (e.g., 11111000 where bit 01B is the leftmost). Consecutive bits from 09B–16B are set to 1 to indicate negative DUT1 values from −0.1s to −0.8s. For example, bit 11B is set if DUT1 ≤ −0.3 s.

In case of a leap second, a zero bit is inserted between seconds 16 and 17. In case of a negative leap second, second 16 will be deleted. Since negative leap seconds can only occur when DUT1 is positive, bits 9B through 16B will be zero.

Bits 17A–51A encode the time of the following minute in binary-coded decimal, most significant bit first. Beginning with bit 17A comes 4 bits of tens of years, 4 bits of years, 1 bit of tens of months, 4 bits of months, 2 bits of tens of days, 4 bits of days, 3 bits of day of week (0=Sunday), 2 bits of tens of hours, 4 bits of hours, 3 bits of tens of minutes, and 4 bits of minutes.

Bits 52A–59A provide another way to identify minute boundaries. This sequence 01111110 never appears elsewhere in the A bits; due to BCD encoding, at most five consecutive 1 bits can appear elsewhere in the A bits (bits 27A–31A, on July 30 or 31, or bits 33A–37A, if a day ending in 7 falls on a Saturday). These six consecutive 1 bits thus uniquely identify the end of the minute.

Bits 54B–57B provide odd parity over the time code. The 4 parity bits cover years (8 bits), months and days (11 bits), day of week (3 bits), and time of day (13 bits) respectively.

Bit 58B indicates the broadcast time is summer time. Bit 53B gives warning that the summer time bit is about to change. When bit 53B is in use, it is set for 61 consecutive minutes, starting 1 hour 7 seconds before the time change, and ending 7 seconds before the time change; this is also 5 seconds before the change of bit 58B, which is itself transmitted 2 seconds (1.7–1.8 seconds, to be more precise) before the moment of the time change.

=== Shortcomings of the signal format ===
MSF does not broadcast any advance warning of leap seconds, which occur less than once a year on average. Its only indication that a leap second will be added is a change in the number of padding bits before the time code during the minute before the leap second. Therefore, unless a leap-second announcement is manually entered into a receiver in advance, an autonomous MSF receiver may take some time to regain synchronization with UTC after a leap second (especially if the reception is not robust at the time of the leap second).

Like DCF77, MSF provides 1 hour warning of summer-time changes but no warnings in the days that precede those changes.

== Outages ==
MSF normally broadcasts continuously, but is occasionally taken out of service for scheduled or unscheduled maintenance. The Time from NPL Web site reports upcoming scheduled maintenance outages, and information on unscheduled outages.

== See also ==
- Greenwich Time Signal
- Coordinated Universal Time
- DCF77, similar time service in Germany
- WWVB, similar time service in the United States
