= Defence High Frequency Communications Service =

British military communication system

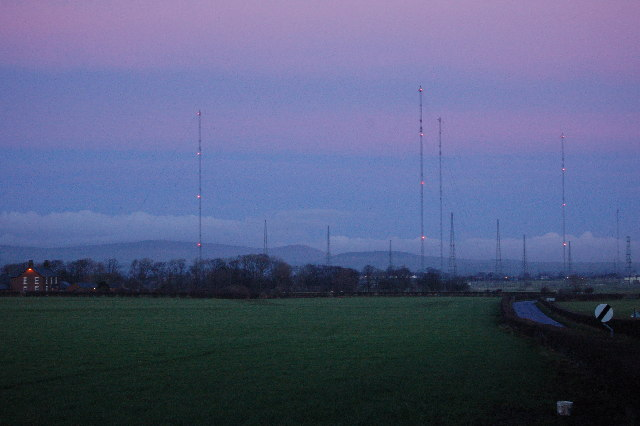
- Transmitting masts at DHFCS Inskip, Lancashire.
- Type: Military audio, data and voice communications
- Location: Global
- Use: Royal Air Force; Royal Navy; British Army; British Government; NATO; Civilian Organisations
- Owner: Ministry of Defence
- Operator: Babcock International Group
- Established: 9 July 2003
- Current status: Operational

The Defence High Frequency Communications Service or the DHFCS is a British military beyond line-of-sight communication system operated by the Ministry of Defence (MOD) and used predominately by the UK Armed Forces, as well as other authorised users. The system operates from six transmitting and receiving sites across the United Kingdom and is controlled from a network control centre located at Forest Moor in North Yorkshire and a backup site at Kinloss Barracks in Moray. Overseas sites are located in Ascension Island, Cyprus and Falkland Islands. In 2003 VT Merlin Communications (now Babcock International Group) were awarded the contract to operate the system for a period of fifteen years on behalf of the Ministry of Defence. The system is to be replaced by the Defence Strategic Radio Service (DSRS) also operated by Babcock

== History ==
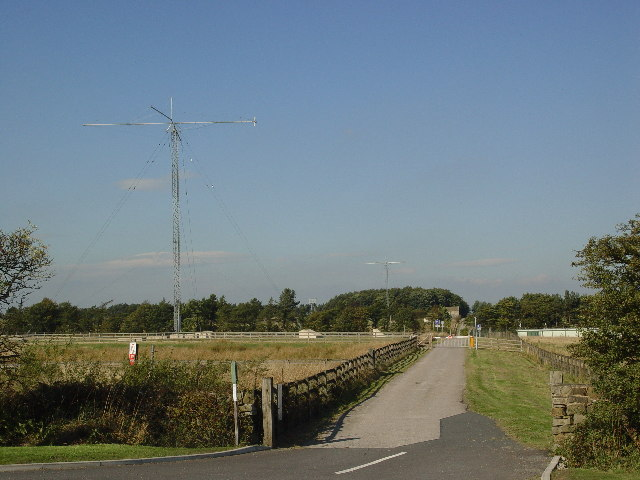
Masts at DHFCS Forest Moor, North Yorkshire.

=== Legacy systems ===
Prior to the creation of the DHFCS, the Royal Air Force (RAF) and Royal Navy (RN) operated their own independent high frequency (HF) communications systems. The RAF's Strike Command Integrated Communications System (STCICS), later known as Terrestrial Air Sea Communications (TASCOMM), operated from six sites within the UK whilst the RN system had twelve sites. The systems overlapped in their capabilities whilst simultaneously having gaps in overall capability, high running costs, lack of flexibility and neither were used to their full capacity.

=== Public private partnership ===
In 2003 the Ministry of Defence (MOD) decided to merge the existing high frequency communications systems into one enhanced system and thereafter operate and manage it as the Defence High Frequency Communications Service (DHFCS). The Defence Communication Services Agency (DCSA) (now Information Systems and Services (ISS) under Joint Forces Command) awarded a £228m public private partnership contract to VT Merlin Communications (now Babcock International Group) to upgrade and operate the system. The contract lasts for fifteen years (ending in 2018) and is funded by a reduction in the number of transmitting, receiving and control sites and a reduction of 266 military personnel.

=== Site rationalisation ===
Through the rationalisation of sites, twelve sites (four RAF, seven RN and a joint site in Gibraltar) were closed between 2003 and 2006. Many sites were used for other military purposes with the sites at Bampton Castle, Chelveston and Milltown being the only sites which closed entirely.

== Closed legacy system sites ==
UK Military High Frequency Transmitter, Receiver and Control Centre Sites Closed as Part of DHFCS Rationalisation
Site Name	Location	Operator	Type	Notes
DCSA Bampton Castle	Former RAF Bampton Castle, Bampton, Oxfordshire, England	Royal Air Force	Network Control Station; Receiver	Formerly operated by RAF No. 2 Signals Unit and No. 81 Signals Unit. Approximately seventy-two masts were removed in December 2003 and the final two removed in 2015.
DCSA Chelveston	Former RAF Chelveston, Chelveston, Northamptonshire, England	Royal Air Force	Transmitter	Established 1977, closed in December 2003 and sold by the MoD in June 2005. Operated by RAF No. 81 Signals Unit.
DCSA Clach McKenny	Rosneath Peninsula, Argyll and Bute, Scotland	Royal Navy	Receiver	Provided local HF services to naval units in the Firth of Clyde.
RNAS Culdrose	RNAS Culdrose, Helston, Cornwall, England	Royal Navy	Transmitter; Receiver	
DCSA Fort Staddon	Plymouth, Devon, England	Royal Navy	Transmitter	Provided local HF services to Flag Officer Sea Training (FOST).
DCSA Gibraltar	Gibraltar (British Overseas Territory)	Joint Tri-Service	Network Control Station; Transmitter; Receiver	
DCSA Milltown	Former RAF Milltown, Elgin, Morayshire, Scotland	Royal Air Force	Transmitter	
DCSA Plymouth	Plymouth, Devon, England	Royal Navy	Receiver	Provided local HF services to Flag Officer Sea Training (FOST).
DCSA St. Mawgan	RAF St. Mawgan, Newquay, Cornwall, England	Royal Air Force	Network Control Station	
DCSA St. Vincent	Admiralty Citadel, Whitehall, London, England. (Former HMS St. Vincent)	Royal Navy	Network Control Station	
DCSA Toward Taynuilt	Cowal Peninsula, Agryll and Bute, Scotland	Royal Navy	Transmitter	Provided local HF services to naval units in the Firth of Clyde.
RNAS Yeovilton	RNAS Yeovilton, Yeovil, Somerset, England	Royal Navy	Transmitter; Receiver	

== Purpose ==
Defence High Frequency Communications Service (DHFCS) sites within the United Kingdom. Red location markers represent HF receiving sites, blue markers are HF transmitting sites and green markers LF sites.

The service provides HF communications for the Ministry of Defence (Royal Air Force, Royal Navy, British Army and Joint Forces Command), other British government departments and NATO (including its Partnership for Peace organisation). A memorandum of understanding exists to allow cooperation between the DHFCS and the US Air Force's (USAF) High Frequency Global Communications System (HFGCS) through a link to the HFGCS at the USAF facility at RAF Croughton in Northamptonshire. A link with the Australian Defence Force's High Frequency Communications System (HFCS) based in Canberra also exists.

The service allows real-time strategic communications between users which comprise ground stations, submarines, surface vessels, fixed wing aircraft and helicopters.

== Structure and operation ==
The DHFCS was declared operational in March 2008. Within the UK, the system is divided into three stations of paired transmitter and receiver sites. 'UK North' comprises sites at Kinloss Barracks and Crimond in north east Scotland, 'UK Middle' at Forest Moor and Inskip in northern England and 'UK South' at St. Eval and Penhale Sands in south west England. Three overseas stations, with two sites each, are located in Cyprus, Ascension Island and the Falkland Islands.

The system was originally operated from a network control station (NCS) located at Forest Moor, with an alternate network control station (ANCS) at Kinloss which could be used in the event that Forest Moor station was unavailable. Split site working was introduced in 2011 which allows both the Forest Moor NCS and Kinloss ANCS to control 50% of the network, increasing resilience and recovery time in the event of a loss of service and minimising potential network unavailability.

Sites at Anthorn (Formerly HMS Nuthatch) and Skelton in northern England provide a Very Low Frequency (VLF) transmitting capability which is used to send communications to submerged submarines. Due to the low frequencies involved submarines can only receive VLF communications and do not carry VLF transmission aerials. Therefore, there is no requirement for land-based receiver sites as communications are one way.

The DHFCS is known to have the following capabilities.

- Nuclear Firing Chain (HF/LF Secure Data)
- Ship to shore Automatic Link Establishment (ALE), Non ALE (Secure Data) – STANAG 5066 ARQ & DRC
- Direct Access users Channels (Voice)
- Multi Channel Broadcasts (Secure Data)
- Single Channel Broadcasts (Data & Voice)
- NATO Broadcasts (Secure Data)
- Off the Air Monitoring (Secure Data)
- Legacy Ship to Shore Services (Secure Data)
- Rear Links Services (Secure Data)
- Maritime Air Telecommunication Organisation (Secure Data & Voice)
- Terrestrial Air Sea Communications (TASCOMM - Voice)
- Voice Automatic Link Establishment

== DHFCS sites in the United Kingdom ==
UK DHFCS Transmitter, Receiver and Control Centre Sites
Site Name	Location	Lat/Long	Type	Station	Callsign	Notes
DHFCS Crimond	Former RNAS Rattray, Aberdeenshire, Scotland	57°36'47.78"N, 1°52'52.21"W	Transmitter	UK North		Formerly operated by the Royal Navy.
DHFCS Forest Moor	Adjacent to former HMS Forest Moor, Harrogate, North Yorkshire, England	54° 0'22.86"N, 1°43'30.38"W	Network Control Station; Receiver	UK Middle	TASCOMM (Terrestrial Air Sea Communications)	Formerly operated by the Royal Navy.
DHFCS Inskip	Former RNAS Inskip, Lancashire, England	53°49'36.00"N, 2°50'2.30"W	Transmitter	UK Middle		Formerly operated by the Royal Navy.
DHFCS Kinloss	Kinloss Barracks, Moray, Scotland	57°38'22.12"N, 3°33'21.22"W	Network Control Station; Receiver	UK North	TASCOMM	Formerly operated by the Royal Air Force.
DHFCS Penhale Sands	Cornwall, England		Receiver	UK South		Formerly operated by the Royal Air Force.
DHFCS St. Eval	Cornwall, England		Transmitter	UK South		Formerly operated by the Royal Air Force.

== Overseas DHFCS sites ==
Overseas DHFCS Transmitter and Receiver Sites
Site Name	Location	Type	Station	Callsign	Notes
DHCFS Airhead	RAF Ascension, Ascension Island, Mid Atlantic Ocean			TASCOMM	
DHFCS Bush Rincon	East Falkland, Falkland Islands, South Atlantic Ocean		Falkland Islands	TASCOMM	
DHFCS Donkey Plain	Donkey Plain, Ascension Island, Mid Atlantic Ocean		Ascension Island	TASCOMM	
DHFCS Episkopi	Episkopi, Western Sovereign Base Area, Cyprus		Cyprus	CYPRUS	
DHFCS Mocho Pond	East Falkland, Falkland Islands, South Atlantic		Falkland Islands	TASCOMM	
DHFCS Salt Lake	Western Sovereign Base Area, Cyprus		Cyprus	CYPRUS	
