= Doosan Babcock =

Original equipment manufacturer

Doosan Babcock Limited
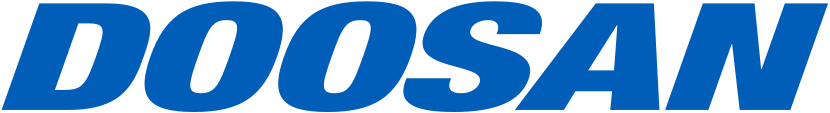
- Formerly: Babcock & Wilcox Ltd
- Industry: Energy services
- Founded: 1891
- Successors: Altrad Babcock Ltd.
- Headquarters: Crawley, England; Renfrew, Scotland
- Key people: CEO Andy Colquhoun
- Number of employees: 5,414 (2008)
- Parent: Independent (1891–1987); FKI Babcock PLC (1987–89); Babcock Intl. Group (1989–95); Mitsui (1995–2006); Doosan Group (2006–22); Altrad (2022–present)
- Website: https://altradbabcock.com/

Altrad Babcock Ltd (formerly Doosan Babcock Ltd.) is a power sector original equipment manufacturer (OEM), construction, upgrade, and after-market services company that offers specialist services and technologies to the fossil-fired power generation, nuclear power generation, and oil, gas, and petrochemical industries. AB's main headquarters are in Crawley, England. European headquarters are in Renfrew, Scotland. The company has manufacturing facilities in the UK, Germany, India, Vietnam and South Korea, and 17 offices around the world.

The company began as Babcock & Wilcox Ltd founded in 1891 by the American Babcock & Wilcox company. The boiler manufacturing and energy services division of Babcock International were later sold off to Mitsui Engineering & Shipbuilding of Japan. After acquiring it from Mitsui in 2006, Doosan Heavy Industries & Construction sold the company to Altrad in 2022.

After the purchase by Altrad was completed in September 2022, DB was renamed Altrad Babcock.

== Company products and services ==
=== Thermal ===
Doosan Babcock provides a range of through-life services to the thermal power industry, including project design and construction, plant maintenance, asset integrity, shutdown/turnaround management, plant life extension and upgrades.

The company provides OEM boilers to power plants burning traditional and renewable fuels, plus a range of firing technologies, subcritical or supercritical systems and unit sizes from 100MW to 660MW and above. It has a license agreement with Harbin Boiler, the largest boiler maker in China. Doosan Babcock is the developer of the thermal OxyCoalTM oxy-fuel boiler, used at the Vattenfall Oxyfuel pilot plant in Schwarze Pumpe in Germany. Oxy-fuel boilers use pure oxygen rather than air as the primary oxidant to reduce fuel consumption and emissions. The company is active in the carbon capture and storage sector and was responsible for designing, building and commissioning the UK's largest carbon capture pilot plant in Ferrybridge, West Yorkshire, which began operations in November 2011. The project, which uses the company's advanced amine scrubbing technology is a collaboration between SSE, Doosan Babcock and Vattenfall, and is the first of its size to be integrated into a live power plant in the UK.

=== Nuclear ===
Doosan Babcock has been a major supplier of specialist services to the nuclear industry for around 60 years, since it built the steam raising plant for the world's first commercial nuclear power station, Calder Hall UK, in 1956.

Approximately 3500 Suitably Qualified and Experienced Personnel (SQEP) offer engineering, procurement and construction (EPC), plant maintenance and decommissioning services to the nuclear power industry in the form of specialist support teams, bespoke projects and turnkey solutions. The company has a presence at every nuclear power generating site in the UK.

As a specialist provider of nuclear decommissioning services, Doosan Babcock has managed decommissioning projects at sites around the UK, including Sellafield, Faslane and Bradwell. The company offers techniques and processes for the removal of radioactive waste and the remediation of nuclear facilities. It is at the forefront of waste encapsulation technologies.

=== Oil, gas and petrochemical ===
Doosan Babcock provides project design and construction, plant maintenance, asset integrity assessment, shutdown/turnaround management, plant life extension and upgrade services to the global oil, gas and petrochemical industry.

The company's oil, gas and petrochemical clients include BP, Equinor, Shell, Essar, Total, ConocoPhillips, ExxonMobil, SABIC and Nippon Gohsei.

=== Technologies ===
Doosan Babcock develops and manufactures proprietary safety assessment tools such as the pipe vibration meter, a hazardous area logger and a pipe reeling test rig, and can repair and replace plant components in large workshops in Europe and Asia.

The company also deploys a range of asset integrity assessment technologies, which include non-destructive testing, laser 3D scanning and remote visual inspection.

== Safety record and awards ==
Doosan Babcock achieved eight million man-hours without a lost time incident (LTI) at INEOS Grangemouth in Scotland and 10 million man-hours without an LTI on an emissions-reduction project at Castle Peak Power Station in Hong Kong.

In 2013 the company was presented with the ExxonMobil Fawley Site Contractor Safety Award and the British Safety Council's Sword of Honour for best practices in Health and Safety.

In 2012 Doosan Babcock completed over 36,000 field welds with a 99.88% success rate.

The Grangemouth site in the east of Scotland, recently achieved 12 million man hours without a lost time incident (LTI). This helped them achieve the prestigious British Safety Council's Sword of Honour in 2017, which was awarded to them in London.

== History ==
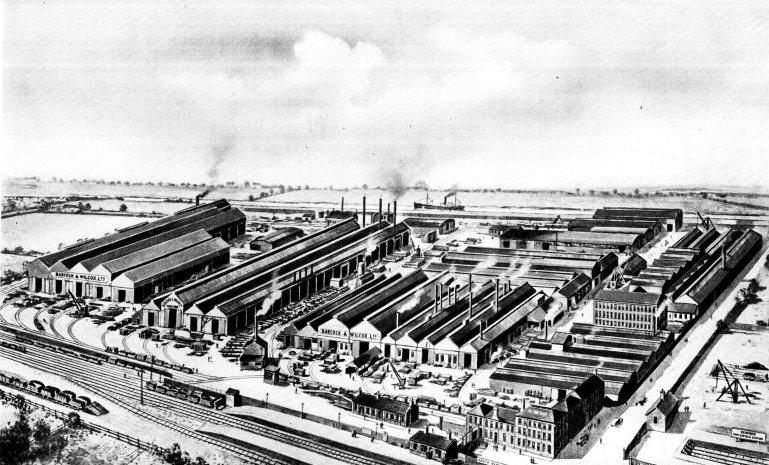
Babcock & Wilcox Limited works, Renfrew circa 1919

The US Babcock & Wilcox Company opened an office in Glasgow, Scotland in 1881. B & W commenced boiler making with and in the Singer Manufacturing Company works at Clydebank, initially using components shipped from the US.

In 1891, Babcock & Wilcox formed a British company named Babcock & Wilcox Ltd. The board members include renowned Scottish structural engineer William Arrol and Andrew Stewart, of the Lanarkshire-based steel tubemakers A & J Stewart and Menzies, subsequently Stewarts & Lloyds. A manufacturing facility at Renfrew, Scotland based on the existing Porterfield Foundry was established in 1895

In 1956, Babcock & Wilcox supplied the steam raising plant for the world's first commercial nuclear power station, Calder Hall in the UK.

Babcock Power Ltd established in 1979; later renamed Babcock Energy Ltd. Babcock Energy Ltd was floated on the stock exchange in 1982, becoming Babcock International PLC. In 1987 Babcock International entered a short-lived merger with FKI Electricals, forming FKI Babcock PLC. In 1989, FKI Babcock PLC demerged to form Babcock International Group PLC and FKI PLC.

In 1995, a 75% stake in Babcock's boiler manufacturing and energy services activities (known as Babcock Energy Ltd) was sold to Mitsui Engineering & Shipbuilding of Japan, to become Mitsui Babcock Energy Ltd. Babcock Energy Ltd provides the steam generators for the British Sizewell B nuclear power station.

Mitsui sold Babcock Energy Ltd to Doosan Heavy Industries & Construction, a subsidiary company of the Doosan Group of South Korea in 2006. The UK company is renamed Doosan Babcock Energy Ltd. In 2010, Doosan Babcock Energy Ltd renamed Doosan Power Systems Ltd, then in 2012 renamed Doosan Power Systems UK Ltd. In 2013, Doosan Power Systems UK Ltd renamed as Doosan Babcock Ltd. The same year Doosan Babcock Ltd invested £20 million in UK test facility and research and development activities. New offices opened in Europe, the Middle East and Asia.
