= HMS Forest Moor =

Former Royal Navy base in North Yorkshire, England

Coordinates: 54°0′42″N 1°43′16″W

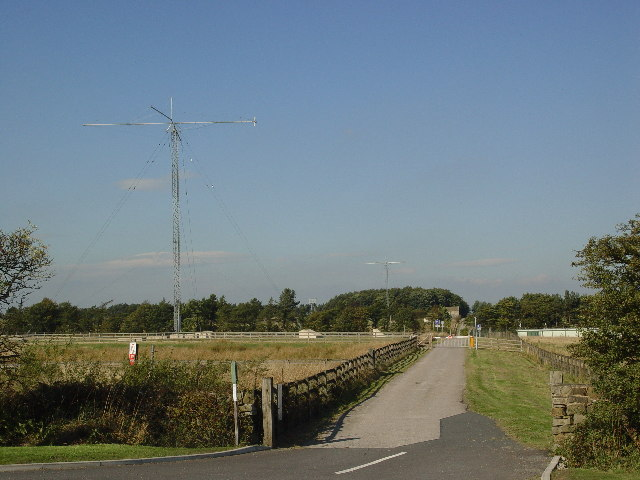
- HMS Forest Moor aerial

History

United Kingdom
- Name: HMS Forest Moor
- Commissioned: October 1960
- Decommissioned: November 2003

General characteristics
- Class & type: Stone frigate
- Notes: 40 acres (16 ha)

HMS Forest Moor was a Royal Navy land base located in Nidderdale in the Borough of Harrogate, North Yorkshire, England.

== History ==
The establishment was first used as one of the Second World War intelligence units, or Y-stations.

In 1960 it became the Royal Navy's major high frequency (HF) receiver station, its primary function was to route HF signals from locations abroad to military bases and command centres in the UK. The base was manned by a small group of Royal Naval radio operators and electricians (approximately six to a shift).

This centre provided HF comms receiver links to bases in the Indian Ocean, Mediterranean, Canada and a RATT ship/shore receiver link to warships at sea. Transmitters were located at HMS Inskip in Lancashire.

It also had a small ships company (including an RPO, a PO Caterer and chefs) for the day-to-day running of the establishment, including three civilian drivers.

HMS Forest Moor was also the setting of a short-lived YTV comedy Thundercloud starring James Cosmo on a stone frigate which the Royal Navy confuse with an actual ship.

In 2003 it was transferred to VT Communications (now Babcock International) under a PPP contract to provide HF communications to the Ministry of Defence via the Defence Communication Services Agency. It is now operated by civilian personnel, from a 190-acre (78 ha) site on Meagill Lane adjacent to the old Forest Moor site.

In 2010, the residential site was disposed of by Defence Estates to North Yorkshire County Council for £4.7 million. The site has been converted to a school for children with behavioural, emotional and social difficulties.
