= Doosan Lentjes =

German engineering company

Doosan Lentjes GmbH
- Industry: Energy services
- Founded: 1928
- Headquarters: Ratingen, Germany
- Parent: Doosan Group
- Website: www.doosanlentjes.com

Doosan Lentjes GmbH is a subsidiary of Doosan Enerbility. It is a company specializing in engineering, design and construction that provides proprietary waste-to-energy and sewage sludge services and technologies, circulating fluidized bed (CFB) and air quality control systems for thermal power generation.

The company was founded as a boiler manufacturing company by Ferdinand Lentjes in 1928. Doosan Lentjes's main headquarters are located in Ratingen, Germany.

== Products and services ==
The company offers precision steam turbines from its partner business, Doosan Škoda Power. Around 77 Doosan Lentjes units are in operation internationally.

In 2011, the company installed the grate, boiler and balance of the Harlingen waste-to-energy plant. In 2008, the AVA Frankfurt Nordweststadt four-line waste incineration plant began operating. Existing incineration lines were replaced with new ones.

Since mid-2013, Doosan Lentjes has been working with E.ON’s coal-fired Provence power plant in Gardanne, France, to convert the existing coal-fired boiler, built and installed by Doosan Lentjes in 1992, into a biomass unit.

=== Air quality control systems ===
Doosan Lentjes develops wet limestone flue gas desulphurisation (FGD), seawater FGD and dry-circulating "fluidised" bed technologies. It also supplies high- and low-pressure pulse jet fabric filters and electrostatic precipitator de-dusters.

In 2009, Doosan Lentjes fitted wet limestone FGD plants at Rugeley power station, United Kingdom, to meet the European Large Combustion Plant Directive, which requires a 94% removal rate of sulphurous compounds from flue gases. At the Gheco One power plant in Thailand, Doosan Lentjes designed a seawater FGD system that makes use of seawater from the steam turbine unit. It has been operating since 2012.

As of 2013, Doosan Lentjes has installed over 280 wet FGD units and over 800 dedusting plants internationally.

== History ==
In 1928, Ferdinand Lentjes founded Doosan Lentjes. Doosan Lentjes designed and built the first CFB boiler featuring a "fluidized" bed heat "exchanger" (FBHE) in Germany in 1982.

The company acquired Burmeister & Wain A/S in 1980 and Gottfried Bischoff GmbH in 1984. In 1990, Metallgesellschaft acquired Lentjes. In 2005, Lurgi Lentjes AG was renamed "Lentjes GmbH".

In 2007, Lentjes GmbH was acquired by AE&E to form AE&E Lentjes, which was later sold to Korea’s Doosan Group to form Doosan Lentjes GmbH in 2011.
