= Doosan Power Systems =

- Industry: Energy services
- Headquarters: Crawley, England
- Key people: CEO Mr. Myong Dong Ryu
- Parent: Doosan Heavy Industries & Construction Co., Ltd
- Subsidiaries: Doosan Babcock; Doosan Lentjes; Doosan Skoda Power
- Website: www.doosanpowersystems.com

Doosan Power Systems is a holding company in the power generation industry that provides shared IT, communications, legal, financial and other administrative services to its subsidiary companies:

- Doosan Babcock is a power sector OEM, construction, upgrade and after-market services company that offers specialist technologies to the fossil-fired power generation, nuclear power generation, and oil, gas and petrochemical industries.
- Doosan Lentjes is a specialist engineering, design and construction business that provides proprietary waste-to-energy services and technologies, circulating fluidised bed (CFB) boiler technologies and air quality control systems (AQCS) to the thermal power generation, industrial and municipal sectors.
- Doosan Škoda Power is an OEM steam turbine designer and manufacturer that provides systems, components and maintenance services to fossil and nuclear power generation plants, municipal waste-to-energy and biomass incineration plants, and any manufacturing or petrochemicals application that requires turbo generator technology.

Doosan Power Systems' headquarters are located in Crawley, England. Its parent company is Doosan Heavy Industries and Construction (DHIC) in Korea.
