= VT Communications =

- Formerly: Merlin Communications; VT Merlin Communications
- Predecessor: BBC World Service transmitter sites
- Defunct: July 8, 2010
- Fate: Acquired and merged into Babcock International Group
- Headquarters: Blue Fin Building, London, England
- Parent: VT Group plc.

VT Communications was a company that was a part of VT Group plc. VT Communications was essentially formed as a result of the privatization of the BBC World Service transmitter sites. It was initially named Merlin Communications, then, after acquisition by VT, VT Merlin Communications. It provided transmission services to over 20 different customers from four main sites in the United Kingdom and many others in the rest of the world.

In 2003, the VT Communications was awarded a £228m public private partnership contract to operate the Defence High Frequency Communications Service for a period of fifteen years on behalf of the Ministry of Defence.

It was based at the Blue Fin Building on London's South Bank, which hosted the company's broadcast Media Management Centre and where it formed part of Babcock International Group, after its acquisition on 8 July 2010.

== National Physical Laboratory time signal ==
Starting in 1950, the National Physical Laboratory time signal, the UK's national time reference, was broadcast on 60 kHz from the MSF transmitter at Rugby radio station by BT Communications, which was under licence from the NPL. When that contract expired, VT Communications was awarded the new licence and, following successful testing in early 2007, took over broadcasting the signal from its new location at Anthorn radio station. The formal inauguration of the new facility took place on 1 April 2007, when the signal from Rugby was permanently switched off, and the name of the service was then changed to "The Time from NPL."

== Main transmission sites in the UK ==
- Woofferton
- Rampisham
- Skelton
- Orfordness
- Anthorn
