= RAF Milltown =

Former RAF station in Moray, Scotland

RAF Milltown RNAS Milltown HMS Fulmar II
- Near Elgin, Moray in Scotland
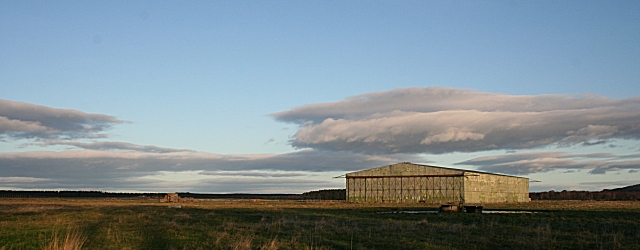
- A former hangar at Milltown during 2008.

Site information
- Type: Royal Air Force station
- Owner: Ministry of Defence
- Operator: Royal Air Force (1941–1946 and 1977–2001); Royal Navy (1946–1977); DCSA (2001–2006)
- Controlled by: RAF Coastal Command (1941-1946); Fleet Air Arm (1946–1977)
- Condition: Disused

Location
- Location in Moray RAF Milltown (the United Kingdom)
- Coordinates: 57°40′12″N 003°14′04″W

Site history
- Built: 1941
- In use: 1941–2006
- Fate: Farmland / Industry
- Battles/wars: European theatre of World War II; Cold War

Airfield information
Runways
Direction	Length and surface
05/23	5,700 feet (1,737 m) Concrete/Tarmac
11/29	4,620 feet (1,408 m) Concrete/Tarmac
17/35	4,200 feet (1,280 m) Concrete/Tarmac

Royal Air Force Milltown or RAF Milltown is a former Royal Air Force station located south of the Moray Firth and 3.6 miles (5.8 km) north east of Elgin, Scotland.

Flying stopped in 1977 and the site became a defence communication station. The site was returned to previous owners the Innes estate and will become the site of a solar farm.

== History ==
=== Establishment ===
RAF Milltown, was originally established as a decoy airfield, for RAF Lossiemouth which is located 3 miles (4.8 kilometres) to the north west. Decoy airfields, known as 'Q sites', were typically located close to real airfields and would be illuminated at night in the hope that any attack by enemy aircraft would be carried out on the decoy rather than the actual airfield. On 27 October 1941, the decoy site was abandoned and work commenced on constructing a real airfield which was intended for use by an operational training unit of RAF Coastal Command with a secondary role as an RAF Bomber Command forward operating location.

Three runways were constructed: 05/23 (5,700 ft (1,737.3 m) in length); 11/29 (4,620 ft (1,408.1 m)); and 17/35 (4,200 ft (1,280.1 m)), which were accompanied by twenty-seven aircraft hardstandings around a perimeter track. Two hangars were built, a T2 type in the southern side of the airfield within the technical area and a B1 type on the northern side. The eastern edge of the airfield accommodated a bomb store.

=== RAF operations ===
At the time the airfield opened on 14 June 1943, Coastal Command no longer required its use, and therefore the first occupants were C-flight of Bomber Command's No. 20 Operational Training Unit (No. 20 OTU) which was based at RAF Lossiemouth. C-flight trained crews to fly the Vickers Wellington medium bomber until demand reduced and it left on 1 September 1944.

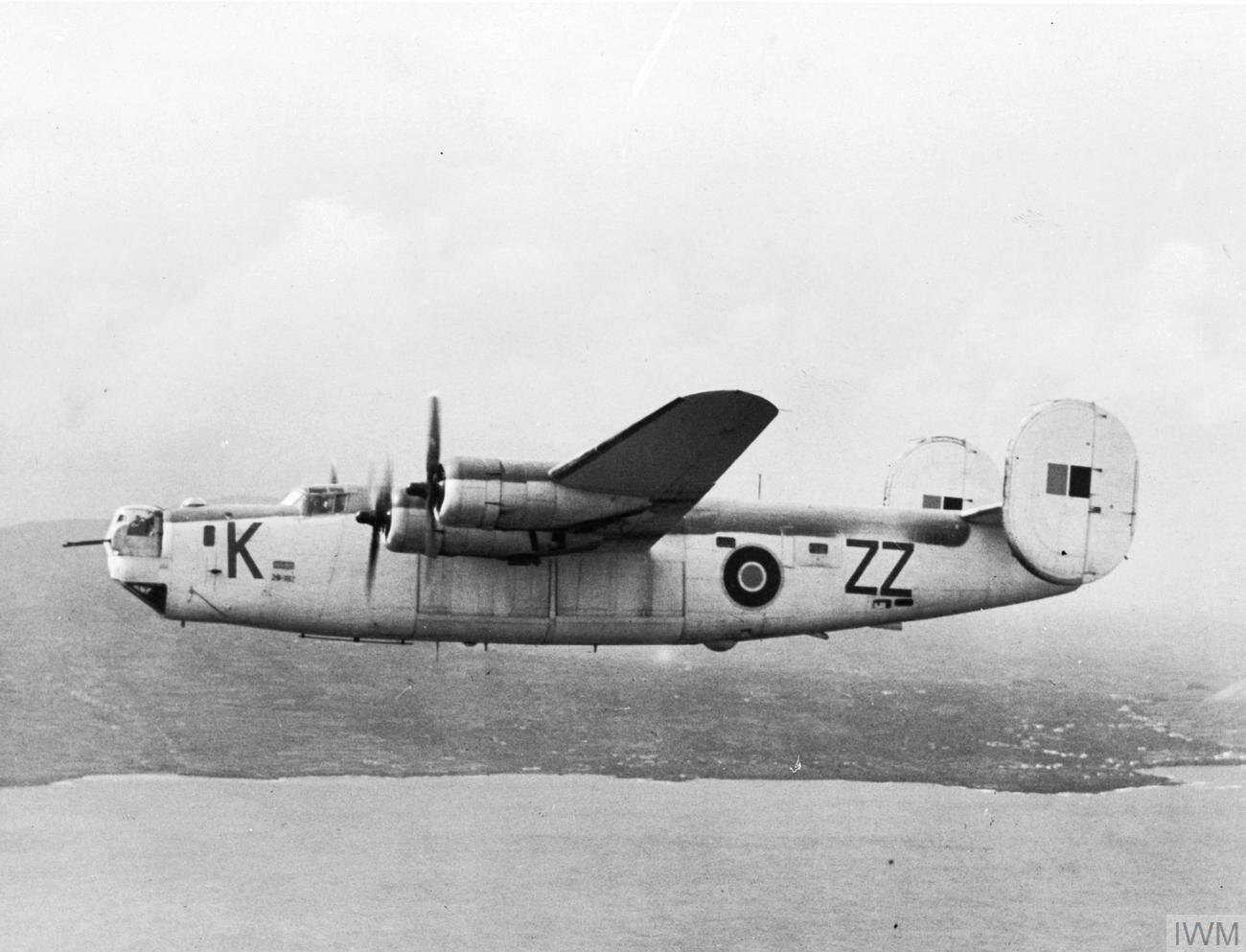
A Consolidated Liberator GR.VI of the type flown from RAF Milltown by No. 224 Squadron during 1944 and 1945

Coastal Command subsequently took control of the station and the first unit arrived on 15 September 1944 was No. 224 Squadron from RAF St. Eval, flying the Consolidated Liberator GR.VI. The squadron flew patrols searching for German U-boats and ships in the seas around Norway and Denmark, with at least four U-boats being sunk or damaged by the squadron during September and October 1944. During the winter of 1944 and 1945, many stations located further south were fog-bound which resulted in Milltown being used as a diversion airfield for large numbers of bomber aircraft. This included on 21 December 1944 when forty-six aircraft diverted to Milltown, a mixture of Avro Lancasters, Boeing Fortresses and Liberators.

Milltown was used during 1944 as base to launch missions to sink the German battleship Tirpitz which at the time was operating in Norwegian fjords. Twelve Lancasters of No. 617 Squadron left Milltown on 29 October 1944 as part of Operation Obviate and joined other aircraft operating from RAF Lossiemouth and RAF Kinloss. That mission was unsuccessful, however a further attempt known as Operation Catechism, finally resulted in the battleship being sunk near Tromsø on 12 November 1944.

No. 224 Squadron began conversion to the Liberator GR.VIII in November 1944. The unit temporarily moved to Lossiemouth whilst one of Milltown's runways was repaired during January 1945, continuing patrols until 2 June and then returning to RAF St. Eval in July.

No. 311 Squadron, a Czechoslovak-manned unit equipped with Liberators, moved to Milltown at the end of the war. It had been operating from RAF Predennack and RAF Tain, carrying out the anti-submarine operations, however it had recently been transferred to RAF Transport Command and whilst at Milltown re-quipped with the Liberator GR.VI. It disbanded in February 1946. Meanwhile, two new units arrived, No. 111 Operational Training Unit equipped with the Liberator & the Handley Page Halifax and No. 1674 Heavy Conversion Unit also equipped with the Liberator.

=== Royal Navy operations ===
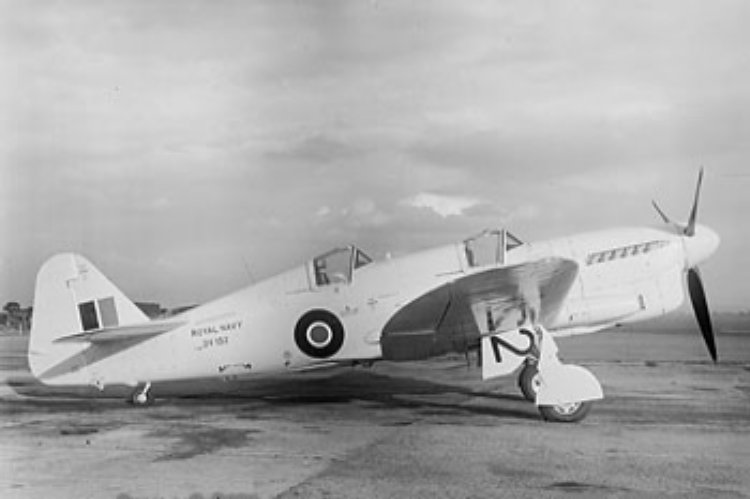
A Fairey Firefly T.1 of the type operated by 736 Naval Air Squadron at RAF Miltown

Along with RAF Lossiemouth, Milltown was transferred from the RAF to the Fleet Air Arm (FAA) on 2 July 1946 and became known as HMS Fulmar II. On transfer of the station, No. 111 OTU and No. 1674 HCU disbanded. The FAA established the airfield as a Deck Landing Training School, with the airfield equipped with a mirror landing aid to allow pilots to practice simulated aircraft carrier landings, known as Mirror Aerodrome Dummy Deck Landings or MADDLs. Training was completed at Fulmar II before students progressed to landing on HMS Theseus in the Moray Firth. The first FAA unit to use Milltown was 767 Naval Air Squadron which flew the Fairey Firefly, North American Harvard and Supermarine Seafire. Activity was subsequently increased when the Seafires of 766 Naval Air Squadron also utilised the airfield. Between 1958 and 1962, the Lossiemouth Handling Squadron flew the Gloster Meteor TT.20, a target towing version of the jet fighter. Other squadrons to use the airfield were 736 Naval Air Squadron, 738 Naval Air Squadron, 759 Naval Air Squadron and 764 Naval Air Squadron. These units flew a wide range of naval fixed-wing aircraft including the Blackburn Buccaneer, Hawker Hunter, Hawker Sea Fury, de Havilland Sea Hornet, de Havilland Sea Vampire, and Supermarine Scimitar.

=== Return of the RAF and drawdown of flying ===
Milltown and Lossiemouth were transferred back to the RAF in September 1972. Thereafter, no permanent flying units were based at Milltown, although the RAF continued to use the airfield for deploying aircraft on exercise as it had done during the navy's tenure. This included Lockheed C-130 Hercules on exercise during 1968; Hawker Siddeley Harriers of No. 1 Squadron in March and April 1971, supported by nine Hercules, three Hawker Siddeley Andovers, seven Armstrong Whitworth Argosys and a Short Belfast; and four Harriers in 1972 for Exercise Snowy Owl. Milltown closed for flying in March 1977.

The site was retained by the RAF as a high frequency signals station, with some 50 masts transmitting on the RAF VOLMET (using a 600W transmitter) and RAF STCICS systems. The signals station closed in December 2003 when the RAF's high frequency communications system was replaced by the Defence High Frequency Communications Service. The site was sold in 2013 to the Innes Estate and returned to agriculture

== Units and aircraft ==
List of flying units permanently based at Milltown.

Source: Unless otherwise indicated details sourced are from: Hughes, Jim. (1999), A Steep Turn to the Stars. Peterborough, GMS Enterprises. ISBN 1 870384 71 7, pp. 79–82

Service	Unit	Aircraft / Role	From	Date From	Date To	To
RAF	No. 20 Operational Training Unit (C Flight)	Vickers Wellington	RAF Lossiemouth	5 September 1943	1 September 1944	
RAF	No. 224 Squadron	Consolidated Liberator	RAF St. Eval	15 September 1944	July 1945	RAF St. Eval
RAF	No. 311 Squadron	Consolidated Liberator	RAF Tain	15 February 1946	15 February 1946	Disbanded
RAF	No. 111 Operational Training Unit	Consolidated Liberator, Handley Page Halifax	The Bahamas	July 1945	1946	Disbanded
RAF	No. 1674 Heavy Conversion Unit	Consolidated Liberator		July 1945	1946	
FAA	767 Naval Air Squadron	Fairey Firefly, North American Harvard, Supermarine Seafire				
FAA	766 Naval Air Squadron	Supermarine Seafire				
FAA	Lossiemouth Handling Squadron	Gloster Meteor TT.20		1958	1962	
Civil	Fulmar Gliding Club				1976	RAF Kinloss
Civil	Highland Gliding Club			1971	October 1975	Dallachy Airfield
RAF	No. 663 Volunteer Gliding Squadron			1973	February 1977	RAF Kinloss
RAF	No. 81 Signals Unit – Detachment (North)	High frequency communications		1977	2003–2006	Role transferred to DHFCS.

== Current use ==
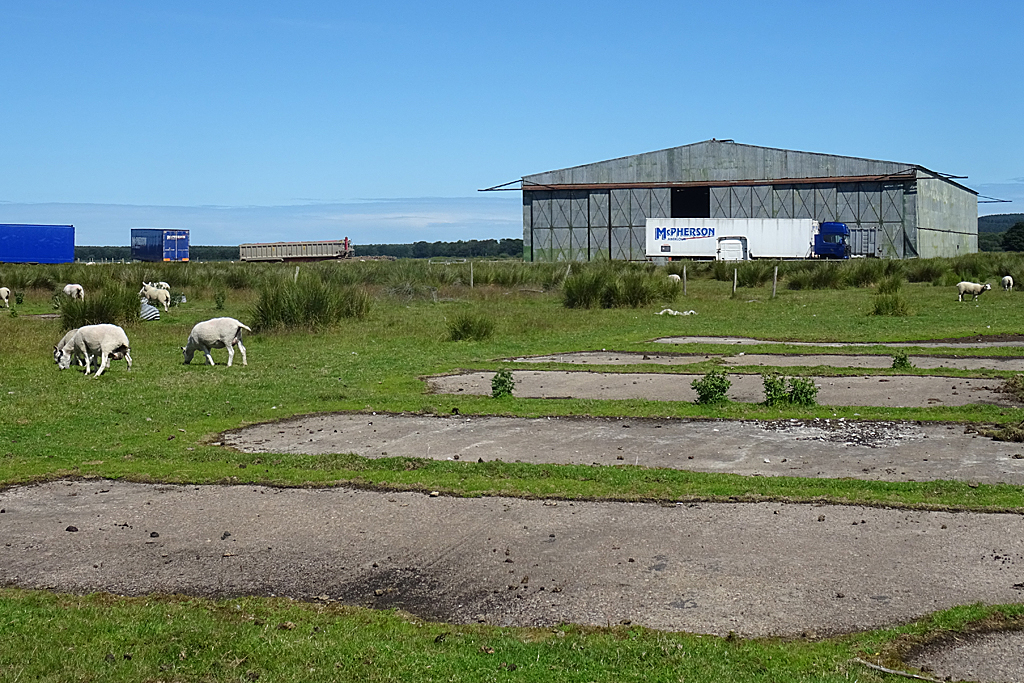
Sheep on RAF Milltown in 2020

The majority of the runways and taxiways are intact but a number of the aircraft stands have been removed. The area has been used for a variety of activities, including storage, truck testing and livestock grazing.

=== 2018 – planning for construction of a Solar PV power plant ===
2017-12-06 the Planning and Regulatory Services Committee of Moray Council agreed to raise no objection to the 50 MW Milltown Airfield Solar PV proposal. The project was approved in May 2018 by the Scottish Government as the first solar project to be approved by the Energy Consents Unit (ECU). The Solar Power plant will have a peak power of 50 MW_{p} and include 200 000 solar panels. Assuming an insolation of 1160 kWh/m^{2}yr this corresponds to a capacity factor of approximately 13% and an annual production of 58 GWh/yr, or 15 000 homes each with a consumption of 3 900 kWh/yr.

== See also ==
- List of former Royal Air Force stations
