= Anthorn =

Village in Cumbria, England

Coordinates: 54.914689°N 3.257294°W

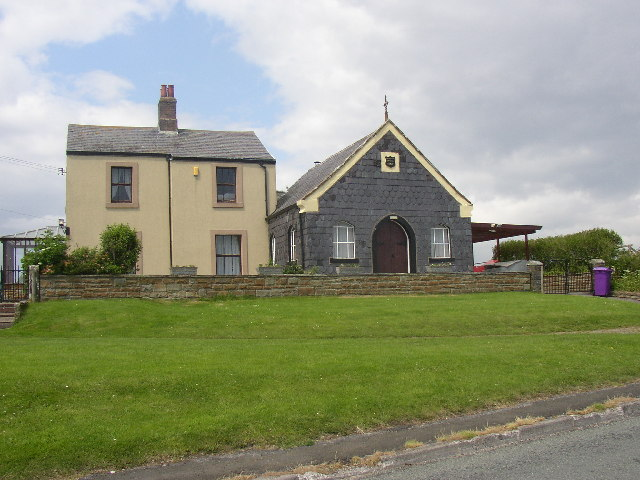
- Former chapel, Anthorn

- Location in Allerdale, Cumbria Location within Cumbria
- Population: 235 (2001 census)
- OS grid reference: NY195585
- Civil parish: Bowness
- Unitary authority: Cumberland
- Ceremonial county: Cumbria
- Region: North West
- Country: England
- Sovereign state: United Kingdom
- Post town: Wigton
- Postcode district: CA7
- Dialling code: 016973
- Police: Cumbria
- Fire: Cumbria
- Ambulance: North West
- UK Parliament: Penrith and Solway

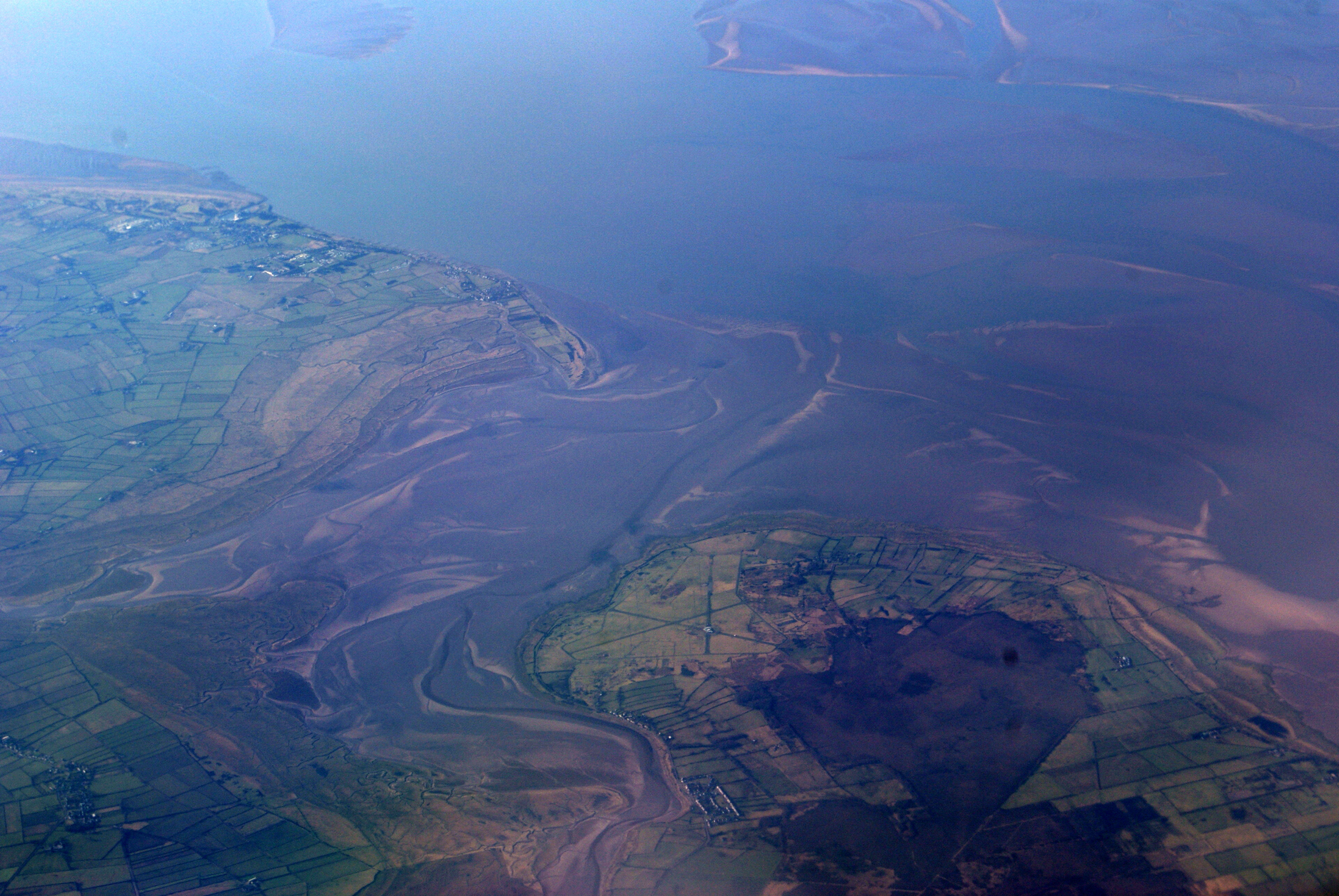
Anthorn and Moricambe Bay

Anthorn (pronounced /ˈænθɔːrn/ AN-thorn) is a village in Cumbria, England. Historically in Cumberland, it is situated on the south side of the Solway Firth, on the Wampool estuary, about 13 miles (21 km) west of Carlisle. It is the location of the Anthorn radio station, broadcasting specialised low frequency signals for timekeeping and navigation.

== History ==
Originally no more than a cluster of cottages and small farms on the shore, the village increased in size and importance in 1942, when an existing First World War landing strip was developed as HMS Nuthatch, a Royal Naval Air Station. The RAF station closed in 1958, and is now the site of Anthorn Radio Station, a large mast field for the NATO VLF transmitter, the NPL time signal and an eLoran timing signal. The Admiralty housing development, larger than the original village itself and about 0.62 miles (1 km) to the east, remains. In 1870–72 the township had a population of 197.

== Governance ==
Anthorn is part of the parliamentary constituency of Penrith and Solway. Since the 2024 general election, it has been represented by Markus Campbell-Savours of the Labour Party.

For Local Government purposes Anthorn is in the Cumberland Unitary Authority area.

== See also ==
- Listed buildings in Bowness
