= Doosan Škoda Power =

Czech power station equipment manufacturer

Doosan Škoda Power a.s.
- Type: Public
- Traded as: PSE: DSPW; PX Index component
- Industry: Power engineering
- Predecessor: Škoda Works
- Founded: 1993; 33 years ago
- Headquarters: Plzeň, Czech Republic
- Key people: Youngki Lim (chairman and CEO)
- Products: Steam turbines, condensers and heat exchangers
- Services: Equipment installation, modernisation and maintenance
- Revenue: 5,631,664,000 Czech koruna (2025)
- Operating income: 625,067,000 Czech koruna (2025)
- Net income: 521,430,000 Czech koruna (2025)
- Total assets: 8,248,128,000 Czech koruna (2025)
- Total equity: CZK 4.871 billion (2025)
- Number of employees: 1,069 (2025)
- Parent: Doosan Power Systems
- Website: www.doosanskodapower.com

Doosan Škoda Power is a Czech engineering company based in Plzeň that develops and manufactures steam turbines and associated equipment. Its turbines are used to generate electricity and provide steam for factories and district heating. Its service business covers turbine repairs, modernisation, spare parts and long-term maintenance for both Škoda machines and those made by other manufacturers.

Its turbine business originated within Škoda Works, which began producing steam turbines in 1904. The company became part of the South Korean Doosan group in 2009, and its shares began trading on the Prague Stock Exchange on 6 February 2025.

== Operations and products ==
=== Turbines and associated equipment ===
Doosan Škoda Power designs and manufactures steam turbines for electricity generation and combined heat and power production. The company supplies turbines for nuclear power stations, gas-fired combined-cycle plants and factories. It also makes turbines for district heating and for plants that burn coal, biomass or municipal waste. Its industrial turbines include back-pressure and condensing designs, with steam extraction for factory processes or heating. It builds steam turbines to customers’ specifications, with outputs of 3–1,300 MW.

Doosan Škoda Power also makes condensers and supplies heat exchangers for power stations and district heating. It can supply the equipment separately or undertake a larger project, from design and construction through installation and commissioning. ORLEN contracted the company to replace two turbine sets at its Płock heat and power plant in Poland. Each new unit has an output of 55 MW and the contract also covers long-term maintenance.

=== Modernisation and services ===
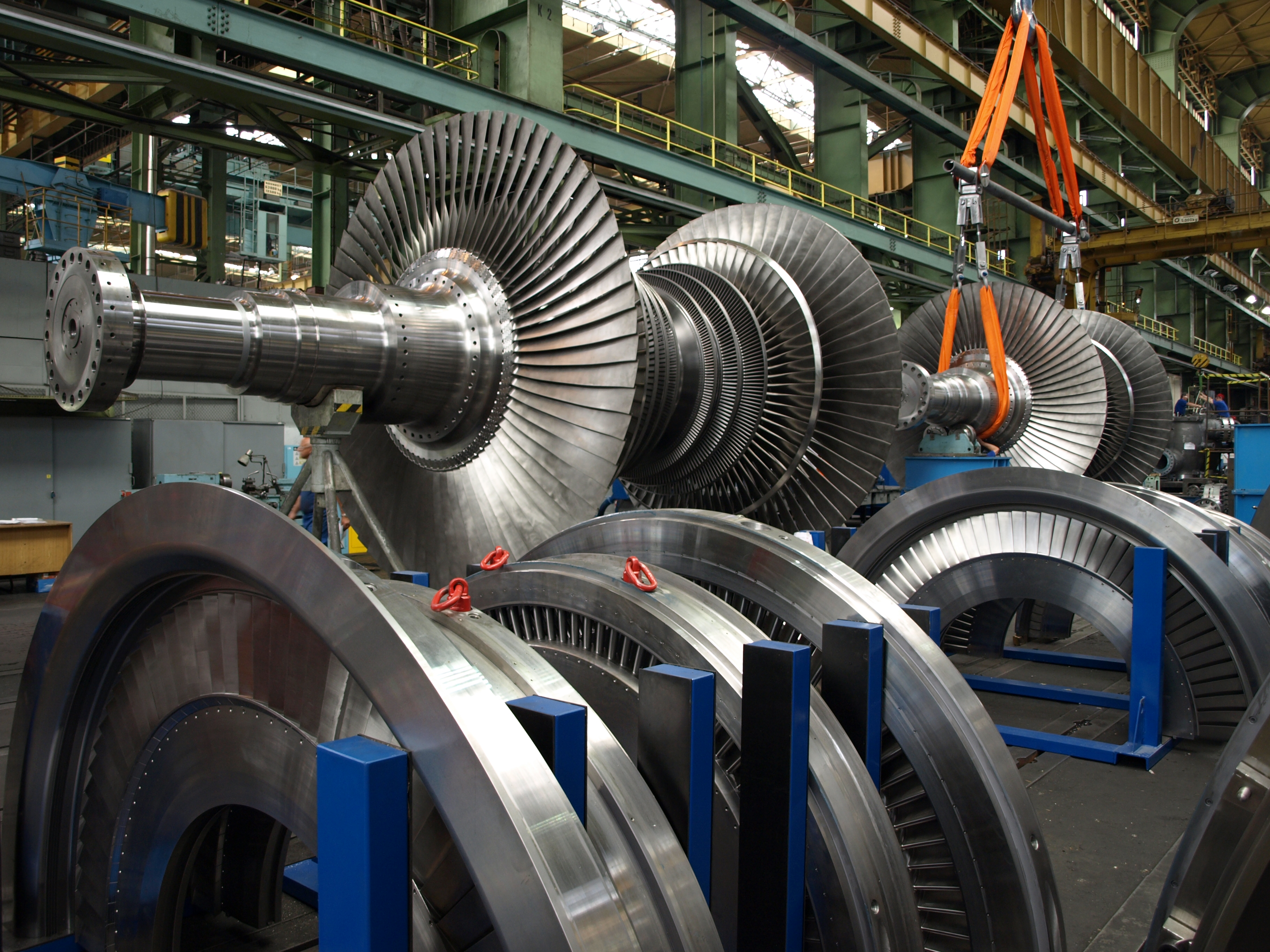
Steam turbine of Doosan Škoda Power

Doosan Škoda Power repairs and modernises turbines built by Škoda and other manufacturers. Its service work includes supplying spare parts and maintaining equipment under long-term contracts. Its nuclear modernisation projects include replacing low-pressure turbine components at Fortum’s Loviisa power plant in Finland. The work, scheduled for annual outages between 2026 and 2028, is expected to increase the plant’s generating capacity by approximately 38 MW.

In 2025, ČEZ contracted Doosan Škoda Power to replace the generators at the Temelín nuclear power plant and maintain them for 15 years. Doosan Škoda Power is the main contractor for the replacement work. Doosan Enerbility supplies the components and provides technical support. In February 2026, Doosan Škoda Power also signed a contract with Doosan Enerbility to supply steam turbines and turbine control systems for Dukovany’s planned fifth and sixth nuclear units.

== Research and development ==
Doosan Škoda Power conducts research on improving turbine efficiency and, studying blade vibration and developing protection against erosion caused by water. Its experimental facilities include 1 MW and 10 MW steam turbines, air and steam tunnels, and equipment for testing blades and bearings.

Between 2018 and 2023, it participated in the LoStr project with the University of West Bohemia, investigating turbine efficiency and rotor stability. In 2022, researchers from the University of West Bohemia, Doosan Škoda Power and LaserTherm published their work on protecting turbine blades against erosion. They used a laser scanner to measure each blade, then guided a robot along its leading edge to apply a protective alloy coating.

Doosan Škoda Power has also worked with Research Centre Řež on a turbine driven by supercritical carbon dioxide instead of steam. Its research into organic Rankine cycles focuses on using waste heat and generating power in small biomass plants. It also contributes to turbine and power-cycle development in ASTERIx-CAESar, a Horizon Europe project running from 2023 to 2027 that investigates combining concentrated solar power with compressed-air energy storage.

== History ==
| Year | Points of note |
|---|---|
| 1859 | Count Waldstein establishes the original engineering workshop. |
| 1869 | Emil Škoda purchases the Waldstein workshop. |
| 1904 | First 412 kW steam turbine for Rateau begins operation. |
| 1911 | Rateau turbines replaced by Škoda designed turbines. |
| 1932 | First two 23 MW steam turbines are completed. |
| 1959 | 110 MW steam turbine manufacturing begins. |
| 1966 | 200 MW steam turbine manufacture commences. |
| 1976 | 220 MW steam turbine for nuclear power plants begins operation. |
| 1978 | 500 MW steam turbines introduced. |
| 1992 | 1000 MW steam turbine for nuclear power plants begins operation. |
| 1993 | Privatisation. New subsidiaries established within ŠKODA a.s. |
| 1994 | Agreement to form a co-operative company in Guangzhou, China, Škoda Jinma Turbines, Ltd. |
| 1998 | Škoda Controls s.r.o., Škoda Elektrické Stroje s.r.o., Škoda Etd s.r.o. and Škoda TURBÍNY s.r.o. merge to form Škoda Energo. |
| 2004 | Škoda Energo becomes Škoda Power s.r.o. |
| 2005 | Škoda Power establishes Indian subsidiary Škoda Power India Pvt. Ltd. |
| 2006 | Škoda Power founded as a joint-stock company, born out of the transformed Škoda Power s.r.o. |
| 2007 | 660 MW USC turbine unit for the Ledvice power plant in the Czech Republic begins operation. |
| 2008 | Innovative 1220 mm turbine blades introduced. |
| 2009 | Škoda Power joins Doosan Group. |
| 2011 | Enhanced research and development facilities completed. |
| 2012 | Company renamed Doosan Škoda Power. |
| 2013 | New global R&D centre within Turbogenerators Business Group opened. |
