= Bradwell nuclear power station =

Decommissioned nuclear power plant in England

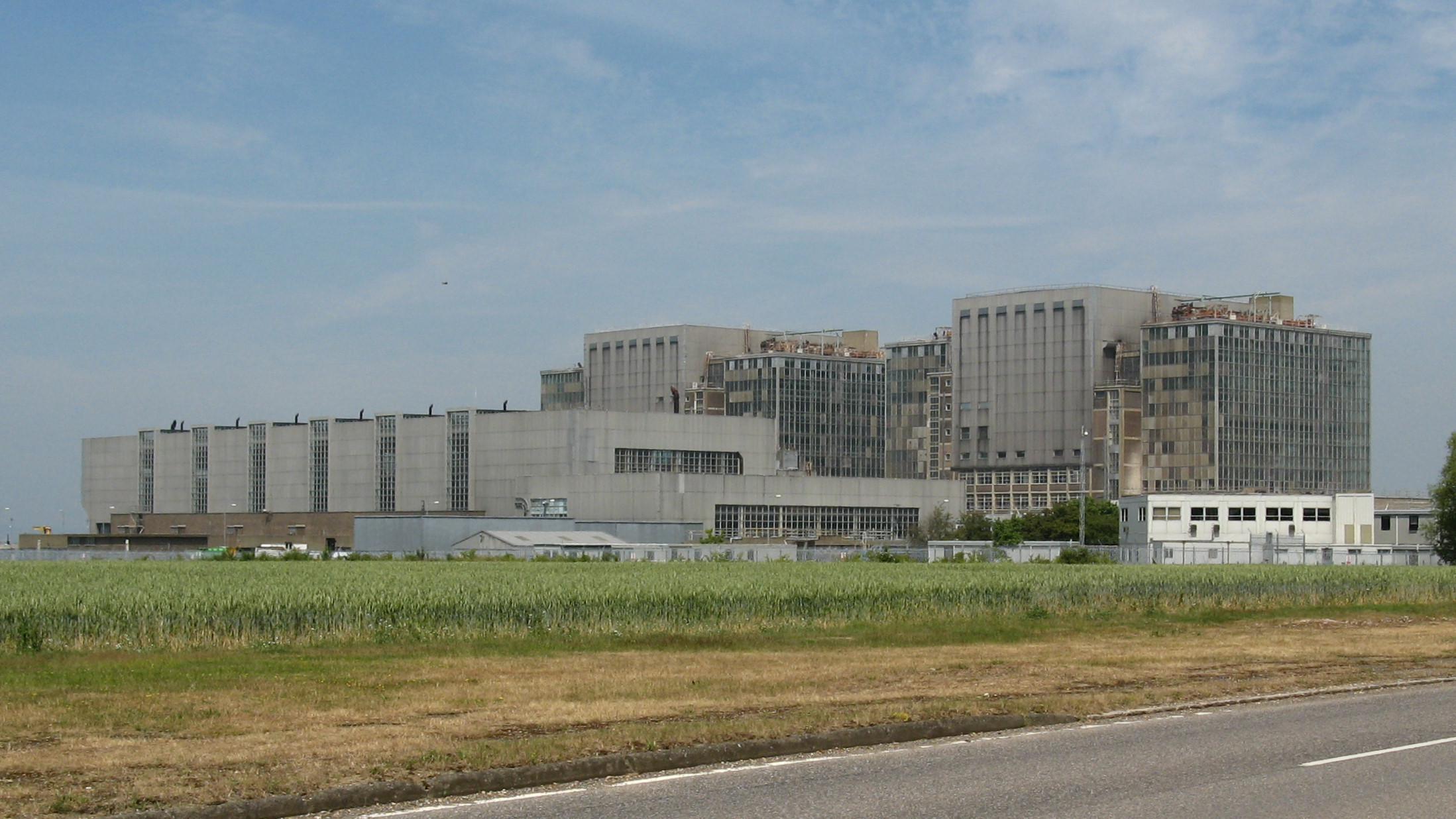
- Country: England
- Location: Bradwell-on-Sea, Essex
- Coordinates: 51°44′29″N 0°53′49″E
- Status: Decommissioning in progress
- Construction began: 1957
- Commission date: 1962
- Decommission date: 2002
- Owner: Nuclear Decommissioning Authority
- Operator: Nuclear Restoration Services

Nuclear power station
- Reactor type: Magnox
- Reactor supplier: The Nuclear Power Group (TNPG)

Power generation
- Units operational: Parsons
- Units decommissioned: 2 reactors 242 MW
- Nameplate capacity: 242 MW

External links
- Website: www.magnoxsouthsites.com/about-us/our-sites/bradwell
- Commons: Related media on Commons

Bradwell nuclear power station is a Magnox-design nuclear power station that is undergoing decommissioning. It is located on the Dengie peninsula at the mouth of the River Blackwater, Essex. In 2019, it was the first nuclear power station in the UK to be placed into long-term decommissioned management. As of 2016, China General Nuclear Power Group was considering Bradwell for the site of a new nuclear power station, named Bradwell B.

== History ==
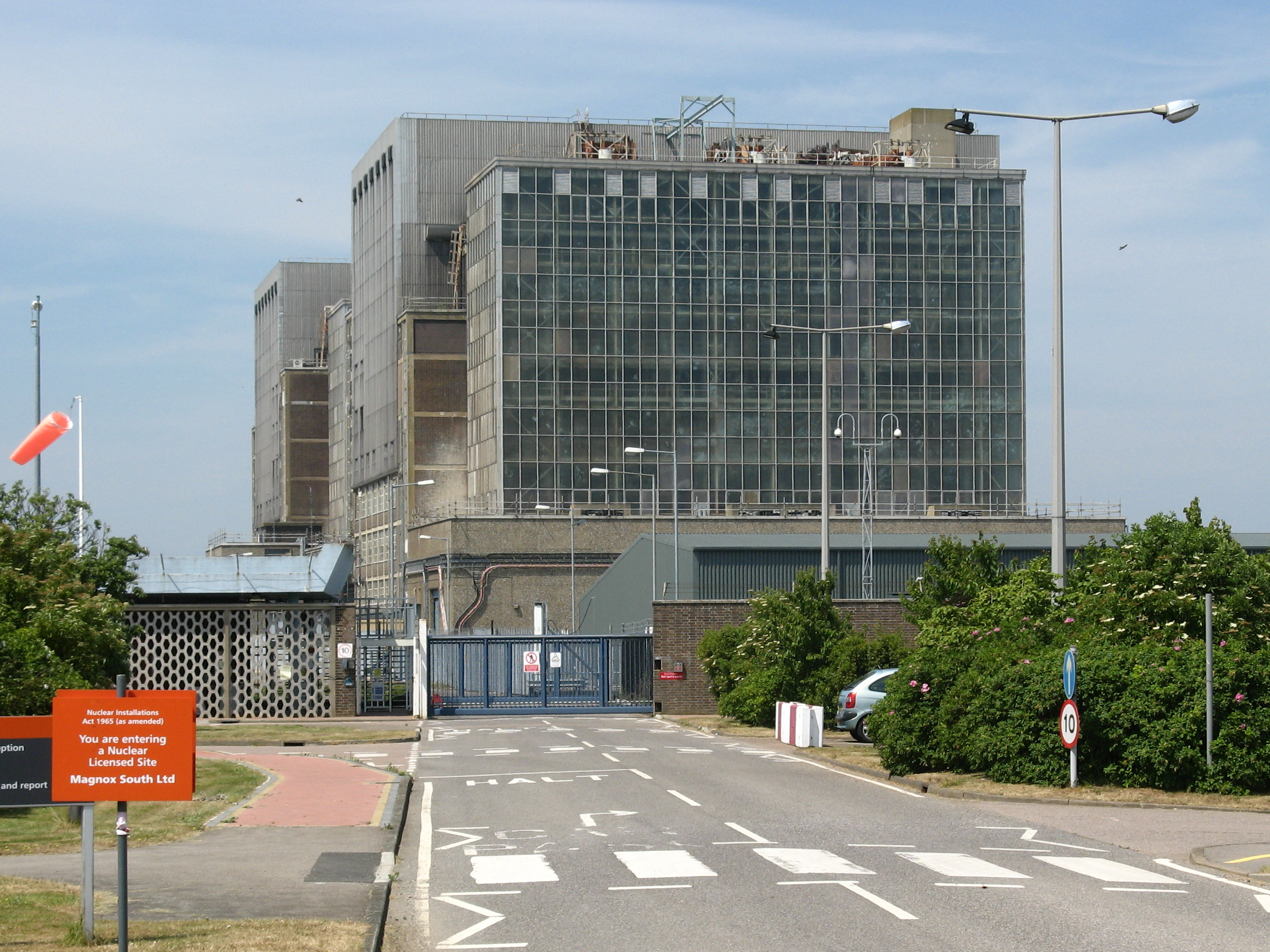
The two Magnox reactor buildings in 2010 from the entrance road

Construction of the power station by a consortium involving Clarke Chapman, Head Wrightson, C. A. Parsons & Co., A. Reyrolle & Co., Strachan & Henshaw and Whessoe and known as the Nuclear Power Plant Company (NPPC) began in December 1957, and electricity generation started in 1962.

Bradwell had two Magnox-design reactors with a design output of 300 MW of net electrical output, although this was reduced to 242 MW net electrical in total as a result of the discovery of breakaway oxidation of mild-steel components inside the reactor vessel. The reactors were supplied by The Nuclear Power Group (TNPG), and the nine turbines and 12 gas circulators by C. A. Parsons & Co. (six of 52 MW main turbines supplying power to the grid, three of 22.5 MW auxiliaries turbines, one for each reactor for driving the gas circulators, with one standby auxiliary turbine). Each reactor contained six heat exchanger units to take the heated gas from the reactors to provide steam at pressure of 730 psi (50 bar) and temperature of 371 °C (700 °F) at turbine.

Three 450 kW (600 hp) Allen 6S12-DX turbocharged diesel generators were installed in 1975 to provide essential standby supplies, replacing the three original 480 kW (640 hp) Crossley ten-cylinder two-stroke standby diesel generators.

Bradwell's peak output, achieved in the early 1960s, was nearly 10% above the design value. On a typical day it could supply enough electricity to meet the needs of towns the size of Chelmsford, Colchester and Southend.

=== Location ===
Bradwell was built on the edge of RAF Bradwell Bay, a former World War II airfield, 1.5 miles (2.4 km) from the Essex coastline. Its location was deliberately chosen, as the land had minimal agricultural value, offered easy access, was geologically sound and had an unlimited source of cooling water from the North Sea.

Nuclear fuel for Bradwell was delivered and removed via the nearest railhead, a loading facility adjacent to Southminster railway station on the Crouch Valley line. This included a dedicated siding and a gantry crane.

In 1969, a new Honeywell 316 was installed as the primary reactor temperature-monitoring computer; this was in continuous use until summer 2000, when the internal 160 kB disk failed. Two PDP-11/70s, which had previously been secondary monitors, were moved to primary.

=== Electricity output ===
Electricity output from Bradwell power station over the period 1964–1984 was as follows.

Bradwell annual electricity output GWh

=== Decommissioning ===
In 1999, it was announced that the station would cease operation in 2002 – the first UK station to be closed on a planned basis. On 28 March 2002, Robin Neville, 10th Baron Braybrooke, Lord Lieutenant of Essex, unveiled a plaque to mark the cessation of electricity generation and the beginning of the decommissioning stage. Decommissioning is being carried out by Nuclear Decommissioning Authority (NDA) subsidiary Nuclear Restoration Services, formerly Magnox Ltd. All spent nuclear fuel was removed from the site by 2005, the turbine hall was demolished in 2011, and by 2016 underground waste storage vaults had been emptied and decontaminated.

Demolition of all buildings except the ponds and two reactor buildings was completed in 2019. Demolition of the reactor buildings and final site clearance is planned for 2083 to 2093.

== Future plans ==
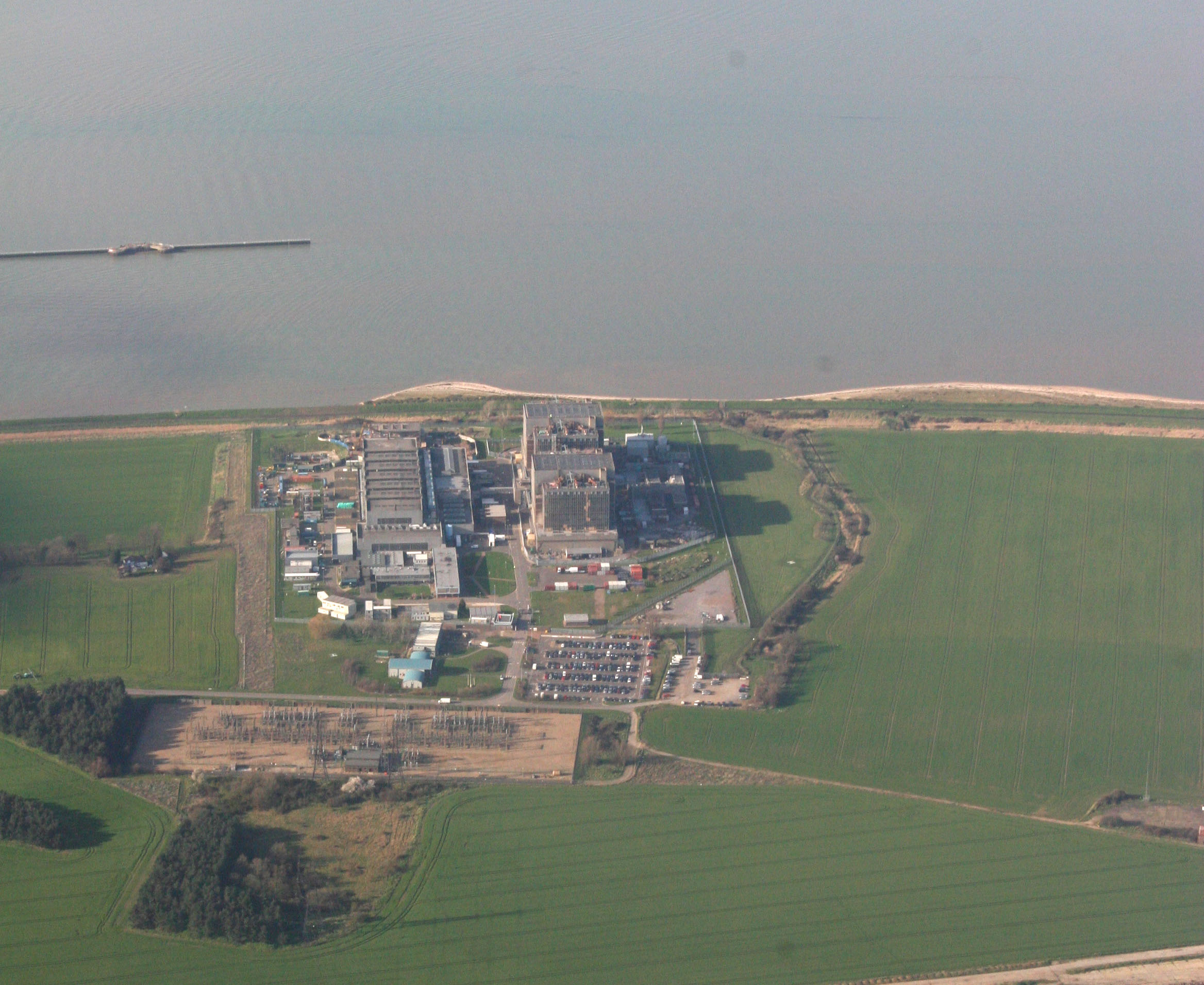
Aerial view of the power station in 2007

In 2007, Bradwell became one of the sites being considered by British Energy for redevelopment in a new round of nuclear reactors. On 18 October 2010, the British government announced that Bradwell was one of the eight sites it considered suitable for future nuclear power stations.

In 2014, The Sunday Times reported that the state-owned China General Nuclear Power Group and China National Nuclear Corporation were preparing preliminary designs for a 3 GW nuclear power station at Bradwell to submit to the Office for Nuclear Regulation.

On 21 September 2015, Energy Secretary Amber Rudd announced that "China was expected to lead the construction of a Beijing-designed nuclear station at the (Bradwell) Essex site". EDF's chief executive Jean-Bernard Lévy stated that the reactor design under consideration is the Hualong One. On 21 October 2015, it was reported that Britain and China had reached Strategic Investment Agreements for three nuclear power plants, including one at Bradwell.

On 19 January 2017, the Office for Nuclear Regulation started their Generic Design Assessment process for the Hualong One design, expected to be completed in 2021, in advance of possible deployment at Bradwell. The target commercial operation date is about 2030.

The press have raised concerns about Chinese government involvement in the project. The China General Nuclear Power Group, specified as a designer and operator of the plant, is blacklisted by the United States Department of Commerce for attempting to acquire advanced U.S. nuclear technology and material for diversion to military use.

== Safety record ==
In 1966, 20 natural uranium fuel rods were stolen from Bradwell. The rods were stolen for their perceived scrap value by Harold Arthur Sneath, a worker at the plant. The theft was discovered by the local police when a van driven by Dennis Patrick Hadley, who was transporting the rods to their final destination, was stopped because of its defective steering. The rods were recovered and, in the subsequent court case, Sneath and Hadley were bound over for five years, each fined £100, and were required to contribute to the costs of the court case. Neither was said to have understood the consequences of the theft.

On 22 January 2011, a fire broke out during the decommissioning work as condenser tubes made from titanium were being cut up. No radiation was released from this fire.

== In literature ==
The construction of the original power station is the subject of the Michael Morpurgo story Homecoming.

== See also ==
- Nuclear power in the United Kingdom
- Energy policy of the United Kingdom
- List of nuclear reactors
- Proposed nuclear power stations in the United Kingdom
