= Anthorn Radio Station =

Radio station transmitting the UK time signal

Anthorn
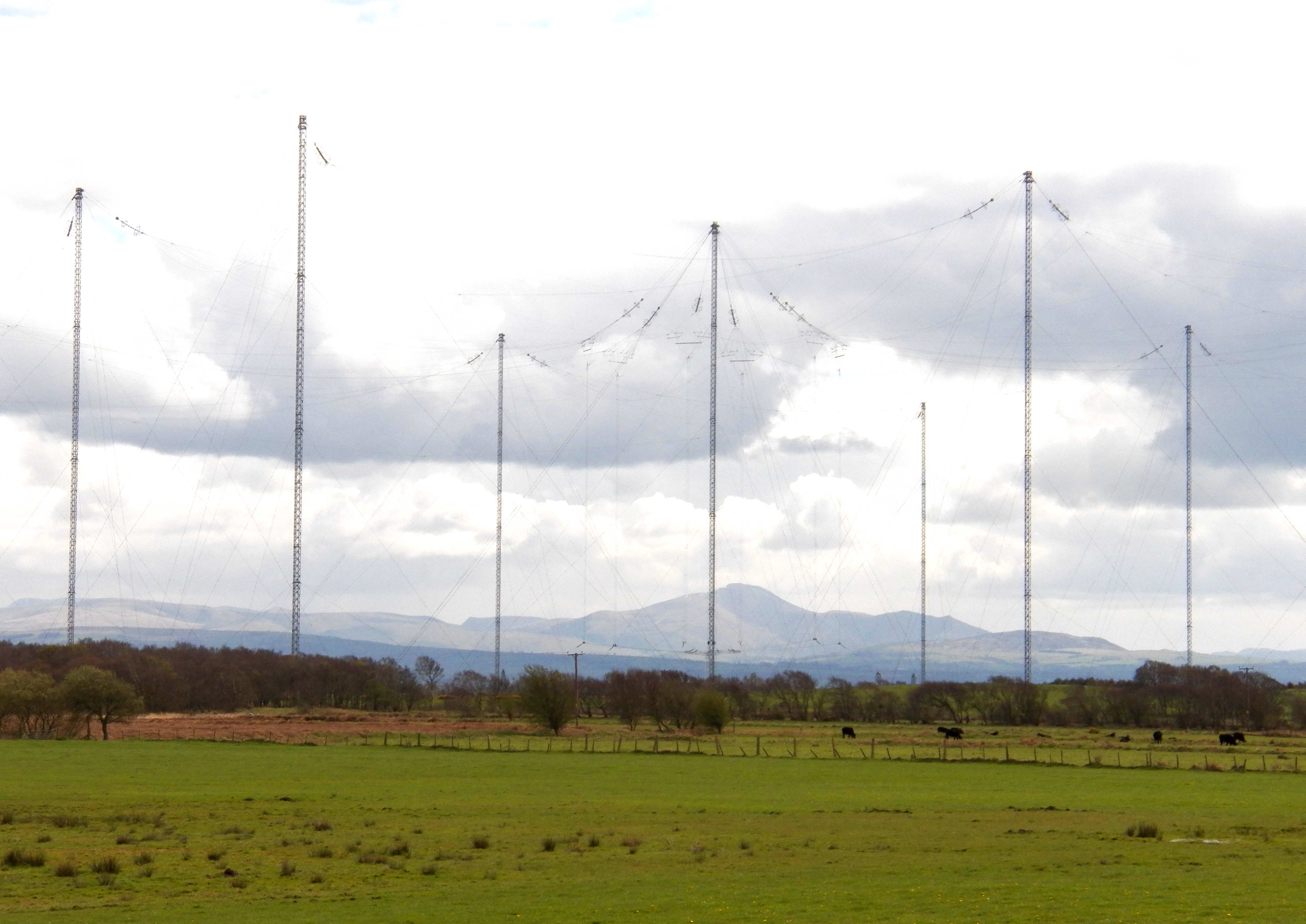

- Location within Cumbria
- Location: Anthorn, Cumbria
- Mast height: 227 metres (745 ft)
- Coordinates: 54.911°N 3.280°W
- Grid reference: NY179581

RNAS Anthorn HMS Nuthatch
- Anthorn, Cumbria in England

Site information
- Type: Royal Naval Air Station
- Owner: Admiralty
- Operator: Royal Navy
- Controlled by: Fleet Air Arm
- Condition: Disused

Location
- Shown within Cumbria RNAS Anthorn (the United Kingdom)
- Coordinates: 54°54′38″N 003°16′47″W

Site history
- Built: 1942
- In use: 1943 - 1958
- Fate: Housing / Military aerial site
- Battles/wars: European theatre of World War II

Airfield information
- Elevation: 30 feet (9 m) AMSL
Runways
Direction	Length and surface
03/21	1,200 yards (1,097 m) x 30 yards (27 m) Asphalt concrete
09/27	1,400 metres (4,593 ft) x 300 yards (274 m) Asphalt concrete
15/33	1,200 metres (3,937 ft) x 30 yards (27 m) Asphalt concrete
- The Military Airfields of Britain: Northern England

Anthorn Radio Station is a naval and government radio transmitting station located near Anthorn, Cumbria, England, overlooking the Solway Firth, and is operated by Babcock International (with whom former operators VT Communications are now merged). It has three transmitters: one VLF, one LF, and an eLoran transmitter.

It is on the site of the Royal Navy's Second World War military airbase, commissioned as HMS Nuthatch and which was operated by the Fleet Air Arm.

== RNAS Anthorn ==
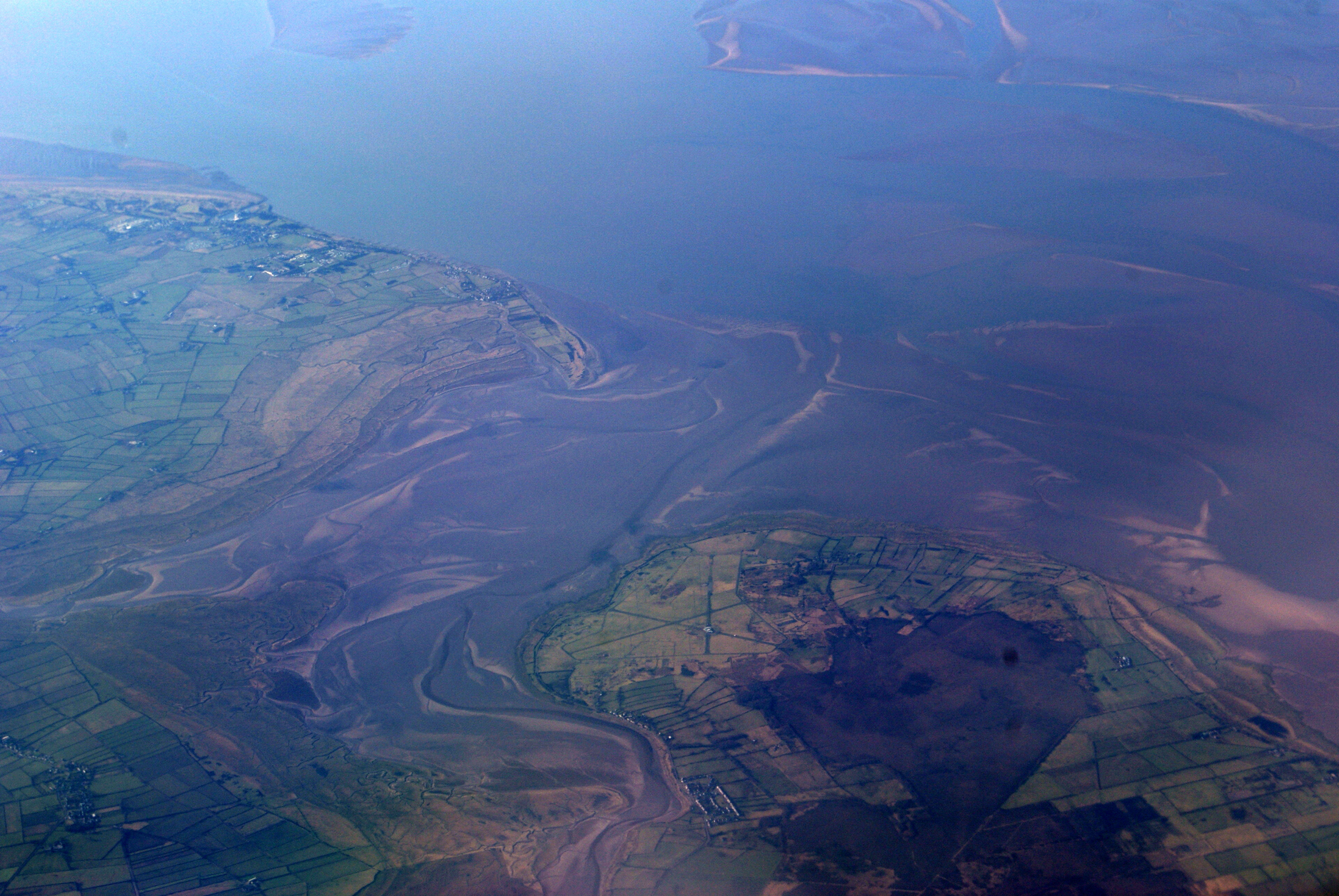
Former RNAS Anthorn, and Anthorn radio station from the air

John Laing & Son began building an airfield at Anthorn for the Fleet Air Arm in late 1943, and Royal Naval Air Station, Anthorn, was commissioned as HMS Nuthatch on 7 September 1944, with three tarmacadam runways. It was the base of No. 1 Aircraft Receipt and Despatch Unit (No. 1 ARDU), which had the job of receiving aircraft fresh from manufacturers, modifying them to Service standards and despatching them to operational squadrons, with the unit specialising in the Vought F4U Corsair, Supermarine Seafire, Fairey Barracuda and Fairey Firefly types. No. 1 ARDU continued to operate from Anthorn following the end of the Second World War, while a number of Fleet Air Arm Squadrons were also based at the airfield in the immediate post war years. The airbase shut down in March 1958. The present road to Cardurnock runs partially along the airfield perimeter track. Several firing butts, for synchronising aircraft machine guns, can still be seen on the seaward side of the road.

Operational units
Unit	Equipment	From	To	Notes
No. 1 ARDU	-	7 September 1944	November 1957	
772 Naval Air Squadron	Various	3 May 1946	26 June 1947	
802 Naval Air Squadron	de Havilland Sea Hornet	May 1948	October 1948	
813 Naval Air Squadron	Blackburn Firebrand	21 May 1948	23 October 1948	
801 Naval Air Squadron	Hawker Sea Fury	6 October 1949	31 October 1949	
812 Naval Air Squadron	Fairey Firefly	4 June 1952	3 July 1952	
807 Naval Air Squadron	Hawker Sea Hawk	14 January 1954	5 May 1954	
860 Naval Air Squadron (Netherlands Naval Aviation Service)	Hawker Sea Hawk	1956		
824 Naval Air Squadron				

== VLF transmitter ==
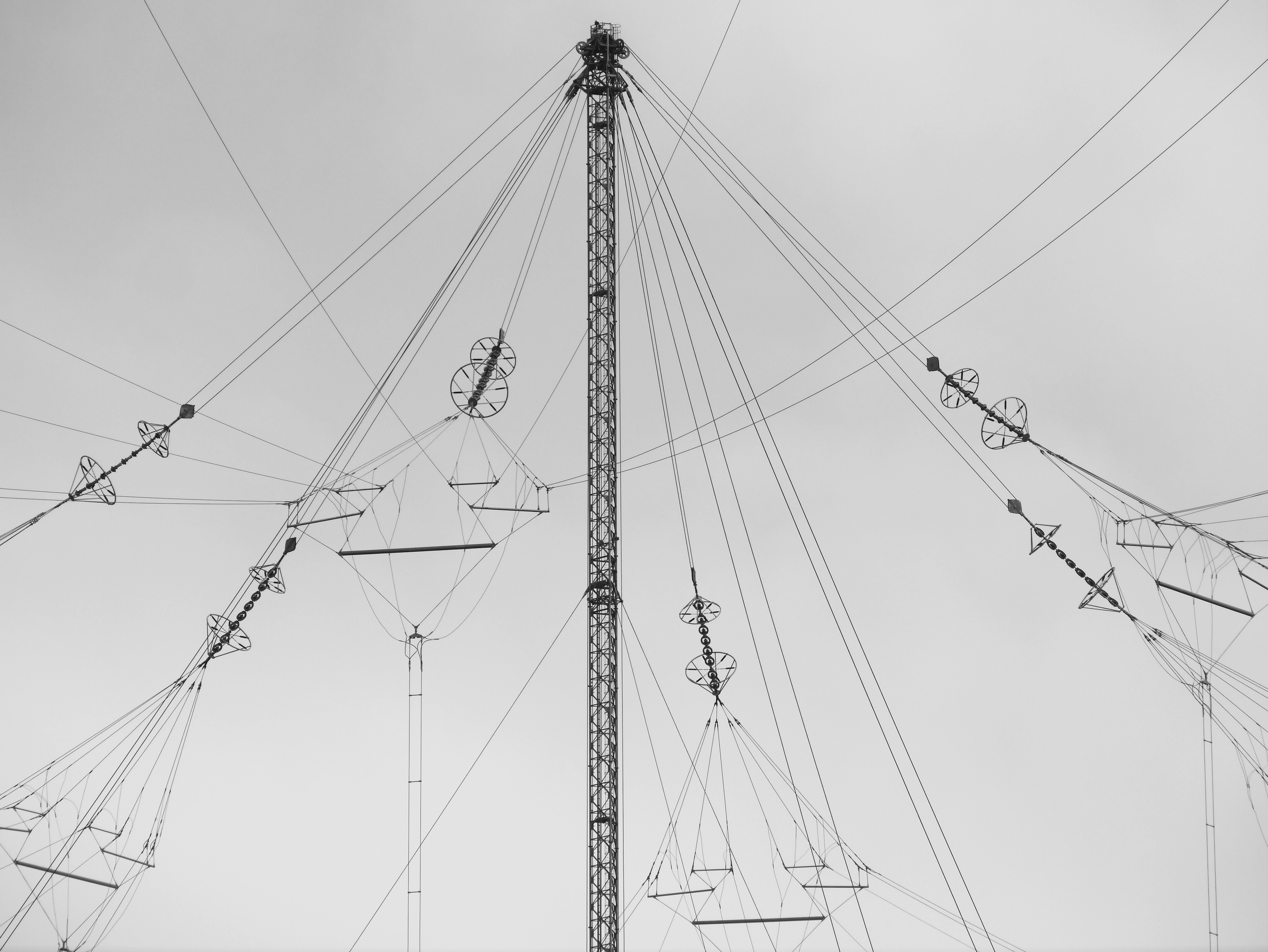
Central mast of the VLF umbrella antenna, showing insulator strings attaching the six toploads to it

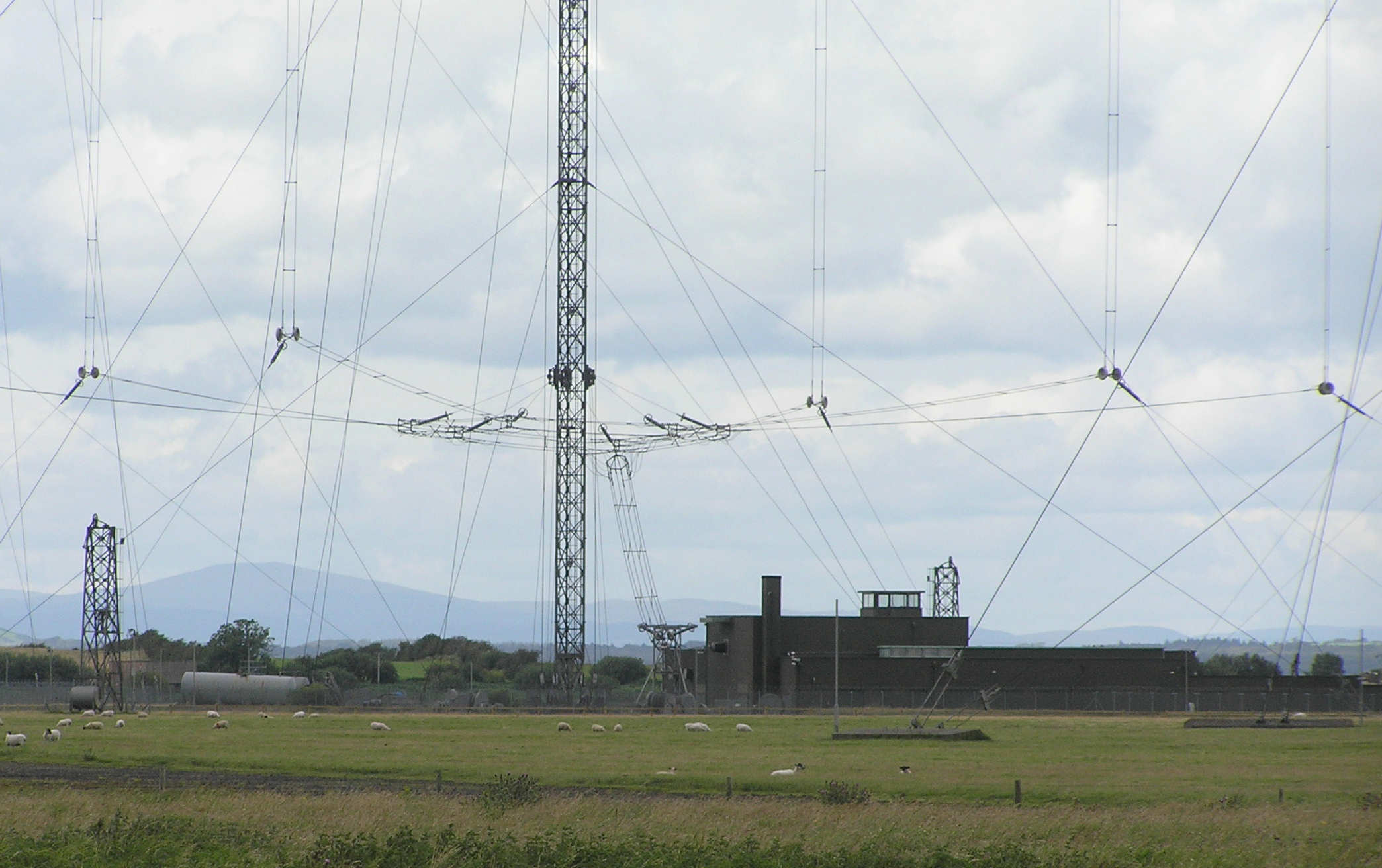
Bottom feeders are used on the main umbrella antenna, as the central lattice mast is not insulated from ground.

The VLF transmitter is used primarily for orders to submarines, and transmits on 19.6 kHz with an output power of 550 kilowatts. Its callsign is GQD. VLF transmissions are relatively unaffected by atmospheric nuclear explosions, and Anthorn was once part of the link between Fylingdales early warning radar, North Yorkshire, and the United States' air defence system.

A large part of the site is taken up by the VLF transmitter's large trideco wire umbrella antenna. This consists of a 748-foot (228 m) central mast with six vertical wire radiators suspended from its top, fed at the base of the mast, attached to six rhombic 2,148-foot (655 m) horizontal multiwire toploads radiating from the central mast at angles of 60° and supported by twelve surrounding masts; this arrangement gives the antenna the shape of a 6-pointed star when seen from above. The cables supporting the endpoints of the wire antenna carry a load of 31 tons, and are attached to computer controlled winches which automatically adjust their tension. The topload wires carry several hundred kilovolts during transmission, requiring long strings of insulators where they attach to the towers.

The Anthorn station is a NATO facility, controlled from Northwood Headquarters along with three other VLF transmitters in Norway, Germany and Italy. In accordance with NATO procedure, the project was the subject of a competition among the organisation's member countries. The British Post Office, acting as technical adviser and agent of the Ministry of Defence, chose the site, negotiated the contract and supervised the work, with the assistance of the Ministry of Public Building and Works. The contract was placed on 26 October 1961 with Continental Electronics Systems Incorporated of Dallas, Texas. This firm had already built a similar but much larger station in Maine, USA. Work began in 1962 and the station was accepted on behalf of the MoD in November 1964.

Originally, the station was designed to radiate a single telegraph channel at up to 45.5 baud and at powers ranging from 50 kW at 16 kHz to 100 kW at 20 kHz. The carrier frequency was to be stable to one part in 10^{8} over a month. Subsequently, the data rate was increased to 50 baud and the carrier stability improved.

== LF transmitter: National Physical Laboratory time signal ==
The National Physical Laboratory (NPL) installed three atomic clocks at Anthorn, and on 27 February 2007 Britain's national time signal transmissions, retaining their original call sign of MSF, were transferred there on a trial basis; the transfer was formalized on 1 April 2007. (The previous transmitter was at Rugby, and administered by BT.) The data transmitted includes time and date information which can be decoded using readily available software, and the signals are transmitted at an accurate frequency of 60 kHz to provide a national frequency standard. The transmitting aerial uses an auxiliary mast adjacent to the VLF array.

Monitoring and logging of the clocks and control of the transmissions is by Internet link from the NPL offices at Teddington in west London, using comparison with GPS signals at both locations. Signal monitoring is by radio. To ensure accuracy, dynamic adjustment of the aerial according to local conditions (such as wind distortion) is controlled from computers on site. The effective radiated power is 17 kW.

== LORAN ==
In 2007, the general lighthouse authorities for Britain and Ireland contracted VT Communications to develop an eLoran (enhanced LORAN) radio navigational aid for mariners; the transmitter is at Anthorn, and uses an auxiliary mast adjacent to the VLF array. Due to the closure of eLoran services in Germany and Norway, the eLoran service at Anthorn was discontinued on 31 December 2015. However, the eLoran timing signal is still active to allow for research and support.

== See also ==
- Rugby radio station

== Sources ==
- Delve, Ken (2006). The Military Airfields of Britain: Northern England: Co. Durham, Cumbria, Isle of Man, Lancashire, Merseyside, Manchester, Northumberland, Tyne & Wear, Yorkshire. Ramsbury, Wiltshire, UK: The Crowood Press. ISBN 1-86126-809-2.
- Ritchie, Berry (1997). The Good Builder: The John Laing Story. James & James.
- Smith, David J. (1981). Action Stations: 3: Military airfields of Wales and the North-West. Cambridge, UK: Patrick Stephens. ISBN 0-85059-485-5.
