= Strachan & Henshaw =

British engineering company

- Company type: Public
- Industry: Engineering
- Founded: 1879
- Defunct: 2008
- Fate: Acquired
- Successor: Babcock International Group
- Headquarters: Bristol, England

Strachan & Henshaw was a defence and nuclear engineering company based in Ashton Gate in Bristol, England.

== History ==
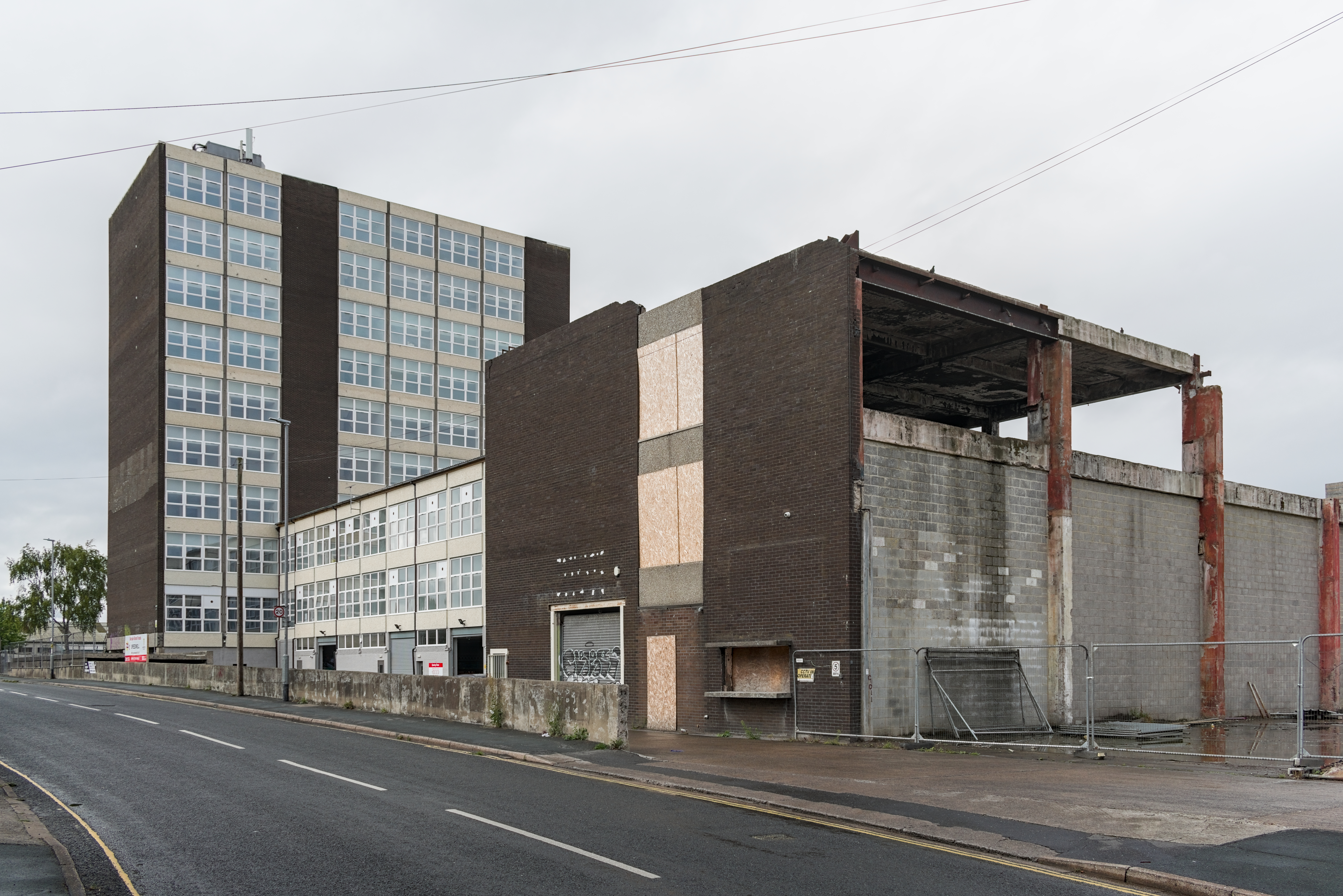
The former Strachan Henshaw Machinery complex in Speedwell, Bristol. It has since been used by a number of small businesses. A major fire occurred in the complex in May 2019, subsequently leading to partial demolition of the site.

The company was founded by Robert Price Strachan and George Henshaw in 1879 as a partnership specialising in the manufacture of paper-bag making machinery, operating from Lewin's Mead in Bristol. In 1920 the business was bought by E. S. & A. Robinson.

In the 1950s, as part of a consortium involving Clarke Chapman, Head Wrightson, C. A. Parsons & Co., A. Reyrolle & Co. and Whessoe and known as the Nuclear Power Plant Company ('NPPC'), it was awarded a contract for reactor mechanical plant at Oldbury nuclear power station. It was subsequently awarded similar contracts at Heysham 2, Hinkley Point B, Hunterston B and Torness nuclear power stations.

In 1966 the company's owners, E.S. & A. Robinson Ltd, merged with John Dickinson Ltd to form Dickinson Robinson Group.

In 1972 the company became the prime contractor for launch systems for the Trafalgar-class submarine fleet. Then in 1989 Roland Franklin of Pembridge Associates acquired Dickinson Robinson Group and went on to sell Strachan & Henshaw to Weir Group in July 1990.

In April 1998, it bought Bridgetest Holdings Ltd, a Manchester-based engineering company whose subsidiaries included Cunnington & Cooper Ltd, Nuclear and General Engineering Ltd and Wingrove & Rogers, all well-established businesses in the UK nuclear industry. Then in May 2000 the company sold its materials handling equipment division to Sweden's Svedala.

The business was acquired by Babcock International Group for £65 million in April 2008; it was subsequently fully integrated into Babcock and the Strachan & Henshaw name is no longer used.
