= Babcock International =

British aerospace and defence company

Babcock International Group plc
- Formerly: Flowplus Public Limited Company (February–June 1989)
- Type: Public limited company
- Traded as: LSE: BAB; FTSE 100 component
- ISIN: GB0009697037
- Industry: Aerospace and defence
- Founded: 1891; 135 years ago
- Founder: George Herman Babcock
- Headquarters: London, England, UK
- Area served: Worldwide
- Key people: Ruth Cairnie (Chairwoman); Harry Holt (CEO)
- Revenue: ▲£5,177.7 million (2026)
- Operating income: ▼£305.1 million (2026)
- Net income: ▼£210.7 million (2026)
- Number of employees: 27,700 (2026)
- Subsidiaries: Cavendish Nuclear; Babcock Mission Critical Services Onshore; Babcock Integrated Technology Ltd; Babcock Canada; Babcock Mission Critical Services (Australia); Babcock Marine; Babcock Education
- Website: babcockinternational.com

Babcock International Group plc is a British aerospace, defence and nuclear engineering services company based in London, England. It specialises in managing complex assets and infrastructure. Although the company has civil contracts, its main business is with public bodies, particularly the United Kingdom's Ministry of Defence and Network Rail. The company has four operating sectors, with overseas operations based in Africa, North America, South America, Europe and Australasia.

Babcock is listed on the London Stock Exchange, and is a constituent of the FTSE 100 Index.

== History ==
=== 1891–1979 ===
Babcock International traces its history back to the 19th century and the American heavy industrial manufacturers Babcock & Wilcox Company, which had been founded in 1867 by partners Stephen Wilcox and George Babcock to manufacture and market Wilcox's patented water-tube boiler. During the 1870s and 1880s, the company, having decided to expand internationally, developed an initial footprint in the British market, centring on cities such as Glasgow, Scotland. On 9 April 1891, Babcock & Wilcox chose to establish a separately financed (capitalised at £250,000 initially) British company, called Babcock & Wilcox Ltd. The initial board members of the British company included the renowned Scottish structural engineer Sir William Arrol and Andrew Stewart, of the Lanarkshire-based steel tube makers A & J Stewart & Menzies, subsequently Stewarts & Lloyds.

Following its establishment, the British company's sphere of operation was defined as 'the world except for North America and Cuba', which was the preserve of the US Babcock & Wilcox venture. Starting in 1885, B&W's steam boilers were manufactured in the Singer Manufacturing Company's Kilbowie Works at Clydebank near Glasgow. Around this time, the inventor and businessman Isaac Singer was a significant and influential shareholder in the business.

During 1895, Babcock & Wilcox Ltd opened a new boilermaking works, based on the 33-acre (130,000 m^{2}) site of the Porterfield Forge on the opposite side of the River Clyde near Renfrew. In 1900, the company secured £1.57 million of investment, which was used to finance the expansion of its global presence via numerous overseas subsidiary ventures. During 1913, B&W began its involvement with the Rosyth Dockyard after winning a bid to construct a steam generation plant on the site; this presence served as a starting point for the firm's subsequent extensive involvement in the ship repair sector.

During both the First World War and Second World War, B&W was a major supplier to Britain's defence establishment. During the 1940s, the workforce at Renfrew peaked at approximately 10,000. In the post-war era, the manufacture and support of defence equipment continued to be a long-running and key business area of the company.

Throughout the 20th century, B&W was a major supplier of boilers for power stations. During the 1960s, the company became involved in the development of civil nuclear power stations in the United Kingdom. B&W also continued to diversify internationally, including into the North American market; by 1979, the company's North American subsidiary was being attributed for generating one-third of total sales (£844 million) and more than half of the business's overall profits. That same year, Babcock & Wilcox Ltd was renamed Babcock International Ltd.

=== 1980–1999 ===
During 1982, Babcock International was floated on the London Stock Exchange, becoming Babcock International PLC. Around this time, subsidiary company Babcock & Wilcox (Operations) Ltd was rebranded Babcock Power Ltd; this division has subsequently become Babcock Energy Ltd. By 1985, Babcock International's turnover had reached £1.1 billion; its subsidiaries were engaged in ventures and projects across the world, typically focusing on its contracting activities. Its materials-handling business, which had been unprofitable since the 1970s, was subject to restructuring efforts and job losses around this period.

During 1987, Babcock merged with rival engineering company FKI Electricals plc, forming FKI Babcock PLC. Shortly thereafter, the newly merged company's head office in London and more than two-dozen plants were closed, causing the loss of around 6,000 jobs, over half of these based in Britain, reducing its workforce to less than 30,000. Several engineering and transport businesses were purchased during this period. During August 1989, FKI Babcock PLC demerged to form Babcock International Group PLC and FKI plc.

The newly independent Babcock International soon engaged in several acquisitions. In April 1992, the firm bought Middle Eastern energy industry contractor King Wilkinson. That same year, the Swedish ship-to-shore handling business Consilium was also acquired. During 1994, Babcock acquired British conglomerate Thorn EMI's 35 per cent stake in the Rosyth Dockyard, resulting in the creation of Babcock Rosyth Defence. In the same year, Babcock's material handling business, centred in Germany, was reorganised and rebranded as Babcock Materials Handling.

Following the recording of a £42 million loss for the business in 1994, which was largely attributed to its energy division and repercussions from a contract at Drax Power Station, Babcock International responded by strategically avoiding overly-large contracts, unless the associated risk was being shared with other partners. Furthermore, the business decided that it would dispose of its more risky business venture altogether. Amongst other changes, Babcock International's works at Rosyth was heavily impacted, being redirected towards the civil sector, such as the oil industry. During late 1996, Babcock purchased Rosyth from the Ministry of Defence at a net cost of £21m.

During 1995, a 75% stake in the boiler manufacturing and energy services activities (originally the core businesses of Babcock), by then known as Babcock Energy Ltd, were sold to Mitsui Engineering & Shipbuilding of Japan, and became Mitsui Babcock Energy Ltd. In November 2006, Mitsui sold the company to Doosan Heavy Industries & Construction, a subsidiary company of the Doosan Group of South Korea: at that time the company was renamed Doosan Babcock Energy Ltd. In September 2009, the Czech-based steam turbine manufacturer, Skoda Power, became part of Doosan Babcock Energy Ltd; this venture was subsequently rebranded Doosan Power Systems Ltd in 2010.

=== 2000–2010 ===
In 2000, Babcock took the strategic decision to move away from manufacturing towards maintaining and supporting the critical equipment and infrastructure of customers. Reflecting the successful shift in the company's strategic focus, in 2002 Babcock was duly reclassified on the London Stock Exchange from 'Engineering' to 'Support Services'.

On 19 June 2002, the company acquired Service Group International Ltd, a provider of support services in defence and civil markets. It successfully bid for Peterhouse Group plc, and on 18 June 2004, its bid was declared unconditional as over 50% of shares were held. On 30 September 2004, it acquired Turner and Partners, a provider of professional services to the telecoms industry.

On 9 May 2006, it went on to acquire Alstec Group Ltd, a nuclear and airport services operator, and on 13 June 2006, it bought the high voltage power lines and mobile telecoms business of ABB South Africa (Pty). On 10 May 2007, 19 million new shares were placed to fund acquisitions, and on 28 June 2007, it acquired Devonport Management Limited, operators of the Devonport Dockyard nuclear submarine and surface vessel facilities and Appledore Shipbuilders.

On 25 July 2007, the United Kingdom Government announced that the Aircraft Carrier Alliance, of which Babcock International is a part, would carry out final assembly of two new aircraft carriers for the Royal Navy at their Rosyth Dockyard. On 7 August 2007, acceptances for the acquisition of International Nuclear Solutions PLC reached 58.9% of issued share capital, and a takeover was then completed.

On 22 April 2008, to further strengthen the brand in the nuclear sector and submarine support sector, Babcock acquired Strachan & Henshaw from the Weir Group for £65m; at the time of the transaction, the company had over 50 years of experience in high integrity material handling. In September 2009, Babcock acquired the UK Atomic Energy Authority's commercial arm, UKAEA Ltd; this acquisition extended Babcock's existing nuclear skills, bringing additional expertise in waste categorisation, decommissioning of high hazard facilities, encapsulation and storage of hazardous materials and transportation of waste. The deal also provided Babcock with its first operational Tier 1 position in the civil nuclear market and a direct relationship with the Nuclear Decommissioning Authority, complementing its existing Tier 1 position in the military nuclear market.

=== 2010–present ===
In March 2010, Babcock acquired VT Group for £1.32bn or 750p a share; the firm offered 361.6p per share in cash, as well as 0.7 new Babcock shares for each VT Group share. The acquisition, which was completed on 8 July 2010, created a combined defence and support services group that annually accrued sales of £3bn and had more than 25,000 employees, which were mainly based in Britain and the United States. As a result of the merger, Babcock took over the contract to operate the Defence High Frequency Communications Service on behalf of the Ministry of Defence; this contract was originally awarded to VT Merlin Communications in 2003, for a period of 15 years.

During March 2014, it was announced that Babcock had agreed to wholly acquire Avincis Group, including its subsidiary Bond Aviation Group, in exchange for £1.6 billion. The former Avincis units was subsequently rebranded under the Babcock name in January 2015. In July 2013, Babcock's Support Services division acquired Conbras Serviços Técnicos de Suporte LTDA in Brazil for a cash consideration of £18.2 million plus deferred consideration of £4.4 million.

In April 2014, Babcock Dounreay Partnership (BDP), a consortium of Babcock International Group PLC (50%), CH2M Hill (30%) and URS (20%) was selected as preferred bidder and eventually awarded a £1.6bn contract by the Nuclear Decommissioning Authority for the management and decommissioning of the Dounreay nuclear site in Scotland. In November 2014, Babcock was named as the British Government's preferred buyer of the land repair and maintenance business of the Defence Support Group, an executive agency and trading fund of the Ministry of Defence. The sale and transfer to Babcock was completed on 1 April 2015.

Throughout the 2010s, the company secured numerous naval contracts. In May 2012, Babcock was awarded a £15m contract by the Ministry of Defence to support the design of the United Kingdom's next generation nuclear-armed submarines. In August 2014, Babcock issued a statement declaring that there would be job losses at HMNB Clyde if Scotland were to vote in favour of independence in the 2014 Referendum. In October 2014, both Babcock and BAE Systems won contracts from the Ministry of Defence worth a total of £3.2 billion to maintain British warships, submarines and naval bases for the following five years.

In December 2014, the Ministry of Defence alienated the non-aerospace assets of the Defence Support Group to Babcock.

In September 2019, it was announced that Babcock had been selected as the preferred bidder to build the new fleet of five Type 31 frigates for the Royal Navy.

During 2018 and 2019, Babcock rebuffed multiple unsolicited advances by public services provider Serco to merge the two businesses together. Merger proposals had been unanimously rejected by Babcock's board, having reportedly found the proposal to lack strategic merit. Reportedly, Rupert Soames, Serco's Chief Executive, remained interested in aligning his company's defence operations with Babcock's own divisions.

At multiple occasions in 2019 and early 2020, Babcock issued profit warnings, which the firm attributed to a downturn in government orders and issues with its aviation division, necessitating a £85m writedown on leases for its North Sea helicopter fleet. During February 2020, it was reported that the company was considering exiting the off-shore helicopter sector amid intense competition; Babcock had already reduced its Sikorsky S-92 and Eurocopter EC225 Super Puma fleets from 15 to seven helicopters and 13 to one helicopters respectively. The firm's decision to downsize its S-92 inventory caused manufacturer Sikorsky to sue Babcock over its refusal to accept delivery of units ordered in 2011.

In April 2021, as part of a wide-ranging restructuring program, Babcock announced that it would be selling off a number of its business lines, resulting in 1,000 job losses (850 of which would be in the United Kingdom); as part of this, the firm will sell its oil and gas aviation transport arm to CHC Group. The company also confirmed the disposal of its helicopter support business in July 2022.

In March 2023 Babcock International sold the emergency aviation businesses in Finland, Italy, Norway, Portugal, Spain and Sweden to UK group Alacala Partners which re-formed them into the Avincis Group.

== Controversy ==
=== Glue repairs on nuclear reactor ===
In February 2023, the British Royal Navy ordered an investigation into the repairs made by Babcock International engineers on a Trident submarine after it was discovered that glue had been used to fix broken bolts in the nuclear reactor. A navy source told The Guardian newspaper: “It’s a disgrace. You can’t cut corners with nuclear. Standards are standards. Nuclear standards are never compromised.”

== Operations ==
The company is organised into four sectors: Marine, Land, Aviation and Nuclear.

=== Financial information ===
Babcock International Group plc financial results.
Year ended	Revenue (£ million)	Operating Profit (£m)	Profit/(loss) before tax (£m)	Earnings per share (p)
2026	5,177.7	305.1	283.7	42.1
2025	4,831.3	363.9	329.1	49.1
2024	4,390.1	241.6	216.7	32.9
2023	4,438.6	45.5	6.2	(6.9)
2022	4,101.8	226.8	182.3	32.5
2021	3,971.6	(1,736.7)	(1,811.0)	(357.0)
2020	4,449.5	(106.3)	(178.2)	(38.6)
2019	4,474.8	280.3	235.2	39.5
2018	4,659.6	439.1	391.1	66.6
2017	4,547.1	416.3	362.1	61.8
2016	4,158.4	387.1	330.1	57.0
2015	3,996.6	381.7	313.1	52.9
2014	3,321.0	254.0	218.8	44.3
2013	3,029.4	252.5	224.6	53.0
2012	2,848.4	206.3	173.0	42.9
2011	2,564.5	159.3	111.1	30.1
