= Doosan Enerbility =

South Korean heavy industry company

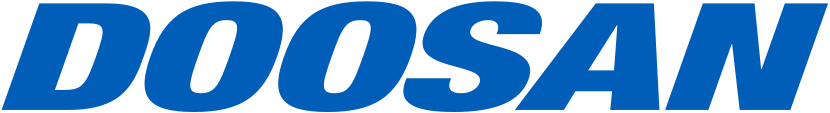
- Type: Public (traded on the Korea Stock Exchange)
- Traded as: KRX: 034020
- Industry: Power plants, Desalination Plants & Construction
- Founded: 1962; 64 years ago
- Headquarters: Changwon, South Korea
- Key people: Park Seohyun (Chairman); Chung Junghwan (Vice Chairman); Choi Geonhee (CEO); Han Key-sun (COO)
- Products: Nuclear power plants, Thermal power plants, Desalination plants, Castings and Forgings to Construction, Reactor vessel, Steam generator, Pressurised heavy water reactor, generators and Steam & Gas turbines of Power Plant
- Revenue: US$ 11.9 billion (2024)
- Number of employees: 7,728
- Subsidiaries: Doosan Power Systems, Doosan IMGB, Doosan Heavy Industries Vietnam, Doosan Vina HaiPhong, Doosan Power Systems India, Doosan HF Controls

Doosan Enerbility Co., Ltd., (a combination of words Energy and Sustainability) formerly known as Doosan Heavy Industries, is a heavy industrial company headquartered in Changwon, South Korea.

It was established in 1962. Its business includes manufacturing and construction of nuclear power plants, thermal power stations, turbines and generators, desalination plants, castings, and forgings.

== History ==
In 1962, Doosan Heavy Industries & Construction Co., Ltd, formerly known as Korea Heavy Industries and Construction Co., Ltd, was founded by Doosan Group. In 1999, Doosan Heavy Industries & Construction was integrated with several other domestic power industries.

In 2000, Doosan Heavy Industries & Construction went public and was listed on the Korean stock market. In 2001, Korea Heavy Industries and Construction Co., Ltd was renamed as Doosan Heavy Industries & Construction Co., Ltd. The company was ranked first in global desalination market and selected as "Global Product".

In 2006, Doosan Heavy Industries and Construction acquired Kvaerner IMGB (Currently Doosan IMGB) and Mitsui Babcock (Currently Doosan Babcock). The company established water R&D centers in Dubai (UAE) and Tampa, Florida (USA). In 2007, Doosan Heavy Industries and Construction began the construction of Doosan VINA plant in Vietnam.

In 2008, Doosan Engineering & Construction signs a contract regarding the supply of nuclear equipment, such as reactor vessels and steam generators, with Westinghouse. The input is for the two AP1000 reactors located in the USA and is worth around $195 million US dollars. In 2009, Doosan Heavy Industries and Construction acquired Czech-based power systems maker Škoda Power. Doosan VINA was completed in 2009. In 2010, Korea Electric Power Company (Kepco) granted Doosan Heavy Industries a $3.9 billion US dollar contract to supply equipment for four nuclear power reactors planned in the United Arab Emirates. In 2011, Doosan Heavy Industries and Construction acquired AE&E Chennai Works (Currently Doosan Power Systems India). In 2012, Doosan Heavy Industries and Construction acquired the assets of Enpure Limited, a water process engineering company in the UK to form Doosan Enpure.

On December 10, 2014, Korea Herald reports that Doosan Engineering & Construction has scrapped original plans to build a 1 trillion won thermal power plant. This halt in building plans hinders the Company's chances of meeting its annual target of winning 10 trillion won worth of construction orders. The reason behind the cancellation of plans by National Thermal Power Corporation Limited (NTPC) was due to the lack of government approvals regarding environmental and other issues. In September, Doosan had bid the lowest price for a Katwa 1,320 megawatt power plant, beating Indian rival Larsen & Toubro.

In December 2014, it signed a contract to build the Nghi Sơn II Power Station in Vietnam, and in April 2015, the Anin Thermoelectric Power Plant in South Korea. In February 2015, it delivered seawater desalination plant facilities for Escondida in Chile. In June and July the company won tenders for water treatment plants in the United Kingdom and Oman. In April 2015, the company delivered a nuclear reactor for the Barakah Nuclear Power Plant in the United Arab Emirates.

In 2016, Doosan Heavy Industries and Construction acquired 1Energy Systems, a Seattle-based company that specializes in ESS control system software, to form Doosan GridTech The company began developing a large gas turbine for power generation (215–299.9 MW) in 2013 and completed development in 2019. The 270 MW model was installed at a Gimpo Combined Heat and Power Plant in 2023 and began commercial operation.
