= Snorkers =

British English colloquialism for sausages

Snorkers is a British English colloquialism for sausages. It may have a Royal Navy slang origin. The term is probably derived from an earlier dialect term for a young pig: Wright's 19th-century English Dialect Dictionary notes snorker as a widespread word for a piglet, related to the word snork, to grunt or snore.

Snorkers is the nickname for Palethorpe's pre-cooked tinned sausages. The nickname originated aboard World War II Royal Navy submarines, along with other terms like "HITS" (tinned herrings in tomato sauce) and "babies' heads" (tinned steak and kidney pudding). Fresh food lasted only a few days aboard submarines so nearly everything was tinned.

Snorkers are mentioned in Nicholas Monsarrat's novel The Cruel Sea as the favourite food of Lieutenant James Bennett, RNVR. Bennett is described as Australian, and the snorkers references attributed to him alone, which suggests a possible antipodean derivation of the word.

Terry Wogan often referred with relish to snorkers, a welcome part of the culinary delights (sometimes) served up for Sir Terry and his "team" on the BBC Radio 2 breakfast show.
