= Maritime Reserve (United Kingdom) =

- Maritime Reserve badge
- Active: 1995–present
- Country: United Kingdom
- Branch: Royal Navy
- Type: Oversee all Maritime Reserves
- Size: Commodore's Command
- Part of: Office of the Second Sea Lord
- Command HQ: HMNB Portsmouth, Portsmouth

Commanders
- Current Commander: Commodore Suzi Nielsen

The Maritime Reserve is a term used to group together the Royal Naval Reserve (RNR) and Royal Marines Reserve (RMR). The RNR and RMR form part of the British Armed Forces Volunteer Reserves.

== History ==
After 1976 and the dissolution of the post of Admiral Commanding, Reserves, responsibility for administering reserves then came under the Commander-in-Chief, Naval Home Command until 1994. From 1994-1996 the Second Sea Lord became responsible for managing reserves. Later that year the new post of Flag Officer, Training and Recruitment took over responsibility for reserves until 2004. In 2005 the Flag Officer Scotland and Northern Ireland became responsible for the Royal Naval Reserve, holding the joint title of Flag Officer, Reserves. In 2015 the Naval Secretary/Assistant Chief of the Naval Staff (Policy) assumed responsibility for reserves and the post was renamed Flag Officer, Maritime Reserves.

As of June 2026, the current head of the Maritime Reserve is Commodore Suzi Nielsen.

== Commander Maritime Reserves ==
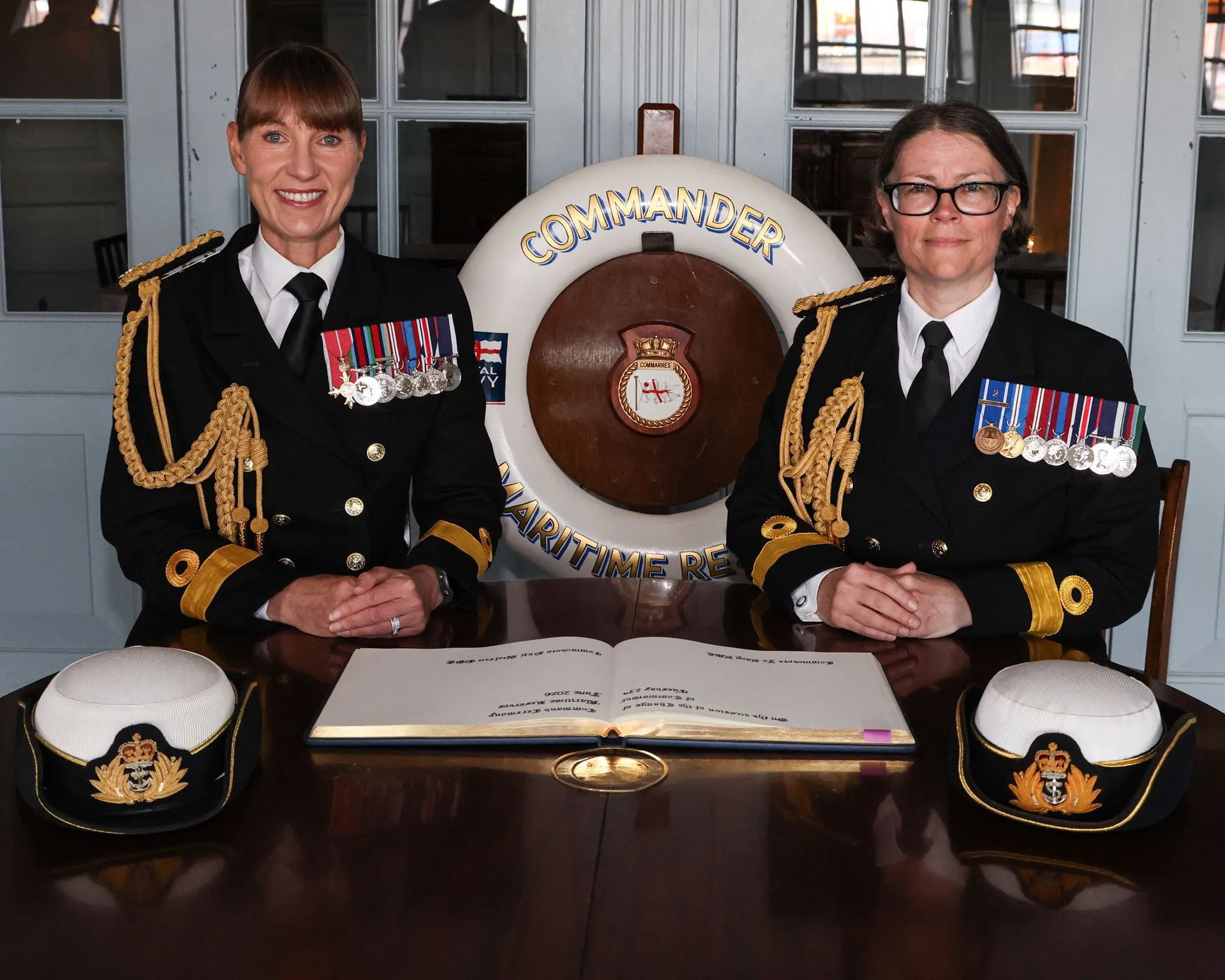
Commodores Suzi Nielsen (left) and Jo Adey (right) at the handover ceremony in 2026 onboard HMS Victory

The head of the Maritime Reserve is Commander Maritime Reserves (COMMARRES) and holds the rank of commodore. The following have served in that role:

- –2012: John Keegan
- 2012–2013: Gareth Derrick
- 2013–2016: Andrew Jameson
- 2016–2020: Martin Quinn
- 2020–2023: Mel Robinson
- 2023–2026: Jo Adey
- 2026–Present: Suzi Nielsen

== See also ==
- Royal Navy
- Royal Marines
- Reserve Forces and Cadets Association
- Volunteer Reserve
- Regular Reserve
- Military reserve force
