= Melanie Robinson =

Naval officer

Commodore Melanie Robinson CBE ADC
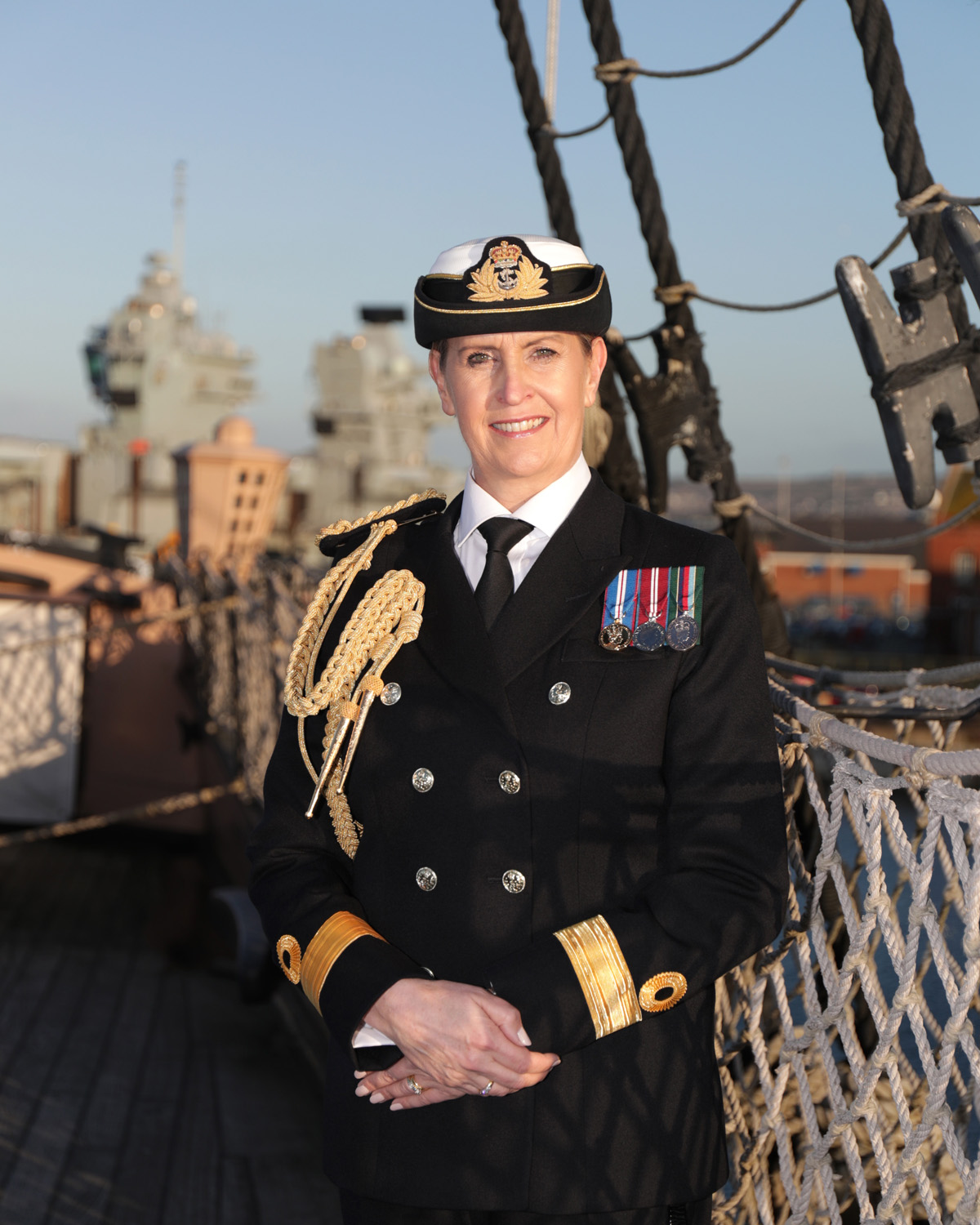
- Commodore Melanie Robinson in February 2020
- Born: Melanie Suzanne Rees
- Alma mater: Cardiff University; Open University
- Spouse: Guy Robinson (m. 1998)
- Military career
- Allegiance: United Kingdom
- Branch: Royal Navy
- Service years: 1993–2023
- Rank: Commodore
- Commands: Maritime Reserve; HMS Express; Wales University Royal Naval Unit
- Awards: Commander of the Order of the British Empire

Commodore Melanie Suzanne Robinson, CBE, ADC is a retired British senior Royal Naval Reserve officer. She was Commander of Maritime Reserves from February 2020 until retirement in July 2023.

== Early life and education ==
Robinson has a degree from Cardiff University. She also has a Master of Science (MSc) degree in human resource management from the Open University.

== Naval career ==
She was commissioned in Supplementary List of the Royal Navy as a sub-lieutenant on 6 January 1993. She was appointed to the Trained Strength on 15 October 1994. Her early career was as a warfare officer, serving in a number of frigates and minor war vessels.

As commander of the Cardiff University Royal Naval Unit (now Wales URNU) and its training ship HMS Express, she was one of the first cohort of women to command a Royal Navy patrol vessel. She transferred to the Royal Naval Reserve with the rank of commander in November 2015. She was promoted to commodore on 4 February 2020, and was then one of four women to hold that rank.

Robinson was appointed a Commander of the Order of the British Empire in the 2022 Birthday Honours.

== Personal life ==
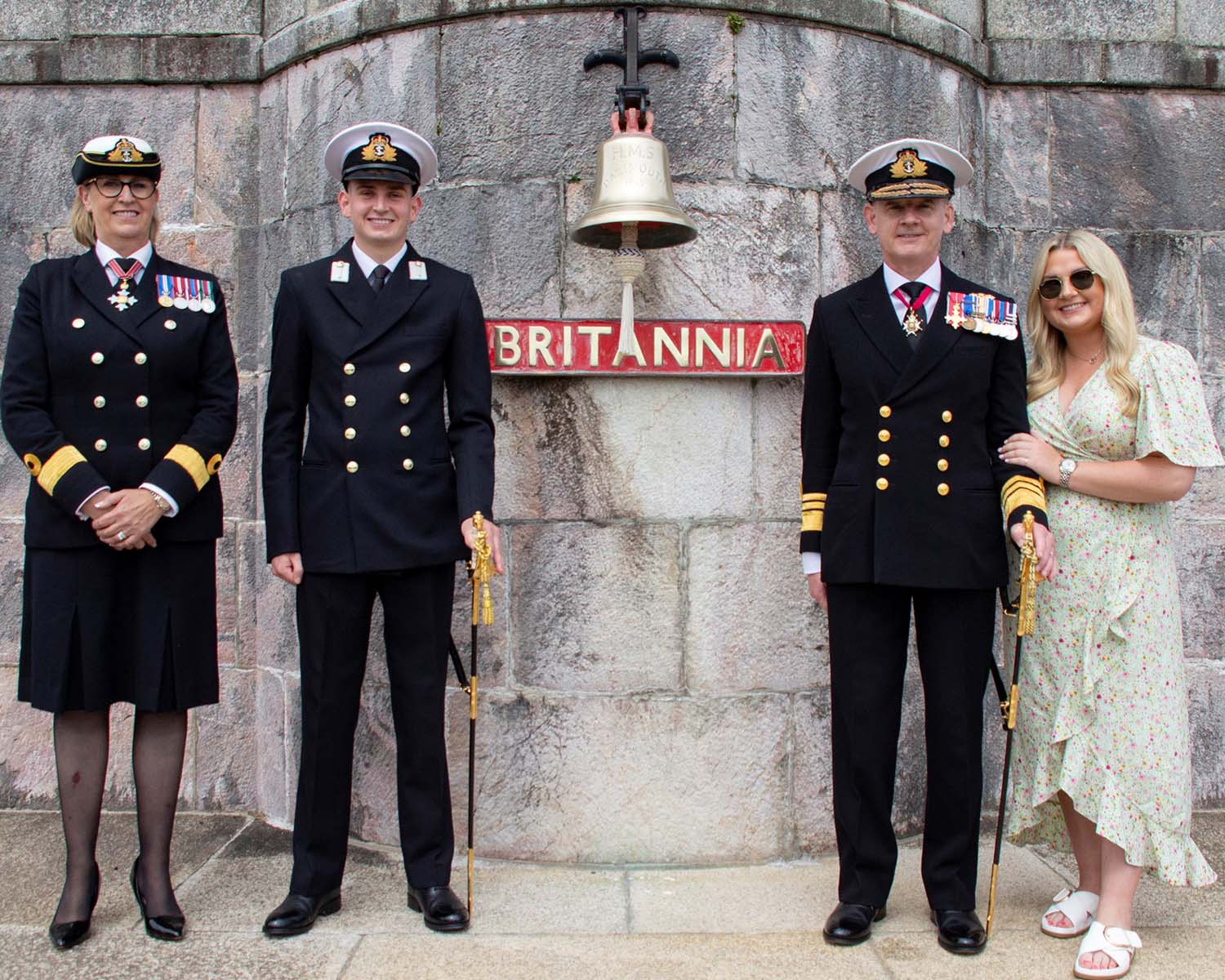
Robinson family in 2023

In 1998, she married Guy Robinson. Vice Admiral Robinson is a fellow retired Royal Navy officer whose last draft was with NATO as Chief of Staff to Supreme Allied Commander Transformation. They have two children.

== See also ==
- List of senior female officers of the British Armed Forces
