= Guy Robinson =

Royal Navy Vice Admiral (born 1967)

Vice Admiral Guy Robinson CB OBE
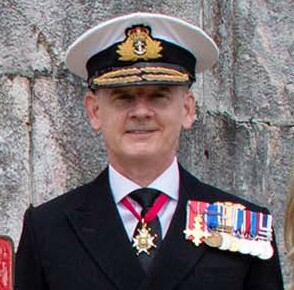
- Robinson in 2023
- Born: 9 April 1967 (age 59)
- Education: King's College London (MA)
- Spouse: Melanie Robinson (m. 1998)
- Military career
- Allegiance: United Kingdom
- Branch: Royal Navy
- Service years: 1986–2024
- Rank: Vice Admiral
- Commands: HMS Daring; HMS Edinburgh; HMS Guernsey
- Conflicts: Iraq War; Gulf War
- Awards: Companion of the Order of the Bath; Officer of the Order of the British Empire; Mentioned in Despatches

Vice Admiral Guy Antony Robinson, CB, OBE (born 9 April 1967) is a retired senior Royal Navy officer. His last posting from September 2021 to late 2024 was as Chief of Staff of NATO Allied Command Transformation.

== Early life and education ==
Robinson was born on 9 April 1967 in Dunfermline, Fife, Scotland. He was educated a Bembridge School, an independent school on the Isle of Wight.

== Naval career ==
Robinson joined the Royal Navy in 1986. He has served as commanding officer of three different ships including the patrol vessel, HMS Guernsey, the destroyer, HMS Edinburgh, and the destroyer, HMS Daring. In 2008, he commanded Task Group 158.1 from the Khawr al Amaya Oil Terminal and ran operations in the Persian Gulf.

Positions held by Robinson include Flag Officer Sea Training staff, Commander Sea Training, and Assistant Chief of Staff (Warfare). In February 2015, he was appointed deputy commander of the United Kingdom Strike Force. He served in that position until April 2021 when Rear Admiral James Morley took over the post.

In July 2021, Robinson was appointed Chief of Staff to Supreme Allied Commander Transformation and was subsequently promoted to the rank of vice admiral. He was placed on the Retired list on 21 December 2024.

== Honours and decorations ==
In 2003, Robinson was Mentioned in Despatches for his services while commanding HMS Edinburgh. In 2013, Robinson was appointed an Officer of the Order of the British Empire in the 2013 Birthday Honours in recognition of his work when he took HMS Daring on the first operational deployment of a Type 45 destroyer to the Persian Gulf.

Robinson was appointed a Companion of the Order of the Bath in the 2023 New Year Honours.

== Personal life ==
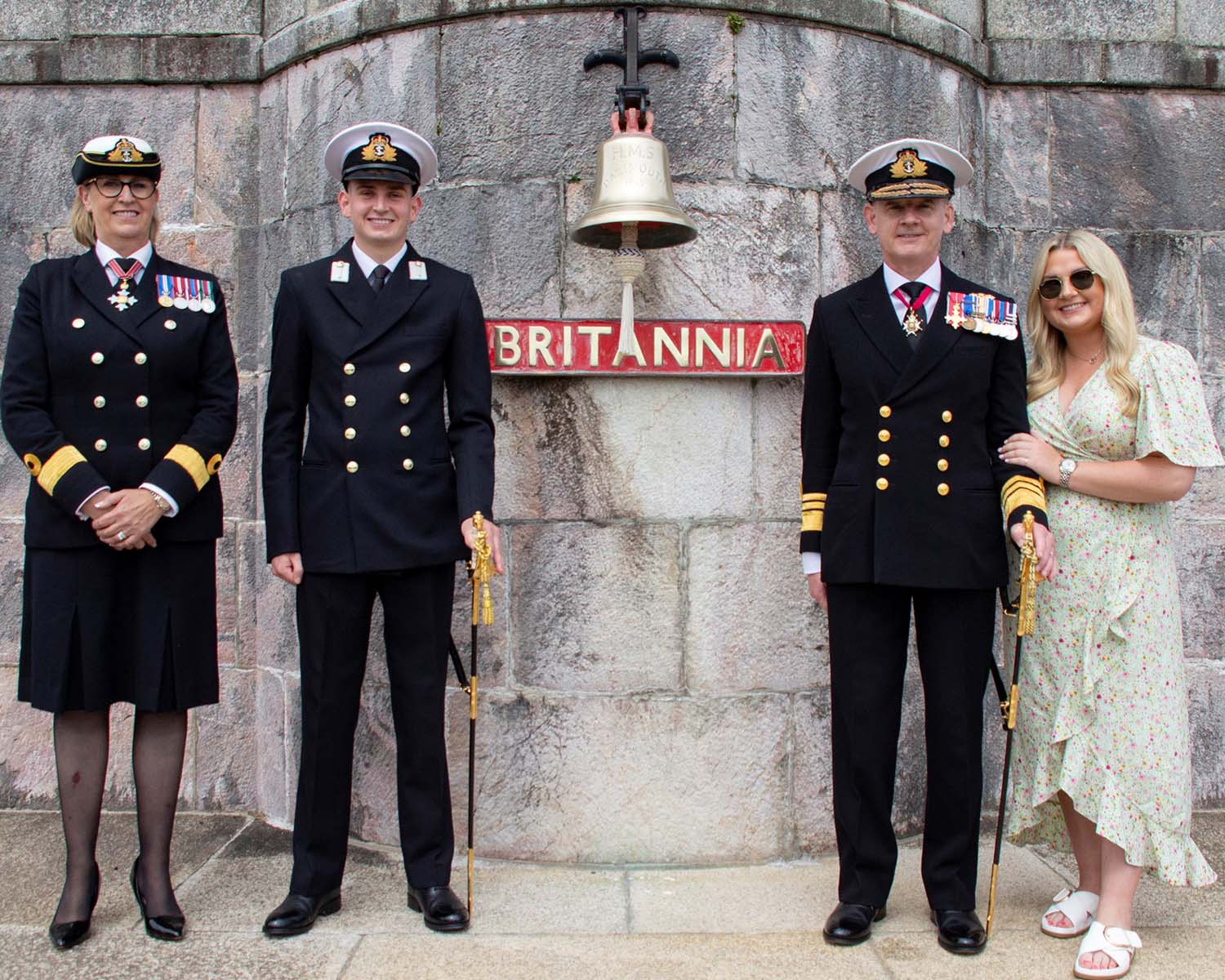
Robinson family in 2023

Robinson lives in Hampshire with his wife, Commodore Melanie Robinson, and their two adult children, Max and Maisie. He is a 2013 graduate of the Higher Command and Staff Course, a 2015 graduate of the US Coalition Force Maritime Component Commanders' Course, and a 2017 graduate of the Royal College of Defence Studies. Also, he is an alumnus of the Windsor Leadership Trust and holds a master's degree in Defence Studies from King's College London.
