= K. W. Monsarrat =

English physician, surgeon, philosopher and writer (1872-1968)

- Born: 11 January 1872; Kendal
- Died: 28 April 1968 (aged 96); Liverpool
- Occupations: Physician, surgeon

Keith Waldegrave Monsarrat (11 January 1872 – 28 April 1968) was an English physician, surgeon, philosopher and writer.

== Biography ==
Monsarrat was born in Kendal. He was educated at King William's College on the Isle of Man. In 1890 he joined the University of Edinburgh as a medical student and graduated with an MB ChB in 1894. He worked at Nottingham General Hospital and Great Yarmouth Hospital. He moved to Liverpool and obtained FRCS in 1897. He married the same year and took up medical practice in Liverpool.

In 1898, he was appointed assistant surgeon to the Cancer Hospital in Liverpool and as assistant surgeon to Liverpool Children's Infirmary a year later. He was made honorary surgeon to David Lewis Northern Hospital, a position he held until his retirement in 1932. He was appointed lecturer in clinical surgery at University of Liverpool in 1907 and dean of the faculty of medicine from 1908 to 1914.

He was a territorial officer and was posted to the 37th General Hospital in Salonika during World War I. He was awarded the Serbian Order of St. Sava. He received the Territorial Decoration in 1920. He returned to his surgical practice in 1927 and was elected to the General Medical Council. He became President of the Liverpool Medical Institution in 1930.

Monsarrat was a member of the British Medical Association. He retired in 1932 at the age of 60 to devote himself to philosophy and writing. He authored numerous books. However his retirement from 1932 was short-lived as he was called upon to organise the wartime services in Liverpool. During World War II he was group officer for the Emergency Medical Service and also carried out committee work at the Ministry of Health in London. He married Mrs Adami in 1947 and finally retired from all committee work.

He was made an honorary life member of the Liverpool Medical Institution in October 1967 as he had attained 70 years of membership. He was a member of The Wayfarers' Club and was its president in 1919.

His son Nicholas Monsarrat was a novelist.

== Selected publications ==
- Surgical Technics in Hospital Practice (1898)
- The Red Halls and Other Verses (1920)
- Health and the Human Spirit (1923)
- Human Understanding and its World (1937)
- Human Powers and their Relations (1938)
- My Self, My Thinking, My Thoughts (1942)
- Thoughts, Deeds and Human Happiness (1946)
- Human Desires and Their Fulfilment (1950)
- On Human Thinking (1955)
- K. W. Monsarrat: A Tribute on the Occasion of His 90th Birthday (1962)
- On Human Wisdom (1964)
