= The Master Mariner, Book 1: Running Proud =

1978 novel by Nicholas Monsarrat

The Master Mariner
- First edition
- Author: Nicholas Monsarrat
- Cover artist: Peter McClure (paperback)
- Language: English
- Genre: Historical fiction
- Set in: Age of Sail
- Publisher: Cassell & Co, London
- Publication date: 1978
- Publication place: United Kingdom
- Pages: 509 (paperback)
- ISBN: 0304296090

The Master Mariner is Nicholas Monsarrat's final work, unfinished at the time of his death, but published in its incomplete form. It is a two-volume historical novel. Based on the legend of the Wandering Jew, it tells the story of Matthew Lawe, an Elizabethan English seaman who, as punishment for an act of cowardice, is doomed to sail the world's seas until the end of time. Lawe is depicted participating in critical moments in history and serving with key figures.

Book One is titled 'Running Proud'.

The book is dedicated to 'by gracious permission, to His Royal Highness the Prince of Wales, sometime sailor, future king'.

== Plot summary ==
Matthew Lawe, a former pupil at Barnstable Poor School who ran away to sea, is first seen as coxswain to Sir Francis Drake on his flagship, Revenge. As the Spanish Armada sails to invade England in 1588, Lawe is ordered to take command of the Thomas, one of several fire ships that will be sent against the Spanish galleons. But Lawe fires the ship earlier than Drake has ordered him to. At a critical moment, Lawe’s courage deserts him and he jumps overboard from the burning ship, leaving Jem, a mortally injured fellow sailor, to his fate. Jem curses Lawe to ‘live forever’.

Lawe is rescued by a galleon, San Virgilio, which fights its way up the North Sea and around the Scottish coast. They send a foraging party ashore at Tobermory on the Isle of Mull, but many of the party are massacred by the locals. They manage to bring back a haggard old woman who claims to be the hereditary witch of the local clan with prophetic powers. With Lawe forced to ‘translate’, the woman, known as Morag, foretells the destruction of the ship. Lawe, learning that he is likely to be burned as a heretic at the insistence of the ship’s fanatical priest, manages to escape onto the Isle of Mull, before the ship does indeed catch fire and explode.

Lawe is next seen in 1610, signing on the Discovery (1602 ship), commanded by Henry Hudson. The ship sails to Canada to discover the fabled Northwest passage, but becomes ice-bound in what is later named Hudson’s Bay. In the Spring, as the ice melts and frees the ship, the crew, depleted, ill and starving, mutiny. They force Hudson and some of the crew into a small boat. Lawe, somewhat reluctantly, is one of those who join the mutiny, and they sail for England.

The action now moves to 1670. Lawe is Mate on the brigantine Cambridge, captained by Henry Morgan, the most feared pirate on the Spanish Main. When Morgan proposes a raid by several ships under his command to take Panama, the despatch point for Spanish treasure galleons, Lawe is one of those who disagrees with Morgan’s grand plan. Falling out with Morgan, he flees Port Royal, Morgan’s home port. He takes service on a small French patache, captained by Simon Montbarre (a character possibly based on the historical Daniel Montbars), who is even more ruthless than Morgan.

They land on a small unnamed island, where they find fresh water and fresh food, then set up lanterns on the palm trees to lure ships to the reef that they may loot them. A Spanish ship duly does founder on the rocks and the crew are captured. Many are killed, many are horribly tortured to death. Finally sick of the slaughter, Lawe contrives to rescue a young girl and they hide inland, knowing that Montbarre will assume them to have taken a longboat out to sea.

They stay safely in their hideout and months pass. They have ample fresh food and gradually learn to communicate in broken English and Spanish. Finally, they make love and the girl falls pregnant. She dies in childbirth, with Matthew unable to help. He allows the child to also die, buries them and gives himself up to visiting Caribs, who take him by boat to Barbados. Here, in a tavern, he meets a fellow sailor from Morgan’s ship, who tells him that both Morgan and Montbarre still seek him. He is advised to put a great distance between the Caribbean and himself.

Fleeing the Caribbean, Lawe takes service on a small African trader, and arrives all but penniless in Portsmouth in 1682. He finds the port full of merrymakers, with free ale to all and sundry. King Charles II, his current Mistress, the Duchess of Portsmouth, the Secretary to the Navy, Samuel Pepys and many other high and mighty people are there to see the launch of a new Royal Yacht, the HMY Fubbs, named after the Duchess (her nickname). Lawe joins the hangers-on and learns that whoever recovers the ship’s golden christening cup that will be thrown into the water can demand a ransom for it. He duly does so, fighting off other swimmers and gallantly presenting the cup to the Duchess. King Charles, impressed, passes around the Lord Mayor’s hat-of-office, which is filled with money. Lawe receives forty golden guineas. He also contrives to speak to Pepys, who explains something of his efforts to professionalise the navy and improve conditions for seamen.

Lawe’s store of money dwindles after much visiting of Portsmouth taverns with his new fair-weather friends, and he ships on a collier, arriving at the Pool of London a year later. By pure chance, through his assistance to a Thames waterman, he again meets Pepys, who has just received a new appointment which gives him wide powers within the Navy. Impressed with Lawe, he takes him in as a clerk, a position that Lawe works hard at, although unaccustomed to office work.

From Pepys, Lawe learns something of London’s recent history which he is unaware of, including the Great Fire of London in 1666 which Pepys witnessed, and the Great Plague of London a year earlier.

Pepys works hard to develop the Navy, to discover and root out corruption and fraud. He strives to improve conditions for mariners. He serves both King Charles and his successor, James ll, but when King William lll comes to the throne in 1688, all official appointments are suspended. Believing that he will not be reappointed under King William, Pepys writes a glowing letter of recommendation for Lawe, and leaves office.

Matthew works on at the Admiralty, but eventually is dismissed. He loses his comfortable home, which he shared with Pepys and the other clerks, and is forced into meaner lodgings. Having made friends with Edward Lloyd, whose coffee-house (Lloyd's Coffee House) has become a gathering place for businessmen and ship-owners, he is given a job there. In 1720, he is swept up in the speculation fever that will lead to the South Sea Bubble, and pays all his hard-earned money to a fly-by-night stockjobber promising an impressive return. Having also borrowed money to buy the non-existent stock, he is left destitute. He is imprisoned for debt in the Fleet Prison.

After six months in prison, he meets Lucy, one-time servant in Pepys’s house, who claims to know a man who may be able to get him released. The anonymous man duly arrives. He is seeking sailors, and offers Lawe a job which he has no option but to take. He must agree to serve for five years on a ship and pay his first two years' wages and bonuses to the agent. The man arranges, by bribery, for Lawe to walk out of prison; he is now a fugitive debtor and effectively an outlaw. He is spirited away to Bristol, where he joins the ship.

He finds himself doing backbreaking, filthy and highly dangerous work with a motley crew on the longboat of Consuela, a Portuguese ship fishing for cod on the Grand Banks of Newfoundland.

At the end of the season, the captain, impressed with Lawe, invites him to rejoin the ship when they return for the next season. Lawe and several colleagues are left in the port of St John’s, with basic accommodation and food and fuel supplies. For the rest, they must trade with local Indians. The fleet sails to Europe with a huge cargo of dried and salted cod.

Lawe, Trail, Bac and Jorgensen, a giant yellow-maned Dane who claims descent from Vikings, live in a small hut, as do the other men who have elected to stay behind. Food runs short and they barely survive by trading with a local Indian, whom they name ‘Sitting Mouse’, as he never speaks.

Jorgensen is persuaded by Pierre Dulac, a visiting coureur de bois, to visit his store of furs for trade. When Jorgenson does not return, Lawe seeks him out and finds him horribly mutilated and close to death. Lawe and Bac manage to get the broken body back to their hut, but Trail has deserted with the remaining food supplies.

Lawe and Bac cover Jorgenson’s body with a stone cairn. In the Spring, when the ice starts to melt, they launch the body on a raft out to sea in an imitation of a Viking burial, as Jorgensen had wanted.

The fishing fleet is sighted returning; Lawe and Bac are saved.

Lawe rejoins the crew of the Consuela and continues the work of fishing for cod in season. Off-season, he takes berths on other ships, including those visiting Florida. The Consuelo is wrecked on Sable Island and Lawe is one of the few survivors.

The port of St John’s, although theoretically a British colony with a Governor, is in fact ruled by Captain Jasper Bunce, the ‘Fishing Admiral’, a self-appointed tyrant claiming his authority from the Crown. On board his ship, he dispenses arbitrary ‘justice’ according to his whims, including lashings and hangings. Even Lawe falls foul of Bunce for an imaginary ‘offence’ and he decides to leave. When a Royal Navy ship, HMS Pembroke (1757) anchors in the harbour, he decides to defect, even if it means surrendering to Impressment.

The Master of the ship is James Cook and Lawe becomes Cook’s assistant, impressing with his knowledge of navigation in the local waters. The ship re-joins a British fleet sailing up the Saint Lawrence River to take Quebec from the French. The advance party, carrying soldiers and marines who will form part of an army led by James Wolfe, is to survey the treacherous waters of the river. Cook and Lawe lead the survey, setting out navigational markers which the main fleet will follow. On return, Lawe is rated as Master’s Mate.

Wolfe bides his time in leading the British army in a siege of Quebec, until he detects a narrow and treacherous path up the cliff to the Plains of Abraham. Cook and Lawe survey the path and conclude that a stealth approach at night is possible, though dangerous. The army, with its guns, makes its way up and overpowers the token French guard. At dawn, the French defenders realise what has happened, and battle is joined. Both Wolfe and Louis-Joseph de Montcalm, the French commander, are killed, but the British army is victorious.

Cook is given command of another ship, with orders to carry out more navigational surveys. With Matthew at his side, now with an officer’s commission, he spends many years on different ships surveying places around the world. He utilises increasingly sophisticated equipment such as a sextant and accurate chronometers to prepare his charts.

Lawe accompanies Cook on his final voyage in the ship HMS Resolution, the sailing master of which is William Bligh. The voyage takes them to Hawaii. In 1779, Lawe is present as coxswain of the launch that is meant to take Cook off Kealakekua beach. He is witness to the killing of Cook, his friend and patron.

Lawe sadly returns with his ship to London. Now with promotion to lieutenant, he serves on other Naval ships, including the Albemarle, captained by Horatio Nelson. But with no wars to fight, both Nelson and Lawe are ‘beached’ on half-pay, which barely affords Lawe a living. This goes on for four years; in 1790, he again meets Nelson, who is now married, in London, whilst longingly watching ships in the Pool of London. He is offered a job on Nelson’s family estate in Norfolk, until a naval posting may arise again.

Lawe walks to Nelson’s estate where he finds himself involved in all manner of secretarial and farming work. He is satisfied with his lot, despite the bitterly cold winters, but Nelson is increasingly frustrated not to have a naval command. He regularly visits the Admiralty in London to request a ship, but in vain. Finally, in the aftermath of the French revolution, the government decides to again mobilise the naval forces, and Nelson is given command of a ship of the line, HMS Agamemnon (1781). Wishing to command a willing crew, rather than impressed men, Nelson dispatches Lawe back to Norfolk to recruit experienced and eager sailors. Lawe does so, and is taken on as one of the ship’s officers. Nelson’s young step-son, Josiah Nisbet, joins as a Midshipman.

Nelson’s ship is attached to a fleet commanded by Admiral Hood and despatched to the Mediterranean to blockade the French port of Toulon. It is then detached, with orders to proceed to Naples, where Nelson must persuade the Neapolitans to join the fight against France. The ship arrives in Naples and is visited by the British Ambassador, Sir William Hamilton. Nelson and Lawe are housed in Sir William’s luxurious palazzo, and meet his wife Emma. They are entertained after dinner by Emma Hamilton’s famed ‘attitudes’.

Nelson and Lawe dine with King Ferdinand. The latter promises an army to join the fight against the French, and requests a visit to Nelson’s ship. Events overtake them and the ship must leave to attack a French fleet sighted off Sardinia.

After his victories over the French and Spanish fleets at the Battle of Cape St Vincent and others, Nelson, now a Rear-Admiral, commands the fleet from his flagship, HMS Vanguard (1787). He plans an attack on a large French fleet at Aboukir Bay, precipitating the Battle of the Nile of 1798. Although badly wounded, Nelson is victorious. Lawe is thought dead, but has merely fainted.

The victory gives rise to the legendary concept of The Nelson Touch.

Nelson, with Sir William and Lady Hamilton, makes a triumphant progress from Naples across land (avoiding France) back to England.

In 1805, Nelson, on board his flagship HMS Victory, engages the French and Spanish fleets, leading to the Battle of Trafalgar. Lawe, on board the ship, is forced to take over as Flag-Lieutenant when the latter is injured. He is a witness to the fatal shooting of Nelson by a French sharpshooter, and also witnesses the death of Nelson.
