= The Cruel Sea (novel) =

1951 novel by Nicholas Monsarrat

- First UK edition
- Author: Nicholas Monsarrat
- Language: English
- Genre: War novel
- Set in: Battle of the Atlantic, World War II
- Publisher: Cassell & Co, London
- Publication date: 1951
- Publication place: United Kingdom
- Pages: 416
- OCLC: 1011639873
- LC Class: PZ3.M75.73 billion

The Cruel Sea is a 1951 novel by Nicholas Monsarrat. It follows the lives of a group of Royal Navy sailors fighting the Battle of the Atlantic during the Second World War. It contains seven chapters, each describing a year during the war.

The novel, based on the author's experience of serving in corvettes and frigates in the North Atlantic in the Second World War, gives a matter-of-fact but moving portrayal of ordinary men learning to fight and survive in a violent, exhausting battle against the elements and a ruthless enemy.

== Plot summary ==
The action commences in 1939. Lieutenant-Commander George Ericson, a Merchant Navy and Royal Naval Reserve officer, is recalled to the Royal Navy and given command of the fictitious Flower-class corvette HMS Compass Rose, newly built to escort convoys. His officers are mostly new to the Navy, especially the two new sub-lieutenants, Lockhart and Ferraby. Only Ericson and the petty officers are in any way experienced.

Despite these initial disadvantages, the ship and crew work up a routine and gain experience. Bennett, the first lieutenant, a mean and shirking disciplinarian with a penchant for bullying and canned sausages ("snorkers"), leaves the ship ostensibly for health reasons, and the junior officers are able to mature, with Lockhart gaining promotion to first lieutenant.

The crew cross the Atlantic many times on escort duty in all kinds of weather, often encountering fierce storms in one of the smallest ships built to protect Allied convoys. The men endure the ship's constant rolling and pitching in the huge waves, freezing cold, the strain of maintaining station on the convoy on pitch-black nights and the fear that at any second a torpedo from a German U-boat could blow them to oblivion. Somehow the tradition of the Royal Navy and the knowledge of the importance of their work carries them through.

They continue the monotonous and dangerous but vital duty of convoy escort, and after one particularly difficult convoy they use all their hard-won knowledge to sink a German submarine. They are nearly sunk several times until in 1943 they are finally torpedoed and forced to abandon ship. Most of the crew die in the freezing waters, but Ericson, Lockhart, Ferraby, and a few others are rescued the next day; however Ferraby suffers a breakdown forcing him to go to hospital.

Ericson, now promoted to commander, and Lockhart, now a lieutenant-commander, take command of a new ship, the fictitious River-class frigate HMS Saltash. (In the film adaptation, the ship is called Saltash Castle and is portrayed by the Castle-class corvette HMS Portchester Castle, as no River-class vessels were available.)

The Royal Navy is now finally gaining the upper hand over the U-boats and Saltash adds to the growing number of kills due to Ericson's determination and patience.

In chapter seven the ship receives a message ordering it to "remain on patrol in vicinity of Rockall" as the end of the Second World War approaches in 1945, and as finally hostilities were declared ended, a well-known quote:

The beaten foe emerged.

All over the broad Atlantic, wherever they had been working or lying hid, the U-boats surfaced, confessing the war's end. A few of them, prompted by determination or struck by guilt, scuttled or destroyed themselves, or ran for shelter, not knowing that there was none; but mostly they did what they had been told to do, mostly they hoisted their black surrender flags, and stayed where they were, and waited for orders.

They rose, dripping and silent, in the Irish Sea, and at the mouth of the Clyde, and off the Lizard in the English Channel, at the top of the Minches where the tides raced; they rose near Iceland, where Compass Rose was sunk and off the north-west tip of Ireland, and close to the Faeroes, and on the Gibraltar run where the sunk ships lay so thick, and near St. Johns and Halifax and in the deep of the Atlantic, with three thousand fathoms of water beneath their keel.

They surfaced in secret places, betraying themselves and their frustrated plans: they rose within sight of land, they rose far away in mortal waters, where on the map of the battle, the crosses that were the sunken ships were etched so many and so close that the ink ran together. They surfaced above their handiwork, in hatred or in fear, sometimes snarling their continued rage, sometimes accepting thankfully a truce they had never offered to other ships, other sailors.

They rose, and lay wherever they were on the battlefield, waiting for the victors to claim their victory.

Two rose to Saltash, off Rockall.

With the war ended, Saltash returns to port as a guard to several German submarines that have surrendered.

A secondary plotline concerns Lockhart's poignant romance with a beautiful Women's Royal Naval Service officer.

== Origins and authenticity ==
Nicholas Monsarrat's own career was the model for that of his character Lockhart, a Fleet Street reporter in the 1930s, commissioned as a naval reservist. Monsarrat spent the war in anti-submarine escort ships, rising to the rank of lieutenant-commander.

Over half a century later, the historian Paul Kennedy still considered Monsarrat's fictionalisation of his experiences as the best and most authentic guide to the mentality of the wartime escort commander.

== Film and radio adaptations ==
The novel was made into the film The Cruel Sea in 1953, directed by Charles Frend and starring Jack Hawkins as Commander Ericson and Donald Sinden as Lockhart.

BBC Light Programme produced a radio dramatisation written by Stephen Grenfell and starred Jack Hawkins which was broadcast on 23 February 1955.

BBC Radio 4 has produced two radio adaptations of the book. In September 1980, a two-hour dramatised version starred Richard Pasco as Ericson and Michael N. Harbour as Lockhart, and with Terry Molloy as the coxswain of Saltash. Recording took place with the assistance of the captain and ship's company of HMS Brighton and the captain of HMS Scylla. The narrator was Martin Muncaster. In March 2012, another two-hour version, starred Gwilym Lee as Lockhart and Jonathan Coy as Ericson. Dramatised by John Fletcher and directed by Marc Beeby, this adaptation went on to win 'Best Use of Sound in an Audio Drama' in the BBC Audio Drama Awards 2013.

In 1998 BBC Radio 2 released a three-hour full-cast dramatisation audiobook as part of the BBC Radio Collection. The novel was adapted by Joe Dunlop. The cast included Donald Sinden (Narrator), Philip Madoc (Ericson), Paul Rhys (Lockhart), Michael Maloney (Ferraby), Helen Baxendale (Julie Hallam), Emma Cunniffe and Jack Davenport. The novel is also available as an audiobook.
