= Nicholas Monsarrat =

English writer (1910–1979)

Lieutenant Commander Nicholas Monsarrat FRSL RNVR
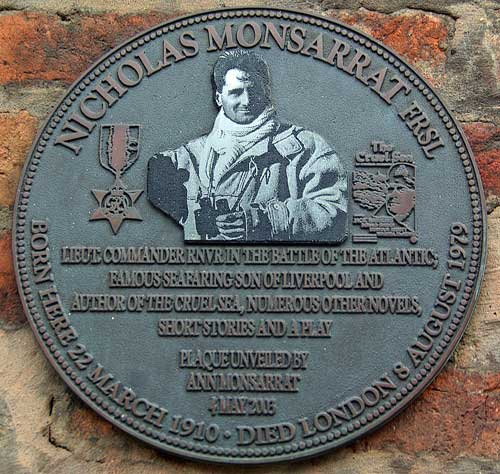
- Commemorative plaque on Rodney Street, Liverpool
- Born: Nicholas John Turney Monsarrat; 22 March 1910; Liverpool, England
- Died: 8 August 1979 (aged 69); London, England
- Education: Trinity College, Cambridge University
- Occupations: Lawyer, writer, sailor
- Spouse(s): Eileen Rowland, Phillipa Crosby, and Ann Griffiths
- Children: Marc, Anthony, and Max
- Writing career
- Language: English
- Years active: 1934–1979
- Genre: Maritime fiction
- Notable work: The Cruel Sea

Lieutenant Commander Nicholas John Turney Monsarrat FRSL RNVR (/ˈmɒnsəræt/ 22 March 1910 – 8 August 1979) was a British novelist known for his sea stories, particularly The Cruel Sea (1951) and Three Corvettes (1942–1945), but perhaps known best internationally for his novels, The Tribe That Lost Its Head and its sequel, Richer Than All His Tribe.

== Early life ==
Monsarrat was born on Rodney Street in Liverpool, Lancashire, to parents Keith Waldegrave Monsarrat FRCS (among the most eminent surgeons of his time) and Marguerite Turney. Monsarrat was educated at Winchester College and Trinity College, Cambridge. In his autobiography, he wrote that the 1931 Invergordon Naval Mutiny influenced his interest in politics and social and economic issues after college.

He had intended to practise law, but decided to pursue working as an author instead. He moved to London and wrote as a freelancer for newspapers. He wrote four novels and a play in the space of five years (1934–1939).

== Wartime service ==
Though critical of military violence, Monsarrat served during World War II, first as a member of an ambulance brigade and then as a member of the Royal Naval Volunteer Reserve (RNVR). His lifelong love of sailing made him a capable naval officer, and he served with distinction in a series of small warships (corvettes and frigates), assigned to escort convoys and protect them from enemy attack. Monsarrat ended the war as commander of a frigate, and drew on his wartime experience in his postwar sea stories.

Resigning his wartime commission during 1946, Monsarrat entered the diplomatic service. He was posted at first to Johannesburg, South Africa and then, in 1953, to Ottawa, Ontario, Canada. He began writing full-time during 1959, settling first on Guernsey, in the Channel Islands, and later on the Maltese island of Gozo.

=== Ranks ===
- July 1940: Sub-Lieutenant
- October 1940: Lieutenant
- December 1943: Lieutenant Commander

=== Appointments ===
- Aug 1940 – Dec 1941: 1st Lt, HMS Campanula (Flower-class corvette)
- Feb 1942 – Feb 1943: 1st Lt, HMS Guillemot (Kingfisher-class corvette)
- Mar 1943 – Oct 1943: CO, HMS Shearwater (Kingfisher-class corvette)
- Dec 1943 – Mar 1944: CO, HMS Ettrick (River-class frigate)
- Apr 1944 – Dec 1944: CO, HMS Perim (Colony-class frigate: a US-built version of the River class)
- Dec 1944 – Jul 1945: Dept. of Naval Information

"HMS Flower" and "HMS Compass Rose" were Flower-class corvettes in the short story H M Corvette (1942) and the novel The Cruel Sea (1951), though the first was a pseudonym for his first ship, Campanula, due to war-time security, while the second was fictional.

"HMS Dipper" and "HMS Winger" were pseudonyms for the Kingfisher-class corvettes in the stories East Coast Corvette (1943) and Corvette Command (1944), (republished with H M Corvette as Three Corvettes in 1945). Again, LCdr Monsarrat could not disclose the actual names of the ships he was serving in since these stories were also written during World War II.

"HMS River" and "HMS Saltash" were fictional River-class frigates in H M Frigate (1946), and the novel The Cruel Sea (1951). (In the 1953 film version HMS Saltash was depicted by Castle-class corvette: HMS Portchester Castle, and hence named "Saltash Castle"). As with the Flower class corvettes, the first was a pseudonym for the frigate he commanded, while the second was again fictional.

=== Awards ===
- June 43: Mentioned in Dispatches

== Work ==
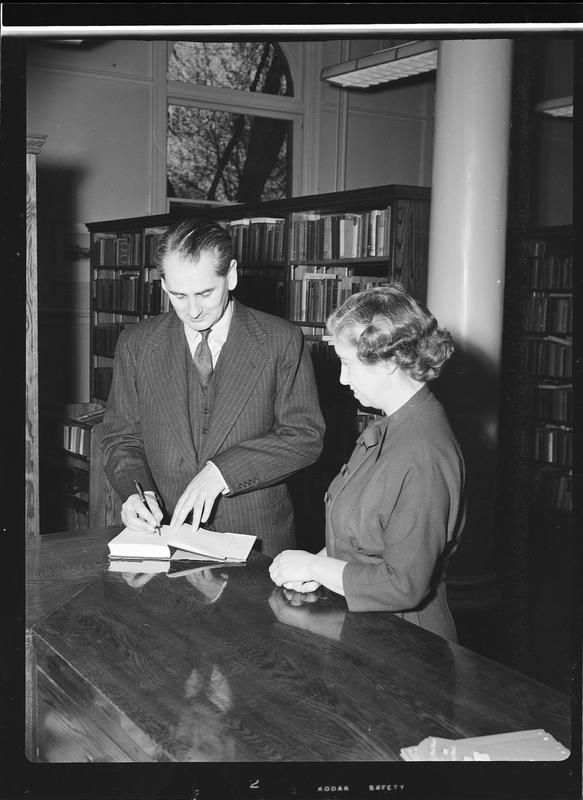
Nicholas Monsarrat signing a copy of The Story of Esther Costello as Dorothy Shoemaker watches.

Monsarrat's first three novels, published during 1934–1937 and now out of print, were realistic treatments of modern social problems informed by his leftist politics.

The Visitor, his only play, was in the same category. It opened at Daly's Theatre, Leicester Square in 1936, and starred Greer Garson. It closed after three weeks, and the theatre was demolished shortly afterwards. Monsarrat wrote afterwards that it had 'enshrined some of his then dearest convictions and been based on a profound misconception of human nature'.

His fourth novel and first major work, This Is the Schoolroom (1939), had a different theme. The story of a young, idealistic, aspiring writer experiencing the "real world" for the first time, it is at least partly autobiographical.

The Cruel Sea (1951), Monsarrat's first postwar novel, is widely regarded as his best work. Based on his own wartime service, it concerned the young naval officer Keith Lockhart during a series of postings in corvettes and frigates. It was one of the first novels to depict life aboard the vital, but unglamorous, "small ships" of World War II — ships for which the sea was as much a threat as the enemy. Monsarrat's short-story collections HMS Marlborough Will Enter Harbour (1949), and The Ship That Died of Shame (1959, made into a movie of the same name), had the same theme and gained popularity by association with The Cruel Sea.

The similar Three Corvettes (1945 and 1953) comprising HM Corvette (set aboard a Flower-class corvette in the North Atlantic), East Coast Corvette (as First Lieutenant of HMS Guillemot) and Corvette Command (as Commanding Officer of HMS Shearwater) is actually an anthology of three true-experience stories he published during the war years and shows appropriate care for what the Censor might say. Thus Guillemot has the pseudonym Dipper and Shearwater the pseudonym Winger in the book. HM Frigate is similar but deals with his time in command of two frigates. His use of the name Dipper could allude to his formative years when summer holidays were spent with his family at Trearddur Bay on Anglesey. They were members of the famous sailing club based there, and he recounted much of this part of his life in a book My Brother Denys. Denys Monsarrat was killed in Egypt during the middle part of the war whilst his brother was serving with the Royal Navy. Another tale recounts his bringing his ship into Trearddur Bay during the war for old times' sake.

Monsarrat's more famous novels, notably The Tribe That Lost Its Head (1956) and its sequel Richer Than All His Tribe (1968), draw on his experience in the diplomatic service and make important reference to the colonial experience of Britain in Africa. Portions of these novels were drafted during Monsarrat's time in Quebec, Canada, with the assistance of his typist and line editor Helen McDonald (née Lafleur). Several have peripheral associations with the sea: The Nylon Pirates (1960) tells a story of crime aboard a modern ocean liner, not pirates in the traditional meaning of the word, but card-sharps, and A Fair Day's Work (1964) deals with labour unrest in a shipyard. The Kappillan of Malta (1973) is as much a story of a place, the island of Malta, as it is of a priest on that island during World War II.

His book The Story of Esther Costello (1952), later made into a movie of the same name, while perceived as an uncomplimentary description of the life of Helen Keller and her teachers and assistants, is really an exposé of sleazy practices and exploitation of real causes in the fundraising racket, similar to criticisms of televangelism. It caused a minor public outcry when it first appeared, and Keller's staff considered suing him, then tried to limit the distribution of the book.

His final work, unfinished at the time of his death but published in its incomplete form, was a two-volume historical novel titled The Master Mariner. Based on the legend of the Wandering Jew, it told the story of a 16th-century English seaman who, as punishment for a terrible act of cowardice, is doomed to sail the world's seas until the end of time. His hero participates in critical moments in history; Monsarrat used him to emphasize the importance of seamen.

=== Autobiography ===
Two non-fiction books, Life is a Four Letter Word: Breaking In (London, 1966) and Life is a Four Letter Word: Breaking Out (London, 1970), comprise Monsarrat's autobiography.

== Death ==
Nicholas Monsarrat died of cancer on 8 August 1979 in London. The Royal Navy co-operated with his wish to be buried at sea. The two naval ratings responsible for the lifting of the casket at his burial were AB Graham Savage and AB Stephen Knight, aboard HMS Scylla.

== Bibliography ==
- Think of Tomorrow (1934)
- At First Sight (1935)
- The Whipping Boy (1937)
- This is the Schoolroom (1939)
- The Visitor – play
- HM Corvette (1942)
- East Coast Corvette (1943)
- Corvette Command (1944)
- Three Corvettes (1945) (a consolidation of HM Corvette, East Coast Corvette and Corvette Command)
- Leave Cancelled (1945)
- HM Frigate (1946)
- Depends on What You Mean by Love (1947)
- HMS Marlborough Will Enter Harbour (1947)
- My Brother Denys (1948)
- The Cruel Sea (1951)
- The Story of Esther Costello (1952)
- The Boy's Book of the Sea – as editor (1954)
- Canada from Coast to Coast (1955)
- Castle Garac (1955)
- The Tribe That Lost Its Head (1956)
- The Boy's Book of the Commonwealth – as editor (1957)
- The Ship That Died of Shame, and Other Stories (1959) (comprising The Ship That Died of Shame; Oh To Be in England!; The Reconciliation; The List; The Thousand Islands Snatch; Up The Garden Path; The Man Who Wanted a Mark IX; I Was There; The Dinner Party; Licensed To Kill; Postscript)
- The Nylon Pirates (1960)
- The White Rajah (1961)
- The Time Before This (1962)
- To Stratford with Love (1963)
- Smith and Jones (1963)
- A Fair Day's Work (1964)
- Something to Hide (1965)
- The Pillow Fight (1965)
- Life Is a Four-Letter Word (volume 1): Breaking In (London, 1966) – autobiography
- Richer Than All His Tribe (1968)
- Life Is a Four-Letter Word (volume 2): Breaking Out (London, 1970) – autobiography
- The Kappillan of Malta (1973)
- Monsarrat at Sea (1975)
- The Master Mariner, Book 1: Running Proud (1978)
- The Master Mariner, Book 2: Darken Ship – unfinished novel (1981)

== Film adaptations of his works ==
- The Cruel Sea (1953), directed by Charles Frend, starring Jack Hawkins, Donald Sinden, Denholm Elliott, Stanley Baker, John Stratton, Virginia McKenna. Screenplay by Eric Ambler.
- The Ship That Died of Shame (1955), directed by Basil Dearden, starring Richard Attenborough, George Baker, Bill Owen, Virginia McKenna, Roland Culver, screenplay by Basil Dearden, Michael Relph, John Whiting.
- HMS Marlborough Will Enter Port – TV film (1956), adapted from HMS Marlborough Will Enter Harbour, narrated by Ronald Reagan, produced by Revue Studios. Teleplay by George Bruce.
- The Story of Esther Costello (1957) (also known as The Golden Virgin), directed by David Miller, starring Joan Crawford, Rossano Brazzi, Heather Sears, Lee Patterson. Screenplay by Charles Kaufman.
- Bait for the Tiger (1957) – television film, adapted from Castle Garac, directed by Paul Nickell, starring Anna Maria Alberghetti, Corinne Calvet, Carl Esmond, Peter Lawford. Adaptation by Whitfield Cook.
- Something to Hide (1972) (also known as Shattered), produced by Avton Films, directed by Alastair Reid, starring Peter Finch, Shelley Winters, Colin Blakely, John Stride, Linda Hayden. Screenplay by Alastair Reid.
- The Reconciliation (1984) – TV film, directed by John Jacobs, starring Roger Rees, John Castle, Jim Norton, Meg Davies, teleplay by Roy Russell.
