= Royal Naval Reserve =

Volunteer reserve force of the Royal Navy

- Active: 1859–present
- Country: United Kingdom
- Allegiance: King Charles III
- Branch: Royal Navy
- Type: Naval reserve
- Role: Volunteer Reserve
- Website: Royal Naval Reserve

Commanders
- Commander Maritime Reserves: Commodore Suzi Nielsen
- Commodore-in-Chief: Prince Michael of Kent, GCVO

Insignia
- White Ensign

- Naval jack

The Royal Naval Reserve (RNR) is one of the two volunteer reserve forces of the Royal Navy in the United Kingdom. Together with the Royal Marines Reserve, they form the Maritime Reserve. The present RNR was formed by merging the original Royal Naval Reserve, created in 1859, and the Royal Naval Volunteer Reserve (RNVR), created in 1903. The Royal Naval Reserve has seen action in World War I, World War II, the Iraq War and the War in Afghanistan.

== History ==
=== Establishment ===
The Royal Naval Reserve (RNR) has its origins in the Register of Seamen, established in 1835 to identify men for naval service in the event of war, although just 400 volunteered for duty in the Crimean War in 1854 out of 250,000 on the Register. This led to a Royal Commission on Manning the Navy in 1858 and 1859, which in turn led to the Naval Reserve Act 1859. This established the RNR as a reserve of professional seamen from the British Merchant Navy and fishing fleets, who could be called upon during times of war to serve in the regular Royal Navy. The RNR was originally a reserve of seamen only, but in 1863 was extended to include the recruitment and training of reserve officers. From its creation, RNR officers wore on their uniforms a unique and distinctive lace consisting of stripes of interwoven chain.

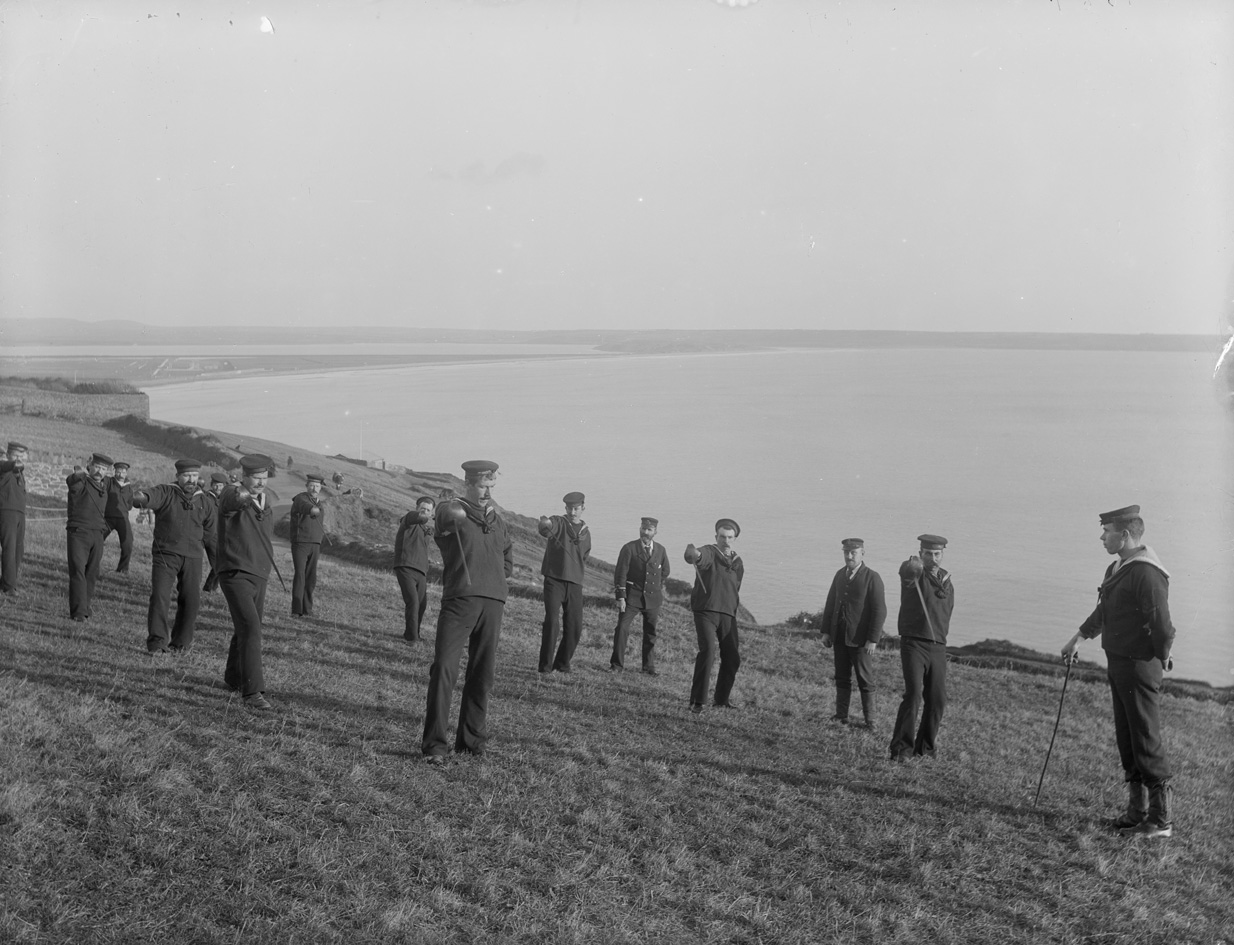
Members of the Royal Naval Reserve training at Tramore, County Waterford, c. 1905

A number of drill-ships were established at the main seaports around the coasts of Great Britain and Ireland, and seamen left their vessels to undertake gunnery training in a drill-ship for one month every year. After initial shore training, officers embarked in larger ships of the Royal Navy's fleet (usually battleships or battle cruisers) for one year, to familiarise themselves with gunnery and naval practice. Although under the operational authority of the Admiral Commanding, Reserves, the RNR was administered jointly by the Admiralty and the Registrar General of Shipping and Seamen at the Board of Trade throughout its separate existence. In 1910, the RNR (Trawler Section) was formed to recruit and train fishermen for wartime service in minesweepers and other small warships.

Officers and men of the RNR soon gained the respect of their naval counterparts with their professional skills in navigation and seamanship, and served with distinction in a number of conflicts including the Boer War and the Boxer Rebellion. Prior to the First World War many RNR officers transferred to the regular Royal Navy. In their professional careers, many RNR officers went on to command the largest passenger liners of the day and some also held senior positions in the shipping industry and the government.

=== Volunteer Reserve ===
At the turn of the 20th century, there were concerns at the Admiralty and in parliament that the RNR was insufficient to bolster the manning of the greatly-expanded fleet in the event of war. Despite the huge growth in the number of ships in the British merchant service since the RNR's foundation, many of the additional seamen were from the colonies or were not British subjects. The pool of potential RNR officers had shrunk since 1859 and experience in the Boer War showed that it would not be possible to call up a sufficient number of reservists without restricting the work of the merchant and fishing fleets. In 1903 an Act of Parliament was passed enabling the Admiralty to raise a second reserve force – the Royal Naval Volunteer Reserve. While the RNR consisted of professional civilian sailors, the RNVR was open to civilians with no prior sea experience. By the outbreak of the First World War there were six RNVR divisions in major ports around the UK.

=== First World War ===
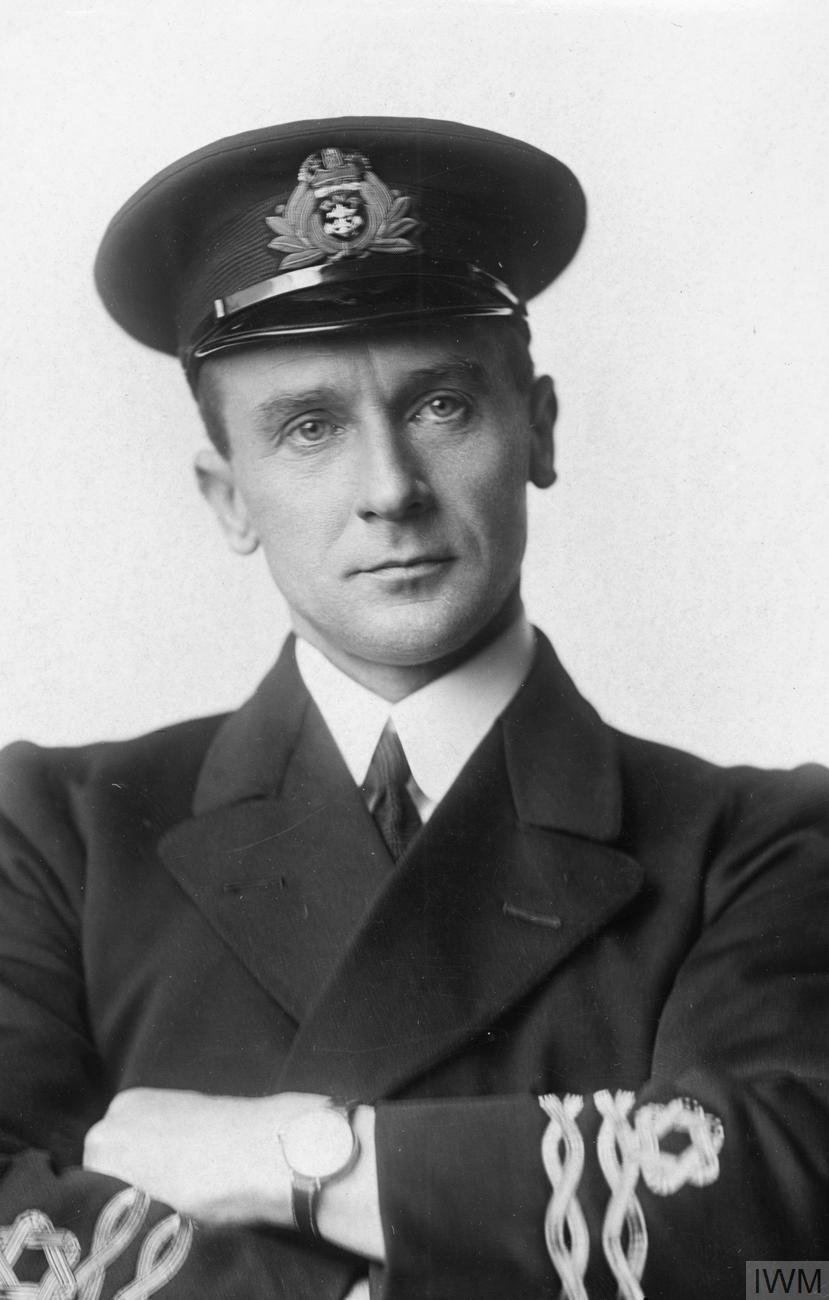
A First World War RNR Lieutenant wearing the "wavy navy" rank insignia of reserve officers

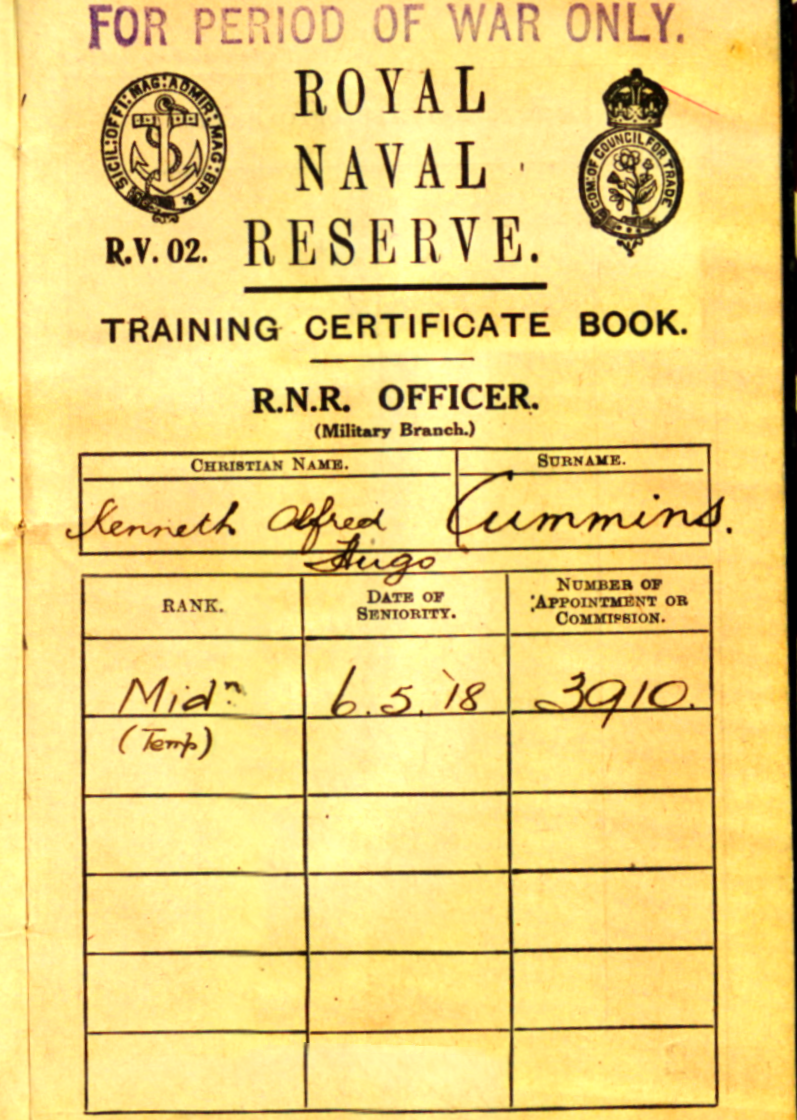
RNR Officer Training Certificate Book, 1918

On mobilisation in 1914, the RNR consisted of 30,000 officers and men. Officers of the permanent RNR on general service quickly took up seagoing appointments in the fleet, many in command, in destroyers, submarines, auxiliary cruisers and Q-ships. Others served in larger units of the battle fleet including a large number with the West Indies Squadron who became casualties at the Battle of Coronel and later at the Battle of Jutland. Fishermen of the RNR section served with distinction on board trawlers fitted out as minesweepers at home and abroad throughout the war, where they suffered many casualties and losses. One such casualty was armed naval drifter HMT Frons Olivae, which hit a mine off Ramsgate on 12 October 1915 in an explosion that killed at least five other seamen. One casualty, a Newfoundlander serving with the Royal Naval Reserve, was subsequently buried in the Hamilton Road Cemetery, Deal, Kent.

A number of RNR officers qualified as pilots and flew aircraft and airships with the Royal Naval Air Service, whilst many RNR ratings served ashore with the RN and RNVR contingents at Gallipoli and at the Battle of the Somme with the Royal Naval Division. Merchant service officers and men serving in armed merchant cruisers, hospital ships, fleet auxiliaries and transports were entered in the RNR for the duration of the war on special agreements. Although considerably smaller than the RN and the RNVR (which was three times the size of the RNR at the end of the war), the RNR had an exceptional war record, members being awarded twelve Victoria Crosses.

=== Second World War ===
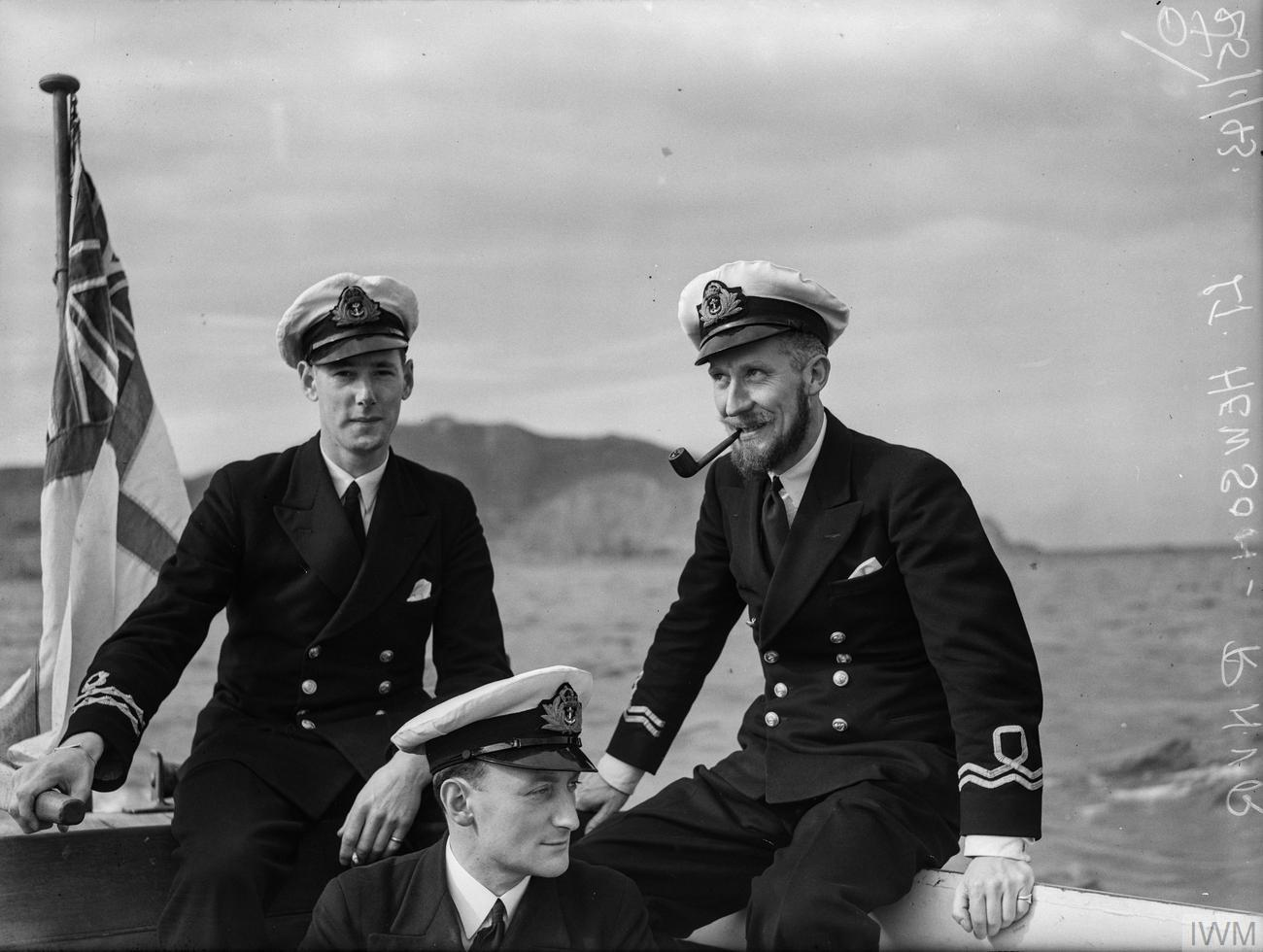
Lieutenants of the RNR (left) and RNVR (right) during the Second World War—note the difference in insignia styles.

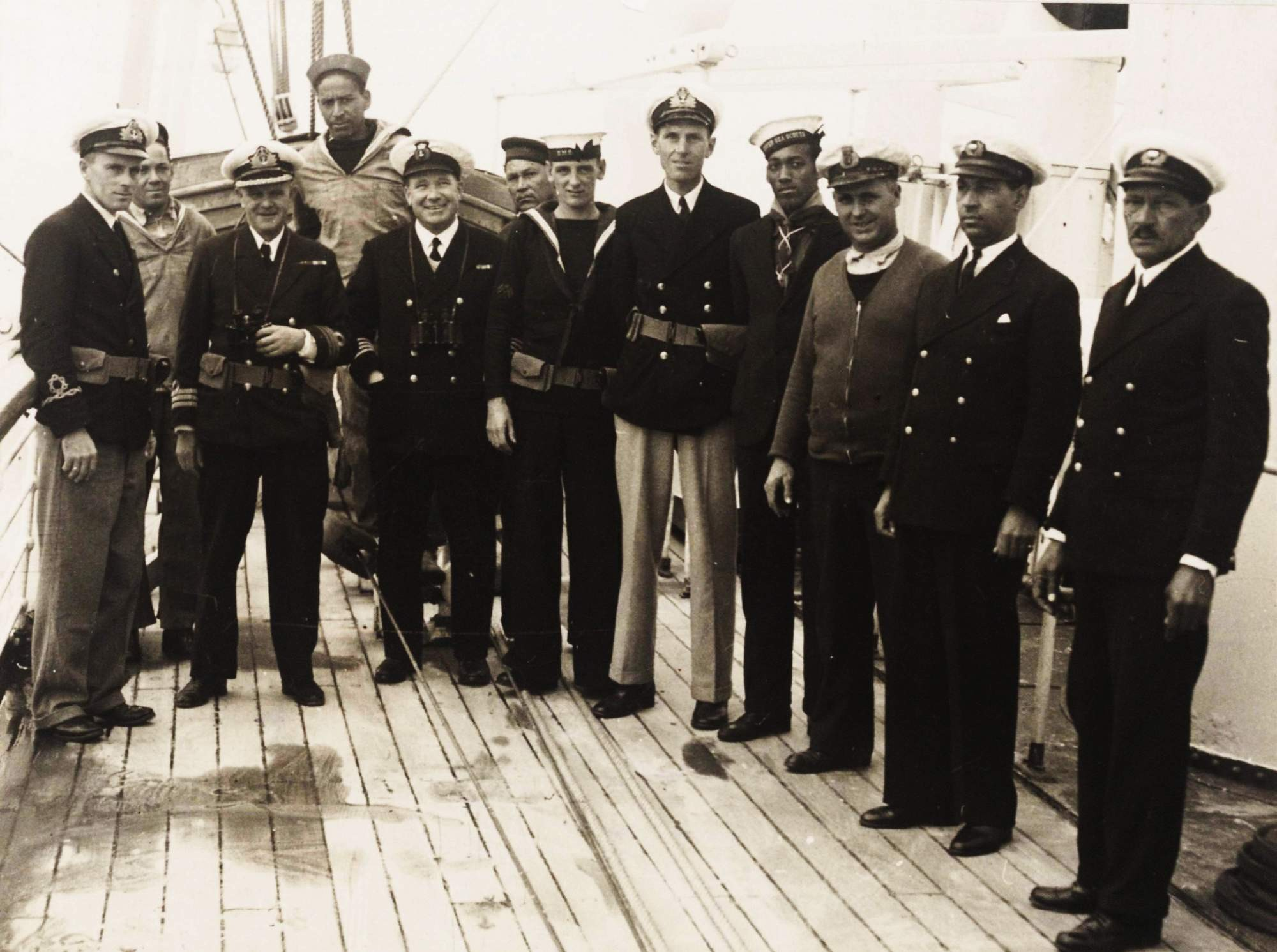
The crew of HMS Castle Harbour, assigned to the Royal Naval Dockyard in the Imperial fortress colony of Bermuda as the Examination Service vessel (that inspected merchant ships at Five Fathom Hole, under the guns of St. David's Battery - designated the Examination Battery, prior to their entering the shipping channel through Bermuda's reef). Crew members shown included a Royal Naval Reserve officer at left, a Royal Navy officer, regular and temporary ratings, Merchant Navy and Pilot Service personnel, and even one older Sea Scout.

On commencement of hostilities in the Second World War, the RN once again called upon the experience and professionalism of the RNR to help it to shoulder the initial burden until sufficient manpower could be trained for the RNVR and 'hostilities only' ratings. Again, RNR officers found themselves in command of destroyers, frigates, sloops, landing craft and submarines, or as specialist navigation officers in cruisers and aircraft carriers. In convoy work, the convoy commodore or escort commander was often an RNR officer. As in the First World War, the RNR acquitted itself well, winning four VCs.

An intermediate form of reserve, between the professional RNR and the civilian RNVR, had been created in 1936. This was the Royal Naval Volunteer (Supplementary) Reserve, open to civilians with existing and proven experience at sea as ratings or officers. In peacetime this carried no obligation or requirement for service or training, being merely a register of people who could be mobilised and trained swiftly in the event of war to quickly provide a cadre of new personnel. By September 1939 there were around 2,000 RNV(S)R members, mostly yachtsmen, who when mobilised were sent to active service after a 10-day training course while the RNVR began with a regular 12-week course for officers.

On the outbreak of the Second World War, no more ratings were accepted into the RNVR and new intake to the RNR stopped. The RNVR became the route by which virtually all new-entry commissioned officers joined the naval service during the war – the exception being professional mariners who already held master's tickets, who would join the RNR. All new ratings would go direct to the regular Royal Navy. With the exception of the RNV(S)R and a proportion of recruits taken on as Direct Entrants (men with qualifications who would serve in specialist roles such as surgeons, engineers and those selected for intelligence duties), all the newly created temporary RNVR officers had initially been recruited as ratings and undertaken ten weeks of basic training. Recruits identified as having the potential to be officers at the end of this training were called Commission & Warrant (CW) Candidates and then had to serve at least six months as Ordinary Seamen, including three months at sea. If still considered a CW candidate at the end of this period, they would become a Cadet Rating and proceed for officer training at HMS King Alfred. Those who did not meet and maintain the required standards while as CW Candidates or while training at King Alfred would continue to serve as RN ratings. Those who were successful would become Temporary Probationary Acting Sub-Lieutenants in the RNVR (those under the age of 21 became Midshipmen). After a month of satisfactory service they would no longer be Probationary and their ranks were confirmed (effectively a promotion from Acting to 'full' Sub-Lieutenant) after three months. Men over the age of 25 who had earned a watchkeeping certificate were eligible for lieutenant rank after one year's service.

By 1945 there were 43,805 officers in the RNVR, nicknamed the "Wavy Navy", after the 3/8-inch wavy sleeve 'rings' that officers wore to distinguish them from their RN and RNR counterparts. These new officers were primarily assigned to anti-submarine warfare/convoy escort, amphibious warfare and the Coastal Forces division - these being the areas of the naval service which saw the most growth during the Second World War, and which were most suitable for employing temporary officers who were quickly-trained in specific areas of expertise. In 1942 the Admiralty revised its arrangements for manning the fleet, reflecting the expansion of the service, the numbers of experienced career officers available and the generally good conduct and performance of the temporary officers taken into the RNVR. A Fleet Order of that year stated that "the Fleet must be manned by Reserve officers with a leavening of Active Service officers, and not manned by RN Officers diluted with Reserve officers." This opened up new postings and promotion paths to temporary RNVR officers, including service on battleships, cruisers and aircraft carriers which had previously been largely the preserve of regular RN and experienced RNR officers. It also put temporary officers on a more equal footing with their regular counterparts when it came to being considered for executive and command positions.

=== Post-war ===
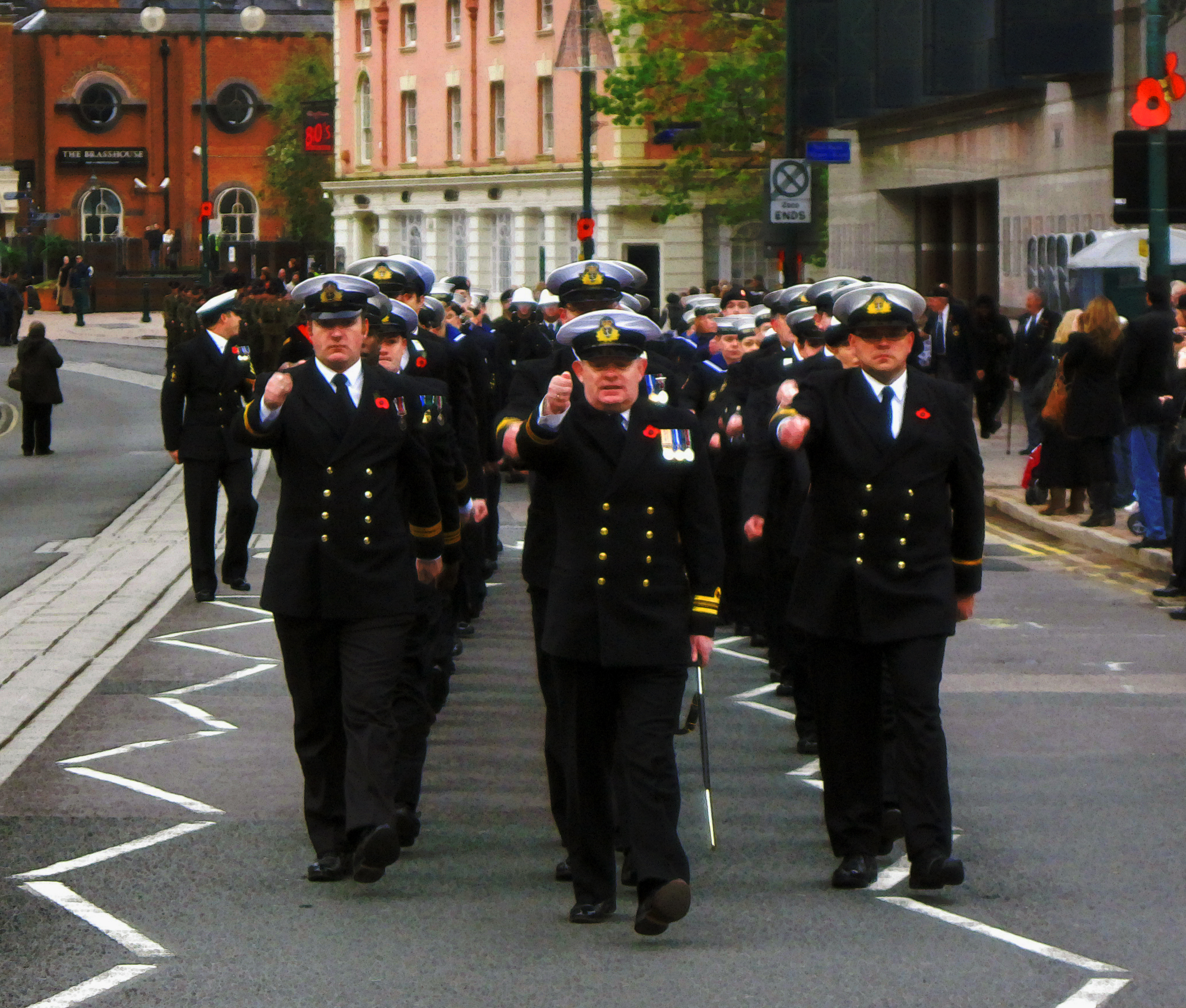
The officers of HMS Forward on parade in Birmingham on 11 November 2010

As intended, the thousands of RNVR officers employed during the Second World War on temporary commissions were quickly demobilised when the conflict ended. Of the more than 43,000 RNVR officers on the Navy List on VE Day, all but 600 had returned to civilian life by the time the RNVR was officially reconstituted in its original peacetime form in October 1946, now with 12 Divisions across the UK. The post-war RNVR was permitted its own independent sea-going capability - something which had not been the case before the war - with Divisions being given charge of surplus Motor Launches and Motor Minesweepers, which were commissioned, given new names and used for training duties as well as supporting larger RN units.

In 1951 King George VI issued a royal announcement that the RNR and RNVR were to lose their distinctive insignia. Both reserves would now use the same style as the regular RN - officers would wear the straight stripes of lace but with an 'R' in the executive curl while ratings would be distinguished by 'RNR' and 'RNVR' cap tallies or shoulder flashes as required.

In 1954 the RNVR's role in the British armed forces for the Cold War era was confirmed - Divisions would be equipped with Ton-class minesweepers which would collectively become the 101st Minesweeper Squadron. This was part of the RN's permanent established strength and would consist of a rotating number of RNVR minesweepers, each fulfilling a period of active duty for its parent Division and giving the men of that Division their required regular time on active service at sea. The 101st Minesweeper Squadron was declared as part of Britain's standing naval commitment to NATO. While only a small portion of the total RNVR was on active service with the 101st Squadron at any one time, it was envisaged that in time of war the RNVR as a whole would become Britain's primary coastal minesweeping force, allowing the use of regular RN ships and men for other duties. The unit became the 10th Minesweeping Squadron in 1962. The Squadron regularly conducted two large-scale training exercises each year, one to Gibraltar and one to North Africa. The Squadron also made a number of overseas deployments, including four ships deployed on operations to British Guiana and the West Indies in 1965. The Ton-class minesweepers were replaced by new River-class ships in the mid-1980s, with all but one of the 12-strong class being assigned to RNR divisions.

From 1938 until 1957, the RNVR provided aircrew personnel in the form of their own Air Branch. In 1947, their contribution was cut to anti-submarine and fighter squadrons only. By 1957, it was considered by the UK government that the training required to operate modern equipment was beyond that expected of reservists and the Air Branch squadrons were disbanded. (The US government took a different view, and the US Navy and Marine reserve squadrons today still operate front-line types alongside the regular units.) The Air Branch was reformed at RNAS Yeovilton in 1980, though it is only open to service leavers.

In 1958 it was decided to amalgamate the RNR and RNVR into a single reserve service. Legally the RNR was the branch that continued, so that no new legislation had to be drafted to allow the service to function and all RNVR personnel received formal papers transferring them to the RNR. The new unified reserve took the name and legal identity of the original RNR but primarily retained the character and structure of the RNVR, being composed mostly of trained civilians not from sea-going professions. The service continues to adapt to conflicts; the AW Branch was formed following the Falklands War in 1982, when over 100 reservists volunteered for special temporary duties during, primarily serving in communications, intelligence, staff headquarters and medical roles. But in the analysis of the conflict it was decided that a reserve of personnel with experience of handling large merchant ships and trained in joint operations should be maintained, with serving Merchant Navy officers as the main focus. The Falklands War also led to the formation of the Public Affairs Branch (now Media Operations), providing a body of trained specialists to manage the relationship between the Navy and the media in times of crisis - this followed several unfortunate public relations errors during the War.

Defence reviews over the last 50 years have been inconsistent. Successive reviews have seen reserve forces cut then enlarged, allocated new roles, then cuts withdrawn, then re-imposed. Options for Change in 1990 reduced the RNR by 1,200 and closed many training centres, including HMS Calpe (Gibraltar), HMS Wessex (Southampton) and HMS Graham (Glasgow). By 1995 the RNR's total strength was 2600 - 800 officers and 1800 ratings. The Strategic Defence Review in 1998 continued this by disbanding the 10th Minesweeping Squadron, meaning that the RNR no longer had its own ships and sea-going capability. In return the RNR was to gain 350 members in total strength. The restructured RNR was designed to "provide an expanded pool of personnel to provide additional reinforcements for the Fleet", mainly in the roles of logistics and communications - specialist support roles the need for which would expand significantly in the event of a major deployment or extended conflict but which it was not seen as viable to maintain within the regular RN's peacetime strength.

This left the mine-warfare, seaman and diving specialists in "limbo" until the Iraq War (second Gulf War), when the Royal Navy realised it had a pool of reservists with no real sea post. Echoing the Royal Naval Division in the First World War, the Above Water Force Protection branch was formed "from RN reservists with no draft appointment at the outbreak of war". Because of a lack of full-time personnel, mine-warfare returned (in part) to the RNR. Officers and ratings serve on active service in Full Time Reserve Service billets throughout the RN, as well as in mobilised posts in Afghanistan, the Middle East, the Balkans and the UK. The centenary of the formation of the RNVR was commemorated by the RNR in London in 2003 with a parade on Horse Guards, at which Prince Charles took the salute. The Merchant Navy officers within today's RNR commemorated RNR 150 in 2009.

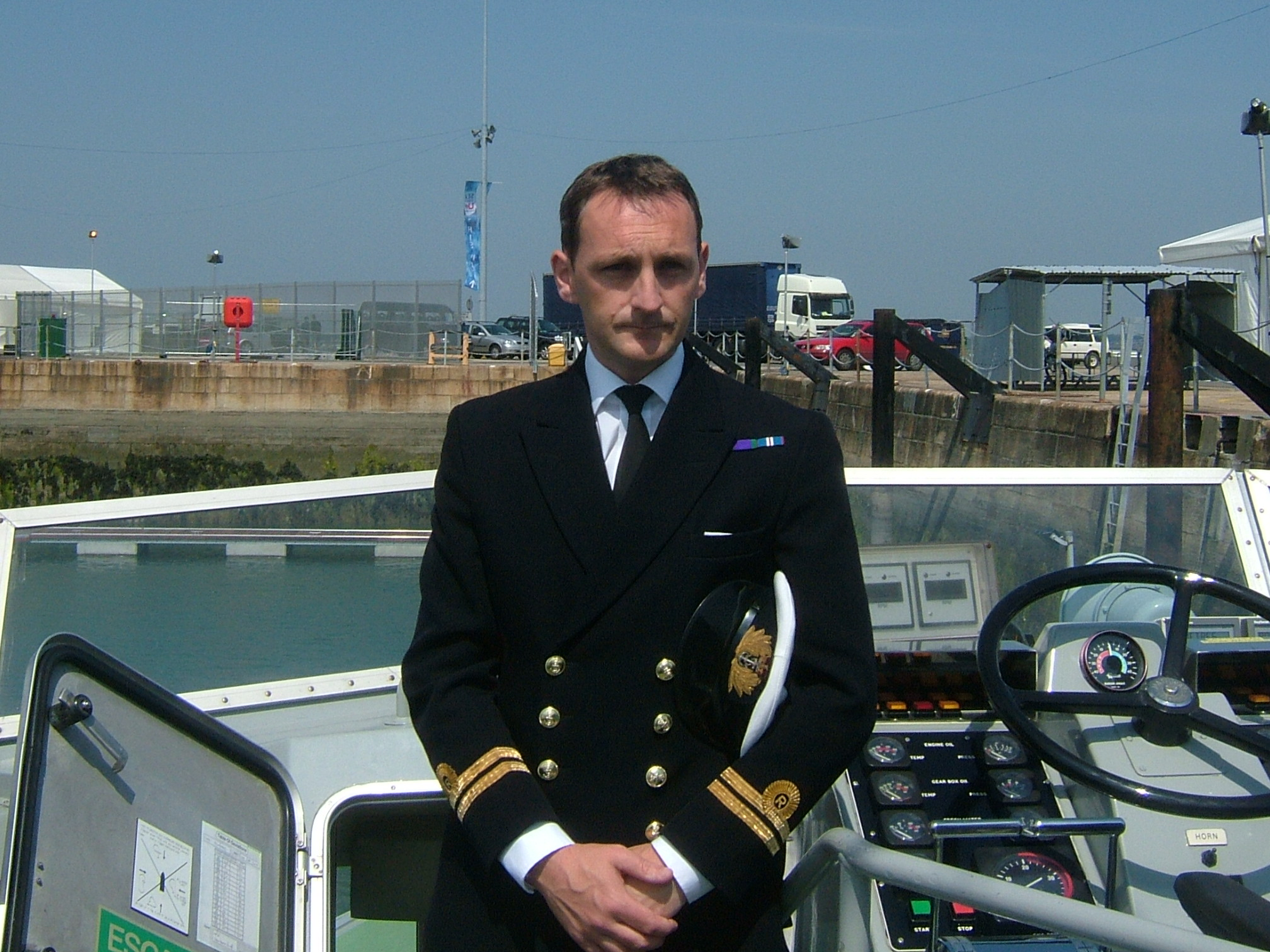
A RNR Lieutenant in 2009.

In 2002 the RNR ceased to be issued its own identity cards, with reservists being issued the same documents as their regular counterparts. In 2007 the last distinctions in insignia between regular and reserve services were eliminated - officers no longer wore the 'R' in the curl of their rank stripes and ratings wore 'Royal Navy' shoulder flashes. The exception is for those holding honorary officer positions in the RNR, who continue to wear uniforms with the 'R' in the executive curl.

Commodore RNR Melanie Robinson was appointed the first female Commodore Maritime Reserves (COMMARES) on 4 February 2020.

In October 2022 a new RNR unit, HMS Pegasus, was commissioned as a specialist unit administering the RNR Air Branch, based at RNAS Yeovilton (HMS Heron) and with a satellite office at RNAS Culdrose (HMS Seahawk). This was the first naval unit to be commissioned during the reign of King Charles III.

=== Branding ===
Since the Royal Navy rebrand in 2003 that cost circa £100,000, the Royal Naval Reserve has been without its own logo; when one is required, the Royal Navy logo is used with the word Reserves added below, and there is no logo for the entire Maritime Reserve. The older Royal Naval Reserve logo is still used as the watermark for passing out certificates issued to Royal Naval Reserve ratings at HMS Raleigh.

== Ranks ==
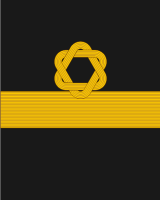
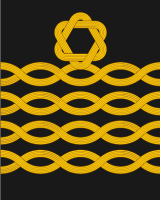
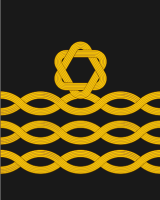
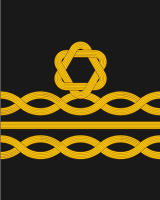
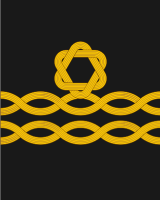
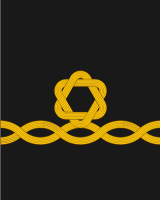
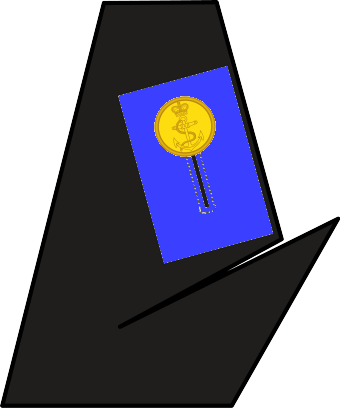
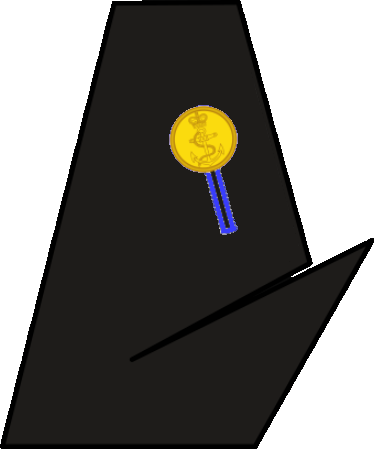
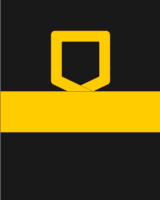
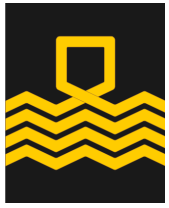
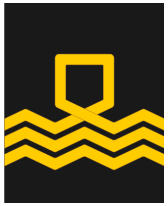
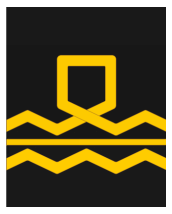
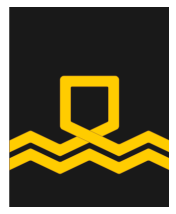
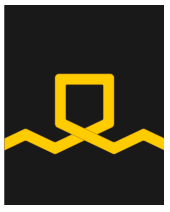
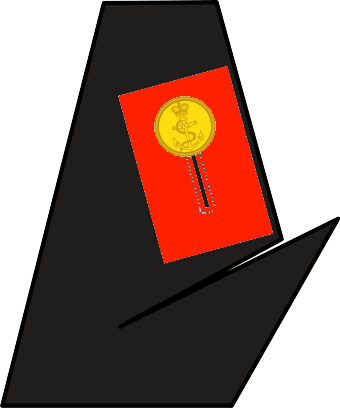
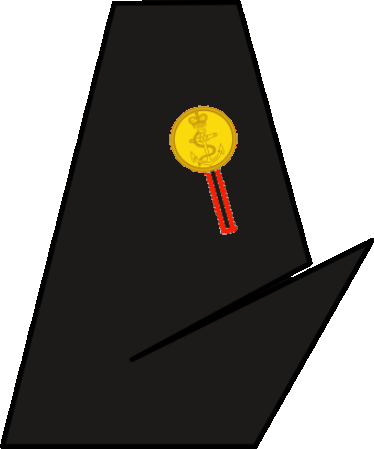
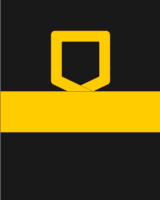
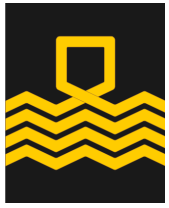
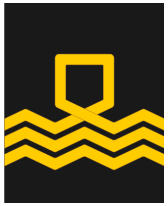
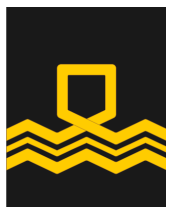
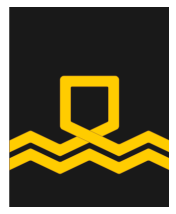
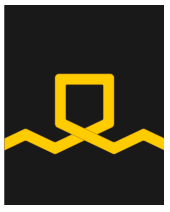
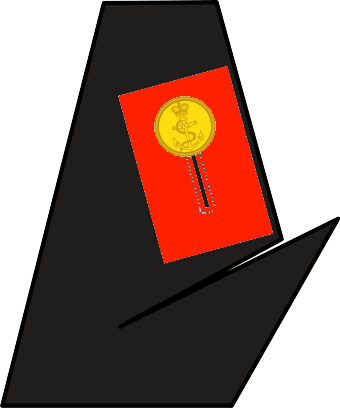
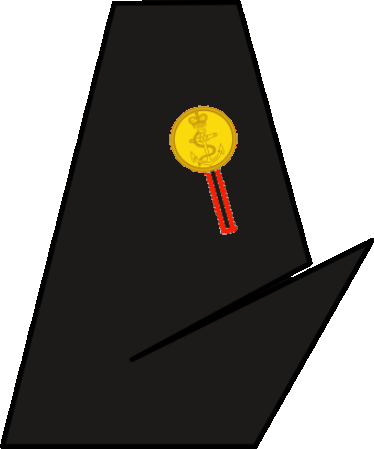
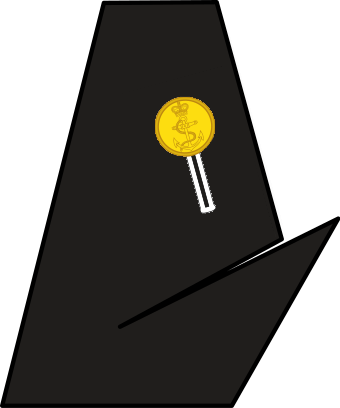
Rank group	General / flag officers					Senior officers			Junior officers
Royal Naval Reserve (1916–1951)
Royal Naval Reserve (1916–1951)					Commodore	Captain	Commander	Lieutenant commander	Lieutenant	Sub lieutenant	Midshipman	Naval Cadet
Royal Naval Volunteer Reserve (1916–1941)
Royal Naval Volunteer Reserve (1916–1941)					Commodore	Captain	Commander	Lieutenant commander	Lieutenant	Sub lieutenant	Midshipman	Naval Cadet
Royal Naval Volunteer Reserve (1942–1951)
Royal Naval Volunteer Reserve (1942–1951)					Commodore	Captain	Commander	Lieutenant commander	Lieutenant	Sub lieutenant	Midshipman	Naval Cadet
Royal Naval Reserve (1952–2006)
Royal Naval Reserve (1952–2006)					Commodore	Captain	Commander	Lieutenant commander	Lieutenant	Sub lieutenant	Midshipman	Naval Cadet
NATO code	OF-10	OF-9	OF-8	OF-7	OF-6	OF-5	OF-4	OF-3	OF-2	OF-1

== Trades and specialisations ==
All RNR personnel, regardless of rank, enrol as general service before being later assigned to a branch of service. RNR Officers join as a General Duty Reserve, and specialise after commissioning and passing their Fleet Board while RNR Ratings join as General Entry and specialise after basic training.

Most branches are open to both ratings and officers with the exception of fleet protection (ratings only) and a small number which recruit exclusively from the officer ranks. Listed below is an overview of branches, each of which contains further sub-specialisations.

=== New Entry Branch ===
- New Entry Ratings
- Officer Cadets
- New Entry Training Officers

=== General Warfare (GW) ===
- General Warfare Ratings (formerly WarSea spec, formerly SeaRes spec)
- Mine Warfare
- Amphibious Warfare
- Submarine Operations
- Advanced Warfare (typically former Regular Principal Warfare Officers)

=== Information Warfare (IW) ===
- Intelligence (HMS Ferret)
- Information Operations
- Media Operations
- Maritime Trade Operations
- Cyber

=== Supporting Functions ===
- Logistics Branch
- Medical Branch (including Queen Alexandra's Royal Naval Nursing Service )
- Royal Navy Chaplaincy Services
- Engineering Branch (ex-regular)

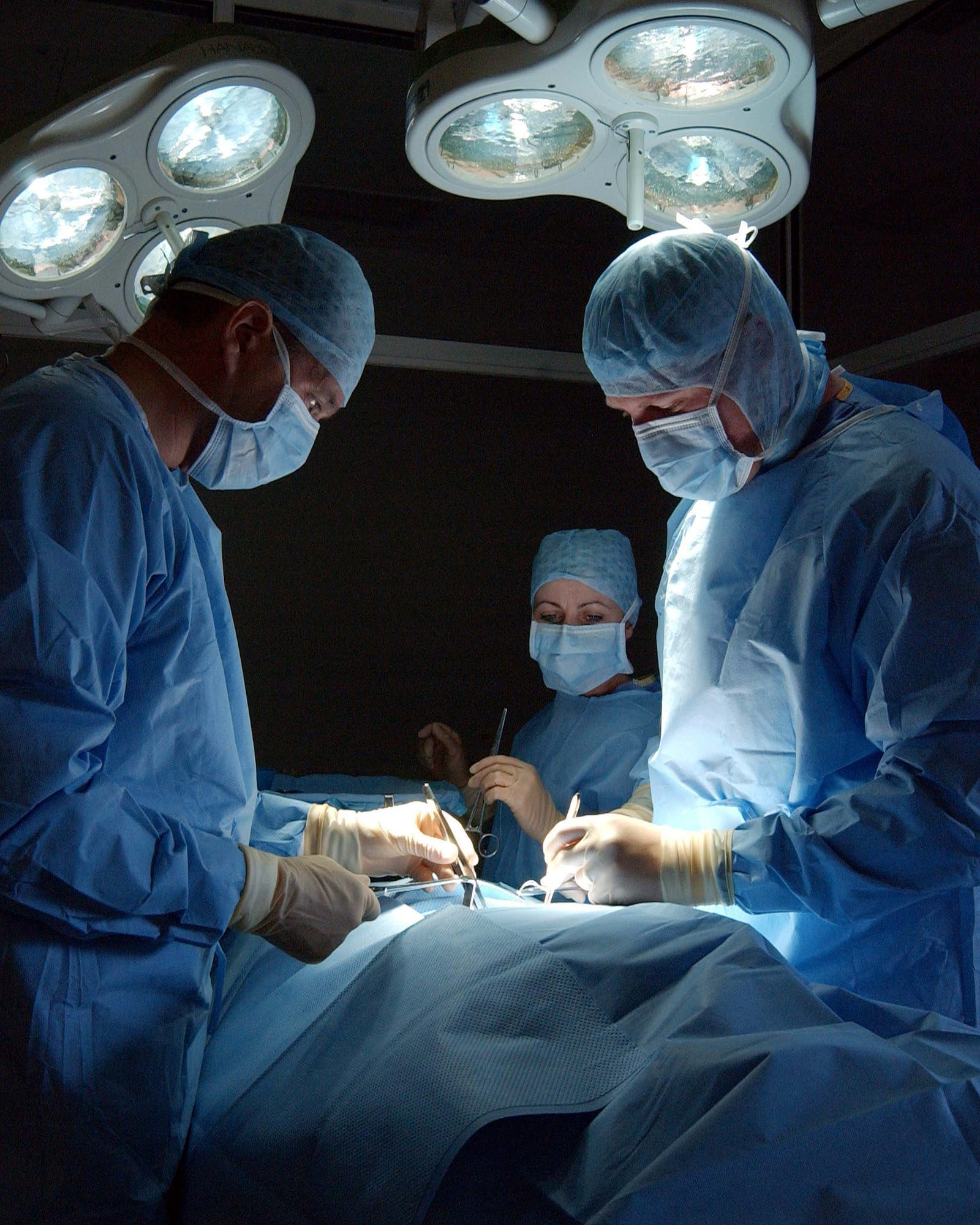
Royal Naval Reserve (RNR) nurses at work in the operating theatre

=== Air Branch (ex-regular) ===
- Flying Operations
- Operational Support
- Air Engineering

== URNU and Sea Cadet Corps ==
=== University Royal Naval Unit (URNU) ===
The University Royal Naval Units, although under the jurisdiction of BRNC Dartmouth, are also an honorary part of the Royal Naval Reserve. Students hold the rank of officer cadet (OC), and can be promoted to honorary midshipman on completion of their second year. URNU OCs can now undergo the Accelerated Officer Programme (AOP) to become substantive RNR Midshipmen. They can then either continue on an RNR Unit or be seconded back to their URNU for the duration of their university studies. Training Officers attached to URNUs are appointed as temporary officers in the RNR, without commission or call-up liability, who wear the 'R' in their executive curl.

=== Sea Cadet Corps (SCC) ===
As nominal members of the RNR (SCC RNR), officers of the Sea Cadet Corps and the RN CCF Combined Cadet Force retain the use of the former RNVR 'wavy navy' lace. However, unlike their traditional RNVR counterparts, they are civilians, do not come under General Trained Strength and are not liable to be called up or deploy.

Officers receive a Cadet Forces commission, introduced in 2017 and restated in 2018; previously they were appointed within their respective Corps, rather than commissioned (unless they already held a commission separately). They are titled ‘(SCC) RNR’ or ‘(CCF) RNR’ to differentiate from the deployable Royal Naval Reserve.

== Units ==
RNR unit locations in the United Kingdom

The modern RNR has sixteen Royal Naval Reserve Units (with three satellite units). These are:

- HMS Scotia (Rosyth)
  - Tay Division (Dundee)
- HMS Cambria (Cardiff)
  - Tawe Division (Swansea)
- HMS Dalriada (Glasgow)
- HMS Flying Fox (Bristol)
- HMS Calliope (Gateshead)
- HMS Ceres (Leeds)
- HMS President (London)
  - Medway Division (Chatham)
- HMS Eaglet (Liverpool)
- HMS Vivid (Devonport)
- HMS Sherwood (Nottingham)
- HMS King Alfred (Portsmouth)
- HMS Forward (Birmingham)
- HMS Hibernia (Lisburn)
- HMS Wildfire (Northwood)
- HMS Ferret (Chicksands)
- HMS Pegasus (Yeovilton)

Previous units that closed due to recommendations in Options for Change:

- HMS Pellew (Exeter)
- HMS Wildfire (Chatham)
- HMS Salford (Manchester)
- HMS Dragon (Swansea)
- HMS Wessex (Southampton)
- HMS Sussex (Brighton)
- HMS Calpe (Gibraltar)
- HMS Graham (Glasgow)
- HMS Camperdown (Dundee)
- HMS Claverhouse (Edinburgh)

== Notable members ==
The RNR had an exceptional war record, as evidenced by the dozen Victoria Crosses awarded in WWI; and demonstrations of exceptional merit continued in peacetime.

- Lieutenant Commander Richard Baker (broadcaster) – broadcaster (first BBC newsreader), actor, musician, author
- Commodore Sir James Bisset – British merchant sea captain, Commodore of the Cunard White Star Line (1944–47)
- Commander Joseph Boxhall – fourth officer of RMS Titanic, and last living surviving officer at the time of his death
- Lieutenant Donald Cameron – commander of Midget Submarine X.6 during the attack on the German battleship Tirpitz in 1943
- Lieutenant Commander Ian Fraser – VC awarded as CO of HM Midget Submarine XE-3 attacking Japanese heavy cruiser in Johore Straits. Last surviving naval VC from World War II.
- Commodore Sir Bertram Fox Hayes – Commodore White Star Line
- Commander Charles Lightoller – senior surviving deck officer from RMS Titanic; took his own yacht to Dunkirk evacuation in 1940 aged 66
- Commander Harold Lowe – fifth officer from RMS Titanic; served in World War 1 and in the Civil Defence Service in World War 2
- Group Captain Adolph Malan – fighter pilot in Battle of Britain; former Master Mariner, Sub-Lieutenant RNR (1932–36)
- Surg Cdr Andrew Murrison – Conservative Member of Parliament and since 2014 Parliamentary Under-Secretary of State at the Northern Ireland Office
- Frederick Parslow – a Mercantile Marine Master given a posthumous commission in the RNR and VC in 1919 for his courage in command of a horse transport ship that was attacked by a U-boat off Ireland in 1915
- Daniel Poole – a recipient of the Distinguished Conduct Medal during World War I
- Captain Sir Samuel Robinson – Captain, Empress of Australia; rescue work at Yokohama after 1923 Great Kantō earthquake.
- Captain Edward John Smith – held the rank of commander within the RNR. He was captain of the White Star Line ships RMS Olympic and RMS Titanic, among others.
- Captain Ronald Niel Stuart – Holder of US Navy Cross, Commodore Canadian Pacific Steamships
- Sir Ernest Shackleton – Lieutenant RNR, master mariner, explorer
- Capt John Treasure Jones – last Master of RMS Mauretania and RMS Queen Mary
- Dr Attracta Genevieve Rewcastle – first female commissioned officer in the Royal Navy, attained rank of Lieutenant-Surgeon in 1940
- Lt Cdr Sir Keith Speed – Conservative Member of Parliament 1968–97 and Navy Minister 1979–81, sacked by Thatcher when refused reductions in RN strength prior to Falklands
- Commodore John Wacher – Commodore (Master), P&O
- Lt Cdr Mike Cumberlege – murdered in Sachsenhausen concentration camp Feb/March 1945

=== Honorary appointments ===
- Midshipman Ben Fogle – broadcaster and writer, held the honorary rank of Midshipman in Southampton University Royal Naval Unit.
- Honorary Captain Penny Mordaunt – Conservative Member of Parliament for Portsmouth North and Secretary of State for Defence in 2019
- Honorary Captain Sir Robin Knox-Johnston – the first person to sail solo non-stop around the world

== Selected members of the RNVR ==
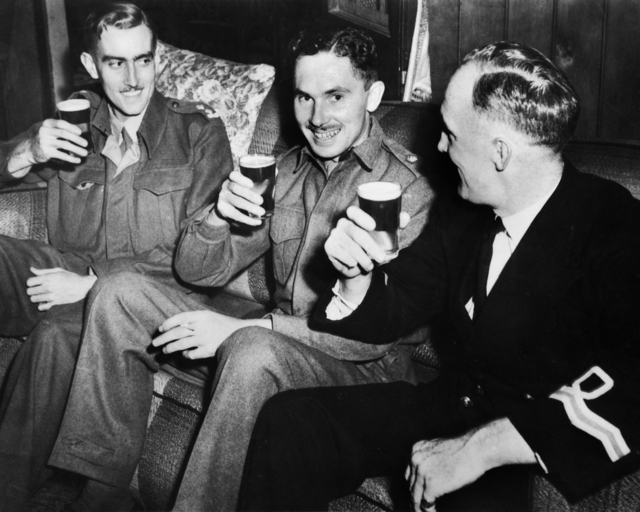
Lieutenant D. M. N. Davidson (right) of the RNVR enjoying beer with members of Z Special Unit in Brisbane after the completion of Operation Jaywick

- Ian Fleming, James Bond author/creator, served in Naval Intelligence during the Second World War, reached the rank of commander.
- Alec Guinness, sub-lieutenant commanded a landing craft during the Second World War invasion of Sicily.
- James Robertson Justice actor, invalided out in 1943.
- Laurence Olivier, served as a Fleet Air Arm pilot during the Second World War, reached the rank of lieutenant.
- James Callaghan, joined as ordinary seaman 1942 and left as lieutenant 1945; Parliamentary and Financial Secretary to the Admiralty 1950–51; Prime Minister 1976–1979.
- Duncan Carse, 1942–1945, British explorer and actor.
- Erskine Childers, novelist, 1914–1918. Mentioned in Despatches for the Cuxhaven Raid; Distinguished Service Cross for the Gallipoli Campaign.
- Lionel Crabb, (well known as "Buster" Crabb), served World War II as a frogman – RN mine and bomb clearance and MI6 diver.
- A. J. Cronin, served during the First World War as a surgeon.
- James Graham, 6th Duke of Montrose, founder of the Scottish National Party. Founded the RNVR in 1903.
- Sir John Edward Jackson, diplomat.
- Sir Harry Charles Luke, served World War I as commander of the RNVR on the Syrian Coast and as political officer on the staff of Admiral Sir Rosslyn Wemyss, he was awarded the Italian medal for military valour.
- Patrick Macnee, actor, commissioned in 1943, became a navigator on motor torpedo boats, reached the rank of lieutenant.
- Merlin Minshall, prewar explorer and racing driver, reached the rank of commander.
- Nicholas Monsarrat, frigate commander during World War II, author of The Cruel Sea, reached the rank of lieutenant commander
- Ewen Montagu, served during the Second World War as a lieutenant commander, where he helped conceive Operation Mincemeat, i.e., "The Man Who Never Was"
- Sir Richard Pim, Inspector-General of the Royal Ulster Constabulary.
- Jeffrey Quill, Spitfire test pilot during the Second World War, reached rank of lieutenant commander.
- Denys Arthur Rayner, escort group commander during World War II, author of The Enemy Below, reached the rank of commander
- Sir Richard Rees, attachment to the French Navy during the Second World War serving as a Liaison Officer (LO).
- Ralph Richardson, served during the Second World War, reached the rank of lieutenant commander.
- C. W. A. Scott served during the Second World War as a lieutenant and was involved in Operation MENACE.
- Peter Scott, served during the Second World War, reaching the rank of lieutenant commander, and was awarded the DSC and bar.
- Christopher Tolkien, son and literary executor of J. R. R. Tolkien.
- Peter Bull, served during the Second World War, commanding a Landing craft (Flak) in the Mediterranean. His memoirs of the war are recorded in "To Sea in a Sieve".
- Sir Lawrence Weaver, architect and founder of National Institute of Agricultural Botany, was an A.B. in the Anti-aircraft service during the First World War.
- Oliver John Whitley, BBC administrator.
- Robert Owen Wilcoxon, brother of actor Henry Wilcoxon, killed in the Dunkirk Evacuation.
- Frank Wild, Antarctic explorer and holder of a four-bar Polar Medal.
- Rodger Winn, intelligence analyst and commander of the Submarine Tracking Room during the Second World War.
- Henry Witherby, Ornithologist and publisher. Served 1917–18 and was mentioned in dispatches.
- Herbert Penny (founder of the Royal Naval Volunteer Reserve in Cape Town which ultimately led to the formation of the South African Navy).
- R.C. Anderson, maritime historian and a founder of the National Maritime Museum, Greenwich, reached the rank of lieutenant commander during the First World War.
- Charles Lightoller, highest ranking surviving officer of RMS Titanic, RVNR officer during the Great War, later piloted his personal boat to join the Little Ships of Dunkirk.
- Arthur Rostron, rescued Titanic survivors as Captain of RMS Carpathia, later captained troopships during the Dardanelles Campaign.

=== Fictional characters ===
- James Bond served in the RNVR, reaching the rank of commander.
- Lawrence Jamieson (played by Michael Caine) in the film Dirty Rotten Scoundrels.
- Ralph Ross Lanyon in Mary Renault's British wartime novel The Charioteer served in the RNVR after being wounded at Dunkirk.
- Henry Root, fictional author of The Henry Root Letters previously served in the RNVR under Captain "Crap" Myers.
- Logan Mounstuart, fictional diarist and author of William Boyd's Any Human Heart, recounts that he served in the RNVR Naval Intelligence Division alongside Ian Fleming throughout the Second World War, reaching the temporary rank of commander.
- Richard Bolton (played by James Caan) in the film Submarine X-1.
- Lt. Comdr. Jeffords (played by James Franciscus) in the film Hell Boats.
- Lt. Cdr. George Ericson RNR in Nicholas Monsarrat's novel The Cruel Sea, played by Jack Hawkins in the film of the same name. Donald Sinden and Denholm Elliott played junior RNVR officers, and Virginia McKenna a WRNS officer. The differences in rank insignia formats are shown very nicely.

== Blue Ensign of the United Kingdom ==
Blue Ensign of the United Kingdom

The Blue Ensign of the United Kingdom has been worn since 1865 by British-registered merchant vessels commanded by active or retired officers of the RNR, when authorised by Admiralty warrant. The flag dates from 1801; this usage dates from 1865.

== Colonial Reserves ==
A number of RNR formed before World War II:

- Straits Settlements Royal Naval Volunteer Reserve – c. 1934
- Ceylon Royal Naval Volunteer Reserve – c. 1937
- Malayan Volunteer Reserve – c. WWII

== Commonwealth Naval Reserve Forces ==
There are also naval reserve forces operated by other Commonwealth of Nations navies, including the Royal Australian Naval Reserve (RANR), the Royal New Zealand Naval Volunteer Reserve (RNZNVR), and the Canadian Forces Naval Reserve. Previously there were also colonial RNVR units, such as the Newfoundland Royal Naval Reserve, Ceylon Royal Naval Volunteer Reserve (CRNVR), Hong Kong Royal Naval Volunteer Reserve (HKRNVR), Straits Settlements Royal Naval Volunteer Reserve (SSRNVR) and the South African Division of the RNVR.

== See also ==
- Army Reserve (United Kingdom)
- British Merchant Navy
- Maritime Volunteer Service
- Royal Auxiliary Air Force
- Royal Marines Reserve
- Royal Naval Patrol Service
