= RAF Castletown =

Former Royal Air Force station in Caithness, Scotland

RAF Castletown
- Castletown, Caithness in Scotland

Site information
- Type: Royal Air Force satellite station
- Code: AX
- Owner: Air Ministry
- Operator: Royal Air Force
- Controlled by: RAF Fighter Command * No. 13 Group RAF * No. 14 Group RAF

Location
- Shown within Caithness RAF Castletown (the United Kingdom)
- Coordinates: 58°34′58″N 003°20′27″W

Site history
- Built: 1939/40
- In use: May 1940 – 1945
- Battles/wars: European theatre of World War II
- Events: Battle of Britain & Defence of Scapa Flow

Airfield information
- Elevation: 27 metres (89 ft) AMSL
Runways
Direction	Length and surface
00/00	Asphalt
00/00	Asphalt
00/00	Asphalt

Royal Air Force Castletown or more simply RAF Castletown, is a former Royal Air Force satellite station that operated during the Second World War. Built near to Castletown in Caithness, Scotland the station opened in 1940 and closed in 1945. Initially built to provide a base for fighter cover for the Royal Navy base at Scapa Flow, it later became an air-sea rescue base as well, before closing just after the end of the war in Europe.

== Air defence of Scapa Flow in 1939 ==
At the outbreak of war, the only base available for local air defence of the hugely important Royal navy base at Scapa Flow was the naval airfield, RNAS Hatston. Hatston had no permanent aircraft allocation and was used by the Fleet Air Arm (FAA) squadrons from the Home fleet aircraft carriers when they were at Scapa Flow. There were no RAF stations nearby and the Air Ministry took immediate steps to remedy this by requisitioning Wick Airport which became RAF Wick and by the end of September 1939 Blackburn Skua aircraft of 803 Naval Air Squadron were patrolling over Scapa. At the same time a site was sought for a second airfield. A site was chosen at Thurdistoft near Castletown and work began immediately on the construction of a new station, RAF Castletown.

== Operational history ==
Castletown officially opened on 28 May 1940 as a satellite of RAF Wick. Wick was then a station in 18 Group, RAF Coastal Command though also serving as a sector headquarters for 13 Group in RAF Fighter Command. On 7 June 1940, Castletown ceased to be a satellite of Wick and became an operational station of 13 Group. The new station itself had its own satellite at RAF Skitten, which opened in December 1940.

The first aircraft, Hawker Hurricanes of No. 504 (County of Nottingham) Squadron AAF, arrived on 9 June 1940. Throughout the Battle of Britain Castletown provided air cover for Scapa with 504 Squadron being replaced by No. 3 Squadron RAF and later No. 232 Squadron RAF. From September to October 1940, also 808 Naval Air Squadron, flying Fairey Fulmars, operated there, as one of only two FAA squadrons taking part in the Battle of Britain.

After the Battle of Britain, the threat of invasion receded but attacks on Scapa continued. In 1941 No. 124 (Baroda) Squadron RAF was formed at Castletown to provide convoy and coastal patrols. This activity continued until 1944 when the last squadron (by coincidence 504 Squadron) left and the station began to be wound down. The last known aircraft to visit the station was a Sikorsky Hoverfly helicopter of 771 Naval Air Squadron FAA in March 1945 and the station closed soon after.

As fighter activity decreased Castletown became a base for air-sea rescue duties with No. 282 Squadron RAF being raised specifically for this purpose at Castletown in 1943. 282 Squadron was replaced by 278 Squadron in 1944.

Ground defence of the station was initially provided by army units but from 1942 onwards No. 2816 Squadron RAF Regiment fulfilled these duties.

== Squadrons based at station ==
Sqn	Aircraft	From	Arrived	Departed	To	Notes
1 RCAF			1940	1941		
3	Hawker Hurricane I	RAF Wick; RAF Turnhouse; RAF Skaebrae	3 September 1940; 13 October 1940; 10 February 1941	14 September 1940; 7 January 1941; 3 April 1941	RAF Turnhouse; RAF Skaebrae; RAF Martlesham Heath	
17	Hurricane IIA/I	RAF Martlesham Heath	5 April 1941	16 June 1941	RAF Elgin	Detachments at RAF Elgin & RAF Sumburgh.
54	Supermarine Spitfire VB/IIB	RAF Hornchurch	17 November 1941	2 June 1942	RAF Wellingore	
66	Spitfire LF IXB	RAF Bognor	8 May 1944	14 May 1944	RAF Bognor	
118	Spitfire VI	RAF Peterhead	19 October 1943	20 January 1944	RAF Detling	Det at RAF Peterhead.
123 (East India)	Spitfire I/IIA/VB	RAF Drem	22 September 1941	11 April 1942	en route Egypt	Det at RAF Tain.
124 (Baroda)	Spitfire I/IIB/VA/VB	Reformed here	10 May 1941	17 November 1941	RAF Biggin Hill	Reformed here.
131 (County of Kent)	Spitfire VB/VC	RAF Westhampnett	22 January 1943	26 June 1943	RAF Exeter	
132 (City of Bombay)	Spitfire IXB/VB/VI	RAF Detling	17 January 1944	10 March 1944	RAF Detling	
167 (Gold Coast)	Spitfire VB	RAF Scorton	1 June 1942	14 October 1942	RAF Ludham	Det at RAF Peterhead.
213 (Ceylon)	Hurricane I	RAF Driffield	18 February 1941	11 May 1941	en route Egypt via HMS Furious	
232	Hurricane I	RAF Sumburgh	18 September 1940	13 October 1940	RAF Skitten	
260	Hurricane I	Reformed here RAF Skitten	22 November 1940; 7 January 1941	5 December 1940; 10 February 1941	RAF Skitten	
278	Westland Lysander IIA; Supermarine Walrus	RAF Matlask	21 April 1942	February	RAF Shoreham	As a detachment from RAF Coltishall.
282	Walrus; Avro Anson I	Formed here	1 January 1943	12 January 1944	Disbanded	Dets at RAF Peterhead, RAF Drem and RAF Ayr.
310 (Czechoslovak)	Spitfire VA/VB/VI	RAF Exeter	26 June 1943	19 September 1943	RAF Ibsley	Det at RAF Sumburgh.
331 (Norwegian)	Hurricane I/IIB	RAF Catterick	21 August 1941	21 September 1941	RAF Skaebrae	
404 RCAF	Bristol Blenheim IVF	RAF Thorney Island	20 June 1941	27 July 1941	RAF Skitten	
504 (County of Nottingham) AAF	Hurricane I Spitfire VB/VC/VI; Spitfire IXB/VB	RAF Wick; RAF Redhill; RAF Hornchurch	21 June 1940; 19 September 1943; 10 March 1944	2 September 1940; 18 October 1943; 30 April 1944	RAF Catterick; RAF Peterhead; RAF Digby	Full strength. Det at Sumburgh. Full strength.
607 (County of Durham) AAF	Hurricane I	RAF Skitten	27 July 1941	20 August 1941	RAF Skitten	
610 (County of Chester) AAF	Spitfire VB/VC	RAF Ludham	15 October 1942	20 January 1943	RAF Westhampnett	
808 FAA	Fulmar I	RNAS Worthy Down	5 September 1940	2 October 1940	RNAS Donibristle	

The following RAF Regiment units were here at some point:

- No. 2833 Squadron RAF Regiment
- No. 2877 Squadron RAF Regiment
