= No. 281 Squadron RAF =

Defunct flying squadron of the Royal Air Force

- Active: 29 March 1942 – 22 November 1942; 22 November 1943 – 24 October 1945
- Country: United Kingdom
- Branch: Royal Air Force
- Role: Air-sea rescue
- Motto(s): Latin: Volamus Servaturi ("We fly to save")

Insignia
- Squadron Badge: The head of a St. Bernard's dog affrontée, pendant from the collar a barrel shaped flash
- Squadron Codes: FA (Mar 1942 – Oct 1945)

No. 281 Squadron was a Royal Air Force air-sea rescue squadron during the Second World War.

== History ==
No. 281 Squadron was formed at RAF Ouston, England on 29 March 1942 as an air-sea rescue squadron. The squadron was equipped with the Supermarine Walrus, a British single-engine amphibious biplane, and the Avro Anson, a British twin-engine, multi-role aircraft. The squadron disbanded on 22 November 1942 when it was absorbed by No. 282 Squadron.

It was reformed at RAF Thornaby on 22 November 1943 and equipped with Vickers Warwick, a multi-purpose twin-engined aircraft. The squadron moved to Tiree in February 1945 to provide air-sea rescue cover for Northern Ireland and western Scotland.

At the end of the Second World War the squadron was disbanded at RAF Ballykelly on 24 October 1945.

== Aircraft operated ==
Aircraft operated by No. 281 Squadron
From	To	Aircraft	Version
Apr 1942	Jun 1943	Boulton-Paul Defiant	Mk.I
Feb 1943	Nov 1943	Supermarine Walrus	Mks.I, II
Apr 1943	Nov 1943	Avro Anson	Mk.I
Nov 1943	Oct 1945	Vickers Warwick	Mks.I, IV
April 1944	Oct 1945	Supermarine Sea Otter	Mk.II
Sep 1945	Oct 1945	Vickers Wellington	Mks.XIII, XIV
