= No. 284 Squadron RAF =

Defunct flying squadron of the Royal Air Force

- Active: 7 March 1943 – 21 September 1945; 15 October 1956 – 1 August 1959
- Country: United Kingdom
- Branch: Royal Air Force
- Role: Air-sea rescue
- Motto: From The Deep

Insignia
- Squadron Badge heraldry: In front of a demi-fountain, a dolphin

No. 284 Squadron was a Royal Air Force squadron that served during the Second World War in an air-sea rescue role, mostly in the Mediterranean region. Disbanded after the war, it was subsequently reformed in the 1950s.

== History ==
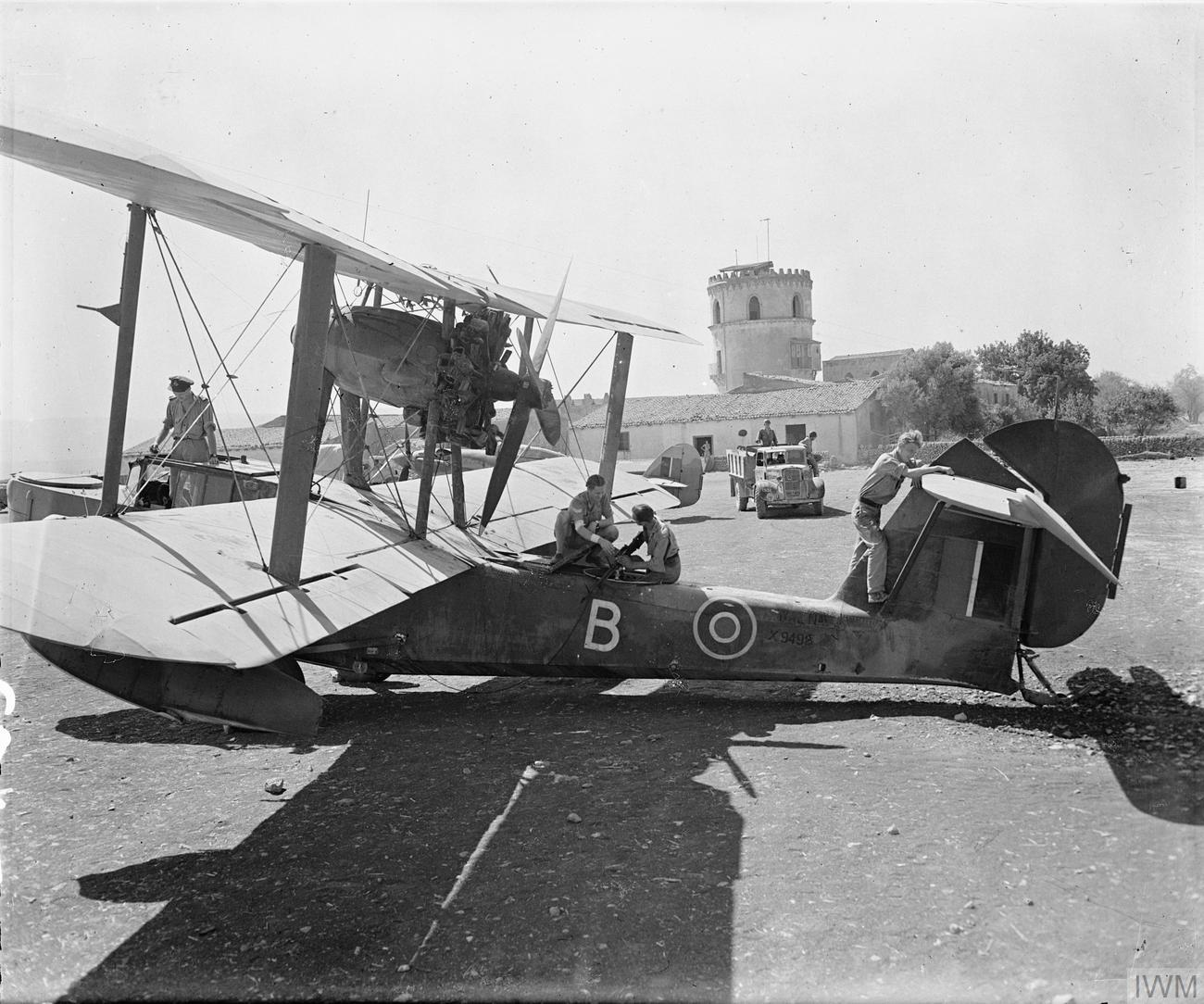
A Supermarine Walrus of No. 284 Squadron undergoing maintenance at Cassibile, on Sicily

No. 284 Squadron was formed at RAF Gravesend, England on 7 May 1943 from detachments of other air-sea rescue (ASR) squadrons as an air-sea rescue squadron. It moved to RAF Hal Far on the Mediterranean island of Malta in July 1943. The squadron was equipped with the Supermarine Walrus and was responsible for air-sea rescue around Malta. Later the squadron headquarters moved to southern Italy during the Italian Campaign, the squadron providing detachments of aircraft as the campaign proceeded. Detachments of the squadron could be found on Sicily, Sardinia, Tunisia and southern France. Warwicks were added to the establishment in March 1944 and the following September the Walruses were transferred to No. 293 Squadron. The squadron received some Hurricanes in their place. At the end of the Second World War the squadron was disbanded on Corsica at Pomigliano on 21 September 1945.

It was reformed at Nicosia, Cyprus on 15 October 1956, equipped with Sycamore HR Mk.14s helicopters in the ASR and support role. In November 1956, some Westland Whirlwind HAR Mk.2s were received and both types were operated until July 1959, when the Sycamores were retired. However, the following month the squadron was disbanded when it was re-numbered to No. 103 Squadron RAF.

== Aircraft operated ==
Aircraft operated by No. 284 Squadron
From	To	Aircraft	Version
Jul 1943	Sep 1944	Supermarine Walrus	Mk.II
Mar 1944	Sep 1945	Vickers Warwick	Mk.I
Sep 1944	Mar 1945	Hawker Hurricane	Mk.IIc
Oct 1956	Jul 1959	Bristol Sycamore	HR.14
Nov 1956	Aug 1959	Westland Whirlwind	HAR.2

== See also ==
- List of Royal Air Force aircraft squadrons
