= No. 282 Squadron RAF =

- Active: 1 January 1943 – 12 January 1944; 1 February 1944 – 19 July 1945
- Country: United Kingdom
- Branch: Royal Air Force
- Role: Air-sea rescue
- Part of: Coastal Command

Insignia
- Squadron Codes: B4 (Jan 1943 – Jul 1945)

No. 282 Squadron was a Royal Air Force squadron during the Second World War that served in the air-sea rescue (ASR) mission role.

== History ==
No. 282 Squadron was formed at RAF Castletown, Scotland on 1 January 1943 as an air-sea rescue squadron. The squadron was equipped with the Supermarine Walrus and the Avro Anson. The squadron disbanded on 12 January 1944 when it was absorbed by No. 278 Squadron.

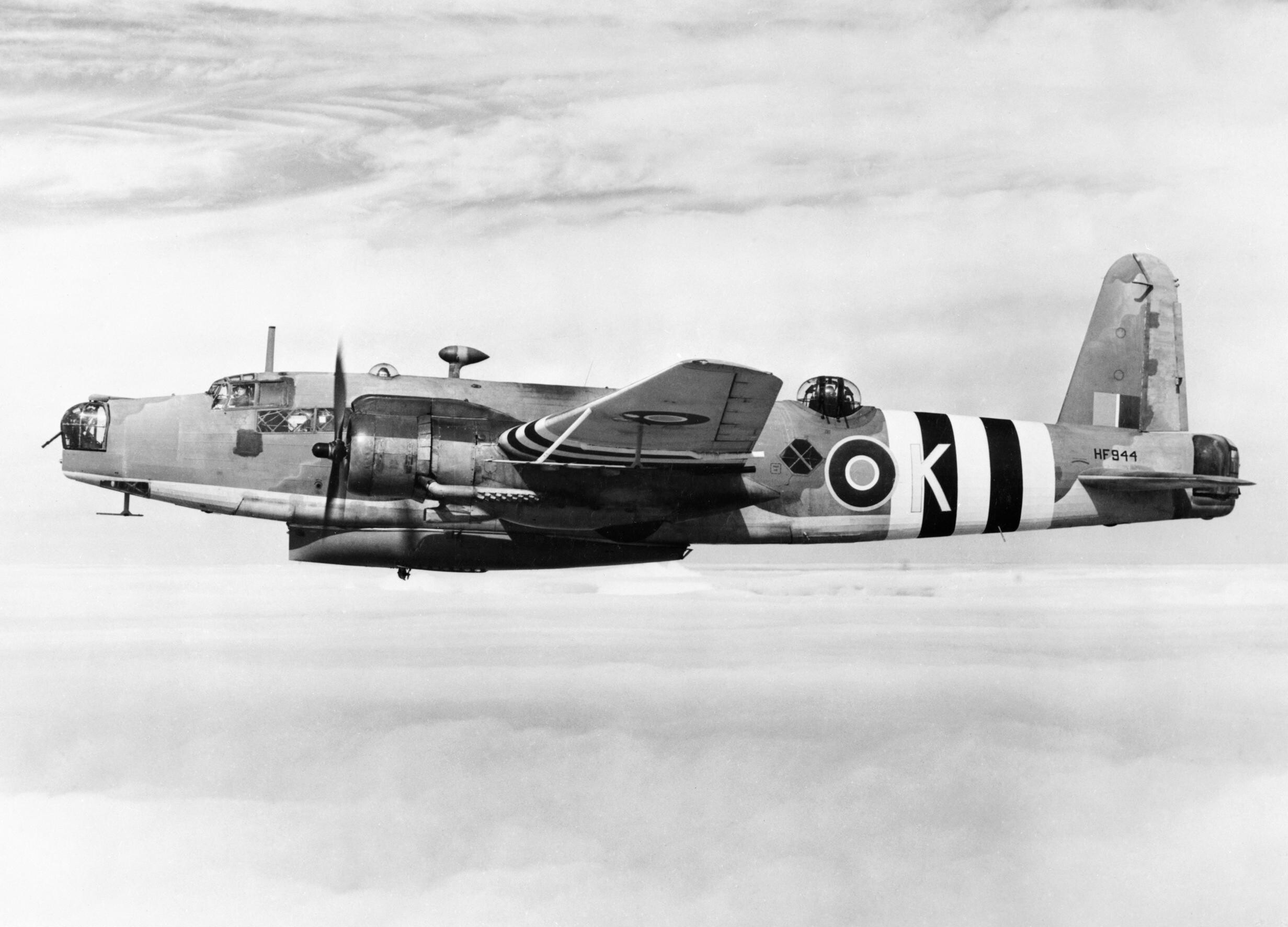
A Vickers Warwick of No. 282 Squadron in flight, carrying a lifeboat

It was reformed at RAF Davidstow Moor on 1 February 1944 to provide air-sea rescue cover of the Western Approaches. The squadron kept the Walrus aircraft and additionally operated the Vickers Warwick and Supermarine Sea Otter.

At the end of the Second World War the squadron was disbanded at RAF St Eval on 19 July 1945.

== Aircraft operated ==
Aircraft operated by No. 282 Squadron
From	To	Aircraft	Version
Jan 1943	Jan 1944	Supermarine Walrus	Mk.II
Mar 1943	Jan 1944	Avro Anson	Mk.I
Feb 1944	Jul 1945	Vickers Warwick	Mk.I
Mar 1945	Jul 1945	Supermarine Walrus	Mk.II
Mar 1945	Jul 1945	Supermarine Sea Otter	Mk.II

== See also ==
- List of Royal Air Force aircraft squadrons
