= 743 Naval Air Squadron =

Inactive flying squadron of the Royal Navy's Fleet Air Arm and Royal Canadian Navy

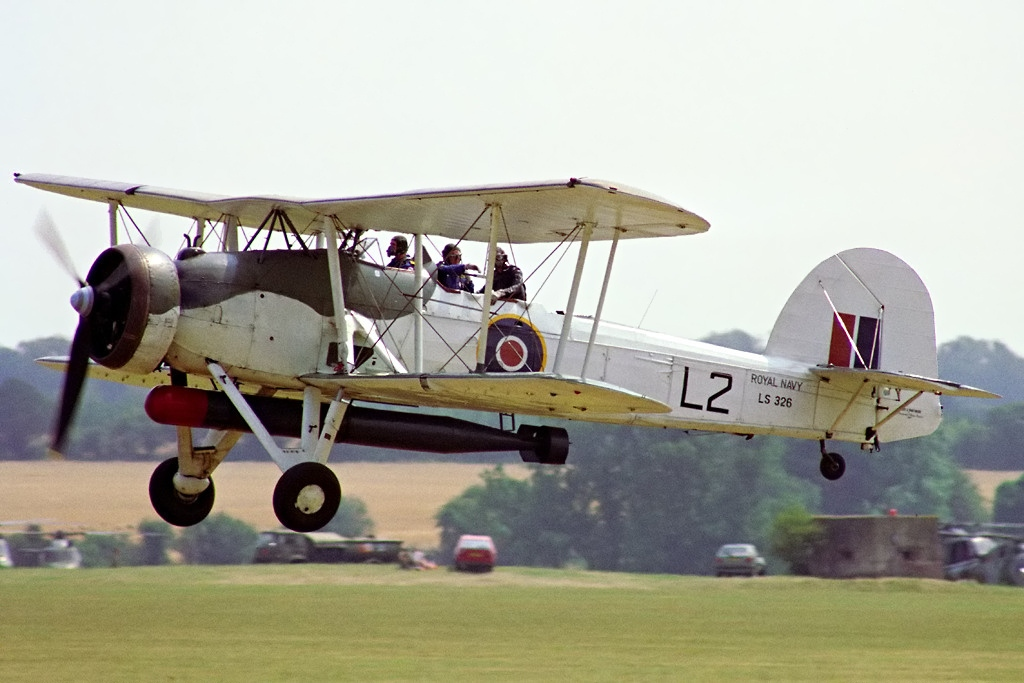
- A Fairey Swordfish Mk II, of the variant used by 745 NAS with both the Royal Navy and Royal Canadian Navy
- Active: Royal Navy; 1 March 1943 – 30 March 1945; Royal Canadian Navy; 18 June 1946 - 1 May 1954
- Country: United Kingdom; Canada
- Branch: Royal Navy; Royal Canadian Navy
- Type: Fleet Air Arm Second Line Squadron
- Role: Telegraphist Air Gunner Training Squadron (Royal Navy); Fleet Requirements Unit (Royal Canadian Navy)
- Size: Squadron
- Part of: Fleet Air Arm
- Home station: RN Air Section Yarmouth (RN); RCAF Station Dartmouth (RCN)

Insignia
- Identification Markings (Royal Navy): Single letters and letter/number combinations
- Identification Markings (Royal Canadian Navy): VG-THA+ (Swordfish/Anson); VG-TFA+ (Swordfish/Harvard/Anson/Avenger); 300+ (Avenger June 1952)

Aircraft flown
- Attack: Fairey Swordfish (RN & RCN); Grumman Avenger (RCN)
- Patrol: Supermarine Walrus (RN & RCN)
- Trainer: Avro Anson (RN & RCN); North American Harvard (RCN); de Havilland Tiger Moth (RCN)

743 Naval Air Squadron (743 NAS), sometimes called 743 Squadron, was a Fleet Air Arm (FAA) naval air squadron of the United Kingdom’s Royal Navy (RN). It was active from March 1943 to March 1945 as a Telegraphist Air Gunner Training Squadron, part of No. 2 Telegraphist Air Gunner School based at RN Air Section Yarmouth, Canada.

In June 1946, 743 Naval Air Squadron was re-established at RCAF Station Dartmouth, Canada, as a Fleet Requirements Unit for the Royal Canadian Navy, becoming part of No. 1 Training Air Group (1 TrAG). Initially equipped with Fairey Swordfish and Supermarine Walrus aircraft, it later added North American Harvard and Avro Anson planes for training. From May 1949 to May 1952, it operated as a subordinate Flight within 1 TrAG, and on 1 May 1954, it was renamed VU-32 (Utility) Squadron.

== History ==
=== Royal Navy ===
==== Telegraphist Air Gunner Training Squadron (1943-1945) ====
743 Naval Air Squadron formed at RN Air Section Yarmouth, Nova Scotia, Canada, as a Telegraphist Air Gunner Training Squadron, on the 1 March 1943. It was part of No.2 Telegraphist Air Gunner School, within the Royal Navy No.1 Naval Air Gunnery School (NAGS), which was under the British Commonwealth Air Training Plan. The squadron was equipped with Fairey Swordfish II, a biplane torpedo bomber, Supermarine Walrus II, an amphibious maritime patrol aircraft and Avro Anson, a multi-role training aircraft.

All training ceased on 19 March 1945 at RN Air Section Yarmouth and 743 Naval Air Squadron wound down. All of the squadrons aircraft were moved and delivered to RN Air Section Dartmouth (HMS Seaborn), Nova Scotia, Canada and this was completed on the 30 March 1945, with 743 Naval Air Squadron disbanding at RN Air Section Yarmouth, on the same date.

=== Royal Canadian Navy ===
==== Fleet requirements unit (1946-1954) ====
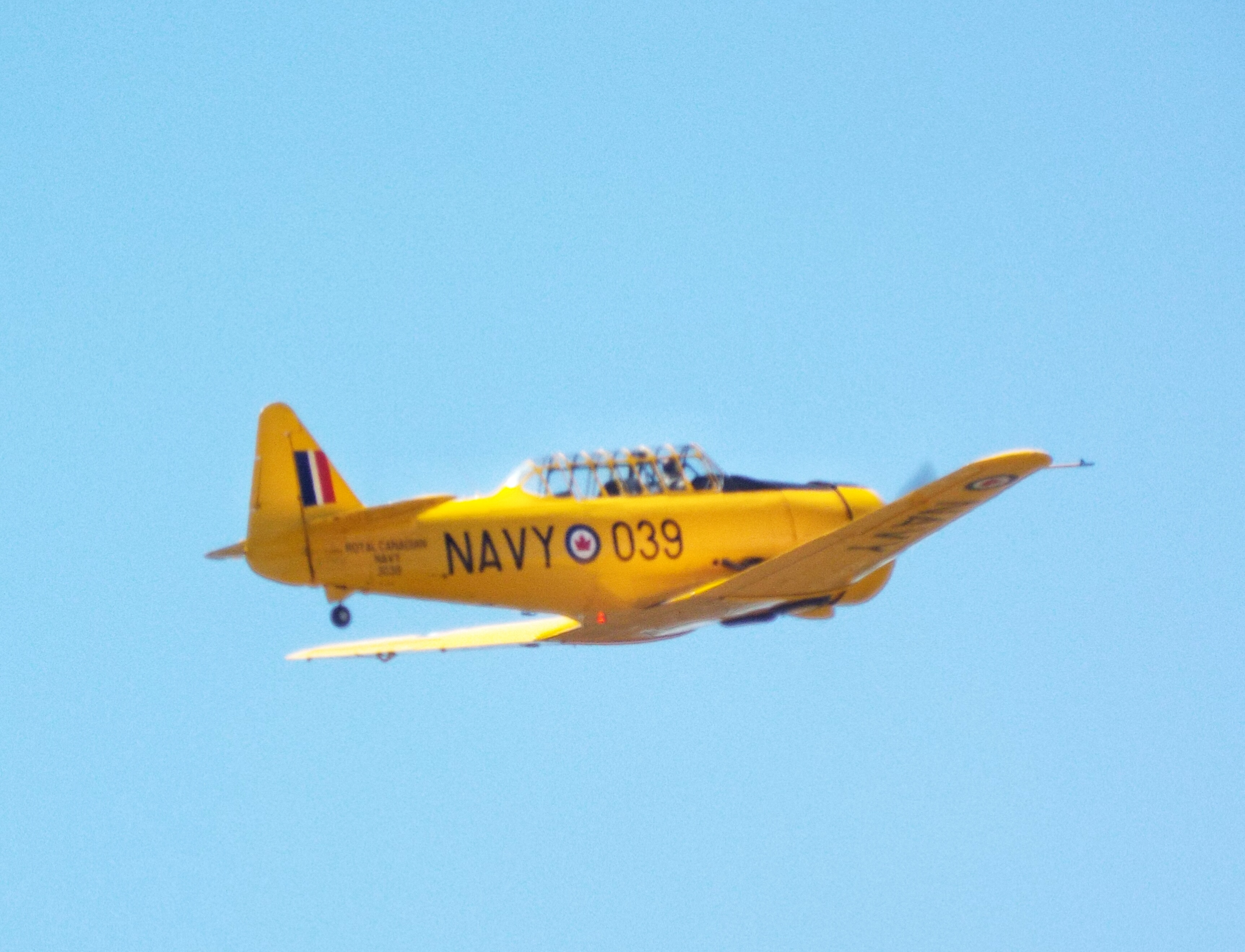
Royal Canadian Navy Harvard trainer aircraft

In June 1946, Squadron 743 was re-established at RCAF Dartmouth as a Fleet Requirements Unit of the Royal Canadian Navy, subsequently integrating into No. 1 Training Air Group (1 TrAG) shortly after its formation. Initially equipped with Fairey Swordfish torpedo bomber aircraft for various utility functions and Supermarine Walrus amphibious aircraft, which were soon decommissioned, the squadron later incorporated North American Harvard advanced trainer aircraft for pilot training and Avro Anson aircraft for navigation and communication training for Observers and Observer Mates, as well as for additional utility purposes. From May 1949 until May 1952, the squadron functioned as a subordinate Flight within 1 TrAG, and on 1 May 1954, it was reclassified as VU-32 (Utility) Squadron.

== Aircraft flown ==
The squadron has flown a number of different aircraft types when under the command of the Royal Navy, then subsequently the Royal Canadian Navy, including:

=== Royal Navy ===
- Fairey Swordfish II torpedo bomber (March 1943 - March 1945)
- Avro Anson Mk II multi-role training aircraft (March 1943 - March 1945)
- Avro Anson Mk I multi-role training aircraft (December 1943 - 1944)
- Supermarine Walrus amphibious maritime patrol aircraft

=== Royal Canadian Navy ===
- Fairey Swordfish II torpedo bomber (June 1946 - November 1948)
- Supermarine Walrus amphibious maritime patrol aircraft (June - December 1946)
- North American Harvard II advanced training aircraft (January 1947 - May 1954)
- de Havilland Tiger Moth training aircraft (March 1948 - March 1949)
- Avro Anson Mk V multirole training aircraft (September 1948 - April 1952)
- Grumman Avenger AS3 anti-submarine warfare aircraft (October 1950 - May 1954)

== Naval air stations ==
=== Royal Navy ===
743 Naval Air Squadron operated from a single naval air station of the Royal Navy, in Canada:

1943-1945

- RN Air Section Yarmouth, Nova Scotia, (1 March 1943 - 30 March 1945)
- disbanded - (30 March 1945)

=== Royal Canadian Navy ===
743 Squadron RCN operated from a single Royal Canadian Air Force station:

1946-1954

- RCAF Station Dartmouth, Nova Scotia, (18 June 1946 - 1 May 1954)
- became VU 32 - (1 May 1954)

== Commanding officers ==
=== Royal Navy ===
List of commanding officers of 743 Naval Air Squadron with date of appointment:

- Lieutenant Commander(A) R. Gillett, RNVR, from 1 March 1943
- disbanded - 30 March 1945

Note: Abbreviation (A) signifies Air Branch of the RN or RNVR.

=== Royal Canadian Navy ===
List of commanding officers of 743 Squadron RCN:

- Lieutenant(N) J.N. Donaldson, RCN, from 18 June 1946
- Lieutenant-commander W.E. Widdows, RCN, from 30 August 1947
- Lieutenant-commander C.G. Smith, RCN, from 20 November 1948
- none 16 May 1949
- Lieutenant(N) R.J. Watson, RCN, from 12 May 1952 (Lieutenant-commander 1 January 1953)
- became VU-32 - 1 May 1954
