= No. 277 Squadron RAF =

- Active: 22 December 1941 – 15 February 1945
- Country: United Kingdom
- Branch: Royal Air Force
- Motto(s): Latin: Quaerendo servamus ("We save by seeking")

Insignia
- Squadron Badge: A winged hand rising from water
- Squadron Code: BA (December 1941 – February 1945)

No. 277 Squadron RAF was a Royal Air Force Squadron formed as an air-sea rescue unit in World War II.

== History ==
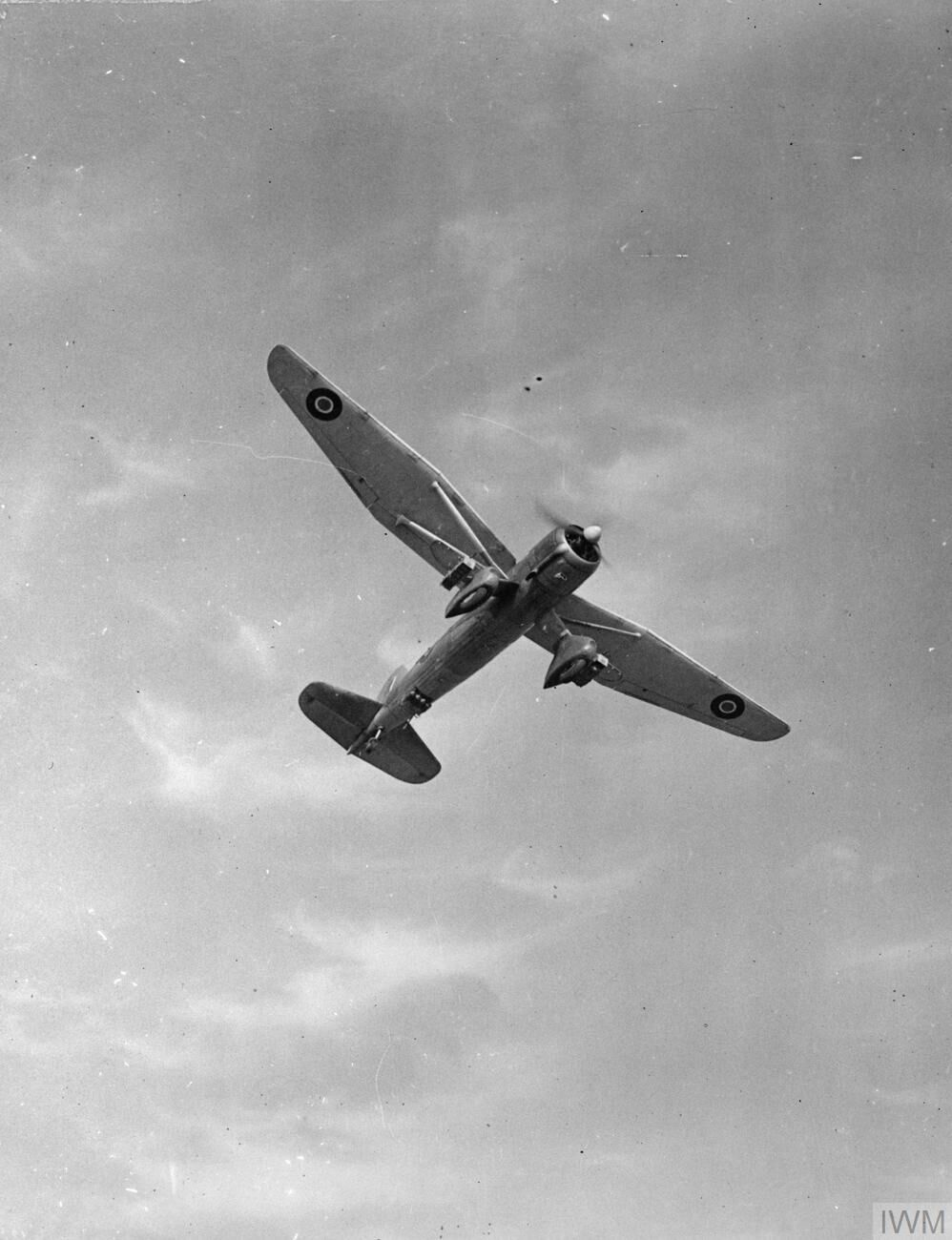
A Lysander of No. 277 Squadron operating from RAF Hawkinge

The squadron formed at Stapleford Tawney on 22 December 1941 and was equipped with the Westland Lysander and Supermarine Walrus. Boulton Paul Defiants and Supermarine Spitfires were then supplied for spotting downed aircrew in the English Channel.

The Vickers Warwick which could drop lifeboats was operated from November 1944 and the squadron was able to increase its area of operations with a detachment based at RAF Portreath. The squadron was disbanded on 15 February 1945.

== Aircraft operated ==
Aircraft operated by No. 277 Squadron RAF
From	To	Aircraft	Variant
Dec 1941	Jun 1944	Westland Lysander	II
Dec 1941	Feb 1945	Supermarine Walrus	IA
May 1942	May 1943	Boulton Paul Defiant	I
Feb 1943	May 1944	Supermarine Spitfire	HC
Nov 1943	Feb 1945	Supermarine Sea Otter	
Apr 1944	Feb 1945	Supermarine Spitfire	VB
Nov 1944	Feb 1945	Vickers Warwick	I
