= No. 123 Squadron RAF =

Defunct flying squadron of the Royal Air Force

No. 123 (East India) Squadron RAF
- Active: 1 Feb 1918 – 17 Aug 1918; 28 Nov 1918 – 5 Feb 1920; 10 May 1941 – 10 June 1945
- Country: United Kingdom
- Branch: Royal Air Force
- Nickname: East India
- Motto: Swift to Strike

Insignia
- Squadron badge heraldry: In front of two claymores, in saltire, the points uppermost, a Tiger’s head erased. The claymores indicate the sqn’s association with Scotland and the Tiger’s head its association as the third East India Sqn.
- Squadron Codes: XE

No. 123 Squadron of the Royal Air Force was a British aircraft squadron in the First and Second World Wars. It was disbanded for the last time on 20 June 1945.

== History ==
=== First World War ===
The squadron was formed at RAF Waddington in Lincolnshire, England on 1 February 1918. On 1 March 1918 it moved to RAF Duxford to begin training as an Airco DH.9 unit using various aircraft. However, it was too late to see action and was disbanded on 17 August 1918.

The squadron was formed again on 20 November 1918 at RAF Upper Heyford as a Canadian-manned unit, again using the DH.9. It moved to Shoreham in March 1919 and was renamed No. 2 Squadron, Canadian Air Force until it was disbanded in 1920.

=== Second World War ===
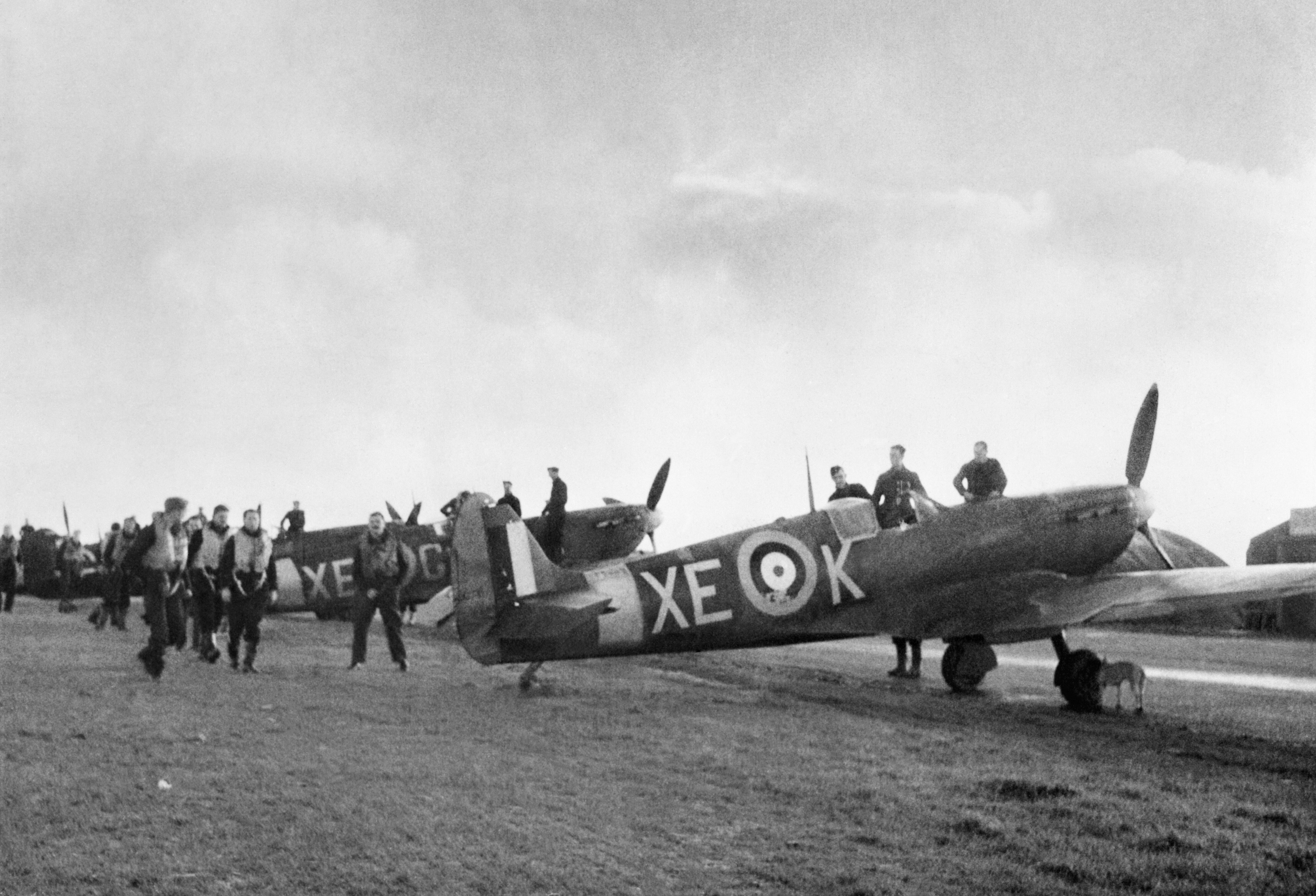
123 Squadron Spitfires and pilots at RAF Castletown, c.1941

In May 1941 the squadron was formed again at RAF Turnhouse in Scotland with Supermarine Spitfires, assigned to provide escorts and shipping patrols along the Scottish east coast and the Forth Estuary. The squadron was also assigned operational training duty; it took on new pilots and exposed them to operational flying before sending them to squadrons in England.

In April 1942 the squadron personnel, without their aircraft, were shipped to Egypt. They arrived in June, but did not acquire any aircraft until October when Gloster Gladiators were used for training. The squadron was moved to the Persian Gulf and was re-equipped with Hawker Hurricanes, assigned to protect Iranian oilfields against attack. Six months later the squadron moved into the Western Desert of Egypt to undertake convoy patrols, equipped again with Spitfires. It participated in the ground-attack role in Crete as part of Operation Thesis. The squadron did manage to keep hold a number of Hurricanes into 1944 when it was moved again to India in the Chittagong area. It was a busy time for the squadron with ground-attack sorties and bomber escorts and in June 1944 it re-equipped with the American Republic P-47 Thunderbolts, and continued in support of the Army operations and escorting Douglas Dakotas on supply missions behind Japanese lines. On 20 June 1945 the squadron disbanded when it was re-numbered as 81 Squadron.

== Aircraft operated ==
| From | To | Aircraft | Version |
|---|---|---|---|
| 1918 | 1920 | Airco DH.9 | |
| 1941 | 1941 | Supermarine Spitfire | I |
| 1942 | 1942 | Supermarine Spitfire | VB |
| 1942 | 1942 | Gloster Gladiator | II |
| 1942 | 1945 | Hawker Hurricane | IIC |
| 1943 | 1943 | Supermarine Spitfire | VC and IX |
| 1944 | 1945 | Republic Thunderbolt | I and II |
