= No. 283 Squadron RAF =

Defunct flying squadron of the Royal Air Force

- Active: 11 February 1943 – 31 March 1946
- Country: United Kingdom
- Branch: Royal Air Force
- Role: Air-sea rescue
- Motto(s): Latin: Attende et Vigila ("Be alert and on guard")

Insignia
- Squadron Badge: In front of a Maltese cross, a lifebuoy

No. 283 Squadron was a Royal Air Force squadron that served during the Second World War in the air-sea rescue (ASR) mission role while flying Supermarine Walruses and both in ASR and the anti-submarine patrol role while flying Vickers Warwicks.

== History ==
No. 283 Squadron was formed at Algiers on 11 February 1943 as an air-sea rescue squadron. The squadron was equipped with the Supermarine Walrus and was responsible for air-sea rescue along the North African coast. The squadron moved to Palermo in August 1943 to provide cover for the campaign in southern Italy. The squadron re-equipped with the Vickers Warwick in February 1944 and moved to Hal Far on Malta. At the end of the Second World War the squadron, still at Hal Far, was disbanded on 31 March 1946.

== Aircraft operated ==
Aircraft operated by No. 283 Squadron
From	To	Aircraft	Version
April 1943	April 1944	Supermarine Walrus	Mks.I & II
March 1944	March 1946	Vickers Warwick	Mk.I

== Squadron bases ==
Bases of No. 283 Squadron
From	To	Name
February 1943	May 1943	Hussein Bay, Algiers
May 1943	May 1943	Maison Blanche
May 1943	May 1943	RAF Tingley
May 1943	August 1943	La Sebala
August 1943	December 1943	Palermo
December 1943	December 1943	Ajaccio, Corsica
December 1943	April 1944	Borgo
April 1944	March 1946	RAF Hal Far, Malta

== See also ==
- List of Royal Air Force aircraft squadrons
