= RAF Matlaske =

Former RAF station in Norfolk, England

RAF Matlaske
- Matlaske, Norfolk in England
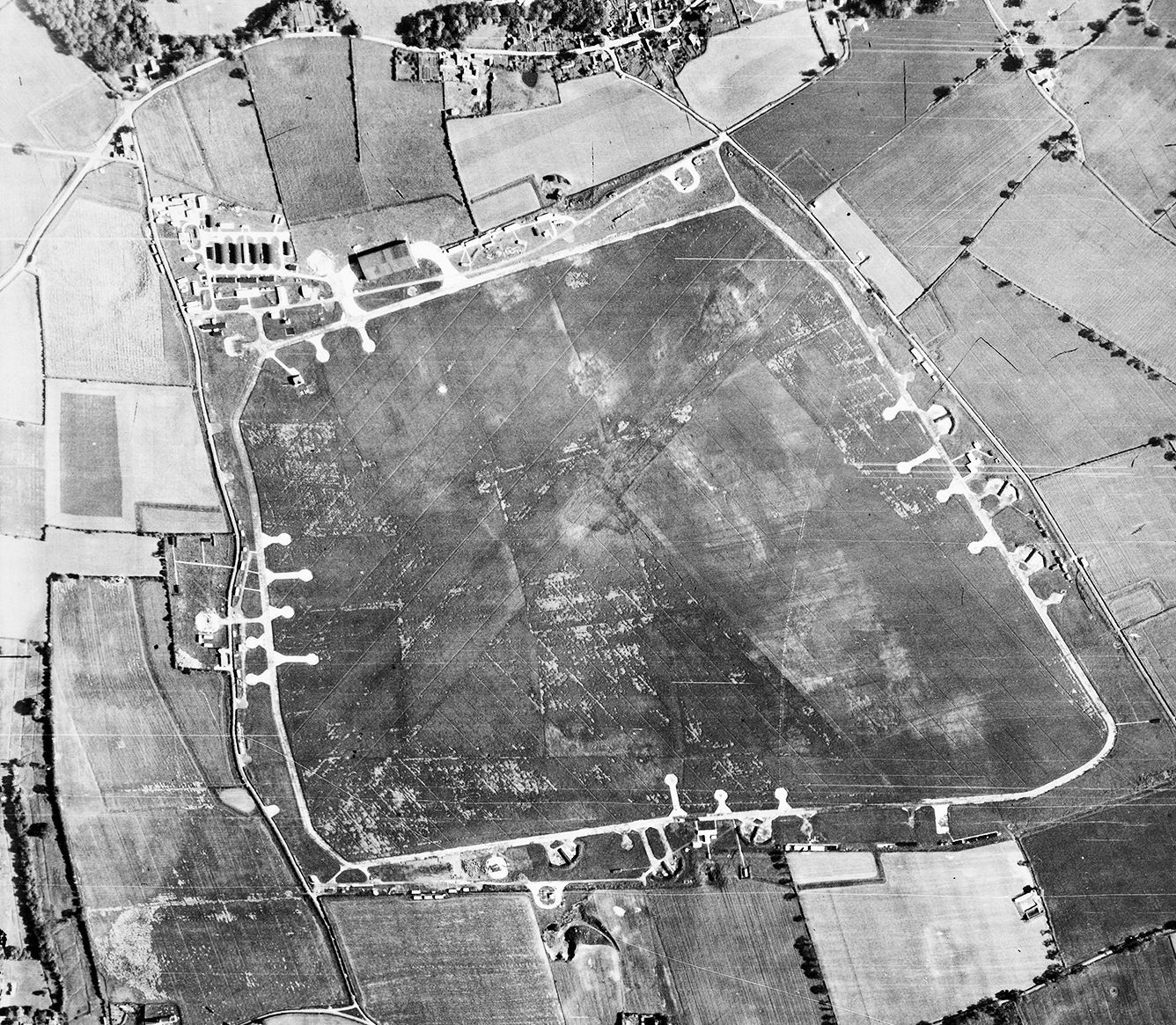
- Aerial photograph of Matlaske airfield looking north, Matlaske village is at the top, 27 June 1946.

Site information
- Type: Royal Air Force satellite station
- Code: MK
- Owner: Air Ministry
- Operator: Royal Air Force; United States Army Air Forces; British Army
- Controlled by: RAF Fighter Command; No. 12 Group RAF; 1940-43 & 1944-45

Location
- Location within Norfolk RAF Matlaske (the United Kingdom)
- Coordinates: 52°51′38″N 001°11′22″E

Site history
- Built: 1940
- In use: October 1940 – October 1945
- Battles/wars: European theatre of World War II

Airfield information
- Elevation: 50 metres (164 ft) AMSL
Runways
Direction	Length and surface
00/00	1,463 metres (4,800 ft) Grass
00/00	1,188 metres (3,898 ft) Grass
00/00	1,188 metres (3,898 ft) Grass

Royal Air Force Matlaske or more simply RAF Matlaske is a former Royal Air Force satellite station to RAF Coltishall, situated near Matlaske in Norfolk, England.

== History ==
There was a small aerodrome, details of which are not known, at Matlaske before the war started, then the site was approved for requisition by the Air Ministry in August 1939, with construction works beginning in the summer of 1940. RAF Matlaske became operational in October 1940 as a satellite station to RAF Coltishall when Spitfires of No. 72 Squadron were briefly dispersed there. The airfield was grass-covered throughout its life and had two main landing runs, of which one was 1,600.00 yards (1,463.04 m) with the other being 1,300.00 yards (1,188.72 m).

=== Luftwaffe attack ===
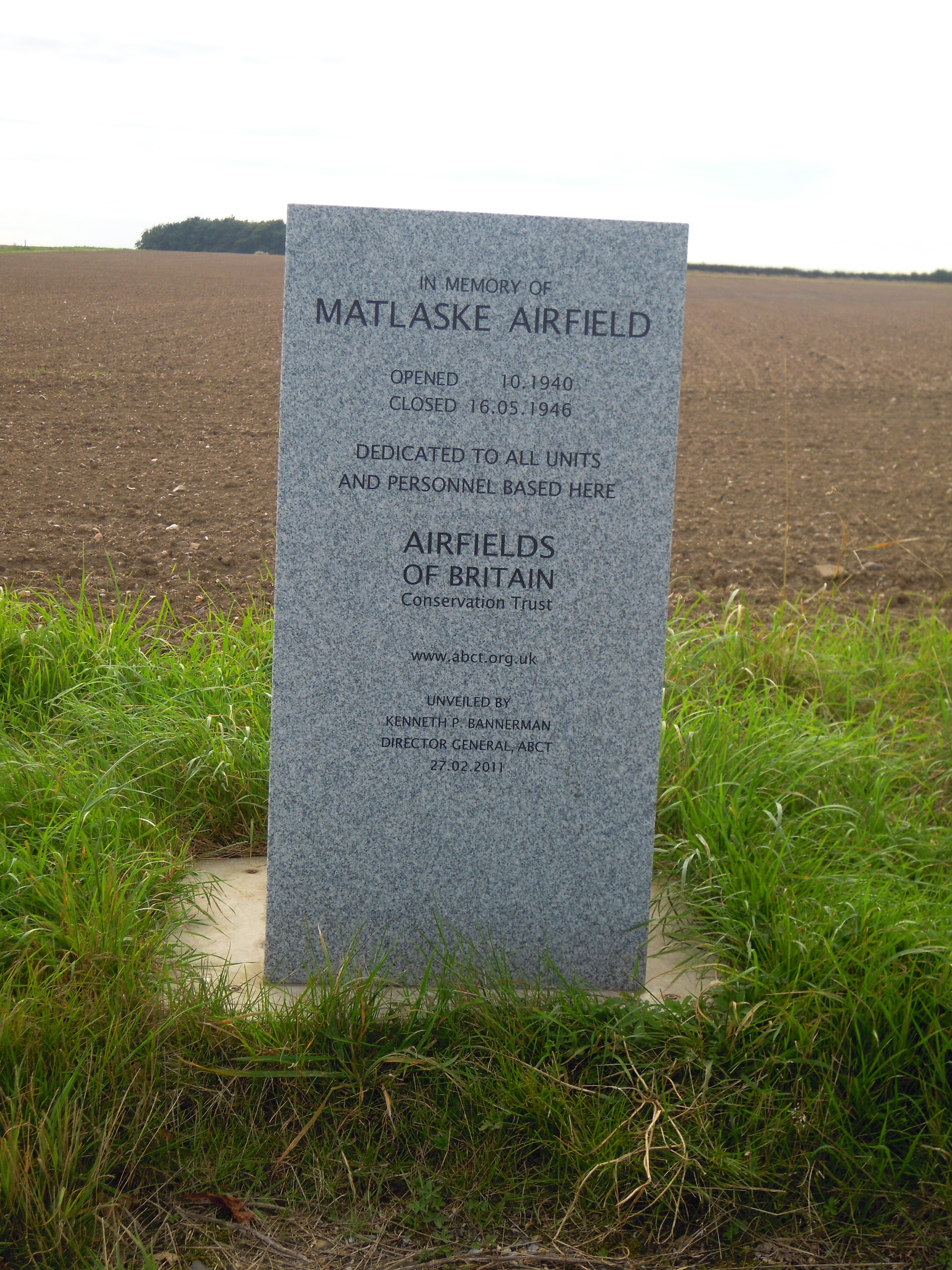
Memorial near the site

On 29 October 1940 the Luftwaffe attacked the airfield at Matlaske. This attack followed the bombing of RAF Coltishall two days before which had necessitated the re-location of some of the Spitfires of 72 Squadron to Matlaske. Five Dornier aircraft carried out the attack, strafing the base and causing damage to parked aircraft as well as inflicting several casualties to personnel. On 12 May 1941 the Luftwaffe attacked the base again but this time they bombed using Incendiary bombs. The attack had limited success with only minor damage caused and no personnel casualties.

=== United States Army Air Force ===
In September 1942, the airfield was allocated to the 8th United States Army Air Forces ostensibly for use as a fighter base by Republic P-47 Thunderbolts of the 56th Fighter Group from RAF Kings Cliffe but nothing is recorded of any use by that unit.

=== Royal Air Force ===
From November 1941 to August 1942 the base was host to No. 137 Squadron, one of only two RAF squadrons to fly the unique twin-engine fighter, the Westland Whirlwind, when it was engaged on East coast convoy patrols and anti-shipping tasks. It was supported by the Air Sea Rescue squadron No. 278, Matlaske-based from October 1941 to April 1942.

Nos. 56, 195, 245, 266 and 609 Squadrons flying Hawker Typhoons, plus Nos. 19, 222, 229, 453, 602 and 611 Squadrons flying the Supermarine Spitfire, and No. 601 Squadron – the only one flying the Hawker Hurricane from here, were based or detached here at various times between October 1940 to April 1945.

From April to May 1943, No. 1489 Flight RAF conducted target towings with Hawker Henleys, Westland Lysanders, M.25 Martinets and M.9 Masters, which were based at RAF Coltishall and RAF Sutton Bridge and detached to Matlaske as required.

In August 1943, the airfield was transferred to Care and Maintenance and the facilities improved. Reopened in September 1944 it was used further by 3, 19, 56, 65, 122, 229, 451, 453, 485, 486 and 602 Squadrons at various times until April 1945, the RAF vacating the site in October 1945.

== Units ==
The following Royal Air Force units served at Matlaske at one point or another during the Second World War:

Royal Air Force

- No. 3 Squadron RAF – Hawker Tempest V
- No. 19 Squadron RAF – Supermarine Spitfire II & Vb
- No. 56 Squadron RAF – Hawker Typhoon 1b, Tempest V
- No. 65 Squadron RAF – NA Mustang iii
- No. 72 Squadron RAF
- No. 122 Squadron RAF – NA Mustang III
- No. 137 Squadron RAF – Famous for its use of the Westland Whirlwind fighter
- No. 195 Squadron RAF – Hawker Typhoon 1b
- No. 222 Squadron RAF – Supermarine Spitfire II
- No. 229 Squadron RAF – Supermarine Spitfire IX
- No. 245 Squadron RAF – Hawker Typhoon 1b
- No. 266 Squadron RAF – Hawker Typhoon 1a
- No. 278 Squadron RAF – Westland Lysander IIIa, Supermarine Walrus II
- No. 486 Squadron RAF – Hawker Tempest V
- No. 601 Squadron RAF – Hawker Hurricane 2b
- No. 602 Squadron RAF – Supermarine Spitfire XVI
- No. 609 Squadron RAF – Hawker Typhoon 1b
- No. 611 Squadron RAF – Supermarine Spitfire IX & Vb
- No. 658 Squadron RAF
- No. 659 Squadron RAF
- No. 12 Group Target Towing Flight RAF
- No. 1489 (Fighter) Gunnery Flight RAF
- No. 1489 (Target Towing) Flight RAF
- No. 2738 Squadron RAF Regiment
- No. 2741 Squadron RAF Regiment
- No. 2765 Squadron RAF Regiment
- No. 2805 Squadron RAF Regiment
- No. 2811 Squadron RAF Regiment
- Air Sea Rescue Flight RAF, Matlaske (1941) became No. 278 Squadron RAF

Royal Australian Air Force

- No. 451 Squadron RAAF
- No. 453 Squadron RAAF Supermarine Spitfire LFXVI

United States Army Air Forces

- 56th Fighter Group (allocated)

== Aircraft ==
The following aircraft types served at the base:

- Supermarine Spitfire
- Hawker Henley
- Hawker Hurricane
- Hawker Tempest
- Hawker Typhoon
- M.9 Master
- M.25 Martinet
- Bell P-39 Airacobra
- Republic P-47 Thunderbolt
- North American Mustang III
- Supermarine Walrus
- Westland Lysander
- Westland Whirlwind
