= No. 292 Squadron RAF =

Air-sea rescue squadron of the Royal Air Force

- Active: 1 February 1944 – 14 June 1945
- Country: United Kingdom
- Branch: Royal Air Force
- Role: Air-sea rescue
- Part of: Air Command, South East Asia

Insignia
- Squadron Badge heraldry: No badge authorised
- Squadron Codes: No code(s) are known to have been used by this squadron

No. 292 Squadron RAF was an air-sea rescue (ASR) squadron of the Royal Air Force operating in the Bay of Bengal during the Second World War.

== History ==
No. 292 Squadron was formed at RAF Jessore, Bengal, (then) British India, on 1 February 1944, as a dedicated air-sea rescue squadron equipped with Walrus flying boats. A detachment of the squadron was sent further south, in Ceylon. In April the squadron received a number of Vickers Warwick patrol aircraft, but these were found to be unsuitable in the tropical climate, and in December 1944 they received Consolidated Liberator Mk.VIs as replacements. In November 1944 the squadron received a number of Supermarine Sea Otters, a more modern flying boat. It was posted to RAF Agartala in February 1945, as operations had shifted further eastwards through Burma; they were located there when the squadron was disbanded on 14 June. Its duties were then taken over by three independent flights, No's 1347, 1348 and 1349 Flights.

== Aircraft operated ==
Aircraft operated by No. 292 Squadron
| From | To | Aircraft | Version |
|---|---|---|---|
| February 1944 | June 1945 | Supermarine Walrus | Mks.I, II |
| April 1944 | June 1945 | Vickers Warwick | ASR.Mk.I (unsuited for tropical climate, non-operational after November 1944) |
| November 1944 | June 1945 | Supermarine Sea Otter | Mk.II |
| December 1944 | June 1945 | Consolidated Liberator | Mk.VI |

== Squadron basesd ==
Camps and airfields used by No. 292 Squadron
| From | To | Airfield | Remark |
|---|---|---|---|
| 1 February 1944 | 5 February 1945 | RAF Jessore, Bengal, British India | Det. at RAF Ratmalana, Ceylon; RAF Sigiriya, Ceylon and RAF Santa Cruz, Maharashtra, British India |
| 5 February 1945 | 14 June 1945 | RAF Agartala, Tripura, British India | Dets. at RAF Kankesanthurai, Ceylon and RAF Chittagong, Bengal, British India |
