= Vickers Warwick =

British multi-purpose twin-engined military aircraft of the Second World War

Warwick
- Warwick B/ASR Mk.I

General information
- Type: Maritime reconnaissance, air-sea rescue, transport
- Manufacturer: Vickers-Armstrongs
- Status: Retired
- Primary users: Royal Air Force South African Air Force; Polish Air Force in exile BOAC
- Number built: 846

History
- First flight: 13 August 1939
- Developed from: Vickers B.9/32

The Vickers Warwick was a British twin-engined bomber aircraft developed and operated during the Second World War that was primarily used in other roles. In line with the naming convention followed by other RAF heavy bombers of the era, it was named after a British city or town, in this case Warwick. The Warwick was the largest British twin-engined aircraft to see use during the Second World War.

The Warwick was designed and manufactured by Vickers-Armstrongs during the late 1930s. It was intended to serve as a larger counterpart to the Vickers Wellington bomber. The two aircraft share similar construction and design principles but development of the Warwick was delayed by a lack of suitable engines. Its first flight was on 13 August 1939, but by the time adequate engines were available, it was obsolete.

The Warwick entered production during 1942 and squadron service with the Royal Air Force (RAF). Barely a dozen aircraft were built as bombers. The type was used by RAF Transport Command as a transport, and by RAF Coastal Command as an air-sea rescue and maritime reconnaissance aircraft. The Warwick was also operated by the Polish Air Forces in exile in Great Britain and the South African Air Force. A civil operator, the British Overseas Airways Corporation (BOAC), also operated a handful of transport Warwicks.

== Design and development ==
=== Origins ===
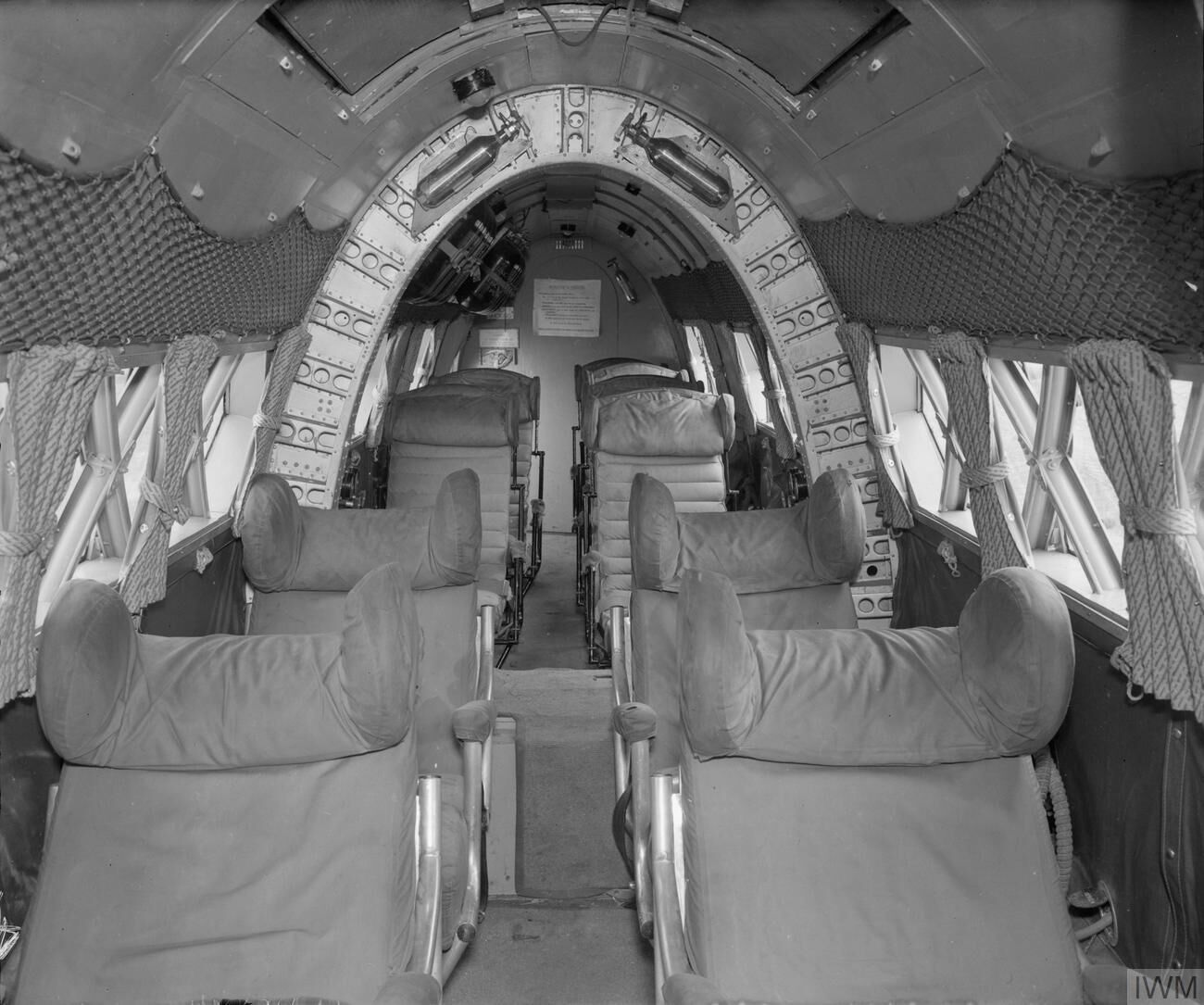
Cabin of passenger transport variant

In October 1932, the British industrial conglomerate Vickers-Armstrongs tendered for the Air Ministry Specification B.9/32, which called for the development of a twin-engined medium bomber. During late 1934, when the company was already developing their Type 271 to meet Specification B.9/32, Vickers received a draft requirement for a larger bomber. The draft specification developed into Air Ministry Specification B.1/35, which sought a twin-engined heavy strategic bomber. It was intended to make use of more powerful engines, of 1,000 hp (750 kW), that were being developed, to enable the bomber to be faster and carry a heavier bomb load than the earlier B.3/34. Among the requirements of Specification B.1/35 was a speed of no less than 195 mph (314 km/h) while flying at 15,000 ft (4,600 m), a range of 1,500 mi (2,400 km) while carrying 2,000 lb (910 kg) of bombs, and the engines were to be furnished with variable-pitch propellers.

It was designed in parallel with the smaller Wellington, both aircraft having been derived from the Vickers Type 271 design, developed for Specification B.9/32. By the end of July 1935, the Air Ministry was considering eight designs. These included Vicker's proposal, the Type 284, powered by a pair of Bristol Hercules engines, which exceeded the specifications. Vickers received an order for a prototype on 7 October 1935, while the Air Ministry also ordered prototypes from Armstrong Whitworth (the AW.39, a development of the Armstrong Whitworth Whitley) and Handley Page (the HP.55). These alternative designs were cancelled before being built, as Handley Page and Armstrong Whitworth switched to work on newer specifications released for medium (P.13/36) and heavy (B.12/36) bombers.

=== Changes and redesigns ===
As Specification B.1/35 was to be a heavier complement to Specification B.9/32, it was initially thought that there would be no need for a mock-up. On 14 March 1936, in light of major design changes being submitted, production of a complete mock-up was authorised. Around the same time, it was decided to allocate the Vickers 284 type number to the project, while the redesigned B.9/32 (which would become the Wellington) became the Vickers 285. As a consequence of the relaxation of the restrictions imposed by the 1932 Geneva Disarmament Conference, the weight of the Vickers 284 and 285 expanded gradually, until the 285 approached the original specified weight for Specification B.1/35.

During 1936, Specification B.1/34 was modified to require the aircraft to carry more fuel and a heavier bombload. During January 1937, the Rolls-Royce Vulture liquid-cooled X engine was named as the alternative powerplant of the Vickers 284 and it was adopted in late 1938. The Vulture, which had also been intended for the rival Avro Manchester, was subsequently determined to be unlikely to be available in sufficient numbers for the Warwick, as well as being unreliable, and on 2 July 1937, an order for a second prototype was placed the Air Ministry as insurance against the failure of the Vulture.

The second prototype (L9704) was designed for the Napier Sabre engine but development was slow, and production capacity was urgently required for the Hawker Typhoon fighter. L9704 was instead fitted with the Bristol Centaurus radial engine. Other aspects of the design proved troublesome, such as the gun turrets and official doubts over the geodetic airframe structure, the latter having been used on several previous designs by British aircraft designer Barnes Wallis.

In February 1939, development beyond the pair of prototypes was cancelled because of difficulties with the Vulture engine but this was reversed the following January. In late June 1939, following the completion of a high-level review and an update of programme data, work resumed. While Vickers chose to continue with the project, official doubts, over slow progress caused by work on the Wellington and the lack of suitable engines, led to a growing official expectation that the design would be surpassed by later aircraft.

=== Into flight ===
On 13 August 1939, the first prototype (serial K8178), powered by Vulture engines, made its first flight from Brooklands, with test pilot Joseph "Mutt" Summers at the controls but the test flight only lasted for a few minutes due to a failed carburettor linkage. The smaller Wellington had flown three years earlier and had already been in production for 18 months by then. When fully equipped, the calculated all-up weight of the first prototype was 42,182 lb (19,133 kg), almost double the weight given by Vickers in their initial tender for the design. Flight tests with the prototype revealed it to be slow, underpowered and unable to maintain altitude on one engine.

The second prototype flew on 5 April 1940 with Centaurus engines and incorporated improvements to its design, such as a re-designed elevator, to improve handling. There was a definite improvement in performance and it was claimed that the second prototype was faster than a Hawker Hurricane, at certain altitudes. While the Centaurus-powered prototype was more promising, development was at an early stage. In October 1939, it was proposed that it be redesigned as a four-engined aircraft, with either Rolls-Royce Merlin XX or Bristol Hercules HE7SM engines but after some study, the idea was discarded as it reduced range and payload.

Another proposal used the American Pratt & Whitney Double Wasp radial engine. Performance projections showed similar performance to the Hercules III-powered Wellington but with a significantly greater payload and the engines were also available due to the cancellation of contracts previously placed by the French. The second prototype was converted to use the R-2800-S14A4-G engines and was flown in July 1941. The Double Wasp installation was inferior to the Centaurus but was ordered regardless.

On 3 January 1941, an initial production order was placed for 250 Warwicks, consisting of 150 Double Wasp-powered Mk.I aircraft and 100 Centaurus-powered Mk.IIs, with deliveries to commence in November that year. It was at this point that the proposed aircraft was officially named in accordance with the Air Ministry's practice of naming bombers after British towns and cities and with Vickers using 'W' as the initial letter to indicate the designs of Barnes Wallis.

=== Production ===
The large initial production contract came despite the need to resolve troubles with the Centaurus engine. The Double Wasp engine, with a three-bladed 15 ft (4.6 m) diameter Hamilton Standard propeller, became the usual powerplant. Due to the time it took for the Double Wasps to reach Vickers in Britain from Pratt & Whitney in the U.S., delays were unavoidable. During 1941, the second prototype flight tested a modified tail to improve handling. The prototype was fitted with production engines and propellers however this revealed problems with engine ignition, which was resolved with a revised booster coil. The Warwick was subject to considerable study to keep it relevant to the rapidly changing circumstances of the conflict, and it was out of this process that a work towards standardised production was made.

Due to persistent engine shortages and a change in policy, only 16 of the planned 150 Warwick bombers were completed. Even as the first bomber was nearing completion at Weybridge, the type was failing to meet Air Staff requirements for bomber aircraft. Bombers were being expected to carry much greater bomb loads further, and a decision had been made to re-equip RAF Bomber Command exclusively with a new generation of four-engine bombers. Just as the earlier, and now obsolescent Wellington was being relegated to secondary roles, the Warwick was used for general reconnaissance (long range anti-submarine patrols), air-sea rescue, operational crew training and as a transport, where its obsolescence did not matter.

By January 1943, 57 Warwick Mk.Is had been completed, when it was decided that they would be used primarily as transports and air-sea rescue aircraft. During mid-1943, a Warwick Mk.I was converted to become the Warwick Mk.II prototype with the principal difference being the installation of Centaurus IV engines. 219 Warwick Mk.I aircraft were completed, with the last 95 of these fitted with 2,000 hp (1,500 kW) R-2800-47 engines.

In 1942, an order for 14 Warwick transports, the Vickers 456 Warwick C.Mk.I was made for British Overseas Airways Corporation (BOAC), a civil operator. Operational requirements were for the carriage of mail, freight and passengers between Bathurst in South Africa and Cairo in Egypt, complementing BOAC's flying boat operations between England and Bathurst. The order was met by converting existing B.Mk.Is, by removing military equipment, fairing over gun turret openings, adding cabin windows, a freight floor, long-range fuel tanks and exhaust stack flame dampers for night flights.

The Warwick used Barnes Wallis' geodetic airframe construction pioneered in the Wellesley. In this system, a network of intersecting structural members made from duralumin were covered by wired-on fabric. The load was distributed across the structure, providing great redundancy in the event of damage, at the expense of complexity of construction.

== Operational history ==
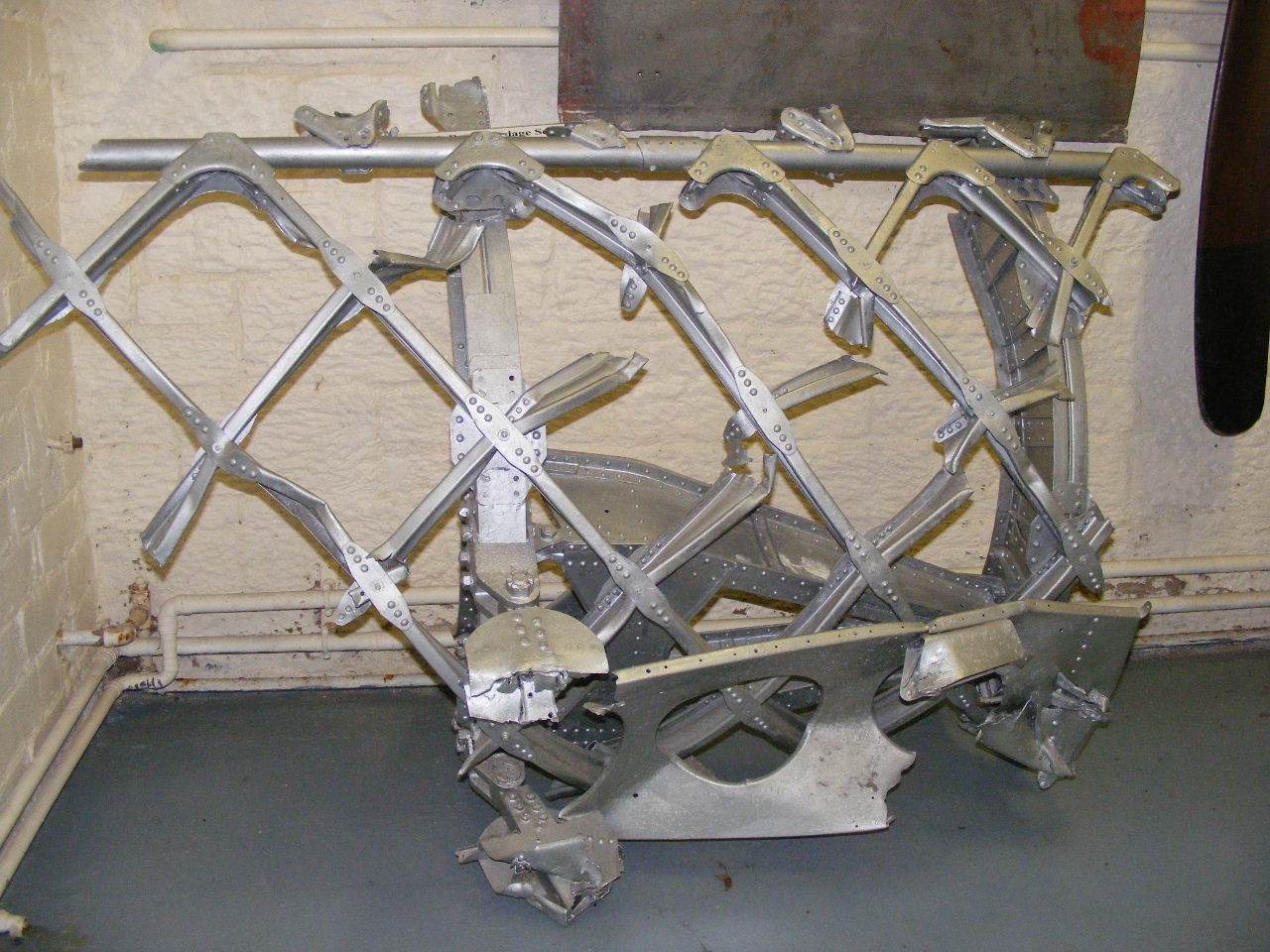
Warwick rear fuselage showing duralumin geodetic construction.

The first production Warwick B Mk.I was delivered to the RAF for testing at the Aeroplane and Armament Experimental Establishment, Boscombe Down on 3 July 1942. This first aircraft was lost when fabric panels on the wings came loose on 28 January 1942. The second production Warwick took its place in flying trials but on 18 February 1943, it too was destroyed, by a fire which began in the starboard engine.

Only 16 aircraft were delivered as bombers, as by this time more capable four-engined heavy bombers such as the Short Stirling and Handley Page Halifax were in service. Those Warwicks that were delivered in the bomber configuration saw little use as such, instead being used to investigate various kinds of equipment and technical matters, including navigational equipment, engine performance, role suitability, and air-dropped lifeboats. It soon became clear that the Warwick, with its spacious fuselage and long range, would be well suited to utility roles. In January 1943, the Air Staff decided that the Warwick would serve as the predominant aircraft for transport and air-sea rescue.

Early testing showed the Warwick to be under-powered and with severe handling problems, especially when flown on one engine. Stability and control trials commenced with the third production Warwick, which yielded acceptable handling during single engine operations when fitted with a triangular extension ahead of the fin. The Double Wasps fitted to early models were unreliable while later versions fitted with the Centaurus engine had better performance but the handling problems were never completely solved.

Warwick BV243 was converted into a transport for trials. An additional 13 Mk.Is were converted on the production line as C Mk.I transports for BOAC. BOAC's Warwicks were used briefly on its Middle East services before being transferred back to RAF Transport Command in 1944. One hundred similar aircraft were built for the RAF as Warwick C Mk.IIIs, and entered service with 525 Squadron in June 1944, with three more squadrons operating the Warwick III. They were mainly used in the Mediterranean theatre, as the vulnerability of the fabric skinning to high temperature and humidity stopped plans to operate the Warwick in the Far East, and remained in use until retired in 1946.

The remainder of the first batch of 250 Warwicks were used by RAF Coastal Command for anti-submarine reconnaissance. From 1943, Warwicks were fitted with the 1,700 lb (770 kg) Mk.IA airborne lifeboat and used for air-sea rescue. The lifeboat, designed by yachtsman Uffa Fox, laden with supplies and powered by two 4 hp (3.0 kW) motors, was aimed with a bomb-sight to be dropped under parachute near ditched air crew from an altitude of about 700 ft (210 m). Warwicks were credited with rescuing crews from a wide variety of contemporary aircraft both in the English Channel and the North Sea.

Only 235 of the production order for 525 Warwick Mk.V were completed, most of which went directly into storage in 1944. In early 1945, some examples of this stored variant was issued to 179 Squadron, stationed at RAF St Eval. Four Warwick GR Mk.Vs crashed on test flights from Brooklands during the first half of 1945. The first of these was PN773 which suffered an engine failure on take-off on 2 January and was skilfully force-landed close to St Mary's Church in Byfleet and was later repaired and flown again. A propeller blade from this 1945 accident survives in the Brooklands Museum collection. The Warwick Mk.V was also operated by 17 and 27 Squadrons of the South African Air Force.

== Variants ==
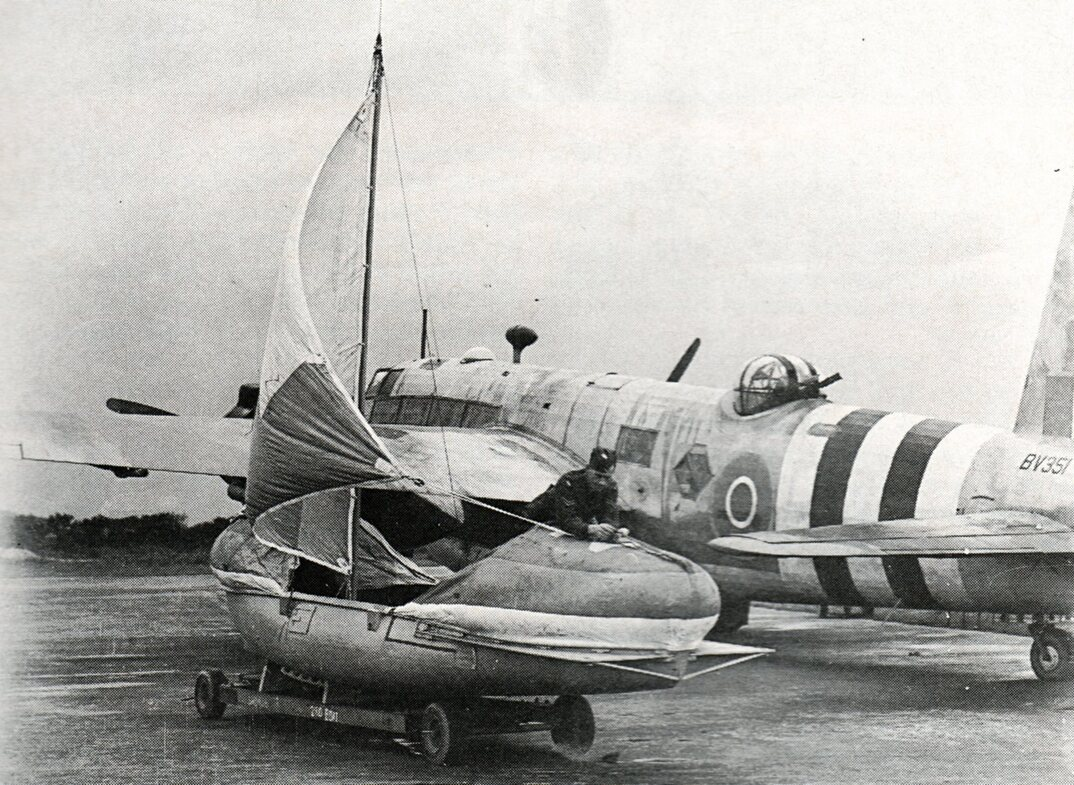
Airborne lifeboat in front of a Warwick with D-Day identification stripes

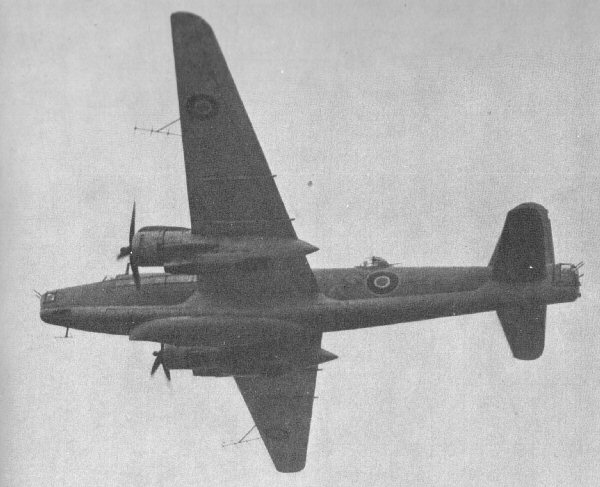
Air-sea rescue Warwick with airborne lifeboat under the fuselage

=== Warwick Mark I ===
- Warwick B Mk.I –; original production bomber, of 150 ordered, only 16 were built. They were used for testing.
- Warwick C Mk.I or Vickers Type 456 –; transport version for BOAC, for its Mediterranean and North African routes. 14 built.
- Warwick B/ASR Mk.I –; 40 aircraft converted from Warwick B Mk.I bombers for air-sea rescue and could carry two sets of Lindholme lifesaving equipment.
- Warwick ASR (Stage A) –; 10 aircraft converted from Warwick B Mk.I bombers for air-sea rescue. They could carry one airborne lifeboat and two sets of Lindholme lifesaving equipment.
- Warwick ASR (Stage B) –; 20 aircraft converted from Warwick B Mk.I bombers as air-sea rescue aircraft, carrying the same equipment as the Warwick ASRs and ASR (Stage As).
- Warwick ASR Mk.I or Vickers Type 462 was an air-sea rescue aircraft carrying an airborne lifeboat that was powered by two 1,850 hp (1,380 kW) Pratt & Whitney Double Wasp R-2800-S1A4G radial piston engines. 205 built.

=== Warwick Mark II ===
- Warwick B Mk.II or Vickers Type 413 –; bomber prototype, only one example built, converted from a Warwick B Mk.I.
- Warwick GR Mk.II or Vickers Type 469 –; anti-submarine, general reconnaissance version. It was equipped to carry torpedoes and bombs. It was powered two 2,500 hp (1,900 kW) Bristol Centaurus VI radial engines. 118 built.
- Warwick GR Mk.II Met –; meteorological reconnaissance version of the Warwick GR Mk.II. 14 built.

=== Warwick Mark III ===
- Warwick C Mk.III or Vickers Type 460 –; unarmed transport. It had a pannier extension below the central fuselage, and the normal loaded weight was raised to 45,000 lb (20,000 kg). It could carry 24 troops or eight to 10 passengers in VIP configuration. 100 built.

=== Warwick Mark V ===
- Warwick GR Mk.V or Vickers Type 474 –; anti-submarine, general reconnaissance aircraft. It was powered by two Bristol Centaurus VII radial engines, armed with 7 303 in (7,696.2 mm) machine guns and could carry 6,000 lb (2,700 kg) of bombs, mines or depth charges. A ventral Leigh light was fitted. The first operational sortie was carried out by 179 Squadron on 4 December 1944. 210 built.

=== Warwick Mark VI ===
- Warwick ASR Mk.VI or Vickers Type 485 –; final air-sea rescue version. The aircraft was powered by two Pratt & Whitney R-2800-2SBG Double Wasp radials. 94 built.

== Operators ==
=== Military operators ===
Poland

- Polish Air Forces in exile in Great Britain
  - No. 301 Polish Bomber Squadron
  - No. 304 Polish Bomber Squadron

South Africa

- South African Air Force
  - 17 Squadron SAAF
  - 27 Squadron SAAF

United Kingdom

- Royal Air Force
  - No. 38 Squadron RAF
  - No. 167 Squadron RAF
  - No. 179 Squadron RAF
  - No. 251 Squadron RAF
  - No. 269 Squadron RAF
  - No. 276 Squadron RAF
  - No. 277 Squadron RAF
  - No. 278 Squadron RAF
  - No. 279 Squadron RAF
  - No. 280 Squadron RAF
  - No. 281 Squadron RAF
  - No. 282 Squadron RAF
  - No. 283 Squadron RAF
  - No. 284 Squadron RAF
  - No. 292 Squadron RAF
  - No. 293 Squadron RAF
  - No. 294 Squadron RAF
  - No. 353 Squadron RAF
  - No. 520 Squadron RAF
  - No. 525 Squadron RAF
  - No. 621 Squadron RAF

=== Civil operators ===
United Kingdom

- BOAC

== Specifications (Warwick ASR Mk.I) ==
Data from Vickers Aircraft since 1908, Vickers-Armstrong Warwick variants

General characteristics

- Crew: six
- Length: 72 ft 3 in (22.02 m)
- Wingspan: 96 ft 8.5 in (29.477 m)
- Height: 18 ft 6 in (5.64 m)
- Wing area: 1,006 sq ft (93.5 m^{2})
- Empty weight: 28,154 lb (12,770 kg)
- Max takeoff weight: 45,000 lb (20,412 kg)
- Powerplant: 2 × Pratt & Whitney R-2800/S.1A4-G "Double Wasp" radial engines, 1,850 hp (1,380 kW) each
- Propellers: Hamilton Standard

Performance

- Maximum speed: 224 mph (360 km/h, 195 kn)
- Range: 2,300 mi (3,700 km, 2,000 nmi)
- Service ceiling: 21,500 ft (6,600 m)
- Rate of climb: 660 ft/min (3.4 m/s)

Armament

- Guns: 8 × .303 in (7.7 mm) Browning machine guns in three turrets

== See also ==
Related development

- Vickers Wellington

Aircraft of comparable role, configuration, and era

- Avro Manchester
- Heinkel He 177

Related lists

- List of aircraft of World War II
- List of bomber aircraft
- List of aircraft of the Royal Air Force
