= No. 293 Squadron RAF =

Former flying squadron of the Royal Air Force

- Active: 28 Nov 1943 – 5 Apr 1946
- Country: United Kingdom
- Branch: Royal Air Force
- Role: air-sea rescue
- Part of: Mediterranean Air Command
- Mottos: Latin: Ex aere salus (Translation: "Safety from the air")

Insignia
- Squadron Badge heraldry: Over waves of the sea, a dexter hand couped at the wrist in bend sinister
- Squadron Codes: ZE (Nov 1943 – Apr 1946)

No. 293 Squadron was a Royal Air Force air-sea rescue squadron. During the Second World War the unit operated search and rescue missions for Allied aircraft operating over Italy.

== History ==
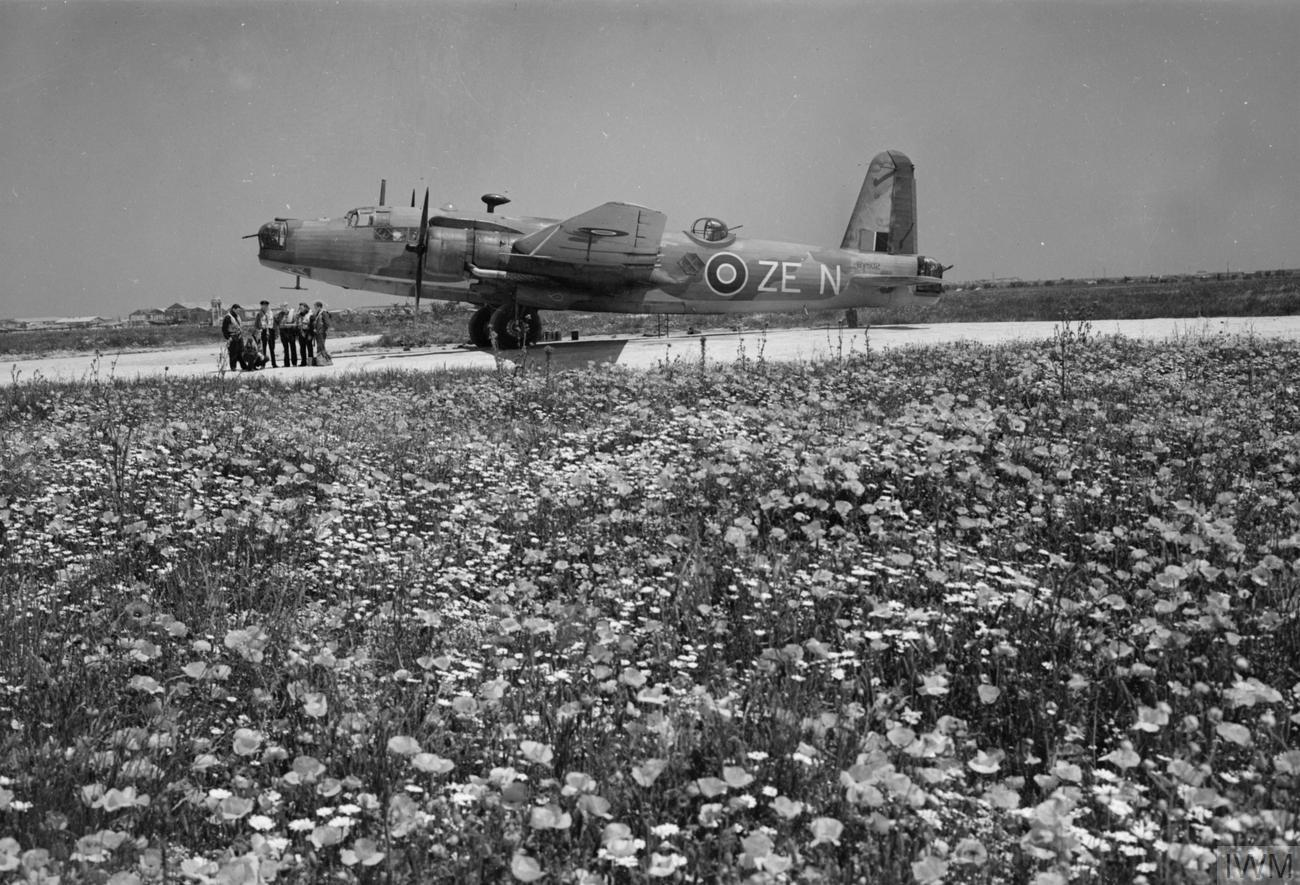
A Vickers Warwick of No. 293 Squadron at Foggia in Italy

No. 293 Squadron was formed at RAF Blida, North Africa on 28 November 1943 with the Vickers Warwick in the air-sea rescue role. After providing detachments into Italy the squadron moved to Pomigliano, Italy in March 1944. In April 1944 the Warwicks were supplemented by Supermarine Walrus flying boats. In March 1945 the squadron moved to Foggia, but moved back to Pomigliano in June where it stayed until it was disbanded on 5 April 1946.

== Aircraft operated ==
Aircraft operated by No. 293 Squadron
From	To	Aircraft	Variant	Notes
November 1943	April 1946	Vickers Warwick	ASR Mk.I	Twin-engined bomber operated in the search and rescue role.
April 1944	April 1946	Supermarine Walrus	Mks.I, II	Single pusher-engined biplane rescue amphibian.

== Squadron bases ==
Bases and airfields used by No. 293 Squadron
From	To	Base	Remark
November 1943	December 1943	RAF Blida, Algeria	
December 1943	March 1944	RAF Bone, Algeria	Det. at Pomigliano, Italy
March 1944	March 1945	Pomigliano, Italy	Dets. all over the Italian coast
March 1945	June 1945	Foggia, Italy	Dets. at Tortoreto, Italy; Udine, Italy and Cesenatico, Italy
June 1945	April 1946	Pomigliano, Italy	

== Commanding officers ==
Officers commanding No. 293 Squadron
From	To	Name
November 1943	October 1944	S/Ldr. R.W. Pye
October 1944	August 1945	S/Ldr. W.R. Gellatly, RNZAF
August 1945	April 1946	S/Ldr. R.J. Cruttenden

== See also ==
- List of Royal Air Force aircraft squadrons
