= No. 278 Squadron RAF =

- Active: 1 October 1941 – 15 October 1945
- Country: United Kingdom
- Branch: Royal Air Force
- Motto(s): Latin: Ex mare ad referiendum (From out of the sea to strike again)

Insignia
- Squadron Badge: A seagull in front of a lifebelt
- Squadron Code: MY (October 1942 – October 1945)

No. 278 Squadron RAF was a Royal Air Force Squadron formed as an air-sea rescue unit in World War II.

== History ==
The squadron formed at RAF Matlaske on 22 December 1941 and was equipped with the Lysander, Walrus and then the Anson. Spitfires were then supplied for spotting downed aircrew. The area of operations of the squadron was the coast of East Anglia and North East England. There were also detachments in Scotland.

The Warwick was operated from April 1944 and the Sea Otter from May 1945. The squadron was disbanded at Thorney Island on 15 October 1945.

== Aircraft operated ==
Aircraft operated by No. 278 Squadron RAF
From	To	Aircraft	Variant
Oct 1941	Feb 1943	Westland Lysander	IIIA
Feb 1943	May 1944	Avro Anson	I
Apr 1944	May 1944	Supermarine Spitfire	IIA
Apr 1944	Jan 1945	Vickers Warwick	I
May 1944	Feb 1945	Supermarine Spitfire	VB
May 1945	Oct 1945	Supermarine Sea Otter	II
