= RNAS Lee-on-Solent =

Former Royal Naval Air Station in Hampshire, England

RNAS Lee-on-Solent; HMS Daedalus; HMS Ariel
- Lee-on-the-Solent, Hampshire in England
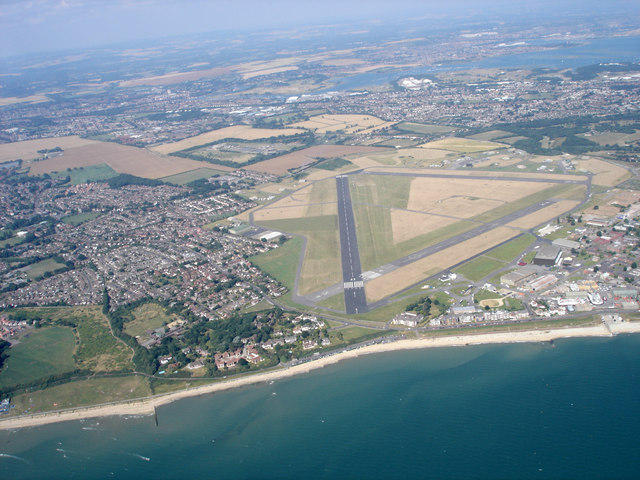
- HMS Daedalus airfield as seen from above the Solent

- HMS Daedalus

Site information
- Type: Royal Naval Air Station
- Code: L
- Owner: Admiralty
- Operator: Royal Navy
- Controlled by: Fleet Air Arm

Location
- Shown within Hampshire RNAS Lee-on-Solent (the United Kingdom)
- Coordinates: 50°48′54″N 001°12′16″W
- Grid reference: grid reference SU560019

Site history
- Built: 1917
- In use: 1917 - 1996
- Fate: general aviation airport
- Battles/wars: European theatre of World War II; Cold War

Airfield information
- Elevation: 9 metres (30 ft) AMSL
Runways
Direction	Length and surface
00/18	975 yards (892 m) Asphalt
06/24	1,420 yards (1,298 m) Asphalt
11/29	1,100 yards (1,006 m) Asphalt
00/18	2,950 yards (2,697 m) Waterway
06/24	2,800 yards (2,560 m) Waterway
11/29	2,000 yards (1,829 m) Waterway
- Source: Royal Navy Research Archive

Royal Naval Air Station Lee-on-Solent, more commonly known as RNAS Lee-on-Solent; (commissioned as HMS Daedalus 1939–1959 & 1965–1996 and HMS Ariel 1959–1965), is a former Royal Naval Air Station located near Lee-on-the-Solent in Hampshire, approximately 4 miles (6.44 km) west of Portsmouth, on the coast of the Solent. The airfield is now mostly civilian, however is still used by HM Coastguard; flying the AgustaWestland AW139 helicopters.

It was one of the primary shore airfields of the Fleet Air Arm and was first established as a seaplane base in 1917 during the First World War. The aerodrome being opened in 1934, it commissioned as HMS Daedalus on 24 May 1939, the day administrative control of the Fleet Air Arm was transferred to the Admiralty from the Royal Air Force and one of the four airfields in the UK that were transferred to the Fleet Air Arm. Many first line squadrons were formed here and it facilitated reserve aircraft storage. During the Second World War it was home to the office of the Admiral (Air) and was the main depot for Naval Air Ratings. In October 1959, it recommissioned as HMS Ariel as a ground training establishment. It again became HMS Daedalus in October 1965, and routine service flying continued until April 1993, including a helicopter SAR Flight of 772 Naval Air Squadron, the Southampton University Air Squadron and the Hampshire Police Air Support Unit. All RN Air Engineering training was conducted at Lee-on-Solent from September 1970.

As well as the flying and AE training tasks, a number of technical and administration sections were based at Lee-on-Solent, including the Fleet Air Arm Drafting Authority, Naval Aircrew Advisory Board, Naval Air Technical Evaluation Centre, Naval Aircraft Maintenance Development Unit, Naval Air Trials Installation Unit, Mobile Aircraft Repair Transport and Salvage Unit, Safety Equipment School, Photographic School. The airfield closed for military use in 1996 and passed through several owners until 2014 when Fareham Borough Council bought the airfield and re-branded it as Solent Airport Daedalus. It hosts the Solent Enterprise Zone.

The airfield is situated 4 miles (6.44 km) north west of the entrance to Portsmouth Harbour. Lee-on-the-Solent adjoins along the south east boundary, with the town of Gosport 2.5 miles (4.02 km) east and the port city of Southampton 8 miles (12.87 km) north west.

== History ==
=== Royal Naval Air Service (1917–1918) ===
Naval aviation began at Lee-on-Solent on 30 July 1917 when the Royal Naval Air Service (RNAS) opened the Naval Seaplane Training School as an extension to the seaplane training station at nearby Calshot (under 5 miles across Southampton Water by seaplane, but over 30 miles by the shortest land route). The school's first commander was Squadron Commander Douglas Evill. Initially, aircraft had to be transported from their temporary hangars to the top of the nearby cliff, then lowered by crane onto a trolley which ran on rails into the sea. Permanent hangars, workshops, accommodation and a new double slipway were soon constructed, however.

=== Royal Air Force (1918–1939) ===
On 1 April 1918, the RNAS combined with the Royal Flying Corps (RFC) to form the Royal Air Force (RAF) and the Lee-on-Solent Naval Seaplane Training School became an RAF station. Naval aviation training continued throughout the 1920s under the RAF with both Calshot and Lee-on-Solent providing training in operating seaplanes - initially using the wartime Short Type 184s and, from late 1921, the new Fairey IIID. On 1 April 1924, the Fleet Air Arm of the Royal Air Force was formed, encompassing those RAF units that normally embarked on aircraft carriers and fighting ships (including those at shore bases such as Lee-on-Solent).

In 1931, the first grass airstrip at Lee was constructed to the west of the town, Lee-on-Solent became HQ RAF Coastal Area, and a major rebuilding programme ensued. On 14 July 1936, an expanded RAF Coastal Area became RAF Coastal Command, with the HQ remaining at Lee-on-Solent.

==== RAF Lee-on-Solent Station Flight ====
The Royal Air Force Station Flight at Lee-on-Solent was equipped with various aircraft over different periods, from 1918 to 1939.

- Hawker Audax (K2349), a Hawker Hart variant, designed for army cooperation
- Fairey Seal (K4225), a British carrier-borne spotter-reconnaissance aircraft
- Supermarine Walrus (K4797), a British single-engine amphibious biplane
- Fairey Swordfish I (K5948), a biplane torpedo bomber
- Fairey Seafox I (K8578), a reconnaissance floatplane
- Blackburn Shark III (K8904), a carrier-borne torpedo bomber
- Hawker Hart (K3838), a British two-seater biplane light bomber aircraft
- Miles Magister (N5436), a two-seat monoplane basic trainer aircraft

=== Royal Navy (1939–1996) ===
With the expansion of the RAF during the 1930s, however, Parliament decided that the Fleet Air Arm should transfer to the Admiralty. Four airfields in the United Kingdom were transferred over to the Fleet Air Arm, these were the air stations at Donibristle, Lee-on-Solent, Ford, and Worthy Down. As a consequence, on 24 May 1939, HQ RAF Coastal Command moved to Northwood and Lee-on-Solent was commissioned as HMS Daedalus. It became the headquarters of Rear Admiral, Naval Air Stations, Richard Bell Davies. Captain T Bulteel was the first Royal Navy station commander of Lee-on-Solent and took up post the following day on 25 May 1939. The first two units to take up residence at HMS Daedalus, on 24 May, 765 Naval Air Squadron, as a Basic Seaplane Training and Pool Squadron. It was initially equipped with Supermarine Walrus amphibian aircraft and, Fairey Seafox and Fairey Swordfish Seaplane aircraft. The squadron trained pilots in operating seaplane aircraft and provided a pilot reserve for Fleet Air Arm catapult squadrons. The other unit was 771 Naval Air Squadron, formed out of a fleet requirements unit, with a northern 'X' flight and southern 'Y' flight, equipped with Fairey Swordfish torpedo bomber and Supermarine Walrus.

753 and 754 Naval Air Squadrons also formed on 24 May 1939, out of the disbanded RAF unit, the School of Naval Co-operation RAF, which had itself formed at Lee-on-Solent in 1919. 753 NAS operated Blackburn Shark torpedo-spotter-reconnaissance biplane and Fairey Seal spotter-reconnaissance biplane. 754 NAS used Supermarine Walrus amphibian and Fairey Seafox floatplane along with Percival Vega Gull military trainer aircraft. May 1939 also saw the construction commence of concrete runways begin thus making RNAS Lee-on-Solent one of the early airbases to move away from grass airstrips. The two runways in question: heading 13/31 and 2,250 feet (690 m) in length and heading 24/06 with a length of 3,000 feet (910 m). Later on, in August, 710 Naval Air Squadron formed. This was a seaplane squadron with six Supermarine Walrus for the seaplane tender HMS Albatross.

==== Second World War (1939–1945) ====
At the outbreak of the Second World War more Fleet Air Arm second line squadrons either formed or deployed at Lee-on-Solent, 772 Naval Air Squadron formed out of 'Y' Flight of 771 Naval Air Squadron, as a Fleet Requirements Unit, equipped with four Fairey Swordfish Floatplanes. At the same time a Service Trials Unit was stood up, with 778 Naval Air Squadron tasked with testing aircraft and armament, and assessing tactics, it operated with Blackburn Roc and Skua, along with Fairey Swordfish and Supermarine Walrus at HMS Daedalus and adding Fairey Albacore and Fulmar soon afterwards. In November the Deck Landing Training unit 770 Naval Air Squadron formed with a variety of aircraft, using de Havilland Moth, Gloster Sea Gladiator, Blackburn Skua and Fairey Swordfish.

A Communications Squadron was formed in March 1940, 781 Naval Air Squadron. It was equipped with a variety of aircraft including de Havilland Hornet Moth, Fairey Fulmar, Fairey Swordfish and Supermarine Walrus. 764 Naval Air Squadron was formed in April 1940 as an Advance Seaplane Training Squadron. It was equipped with Supermarine Walrus amphibian aircraft, and Fairey Seafox and Fairey Swordfish floatplanes. When the trainees had passed the conversion course at Lee-on Solent they boarded the Seaplane carrier, HMS Pegasus, for catapult training. The squadron left HMS Daedalus for RAF Pembroke Dock on 3 July 1940, leaving behind its Seafox floatplanes.

763 Naval Air Squadron, Torpedo, Spotter, Reconnaissance Pool No.1, arrived at HMS Daedalus from RNAS Jersey at the end of May 1940. (The Admiralty had taken over Jersey Airport, to use as a Naval air station. However, due to the German occupation of France and the proximity to the Channel Islands, the Government concluded the Islands weren't defendable). The squadron remained at Lee-on-Solent for around one month before moving to RNAS Worthy Down in July.

Four Bellman hangars were initially erected at HMS Daedalus, but on 16 August 1940 the Luftwaffe attacked the airbase and caused considerable damage. In the air raid by Junkers Ju 88 multirole combat aircraft and Messerschmitt Bf 110 fighter bomber aircraft, a number of people were killed and several buildings were seriously damaged, including destroying two of the Bellman hangars.

780 Naval Air Squadron arrived at HMS Daedalus from RNAS Eastleigh in October. This unit provided a conversion course tasked with training experienced civilian pilots in naval flying. It operated a variety of aircraft, including Blackburn Shark, de Havilland Gipsy Moth, de Havilland Hornet Moth, de Havilland Tiger Moth, Fairey Swordfish, Hawker Hart, Hawker Nimrod, Percival Proctor, and Percival Vega Gull. Then at the end of 1940 702 Naval Air Squadron reformed at Lee-on-Solent as a Long Range catapult squadron, operating with Fairey Seafox from armed merchant cruisers, with its shore-base being HMS Daedalus.

Improvements to the airbase were ongoing during the next three years. Additional land was acquired and a third runway was constructed. The existing shorter runway was re-aligned and extended, and by 1942 the lengths, width and orientation were: 18/00 975 yards (892 m), 24/06 1,420 yards (1,300 m) and 11/29 1,100 yards (1,000 m), all by 50 yards (46 m) wide. Construction of dispersal hangars also continued over the same period. There was eventually eight Fromson-Massillion hangars with a footprint measuring 70 yards (64 m) x 60 yards (55 m), these were hangars designated F, H, L, M, N, O, P and R. They were augmented with eleven hangars by A&J Main & Co Ltd, their footprint was identical to the fromson type, but had slightly lower doors. These hangars were designated A, B, C, D, E, G, J, K, Q, T and U. The original Watch Office was damaged during the August 1940 attack by the Luftwaffe’ and a new Admiralty designed control tower was constructed to replace it. By the middle of the Second World War the airbase had the capacity for five first line and three second line squadrons, at any one time.

809 Naval Air Squadron formed at Lee-on-Solent, on 15 January 1941, as a fleet fighter squadron, equipped with Fairey Fulmar Il aircraft. The squadron worked-up for embarkation on HMS Victorious, but prior to this left HMS Daedalus after three months and moved to Gosport in March. In July 811 Naval Air Squadron reformed at Lee-on-Solent. Tasked as a torpedo bomber reconnaissance squadron, it was initially equipped with two Hawker Sea Hurricane fighter aircraft and two Vought SB2U Vindicator, an American carrier-based dive bomber which was known as the Chesapeake in Royal Navy service. Working up for deployment on escort carriers, it soon replaced its initial aircraft with six Fairey Swordfish.

825 Naval Air Squadron reformed on New Year’s Day 1942, at Lee-on-Solent, as a Torpedo Bomber Reconnaissance squadron with nine Fairey Swordfish. Six aircraft were detached to RAF Manston ready for the break out of the German battlecruisers Scharnhorst and Gneisenau. On 12 February 1942, the detachment attacked the battlecruisers in poor weather and failing light. All six aircraft were lost and only five of the eighteen aircrew survived. The CO, Lieutenant Commander Eugene Esmonde, was awarded a posthumous Victoria Cross. The unit regrouped at Lee-on-Solent, on 2 March 1942, again equipped with Fairey Swordfish Il, before later moving to RNAS Machrihanish (HMS Landrail). Later in the same year 746 Naval Air Squadron formed as the Naval Night Fighter Interception Unit, during November 1942, at Lee-on-Solent. It initially operated with six Fairey Fulmar reconnaissance / fighter aircraft, three as night fighter aircraft with the other three as the target aircraft. December saw the unit move to RAF Ford to join the RAF Fighter Interception Unit.

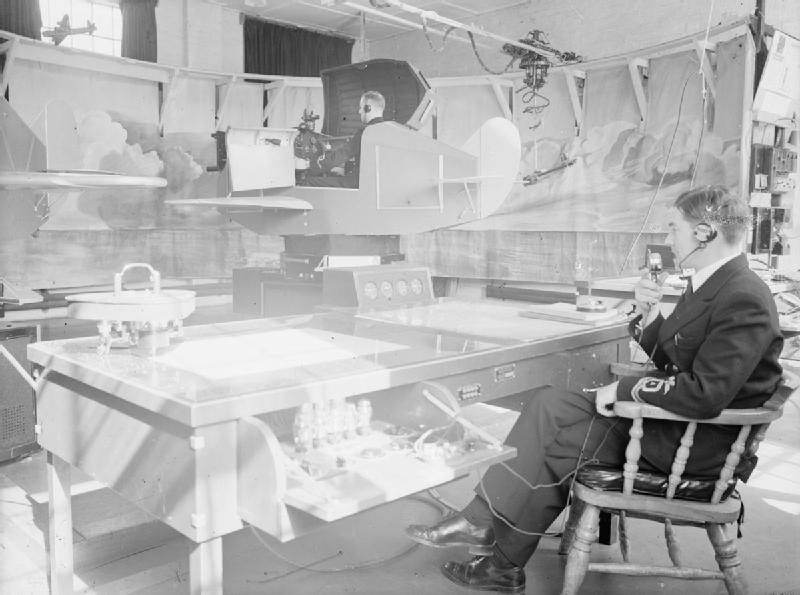
The Link trainer in action at the RNAS Lee-on-Solent. Pilots receive their first training in blind flying

739 Naval Air Squadron formed on 15 December 1942 at Lee-On-Solent. It was designated as the Blind Approach Development Unit. Its first commanding officer was Lieutenant G. Smith, RN, and its initial equipment was a single Fairey Swordfish alongside one Fairey Fulmar for trials work. The squadron later acquired Airspeed Oxford, a twin-engine monoplane training aircraft and Avro Anson, a British twin-engine, multi-role aircraft. The unit left Lee-on-Solent nine months after forming, moving to RNAS Worthy Down (HMS Kestrel) on 1 September 1943.

1944 saw an increase in activity at HMS Daedalus especially in the build up to Operation Overlord and the Normandy Landings. Both Fleet Air Arm and Royal Air Force squadrons operated out of Lee-on-Solent, supported by a RAF Hawker Typhoon flight and a United States Navy artillery observer aircraft squadron, equipped with Supermarine Spitfire, a British single-seat fighter aircraft. The 3rd Naval Fighter Wing had formed in October 1943, consisting three Supermarine Seafire, a navalised Spitfire, equipped squadrons: Nos 808, 886 and 897 Naval Air Squadrons. The wing arrived at Lee-on-Solent on 25 February 1944 and added 885 Naval Air Squadron, which had just reformed again on 15 February, to its formation. Its role altered to that of an air spotting pool supporting the RAF Second Tactical Air Force for the Normandy landings.

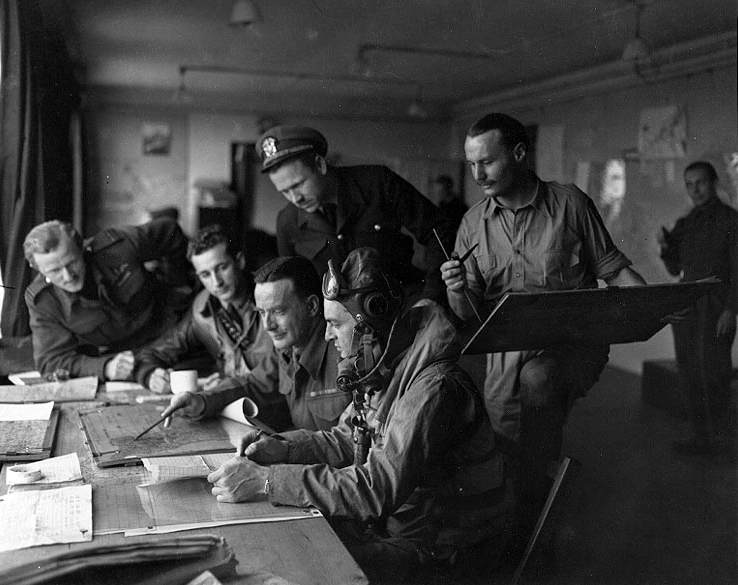
US Navy pilots are briefed before flying a gunfire spotting mission over the Normandy beach heads

They were joined by United States Navy’s VCS-7 artillery observation aircraft squadron, on 28 May 1944. For Operation Neptune seventeen pilots from the United States Navy’s cruiser and battleship observation units were trained to fly Supermarine Spitfire Vb fighter aircraft and Cruiser Scouting Squadron (VCS) 7 was formed. No. 26 Squadron arrived at Lee-on-Solent at the end of April, operating with Supermarine Spitfire Vb and was joined by the Supermarine Spitfire Va aircraft of No. 63 Squadron at the end of May and the British single-seat fighter-bomber Hawker Typhoon Ib equipped, No. 1320 ('Abdullah') Flight. Together with No. 268 Squadron, equipped with North American Mustang II an American long-range, single-seat fighter and No. 414 Squadron RCAF operating North American Mustang I, this mixture of units formed the Air Spotting Pool, operated by No. 34 Reconnaissance Wing, of the RAF Second Tactical Air Force.

On 6 June 1944, at 0441 hours, the first allied aircraft to take part in Operation Overlord took off from HMS Daedalus. The Air Spotting Pool operated as pairs with one aircraft covering against an air attack while the other aircraft provided aerial spotting for naval gunfire support. A large number of aircraft was required for this work because of the need to maintain aircraft over the beaches used for the invasion but with aircraft that had a limited endurance. The number of sorties from HMS Daedalus in support of Operation Neptune was 435 and this was the highest total achieved by any UK airfield on D-Day.

==== HMS Ariel (1959–1965) ====
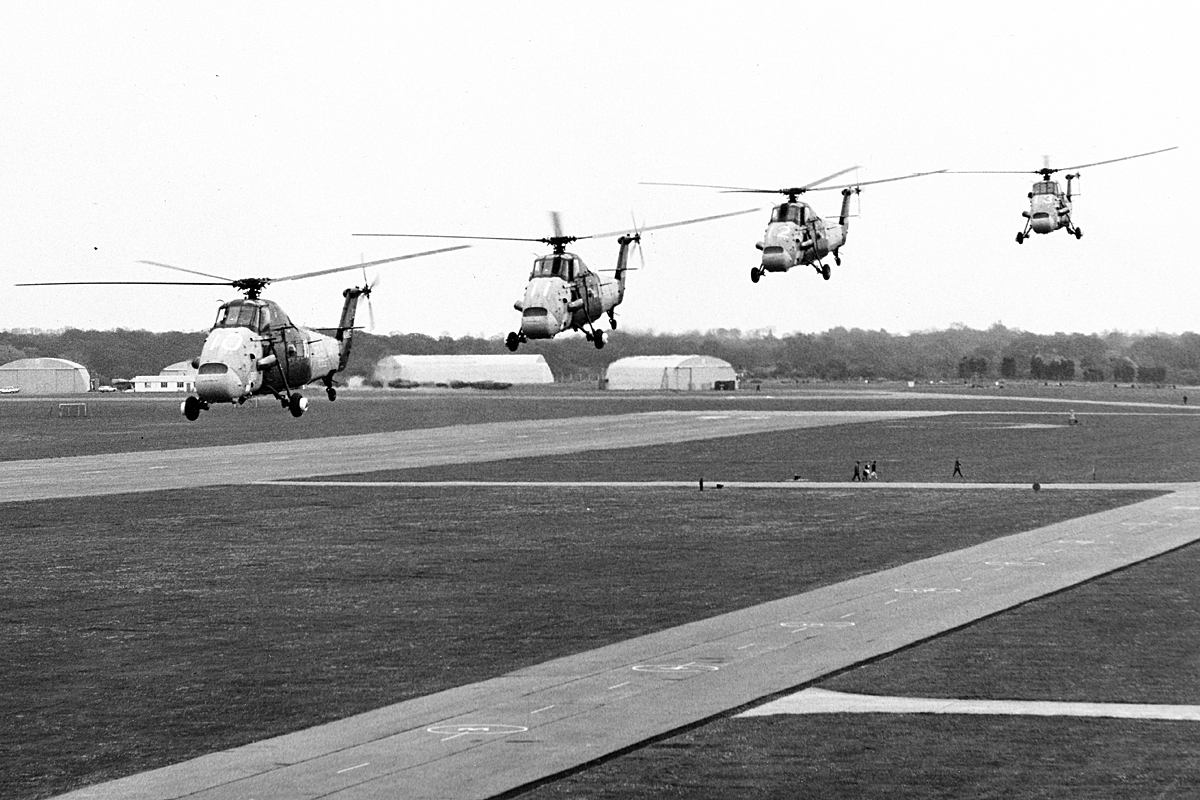
4 SAR Flight Wessex airborne at once for a flypast of the Lee Tower. Westland Wessex HU.5, 781 Squadron, Lee-On-Solent SAR Flight. 1980.

Post-war she continued to play a significant role, being renamed HMS Ariel on 31 October 1959 to reflect her electrical, radar and ground training emphasis; she took over the work of the Royal Naval Air Electrical Training Establishment, Worthy Down prior to its closure in 1961. In 1962 the Joint Service Hovercraft Unit was formed with the aim of testing hovercraft in an operational military environment, and soon after the Air Station reverted to the name HMS Daedalus on 5 October 1965.

She was home to the Naval Air Trial Installation Unit (NATIU), formed to install and test new systems in a variety of flying test bed aircraft including a Hawker Hunter and a de Havilland Devon.

==== Search and Rescue Flight ====
During the Second World War the search and rescue (SAR) duties at Lee-on-Solent were carried out by the Search and Rescue Flight of 781 Naval Air Squadron, which used Supermarine Sea Otter amphibious aircraft. This operation continued until October 1952 when the Sea Otter aircraft were withdrawn.

The Fleet Air Arm operated a separate helicopter Search and Rescue (SAR) Flight at RNAS Lee-on-Solent which formed in November 1972. This effectively replaced the disbanded Royal Air Force SAR Flight at RAF Thorney Island, from 12 February 1973. There was a need to provide a civil Search And Rescue service at 15 minutes' notice, from dawn to dusk, covering from Beachy Head in East Sussex to Start Point, Devon, tasked by the Department of Trade and Industry.

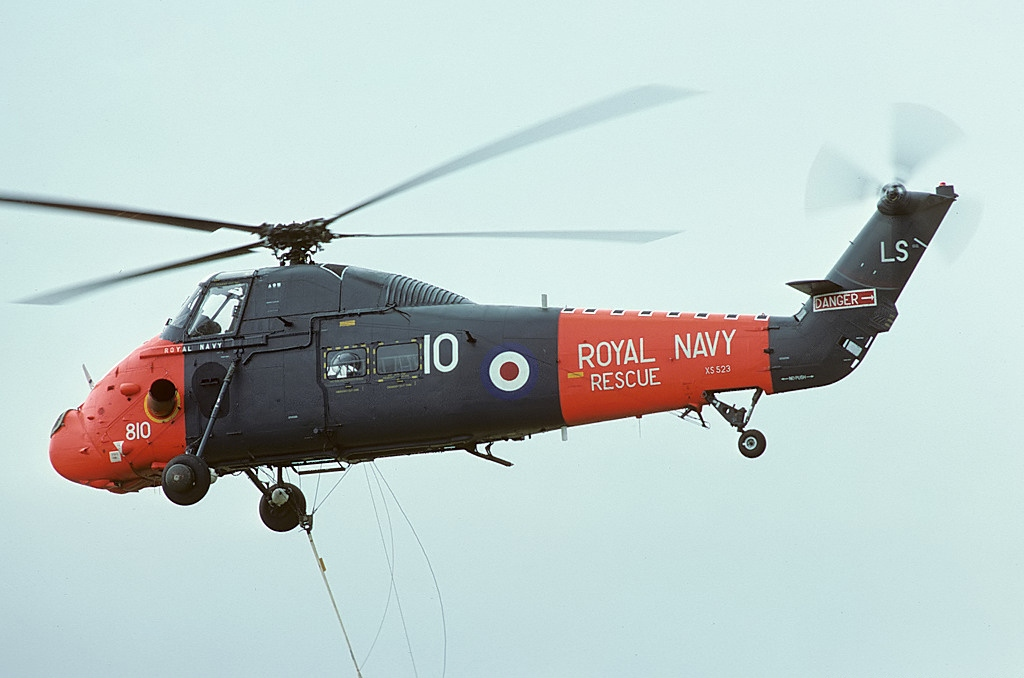
Westland Wessex HU5 (WS-58) of the RNAS Lee-on-Solent SAR flight

The flight was not in use from April 1982, but from February 1983, 772 Naval Air Squadron at RNAS Portland (HMS Osprey), operated a detachment at HMS Daedalus: 'C' Flight, covering SAR, which became and independent unit from August 1985 until March 1988. (replaced temporarily by No. 22 Sqn detachment, followed by civilian coastguard helicopter). It flew a couple of different helicopter types:

- Westland Whirlwind HAR.9 (November 1972 - March 1977)
- Westland Wessex HU.5 (April 1977 - March 1982), (February 1983 - March 1988)

==== RNAS Lee-on-Solent Station Flight ====
The Royal Navy Station Flight at Lee-on-Solent was equipped with various aircraft over different periods, from 1944 to 1959.

- Supermarine Walrus (K8564), a British single-engine amphibious biplane - (Oct - Dec 1944)
- de Havilland Tiger Moth (BB698), a British biplane military trainer - (Feb - Sep 1945)
- Hawker Sea Fury FB.11 (VX282), a British single-engine fighter bomber - (Mar - Jun 1950)
- Boulton Paul Sea Balliol T.21 (WL721), a monoplane advanced trainer aircraft - (Nov 1956 - Dec 1958)
- de Havilland Sea Vampire T.22 (XG768), a British jet fighter aircraft - (Apr 1957 - Jul 1959)
- Percival Sea Prince T.1 (WF127), a British light transport aircraft - (Jul 1957 - Sep 1959)

== Previous units and aircraft ==
List of past flying units and major non-flying units based at Lee-on-Solent, for both the Royal Air Force and the Royal Navy's Fleet Air Arm.

Both RAF Coastal Area and RAF Coastal Command were located here at times.

=== Squadrons ===
The following units were here at some point:

- 700 Naval Air Squadron
- 701 Naval Air Squadron
- 702 Naval Air Squadron
- 703 Naval Air Squadron
- 705 Naval Air Squadron
- 708 Naval Air Squadron
- 710 Naval Air Squadron
- 712 Naval Air Squadron
- 716 Naval Air Squadron
- 728C Naval Air Squadron
- 739 Naval Air Squadron
- 746 Naval Air Squadron
- 752 Naval Air Squadron
- 753 Naval Air Squadron
- 754 Naval Air Squadron
- 760 Naval Air Squadron
- 763 Naval Air Squadron
- 764 Naval Air Squadron
- 765 Naval Air Squadron
- 770 Naval Air Squadron
- 771 Naval Air Squadron
- 772 Naval Air Squadron
- 773 Naval Air Squadron
- 776 Naval Air Squadron
- 778 Naval Air Squadron
- 780 Naval Air Squadron
- 781 Naval Air Squadron
- 782 Naval Air Squadron
- 783 Naval Air Squadron
- 784 Naval Air Squadron
- 793 Naval Air Squadron
- 798 Naval Air Squadron
- 799 Naval Air Squadron
- 800 Naval Air Squadron
- 801 Naval Air Squadron
- 802 Naval Air Squadron
- 803 Naval Air Squadron
- 804 Naval Air Squadron
- 805 Naval Air Squadron
- 807 Naval Air Squadron
- 808 Naval Air Squadron
- 809 Naval Air Squadron
- 810 Naval Air Squadron
- 811 Naval Air Squadron
- 812 Naval Air Squadron
- 813 Naval Air Squadron
- 814 Naval Air Squadron
- 815 Naval Air Squadron
- 816 Naval Air Squadron
- 817 Naval Air Squadron
- 818 Naval Air Squadron
- 819 Naval Air Squadron
- 820 Naval Air Squadron
- 821 Naval Air Squadron
- 822 Naval Air Squadron
- 823 Naval Air Squadron
- 824 Naval Air Squadron
- 825 Naval Air Squadron
- 826 Naval Air Squadron
- 827 Naval Air Squadron
- 828 Naval Air Squadron
- 829 Naval Air Squadron
- 830 Naval Air Squadron
- 831 Naval Air Squadron
- 832 Naval Air Squadron
- 833 Naval Air Squadron
- 835 Naval Air Squadron
- 836 Naval Air Squadron
- 837 Naval Air Squadron
- 841 Naval Air Squadron
- 842 Naval Air Squadron
- 845 Naval Air Squadron
- 847 Naval Air Squadron
- 848 Naval Air Squadron
- 849 Naval Air Squadron
- 850 Naval Air Squadron
- 854 Naval Air Squadron
- 855 Naval Air Squadron
- 878 Naval Air Squadron
- 881 Naval Air Squadron
- 884 Naval Air Squadron
- 885 Naval Air Squadron
- 886 Naval Air Squadron
- 887 Naval Air Squadron
- 888 Naval Air Squadron
- 891 Naval Air Squadron
- 892 Naval Air Squadron
- 894 Naval Air Squadron
- 895 Naval Air Squadron
- 897 Naval Air Squadron
- 1700 Naval Air Squadron
- 1701 Naval Air Squadron
- 1702 Naval Air Squadron
- 1703 Naval Air Squadron
- 1791 Naval Air Squadron
- 1792 Naval Air Squadron
- 1831 Naval Air Squadron

=== Units ===
- Naval Air Radio Installation Unit
- 3rd Naval Fighter Wing
- 20th Carrier Air Group
- 51st Miscellaneous Air Group
- No. 1 Gunnery Co-operation Flight RAF
- No. 2 Anti-Aircraft Co-operation Unit RAF
- No. 10 Group RAF
- No. 15 (General Reconnaissance) Group RAF
- No. 16 (Reconnaissance) Group RAF
- No. 16 Squadron RAF
- No. 17 Group Communications Flight RAF
- No. 17 (Training) Group RAF
- No. 18 (Reconnaissance) Group RAF
- No. 26 Squadron RAF
- No. 42 Squadron RAF
- No. 63 Squadron RAF
- No. 202 Squadron RAF
- No. 209 Training Depot Station RAF
- No. 407 (Fleet Fighter) Flight RAF
- No. 407 (Fleet Reconnaissance) Flight RAF
- No. 440 (Fleet Reconnaissance) Flight RAF
- No. 441 (Fleet Reconnaissance) Flight RAF
- No. 441 (Fleet Spotter Reconnaissance) Flight RAF
- No. 442 (Fleet Reconnaissance) Flight RAF
- No. 443 (Fleet Spotter Reconnaissance) Flight RAF
- No. 444 (Fleet Reconnaissance) Flight RAF
- No. 444 (Fleet Spotter Reconnaissance) Flight RAF
- No. 445 (Fleet Spotter Reconnaissance) Flight RAF
- No. 700H Flight
- No. 701 (Catapult) Flight RAF
- No. 716 (Catapult) Flight RAF
- No. 1320 ('Abdullah') Flight RAF
- Fleet Requirements Unit RAF
- Floatplane Training Flight RAF
- RAF & Naval Co-operation School
- RAF Seaplane Establishment
- School of Naval Co-operation RAF
- School of Naval Co-operation and Aerial Navigation RAF
- School of RAF and Naval Co-operation and Navigation RAF
- Seaplane Club RAF
- Seaplane Training School RAF
- Seaplane Training Squadron RAF
- Southampton University Air Squadron
- VCS-7

== Solent Airport Daedalus (2015–present) ==
Since 2015 the site is now Solent Airport Daedalus

== See also ==
- Calshot Naval Air Station
- List of former Royal Air Force stations
- List of air stations of the Royal Navy
- RNAS Kingsnorth
