= 716 Naval Air Squadron =

Inactive flying squadron of the Royal Navy's Fleet Air Arm

716 Naval Air Squadron ~~716 (Catapult) Flight FAA~~
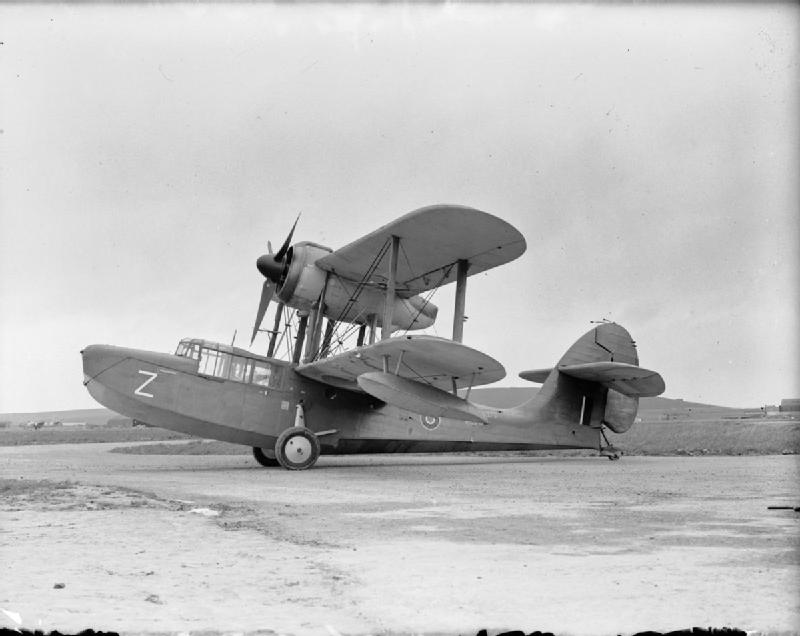
- Supermarine Sea Otter; an example of the type used by 716 NAS
- Active: Royal Air Force; 1936–1939; Royal Navy: 1939–1940; 1944–1945
- Disbanded: 1 September 1945
- Country: United Kingdom
- Branch: Royal Navy
- Type: Fleet Air Arm Second Line Squadron
- Role: Catapult Flight; Safety Equipment School support
- Size: Squadron
- Part of: Fleet Air Arm
- Home station: See Naval air stations section for full list.

Insignia
- Identification Markings: uncoded (Seafox); L9A+ (Seafox May 1939); I0A+ (Sea Otter)

Aircraft flown
- Bomber: Vickers Wellington
- Patrol: Supermarine Walrus; Supermarine Sea Otter
- Reconnaissance: Hawker Osprey; Fairey Seafox

716 Naval Air Squadron (716 NAS), also called 716 Squadron, is an inactive Fleet Air Arm (FAA) naval air squadron of the United Kingdom’s Royal Navy (RN). The squadron was last operational between June 1944 and January 1945 at RNAS Eastleigh, (HMS Raven), located near Southampton, and was designated as the School of Safety Equipment. It operated Supermarine Sea Otter aircraft and a Vickers Wellington to facilitate training in search and rescue operations. A detachment was briefly deployed aboard the lead ship of her class of escort carrier HMS Ruler.

716 (Catapult) Flight was established in July 1936, originating from a segment of 443 (Catapult) Flight, designated for the vessels of the 6th Cruiser Squadron within the South Africa Station. Initially equipped with Hawker Osprey aircraft, the unit transitioned to operating Fairey Seafox aircraft, utilising Simonstown, South Africa, as its shore base at the onset of the Second World War. However, in 1940, it was amalgamated into 700 Naval Air Squadron.

== History ==
=== Catapult Flight (1936–1940) ===
No. 716 (Catapult) Flight, FAA, formed on 15 July 1936 at RAF Mount Batten, a Seaplane Station and flying boat base in Plymouth Sound, Devon, England, from part of No. 443 (Fleet Reconnaissance) Flight FAA.

It was for ships of the 6th Cruiser Squadron in the South Africa Station. Initially equipped with Hawker Osprey floatplane, a biplane designed for spotting and reconnaissance, which was used in the Leander-class cruiser, HMS Amphion. However, starting in October 1937, with the arrival of sister ship HMS Neptune, these aircraft were gradually supplanted by Fairey Seafox floatplane, another reconnaissance biplane. During operations in Home waters, RAF Mount Batten served as the shore base until it was succeeded by RAF Lee-on-Solent, Hampshire, England, in January 1938. Additionally, Simonstown, South Africa, functioned as a seaplane base.

The Flight conducted comprehensive reconnaissance missions from HMS Amphion, monitoring British interests near Tenerife during the initial phases of the Spanish Civil War. Later, in late 1939, operations were transferred to HMS Neptune, where the Flight focused on identifying blockade runners near Freetown.

On 21 January 1940, 716 Naval Air Squadron was integrated into 700 Naval Air Squadron; however, the Flight that was embarked continued to function autonomously for an additional four months.

=== Safety Equipment School (1944-1945) ===
On 28 June 1944, the 716 Naval Air Squadron was re-established at RNAS Eastleigh (HMS Raven), Hampshire, England. The squadron was outfitted with several Supermarine Sea Otter aircraft, an amphibious air-sea rescue type, as well as a minimum of one Vickers Wellington, a twin-engine medium bomber designed for long-range missions. The primary focus of the squadron was to conduct developmental activities for the School of Safety Equipment.

The unit delivered training on Air Sea Rescue operations utilising a detached Flight stationed at RNAS Lee-on-Solent (HMS Daedalus), (previously RAF Lee-on-Solent), to support the formation of the 1700-series Supermarine Sea Otter squadrons, for the British Pacific Fleet. In January 1945, a detachment from the squadron was assigned to HMS Ruler, the lead ship of her class of escort carrier, at Greenock for a brief period.

The disbandment of 716 Naval Air Squadron occurred in September 1945; however, the Air Sea Rescue Flight continued to operate as an independent unit until November.

== Aircraft flown ==
716 Naval Air Squadron operated a number of different aircraft types:

- Hawker Osprey IV/FP fighter and reconnaissance aircraft (July 1936 - February 1938)
- Fairey Seafox ship-borne reconnaissance seaplane (October 1937 - January 1940)
- Supermarine Sea Otter ABR.I amphibious Air-Sea rescue aircraft (July 1944 - August 1945)
- Supermarine Walrus amphibious maritime patrol aircraft (June - August 1939)
- Vickers Wellington GR Mark XI maritime general reconnaissance aircraft (July 1944 - August 1945)

== Naval air stations ==
716 Naval Air Squadron operated from a couple of naval air station of the Royal Navy and a couple of Royal Air Force stations, in the United Kingdom and other locations overseas:

1936 - 1940

- Royal Air Force Mount Batten, Devon, (15 July 1936 - 1 January 1938)
- Simonstown, Cape Town, South Africa, (1936-39)
- Royal Air Force Lee-on-Solent, Hampshire, (1 January 1938 - 21 January 1940)
  - Dakar, Senegal, (Detachments 1939)
- disbanded - (21 January 1940)

1944 - 1945

- Royal Naval Air Station Eastleigh (HMS Raven), Hampshire, (28 June 1944 - 1 September 1944)
  - HMS Ruler (Detachment January 1945)
- Royal Naval Air Station Lee-on-Solent (HMS Daedalus), Hampshire, (Air Sea Rescue Training Flight 10 March 1945 - )
- disbanded - (1 September 1945)

== Ships' Flights ==
List of Royal Navy Leander-class cruisers where responsibility for the aircraft belonged to 716 Flight, between 1936 and 1940:

- HMS Amphion 1936-38
- HMS Neptune 1937-40

== Commanding officers ==
List of commanding officers of 716 Naval Air Squadron with date of appointment:

1936 - 1940

- Lieutenant F.E.C. Judd, RN, (Flight Lieutenant, RAF), from 15 July 1936
- Lieutenant M.W. Watson, RN, (Flight Lieutenant, RAF), from 25 April 1938
- Lieutenant A.J.T. Roe, RN, from 24 May 1939
- disbanded - 21 January 1940

1944 - 1945

- Lieutenant Commander J.F. Nicholas, RN, from 28 June 1944
- Lieutenant Commander(A) D.V. Robinson, RNVR, from 11 May 1945
- disbanded - 1 September 1945

Note: Abbreviation (A) signifies Air Branch of the RN or RNVR.
