= 712 Naval Air Squadron =

Inactive flying squadron of the Royal Navy's Fleet Air Arm

712 Naval Air Squadron ~~712 (Catapult) Flight FAA~~
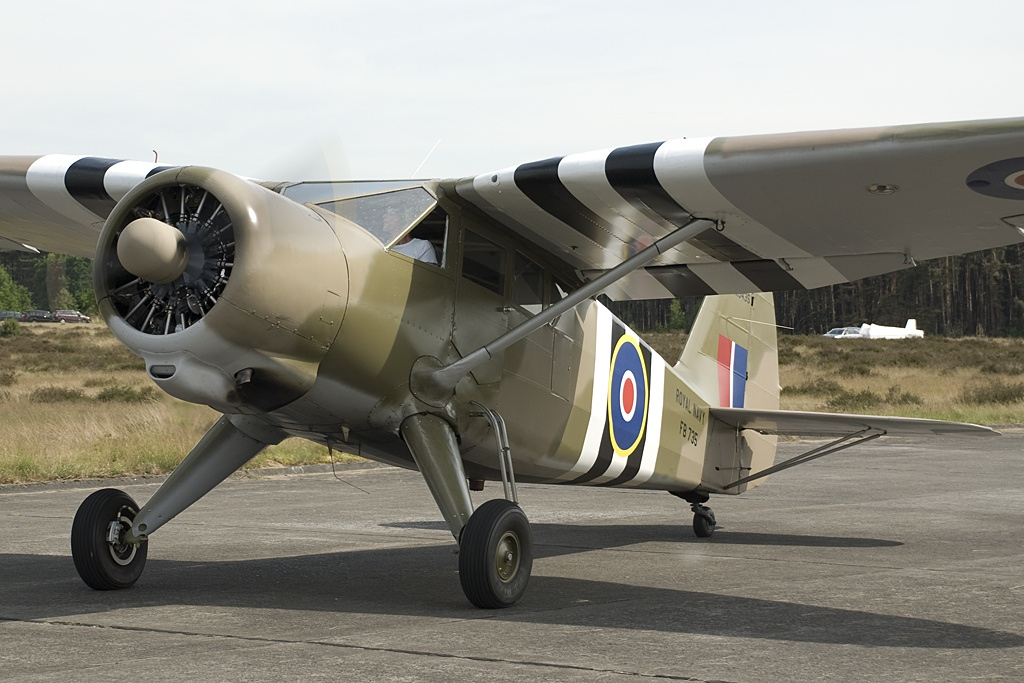
- Stinson Reliant of the type used by 712 NAS
- Active: Royal Air Force; 1936–1939; Royal Navy: 1939–1940; 1944–1945
- Disbanded: 23 August 1945
- Country: United Kingdom
- Branch: Royal Navy
- Type: Fleet Air Arm Second Line Squadron
- Role: Catapult Flight; Communications Squadron
- Size: Squadron
- Part of: Fleet Air Arm
- Home station: See Naval air stations section for full list.
- Aircraft: See Aircraft flown section for full list.

Insignia
- Identification Markings: 034 (Osprey); 34-42, 147 (Walrus); G9A+ (Walrus May 1939); H9A+ or uncoded (all types 1944-45)

712 Naval Air Squadron (712 NAS), also known as 712 Squadron, is an inactive Fleet Air Arm (FAA) naval air squadron of the United Kingdom's Royal Navy (RN). It was initially established as a (Catapult) Flight in 1936, before being upgraded to squadron status in 1938. It was charged with operating Supermarine Walrus seaplanes for the cruisers HMS Glasgow, HMS Newcastle, HMS Sheffield and HMS Southampton, which all commissioned during 1937.

Assigned to the Humber Force and the 18th Cruiser Squadron at the start of the Second World War, the group totalled nine vessels with eighteen Supermarine Walrus aircraft. However, in January 1940, it combined with 700 Naval Air Squadron.

It was reformed at HMS Sparrowhawk, RNAS Hatston, Orkney, in August 1944, as a Communications Squadron, taking 'B' flight from 771 Naval Air Squadron. The aircraft used were Stinson Reliant, Supermarine Sea Otter, and Beech Traveller. The squadron was disbanded in August 1945.

== History ==
=== Catapult flight / squadron (1936-1940) ===
712 Naval Air Squadron can trace its roots back to 1927 when 407 (Fleet Fighter) Flight, FAA, of the Royal Air Force was formed on 1 September 1927 at Royal Air Force Donibristle, Fife, Scotland. 712 (Catapult) Flight, FAA, formed on 15 July 1936 at Royal Air Force Mount Batten, a Seaplane Station and flying boat base in Plymouth Sound, Devon, England. It operated Hawker Osprey III, a two-seat fleet spotter and reconnaissance biplane and Supermarine Walrus, an amphibious maritime patrol aircraft, by redesignating 407 (Fleet Fighter) Flight, FAA.

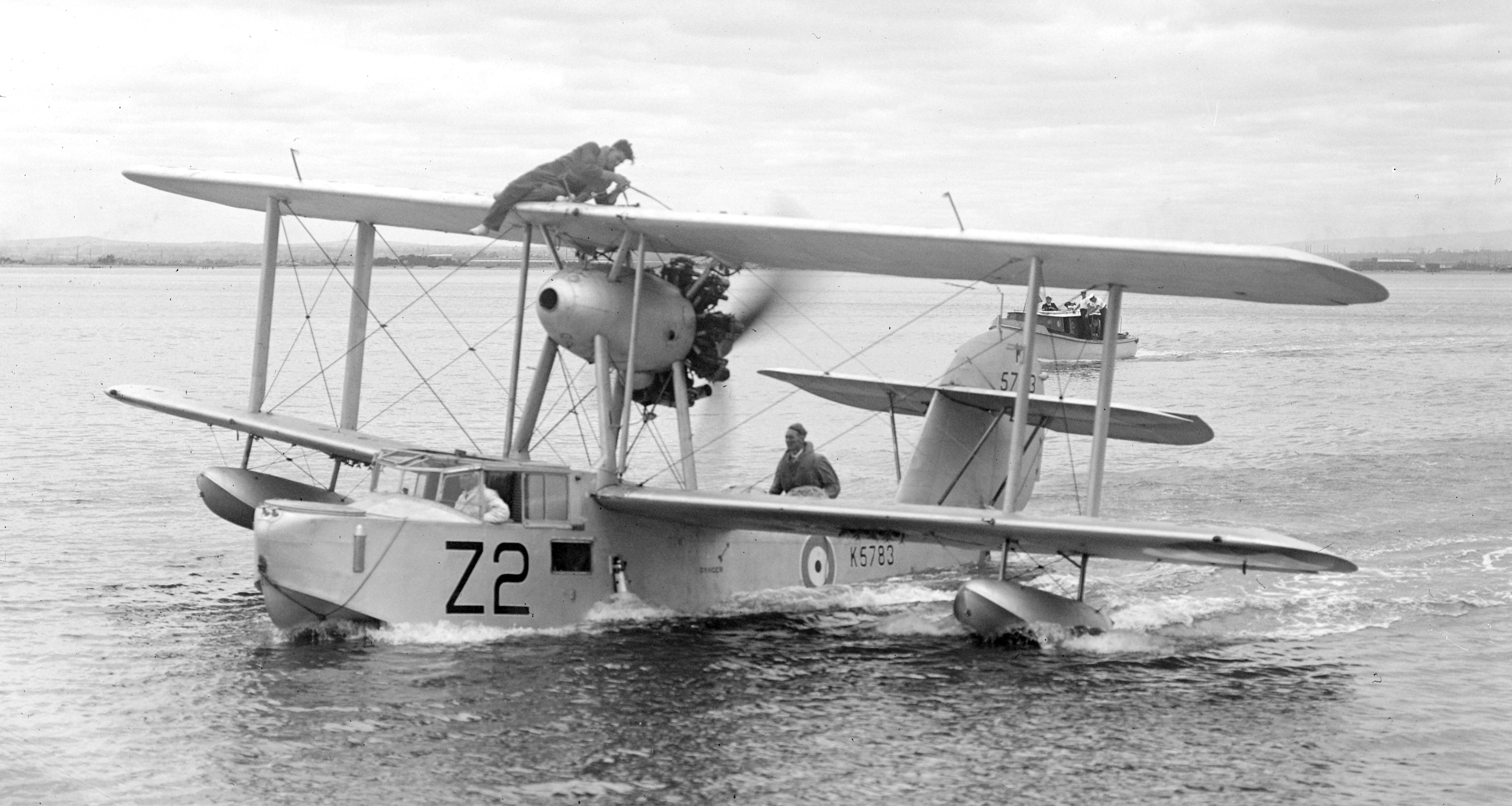
Supermarine Walrus; an example of the type used by 712 Squadron

The unit was established to serve aboard vessels of the Royal Navy's 2nd Cruiser Squadron within the Home Fleet. The Hawker Osprey aircraft were deployed the lead ship HMS Leander along with sister ships HMS Neptune and HMS Orion all between 1936 and 1937. Later the responsibility for the aircraft on these ships was assigned to 718 Flight, while 712 Flight assumed responsibility for the aircraft for the Town-class cruisers: HMS Glasgow, HMS Newcastle and HMS Sheffield all between 1937 and 1940, all of which were commissioned in 1937, then later briefly the County-class cruiser, HMS Cornwall between 1938 and 1939 and the Town-class cruiser, HMS Southampton between 1938 and 1940. In January 1938, the shore base was relocated to Royal Air Force Lee-on-Solent, Hampshire. The Flight disbanded at Lee-on-Solent on 24 May 1939 to become 712 Squadron, FAA.

712 Naval Air Squadron was allocated to the Humber Force and the 18th Cruiser Squadron at the onset of the Second World War. This assignment included notable vessels such as HMS Belfast, HMS Edinburgh, HMS Norfolk, and HMS Suffolk, contributing to a total of nine ships. The squadron operated eighteen Supermarine Walrus aircraft before it was disbanded and subsequently merged into 700 Naval Air Squadron in January 1940.

=== Communications squadron (1944-1945) ===
On 2 August 1944, the 712 Naval Air Squadron was reestablished at RNAS Hatston (HMS Sparrowhawk) located on the Mainland, Orkney, functioning as a Communications Squadron. This formation was derived from 'B' Flight of 771 Naval Air Squadron and was equipped with aircraft including the Supermarine Sea Otter, an amphibious air-sea rescue aircraft, Beech Traveller, a utility aircraft and Stinson Reliant, a liaison and training. The squadron ultimately disbanded at RNAS Hatston in August 1945.

== Aircraft flown ==
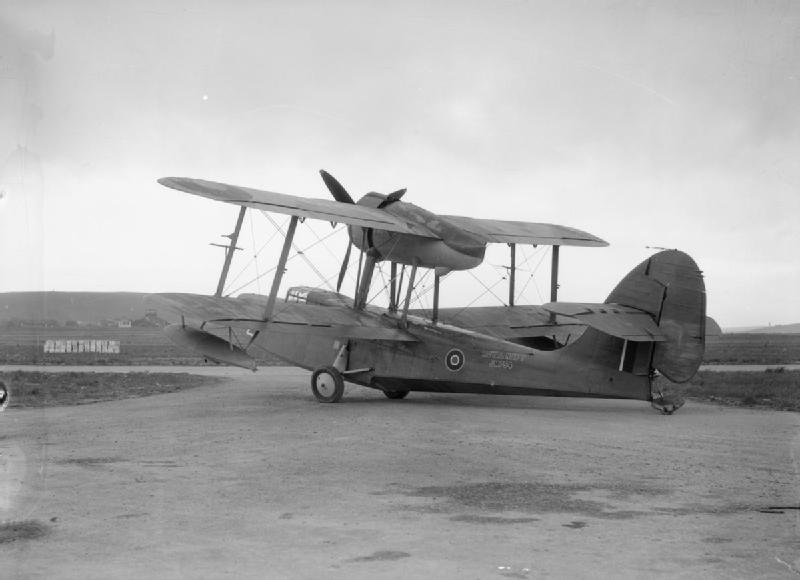
Supermarine Sea Otter ABR.I

712 Naval Air Squadron operated a number of different aircraft types:

- Hawker Osprey FP fleet spotter and reconnaissance biplane (July 1936 - June 1937)
- Supermarine Walrus amphibious maritime patrol aircraft (April 1937 - January 1940)
- Stinson Reliant liaison and training aircraft (August 1944 - August 1945)
- Supermarine Sea Otter ABR.I amphibious air-sea rescue aircraft August 1944 - August 1945)
- Beech Traveller utility aircraft (August 1944 - August 1945)

== Naval air stations ==
712 Naval Air Squadron operated from a couple of naval air station of the Royal Navy and Royal Air Force stations, in the United Kingdom:

1936 - 1940

- Royal Air Force Mount Batten, Devon, (15 July 1936 - 1 January 1938)
- Royal Air Force Lee-on-Solent (Royal Naval Air Station Lee-on-Solent (HMS Daedalus) from 24 May 1939), Hampshire, (1 January 1938 - 21 January 1940)
- disbanded - (21 January 1940)

1944 - 1945

- Royal Naval Air Station Hatston (HMS Sparrowhawk), Mainland, Orkney, (2 August 1944 - 23 August 1945)
- disbanded - (23 August 1945)

== Ships' Flights ==
List of Royal Navy ships where responsibility for the aircraft belonged to 712 Flight, between 1936 and 1940:

- HMS Leander (1936–1937)
- HMS Neptune (1936–1937)
- HMS Orion (1936–1937)
- HMS Glasgow (1937–1940)
- HMS Newcastle (1937–1940)
- HMS Sheffield (1937–1940)
- HMS Cornwall (1938–1939)
- HMS Southampton (1938–1940)
- HMS Belfast (1939–1940)
- HMS Cumberland (1939–1940)
- HMS Edinburgh (1939–1940)
- HMS Norfolk (1939–1940)
- HMS Suffolk (1939–1940)

== Commanding officers ==
List of commanding officers of 712 Naval Air Squadron with date of appointment:

1936 - 1940

- Lieutenant Commander H.A. Traill, RN, (Flight Lieutenant, RAF), from 15 July 1936
- Lieutenant Commander J.C. Richards, RN, (Flight Lieutenant, RAF), from 5 August 1936
- Lieutenant G.D. Anderson, RN, (Flight Lieutenant, RAF), from 5 October 1936
- Lieutenant Commander O.S. Stevinson, RN, (Flight Lieutenant, RAF), from 8 February 1937
- Lieutenant Commander E.H. Shattock, RN, (Squadron Leader, RAF), from 3 April 1937 (Commander 31 December 1938)
- Lieutenant Commander R.E. Gunston, RN, from 20 May 1939
- Lieutenant Commander G.A. Tilney, RN, from 24 May 1939
- disbanded - 21 January 1940

1944 -1945

- Lieutenant(A) J.U. Reid, RNVR, from 2 August 1944
- Lieutenant(A) R.W.M. Williams, RNZNVR, from 27 March 1945
- disbanded - 23 August 1945

Note: Abbreviation (A) signifies Air Branch of the RN or RNVR.
