= 1703 Naval Air Squadron =

Inactive flying squadron of the Royal Navy's Fleet Air Arm

- Squadron Badge (Wartime unofficial)
- Active: 1945
- Disbanded: 18 September 1945
- Country: United Kingdom
- Branch: Royal Navy
- Type: Amphibian Bomber Reconnaissance Squadron
- Role: Air Sea Rescue
- Size: six aircraft
- Part of: Fleet Air Arm
- Home station: RNAS Lee-on-Solent
- Motto: Elephanti Albi! (White elephant! - unofficial)

Commanders
- Notable commanders: Lieutenant(A) K.A. Chare RNVR

Insignia
- Squadron Badge Description: An elephant's head (Wartime unofficial)
- Identification Markings: not coded

Aircraft flown
- Patrol: Supermarine Sea Otter

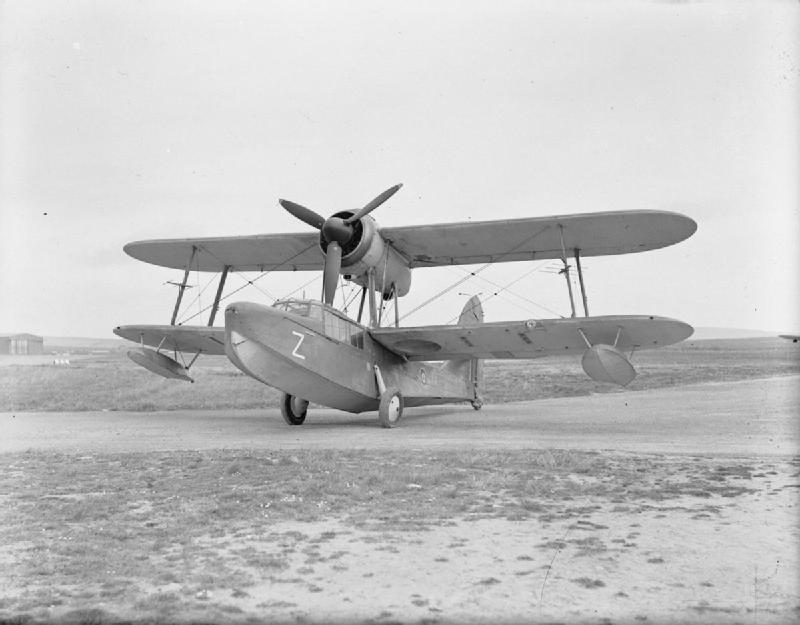
Supermarine Sea Otter, an example of the type used by 1703 NAS

1703 Naval Air Squadron (1703 NAS) was a Naval Air Squadron of the Royal Navy's Fleet Air Arm (FAA). It was formed in August 1945 at RNAS Lee-on-Solent (HMS Daedalus) for Air Sea Rescue duties in the Pacific. It was equipped with Supermarine Sea Otter. The Second World War ended in the same month that the squadron was formed, and it never deployed or saw action.

== History ==
=== Air Sea Rescue (1945) ===
1703 Naval Air Squadron formed on 1 August 1945 as an Air Sea Rescue (ASR) squadron at RNAS Lee-on-Solent (HMS Daedalus), Hampshire, England. It was equipped with six Supermarine Sea Otter, an amphibious maritime patrol and air sea rescue aircraft, and planned for operations in the Pacific. The squadron suffered from considerable issues with its aircraft and their engines, It was active for only forty-nine days, disbanding at RNAS Lee-on-Solent on 18 September 1945.

== Aircraft flown ==
1703 Naval Air Squadron flew only one aircraft type:

- Supermarine Sea Otter ABR.1 air sea rescue aircraft (August - September 1945)

== Naval air stations ==
1703 Naval Air Squadron operated from a single naval air station of the Royal Navy, in England:

- Royal Naval Air Station Lee-on-Solent (HMS Daedalus), Hampshire, (1 August 1945 - 18 September 1945)
- disbanded - (18 September 1945)

== Commanding Officers ==
List of commanding officers of 1703 Naval Air Squadron with date of appointment:

- Lieutenant(A) K.A. Chare, RNVR, from 1 August 1945
- disbanded - 18 September 1945

Note: Abbreviation (A) signifies Air Branch of the RN or RNVR.
