= 763 Naval Air Squadron =

Inactive flying squadron of the Royal Navy's Fleet Air Arm

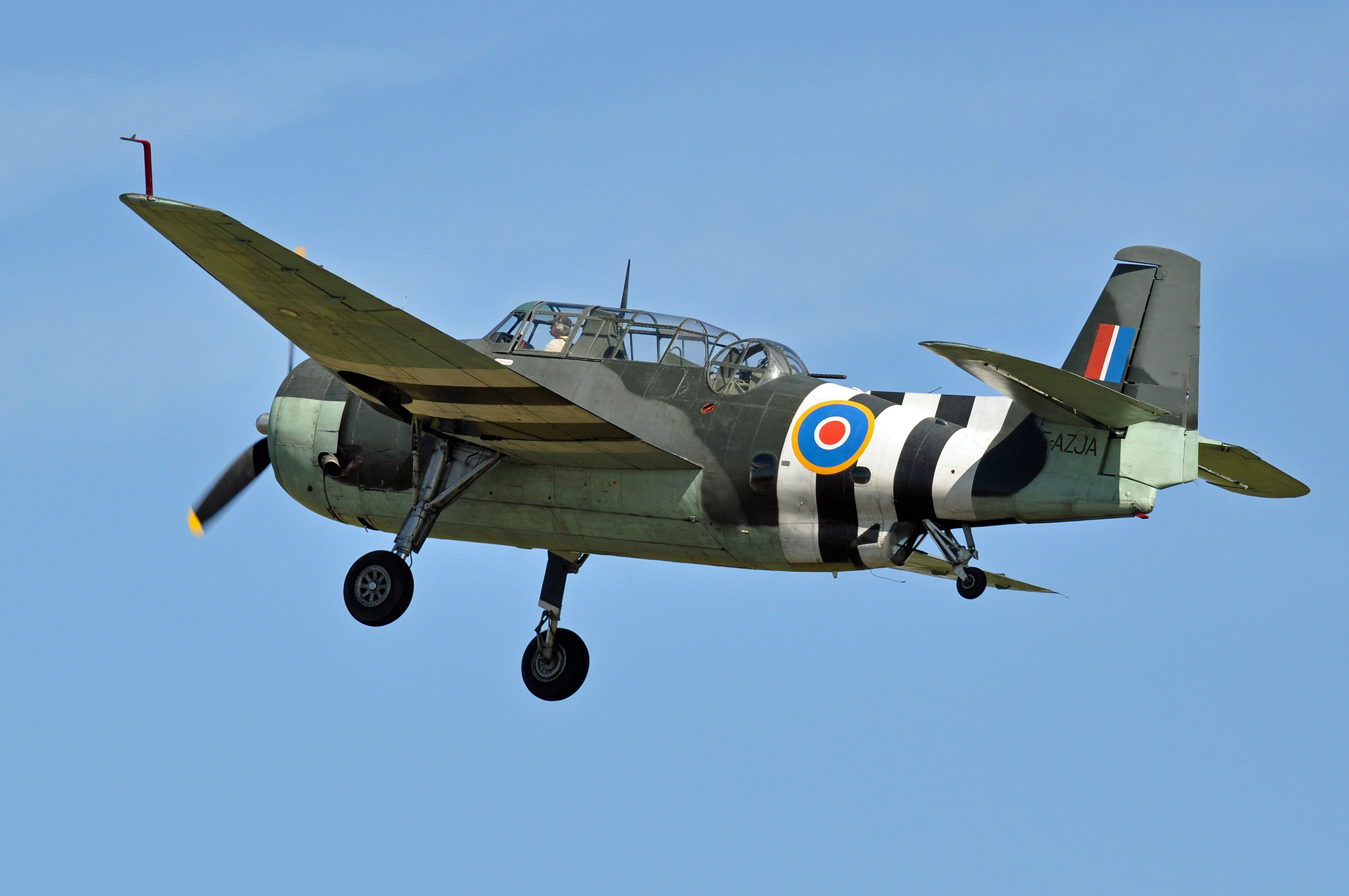
- Grumman Avenger; and example of the type used by 763 NAS
- Active: 1939–1940; 1942–1944; 1944–1945
- Disbanded: 31 July 1945
- Country: United Kingdom
- Branch: Royal Navy
- Type: Fleet Air Arm Second Line Squadron
- Role: Torpedo Spotter Reconnaissance Pool No. 1; Seaplane Training Squadron; Anti-submarine Operational Training Squadron
- Size: Squadron
- Part of: Fleet Air Arm

Insignia
- Identification Markings: P5A+ (Swordfish); K5A+ (Avenger) no markings (1942 to 1944); K5A+, K5AA+ & K6A+ (all types 1944 to 1945)

Aircraft flown
- Attack: Fairey Swordfish; Fairey Albacore; Grumman Avenger
- Patrol: Supermarine Walrus; Vought Kingfisher
- Trainer: Avro Anson

763 Naval Air Squadron (763 NAS) was a Fleet Air Arm (FAA) naval air squadron of the United Kingdom’s Royal Navy (RN). It formed in 1939 as the Torpedo Spotter Reconnaissance Pool No. 1, at HMS Kestrel, RNAS Worthy Down. Three months later, it moved to the short-lived RNAS Jersey, in the Channel Islands, before moving back to Worthy Down via HMS Daedalus, RNAS Lee-on Solent and disbanded in 1940. The squadron reformed, on the seaplane carrier HMS Pegasus, as a Seaplane Training Squadron, in 1942. This role lasted around two years and the squadron continually operated and provided training from HMS Pegasus, until disbanding in 1944. Roughly two months later, the squadron reformed again, this time at HMS Nightjar, RNAS Inskip, as an Anti-submarine Operational Training Squadron and remained in this role for just over one year, disbanding in July 1945.

== History ==
=== Torpedo Spotter Reconnaissance Pool No. 1 (1939-1940) ===
763 Naval Air Squadron formed, on 15 December 1939, at RNAS Worthy Down (HMS Kestrel), 3.5 miles (6 km) north of Winchester, in Hampshire, England, as the Torpedo Spotter Reconnaissance Pool No. 1. It was initially equipped with six Fairey Swordfish I, a biplane torpedo bomber aircraft.

The squadron moved to RNAS Jersey on 11 March 1940 taking its six Fairey Swordfish along with six Fairey Albacore biplane torpedo bomber aircraft. In early March the Admiralty had taken over Jersey airport, located at St Peter, Jersey, Channel Islands, to use as a Naval air station. However, due to the German occupation of France and the proximity to the Channel Islands, the Government concluded the Islands weren't defendable and 763 Naval Air Squadron relocated to RNAS Lee-on-Solent (HMS Daedalus), situated near Lee-on-the-Solent in Hampshire, on 31 May 1940.

The squadron remained at RNAS Lee-on-Solent for around one month before moving back to RNAS Worthy Down on 4 July 1940. Four days later, on 8 July, 763 Naval Air Squadron disbanded at Worthy Down, with 767 Naval Air Squadron incorporating the aircraft

In October 1940, a proposition to reform as a Torpedo Spotter Reconnaissance Pool, at RNAS Arbroath (HMS Condor), was postponed and eventually abandoned in February 1941.

=== Seaplane Training Squadron (1942-1944) ===
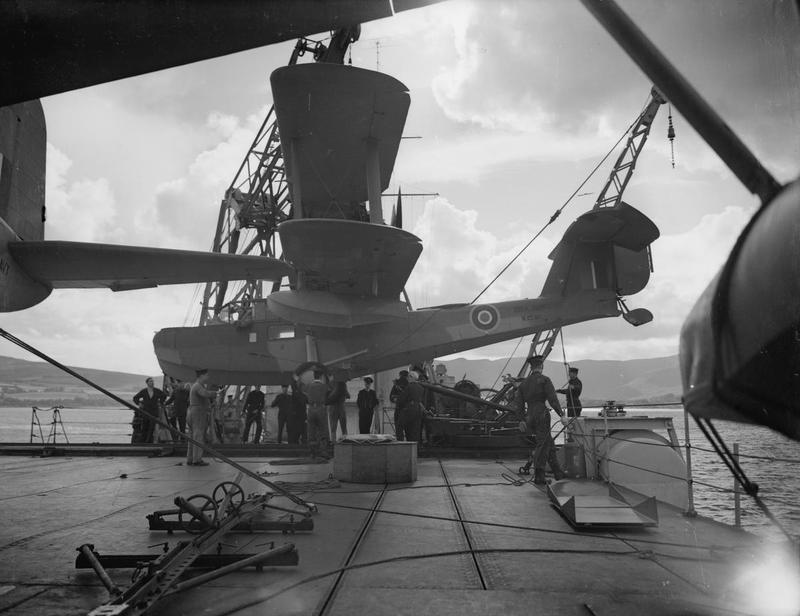
Catapult Training For Fleet Air Arm Pilots. An aircraft handling party learning to handle a Supermarine Walrus

763 Naval Air Squadron reformed on the 20 April 1942, as a Seaplane Training Squadron, aboard HMS Pegasus, which was designed and built as a seaplane carrier. It was equipped with Supermarine Walrus, a British amphibious maritime patrol aircraft and the squadron provided catapult and recovery training. It remained in the role and on the carrier for nearly two years. The squadron disbanded on HMS Pegasus, on 13 February 1944.

=== Anti-submarine Operational Training Squadron (1944-1945) ===
763 Naval Air Squadron reformed on the 14 April 1944, at RNAS Inskip (HMS Nightjar), located near the village of Inskip, Lancashire, England, as an Anti-submarine Operational Training Squadron, out of 766 Naval Air Squadron. It was equipped with Grumman Avenger, an American torpedo bomber aircraft.

In March 1945 the squadron also received Fairey Swordfish aircraft and a small Photographic Flight was set up. However, on the 31 July 1945, 763 Naval Air Squadron disbanded and was absorbed by 785 Naval Air Squadron at RNAS Crail (HMS Jackdaw).

== Aircraft operated ==
The squadron has operated a number of different aircraft types, including:

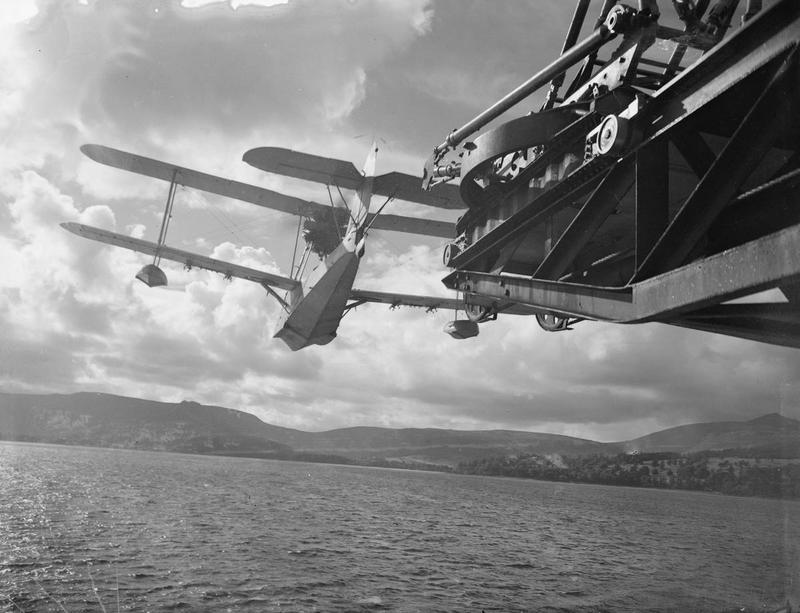
Catapult Training For Fleet Air Arm Pilots on HMS Pegasus

- Fairey Swordfish I torpedo bomber (December 1939 - July 1940)
- Fairey Albacore I torpedo bomber (March 1940 - July 1940)
- Supermarine Walrus I amphibious maritime patrol aircraft (April 1942 - February 1944)
- Vought Kingfisher I observation floatplane (July 1943 - September 1943)
- Grumman Tarpon GR.I torpedo bomber (April 1944 - July 1945)
- Grumman Avenger Mk.II torpedo bomber (April 1944 - July 1945)
- Avro Anson Mk I multirole and trainer aircraft (May 1944 - August 1945)
- Fairey Swordfish II torpedo bomber (March 1945 - July 1945)

== Naval air stations / seaplane carrier ==
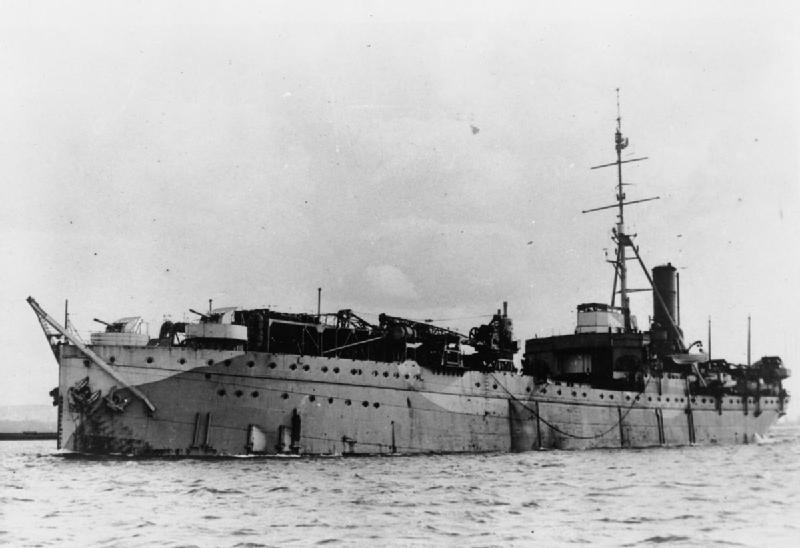
HMS Pegasus at anchor, taken between 1939 - 1945

763 Naval Air Squadron operated from a number of naval air stations of the Royal Navy in England and one in the Channel Islands, and a seaplane carrier:

1939 - 1940

- Royal Naval Air Station Worthy Down (HMS Kestrel), Hampshire, (15 December 1939 - 11 March 1940)
- Royal Naval Air Station Jersey, Jersey, Channel Islands, (11 March 1940 - 31 May 1940)
- Royal Naval Air Station Lee-on-Solent (HMS Daedalus), Hampshire, (31 May 1940 - 4 July 1940)
- Royal Naval Air Station Worthy Down (HMS Kestrel), Hampshire, (4 July 1940 - 8 July 1940)
- disbanded - (8 July 1940)

1942 - 1944

- HMS Pegasus (20 April 1942 - 13 February 1944)
- disbanded - (13 February 1944)

1944 - 1945

- Royal Naval Air Station Inskip (HMS Nightjar), Lancashire, (14 April 1944 - 31 July 1945)
- disbanded - (31 July 1945)

== Commanding officers ==
List of commanding officers of 763 Naval Air Squadron with date of appointment:

1939 - 1940

- Lieutenant Commander P.L. Mortimer, RN, from 18 December 1939
- disbanded - 8 July 1940

1942 - 1944

- Lieutenant(A) J.R.W. Groves, RN, from 9 October 1941
- Lieutenant S.M. Howard, RN, from 20 May 1943
- disbanded - 13 February 1944

1944 - 1945

- Lieutenant Commander(A) C.R. Mallett, RNVR, from 14 April 1944
- Lieutenant Commander(A) R.J.G. Brown, RNVR, from 13 July 1944
- Lieutenant Commander(A) N.G. Haigh, RNVR, from 20 December 1944
- disbanded - 31 July 1945

Note: Abbreviation (A) signifies Air Branch of the RN or RNVR.
