= RAF Ta Kali =

Former British RAF station in Malta

RAF Ta Kali
- Ta' Qali in Malta

Site information
- Type: Royal Air Force station
- Owner: Air Ministry; Admiralty
- Operator: Royal Air Force; Royal Navy
- Controlled by: Fleet Air Arm
- Condition: Extensively developed as a cultural site

Location
- Shown within Malta RAF Ta Kali (Europe)
- Coordinates: 35°53′42″N 014°25′15″E

Site history
- Built: 1939
- In use: 1940-1968
- Battles/wars: Siege of Malta WW2

Garrison information
- Past commanders: Group Captain Walter Myers Churchill DSO DFC RAF

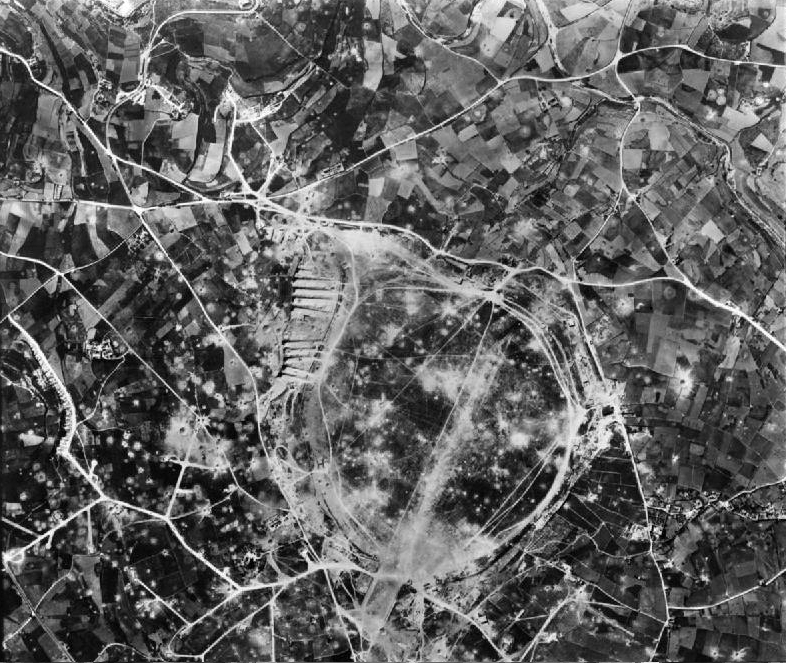
Aerial imagery of RAF Ta Kali in 1942, showing extensive bomb crater damage and trackways to aircraft dispersals.

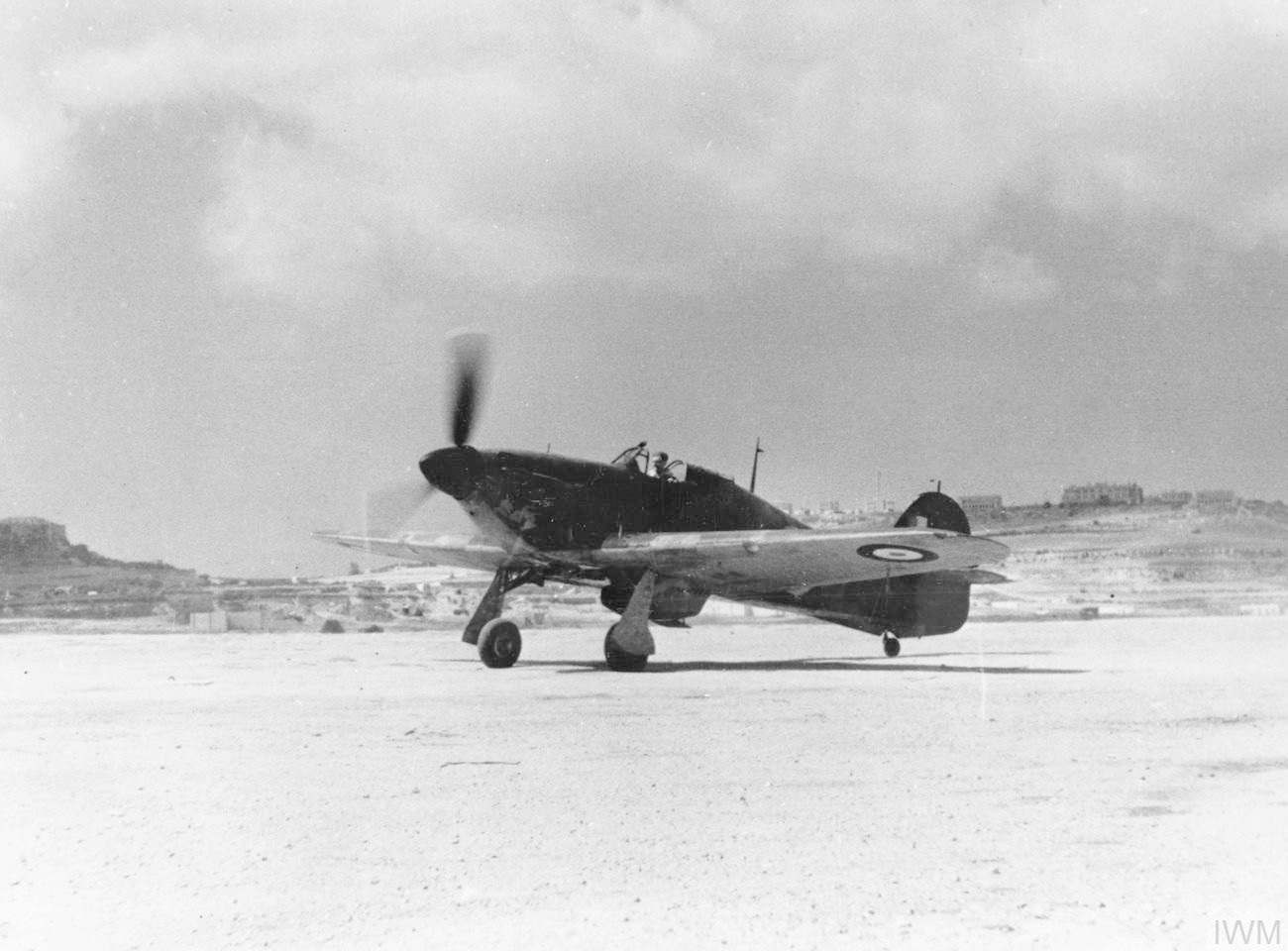
A Hawker Hurricane of 261 Squadron at RAF Ta Kali in 1941.

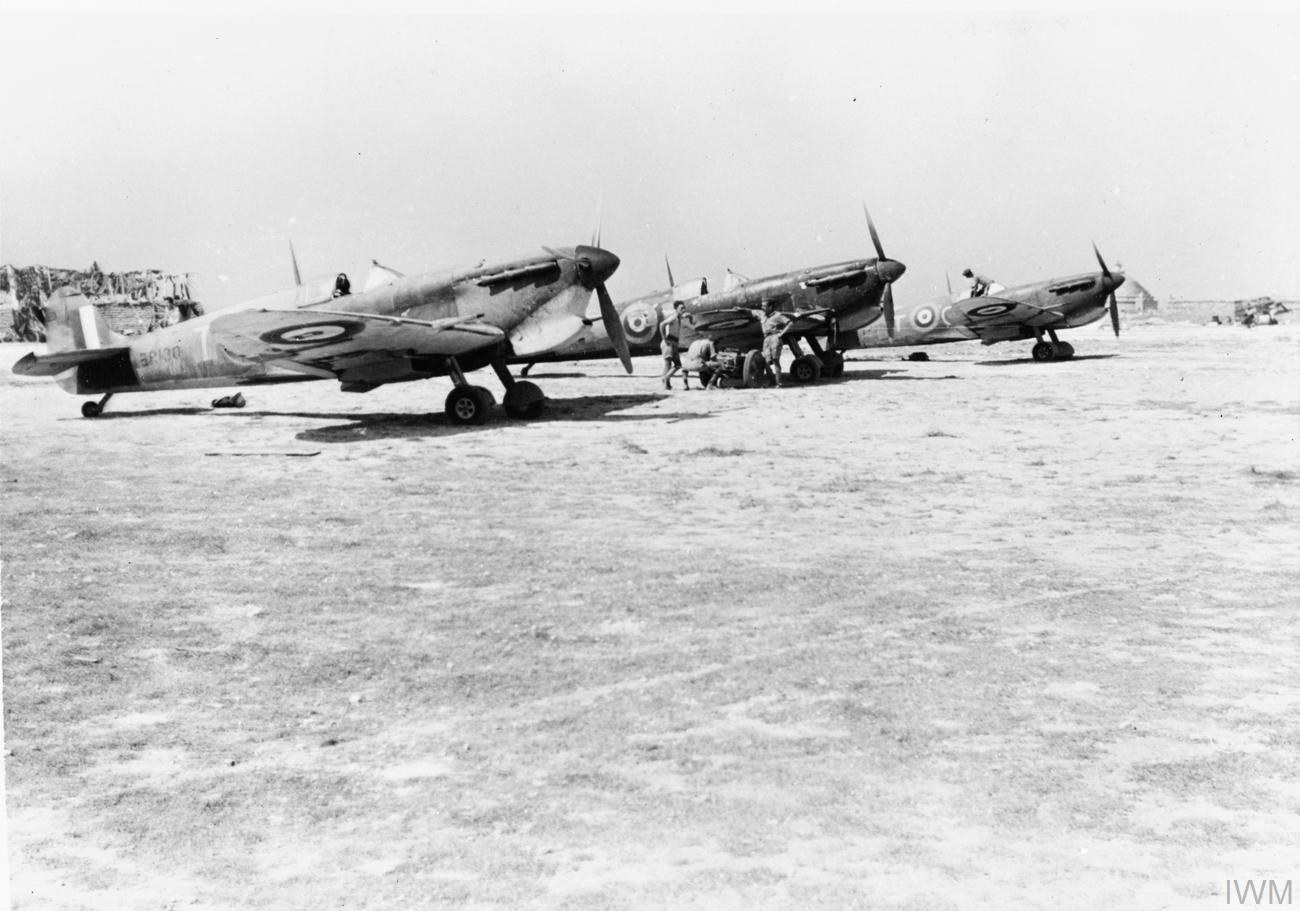
A Supermarine Spitfire of 249 Squadron at RAF Ta Kali in 1942.

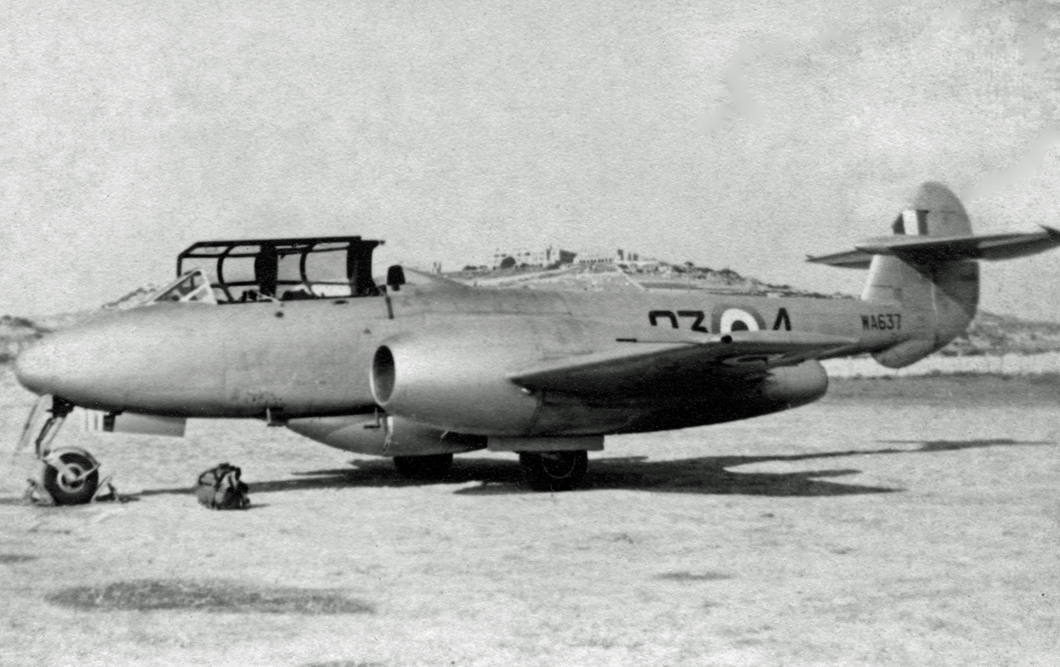
A Gloster Meteor T7 of 613 Squadron at RAF Ta Kali in 1952.

Royal Air Force Ta Kali was a Royal Air Force fighter operations base located on the island of Malta, which started life in 1940 as a diversion airstrip for the main operating bases such as RAF Luqa. Other diversion airstrips similar in function to Ta Kali were located at RAF Hal Far and on Malta's second island of Gozo at Xewkija airfield. The base's name reflects an anglicised corruption of the correct Maltese spelling of Ta' Qali; other phonetic variants of the correct name also appear regularly.

== History ==
=== Pre-War use ===
Ta' Qali originally had an unpaved airstrip before the outbreak of hostilities in 1939. The original airfield was built on a dried lake bed in the interior of the island on a reasonably featureless plain situated between Rabat and Valletta. Before the war it was used by civil aircraft, but its runway surface became unusable in heavy rain and so it was improved somewhat by the RAF.

=== Second World War ===
The former civil aviation facility was renamed RAF Station Ta Kali on 8 November 1940.

RAF Ta Kali was developed at a time when Malta was under intense aerial bombardment and Malta's Air Command needed to have alternative diversion airstrips in Malta, as the RAF's main operating bases were being bombed. Airfield improvements started in 1940 and for the next three years the RAF base was heavily developed. The RAF Regiment formed a unit at RAF Ta Kali in 1942.

The following units were also here at some point:

- No. 69 Squadron RAF between 31 October and 29 November 1941 with the Martin Maryland I and Hawker Hurricane IIC
- No. 81 Squadron RAF between 3 June and 18 July 1943 with the Spitfire VC & IX
- Detachment from No. 89 Squadron RAF between December 1941 and August 1942 with the Bristol Beaufighter IF
- No. 126 (Persian Gulf) Squadron RAF between 28 June 1941 and 6 April 1942 with Hurricane IIA & IIC and the Spitfire VB & VC
- No. 152 (Hyderabad) Squadron RAF between 4 June and 22 July 1943 with the Spitfire VC
- No. 154 (Motor Industries) Squadron RAF between 4 June and 20 July 1943 with the Spitfire VC
- Detachment from No. 185 Squadron RAF between May 1941 and May 1942 with the Hurricane IIA & IIC
- No. 227 Squadron RAF between 26 November 1942 and 1 March 1943 with the Beaufighter IC & VIC
- No. 229 Squadron RAF between 3 August and 10 December 1942 with the Spitfire VC
- No. 232 Squadron RAF between 3 June and 19 July 1943 with the Spitfire VB & IX
- No. 238 Squadron RAF between May and July 1941 with the Hurricane I
- No. 242 (Canadian) Squadron RAF between 7 January and 17 March 1942 with the Hurricane IIB
- No. 248 Squadron RAF between July and September 1942 with the Beaufighter VIC
- No. 249 Squadron RAF arrived from the UK to replace 261 Squadron in May 1941. 249 Squadron would be one of the most successful RAF fighter units on Malta
- No. 261 Squadron RAF being the first unit relocated from RAF Luqa on 20 November 1940
- No. 272 Squadron RAF equipped with Bristol Beaufighter VIFs were occasionally diverted to Ta Kali
- No. 603 (City of Edinburgh) Squadron AAF between 20 April and 3 August 1942 with the Spitfire VC
- Detachment from No. 605 (County of Warwick) Squadron AAF between January and March 1942

RAF Ta Kali remained a target for Axis aircraft attacks during the height of the siege.

=== Post war ===
Control of the airfield was transferred to the Royal Navy's Fleet Air Arm in 1945 as a shore establishment known as HMS Goldfinch,

Units

The following Fleet Air Arm squadron were here at some point:

- 727 Naval Air Squadron
- 728 Naval Air Squadron
- 800 Naval Air Squadron
- 802 Naval Air Squadron
- 807 Naval Air Squadron
- 809 Naval Air Squadron
- 810 Naval Air Squadron
- 815 Naval Air Squadron
- 820 Naval Air Squadron
- 824 Naval Air Squadron
- 826 Naval Air Squadron
- 828 Naval Air Squadron
- 845 Naval Air Squadron
- 881 Naval Air Squadron
- 882 Naval Air Squadron
- 885 Naval Air Squadron
- 888 Naval Air Squadron
- 894 Naval Air Squadron
- 1702 Naval Air Squadron

It was returned to RAF ownership in 1953. It was closed as an active RAF base in 1968. In 1952 RAF Gloster Meteor T.7s were based at Ta Kali. 601, 609 and 613 Royal Auxiliary Air Force Squadrons all deployed to Ta' Qali with their Gloster Meteor and de Havilland Vampire fighter aircraft during annual summer training camps in the early 1950s. The base was handed over to the Maltese Government in 1968.

The following fighter squadrons were based at RAF Ta Kali:

- No. 32 Squadron RAF between 16 October 1955 and 28 August 1956 with the de Havilland Venom FB.1
- No. 73 Squadron RAF between 15 July 1946 and 4 May 1953 with the Supermarine Spitfire IX & F.22 and the de Havilland Vampire F.3/5/9
- No. 208 Squadron RAF between 7 August 1956 and 1 March 1958 with the Gloster Meteor FR.9

== Current use ==
The former Ta' Qali airbase now hosts the Malta Aviation Museum, a venue for aviation and military history enthusiasts. Part of the site hosts the Malta Fairs & Conventions Centre.

There is also a craft village in some of the airfield's WW2-vintage support buildings.

== See also ==
- AHQ Malta
- Siege of Malta (World War II)
- Ta' Qali
- RAF Luqa
