= 783 Naval Air Squadron =

Inactive flying squadron of the Royal Navy's Fleet Air Arm

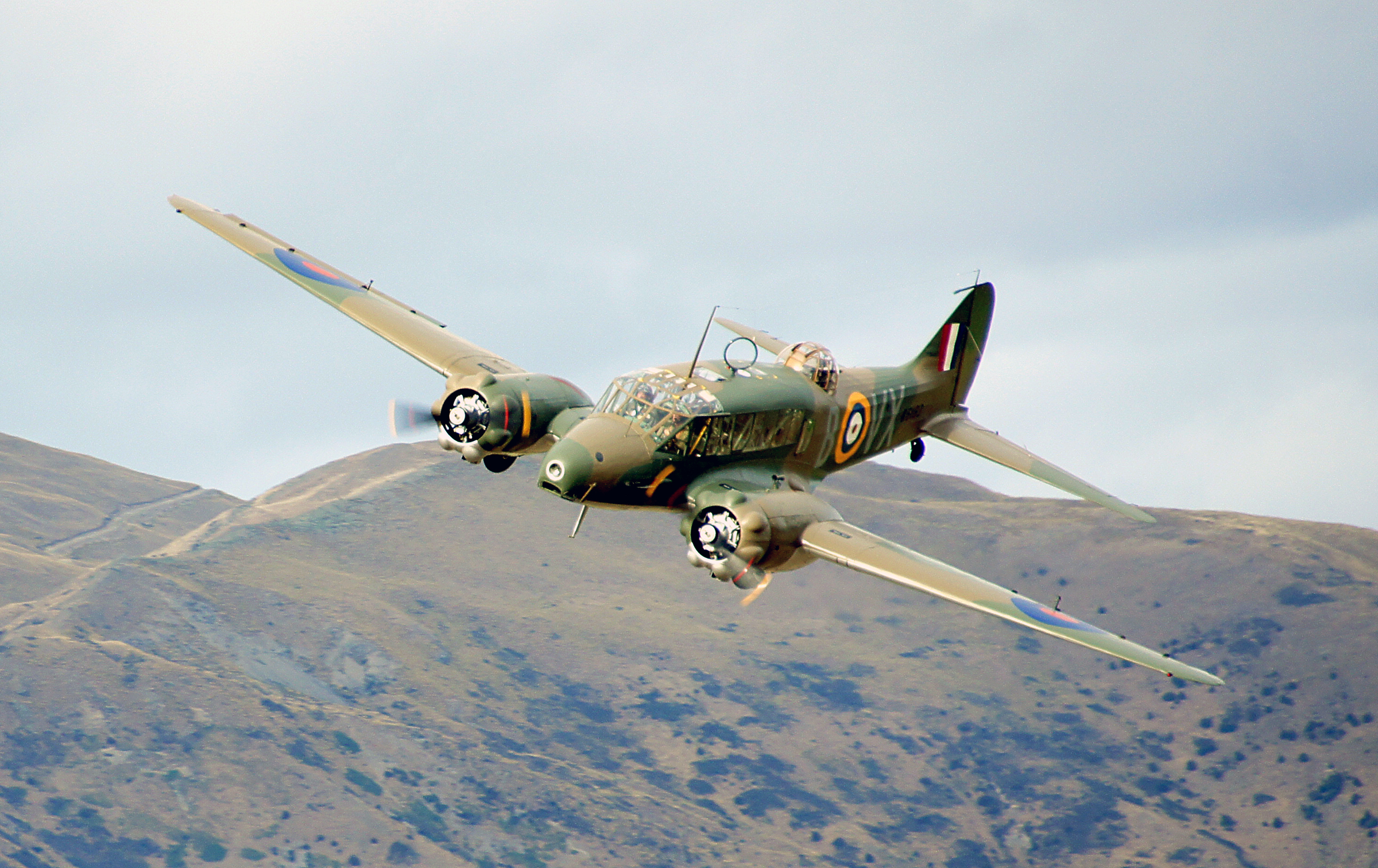
- Avro Anson; an example of the type used by 783 NAS
- Active: 1941–1949
- Disbanded: 18 November 1949
- Country: United Kingdom
- Branch: Royal Navy
- Type: Fleet Air Arm Second Line Squadron
- Role: ASV Training Squadron
- Size: Squadron
- Part of: Fleet Air Arm: 51st Miscellaneous Air Group (July 1948 - 1950)
- Last station: RNAS Lee-on-Solent
- Aircraft: See Aircraft flown section for full list.

Insignia
- Identification Markings: Individual numbers A0A+ & A6A+ (from 1941); 601-608 (Anson from 1947); 323-335 (Barracuda from 1947)
- Fin Shore Codes: LP (from 1947)

783 Naval Air Squadron (783 NAS) was a Fleet Air Arm (FAA) naval air squadron of the United Kingdom’s Royal Navy (RN) which last disbanded in November 1949. 783 Naval Air Squadron was formed as an ASV Training Squadron (air-to-surface-vessel radar) at HMS Condor, RNAS Arbroath, Scotland, in January 1941. It operated a number of ‘flying classroom’ aircraft alongside other types. It operated in conjunction with the Naval Air Signals School (NASS) from March 1943. The squadron moved to HMS Daedalus, RNAS Lee-on-Solent, England, when the NASS moved south, also supporting the Flag Officer, Air, Home Communications Officer and from July 1948, it was part of the 51st Miscellaneous Air Group.

== History ==
=== ASV Training Squadron (1941–1949) ===
783 Naval Air Squadron formed on 9 January 1941 at RNAS Arbroath (HMS Condor) as the air-to-surface-vessel (ASV) radar training squadron. Essentially the squadron formed from an existing ASV training Flight which was based at HMS Condor. It was quipped with Fairey Swordfish, a biplane torpedo bomber, Fairey Albacore, also a biplane torpedo bomber, and Supermarine Walrus, an amphibious maritime patrol aircraft. It also used a de Havilland DH.86 Express which was fitted out as an air-to-surface-vessel radar flying classroom, although the main flying classroom operated was the Avro Anson, a multirole aircraft, used primarily as a trainer aircraft. The de Havilland Express was damaged by ‘friendly fire' from a Royal Navy minesweeper and was replaced with a Vickers Wellington, a long range medium bomber and over time more of these aircraft were received, equipped with ASV radar.

From March 1943, 783 Naval Air Squadron operated in conjunction with the Naval Air Signal School, at RNAS Arbroath. It received Fairey Firefly, a carrier-borne fighter and anti-submarine aircraft, Fairey Barracuda, a carrier-borne torpedo and dive bomber, and Grumman Avenger, an American torpedo bomber. In May 1947 the squadron moved south relocating to RNAS Lee-on-Solent (HMS Daedalus), in Hampshire, with the Naval Air Signal School now based at Seafield Park, Hampshire which was situated next to the airbase. At then at the end of the year it temporarily operated a number of Fairey Barracuda TR.5, before receiving new Avro Anson aircraft. The squadron also operated an Avro Anson for use by the Flag Officer, Air, Home Communications Officer.

On 31 May 1948, a de Havilland DH.89A Dominie, NR753, operated by 783 Naval Air Squadron, was destroyed in a mid-air collision near Bulford Camp, Wiltshire. The Dominie was leading a formation of aircraft when it collided with Avro Anson NL248; the Dominie’s tailplane was struck by the Anson’s propeller, causing the aircraft to crash. All three occupants of the Dominie were killed.

in July 1948, the squadron made up part of the 51st Miscellancous Air Group and then in 1949 it ran a radio refresher course for Observers and Aircrew. 783 Naval Air Squadron disbanded on 18 November 1949.

== Aircraft flown ==
The squadron operated a number of different aircraft types, including:

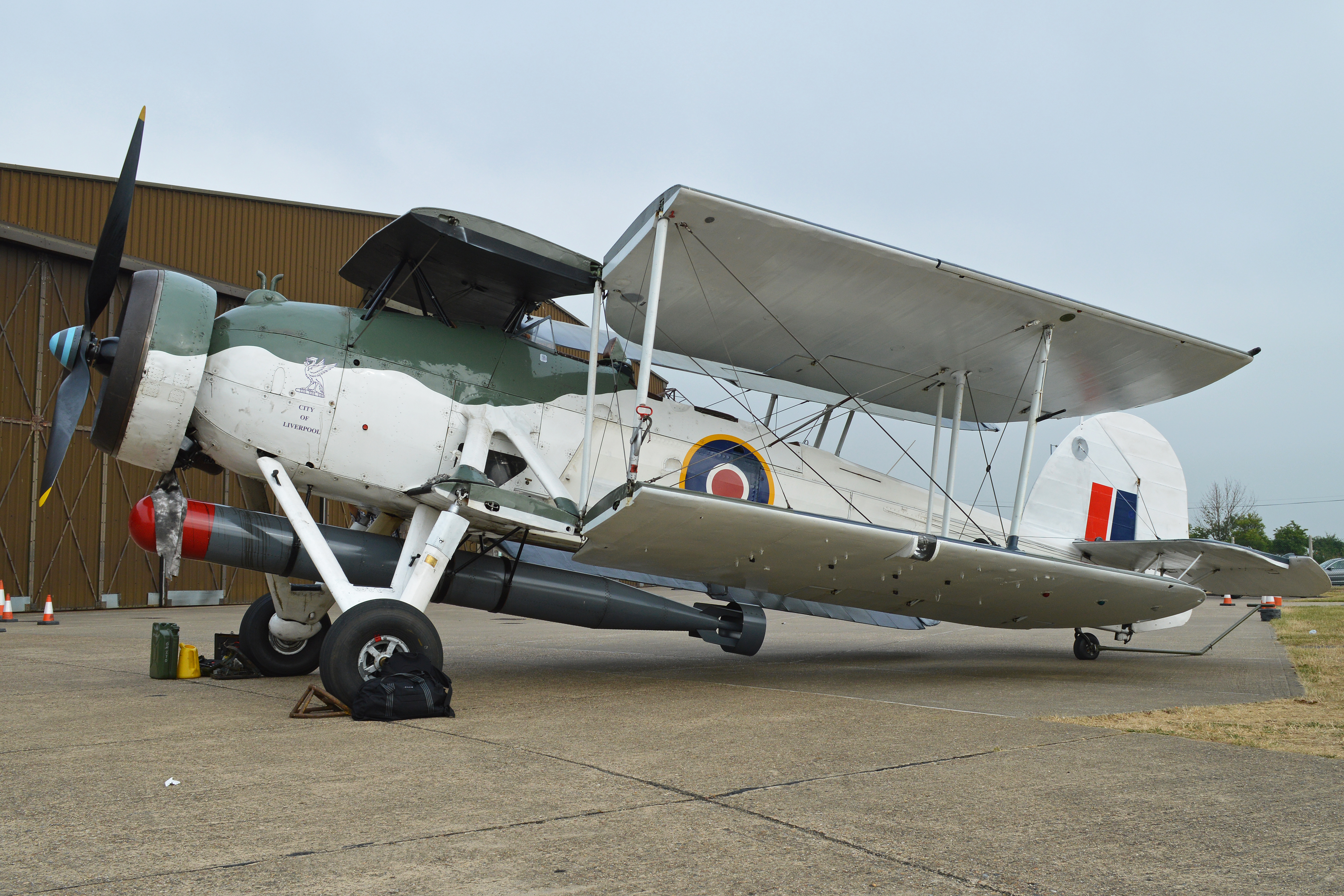
Fairey Swordfish II

- Fairey Swordfish II torpedo bomber (January 1941 - July 1945)
- Supermarine Walrus maritime patrol aircraft (January 1941 - January 1944)
- de Havilland Express passenger transport aircraft (August 1941 - July 1942)
- Avro Anson I multirole aircraft (January 1942 - November 1949)
- Fairey Albacore torpedo bomber (December 1942 - February 1943)
- Vickers Wellington I medium bomber (February 1944 - June 1945)
- Fairey Firefly I/FR.I fighter and reconnaissance aircraft (September 1944 - December 1946)
- Fairey Barracuda II torpedo and dive bomber (October 1944 - December 1946)
- Grumman Avenger torpedo bomber (December 1944 - July 1946)
- Fairey Barracuda TR.5 torpedo and dive bomber (November 1947 - October 1948)

== Naval air stations ==
783 Naval Air Squadron operated from a couple of naval air stations of the Royal Navy, in the United Kingdom:

- Royal Naval Air Station Arbroath (HMS Condor), Angus, (9 January 1941 - 15 May 1947)
- Royal Naval Air Station Lee-on-Solent (HMS Daedalus), Hampshire, (15 May 1947 - 18 November 1949)
- disbanded - (18 November 1949)

== Commanding officers ==
List of commanding officers of 783 Naval Air Squadron with date of appointment:

- Lieutenant Commander(A) J.M. Waddell, RNVR, from 9 January 1941
- Lieutenant Commander(A) J.M. Kene-Miller, RNVR, from 7 November 1941
- Lieutenant Commander(A) D.M. Brown, RNVR, from 15 June 1942
- Lieutenant Commander(A) R.P. Mason, RNVR, from 29 December 1942
- Lieutenant Commander(A) T.B. Horsley, RNVR, from 30 August 1944
- Lieutenant(A) W.L.M. Daubney, RNVR, from 10 November 1945
- Lieutenant(A) E.H.G. Child, RNVR, from 10 December 1945
- Lieutenant M.H. Sandes, RCNR, from 1 July 1946
- Lieutenant Commander A.M. Tuke, DSC, RN, from 1 December 1946
- Lieutenant Commander K.C. Winstanley, RN, from 1 December 1947 (KIFA 30 May 1948)
- Lieutenant G.H. Colles, RN, from 31 May 1948
- Lieutenant P.H. Parsons, MBE, RN, from 24 September 1949
- disbanded - 18 November 1949

Note: Abbreviation (A) signifies Air Branch of the RN or RNVR.
