= VOS-7 =

Observation Squadron 7
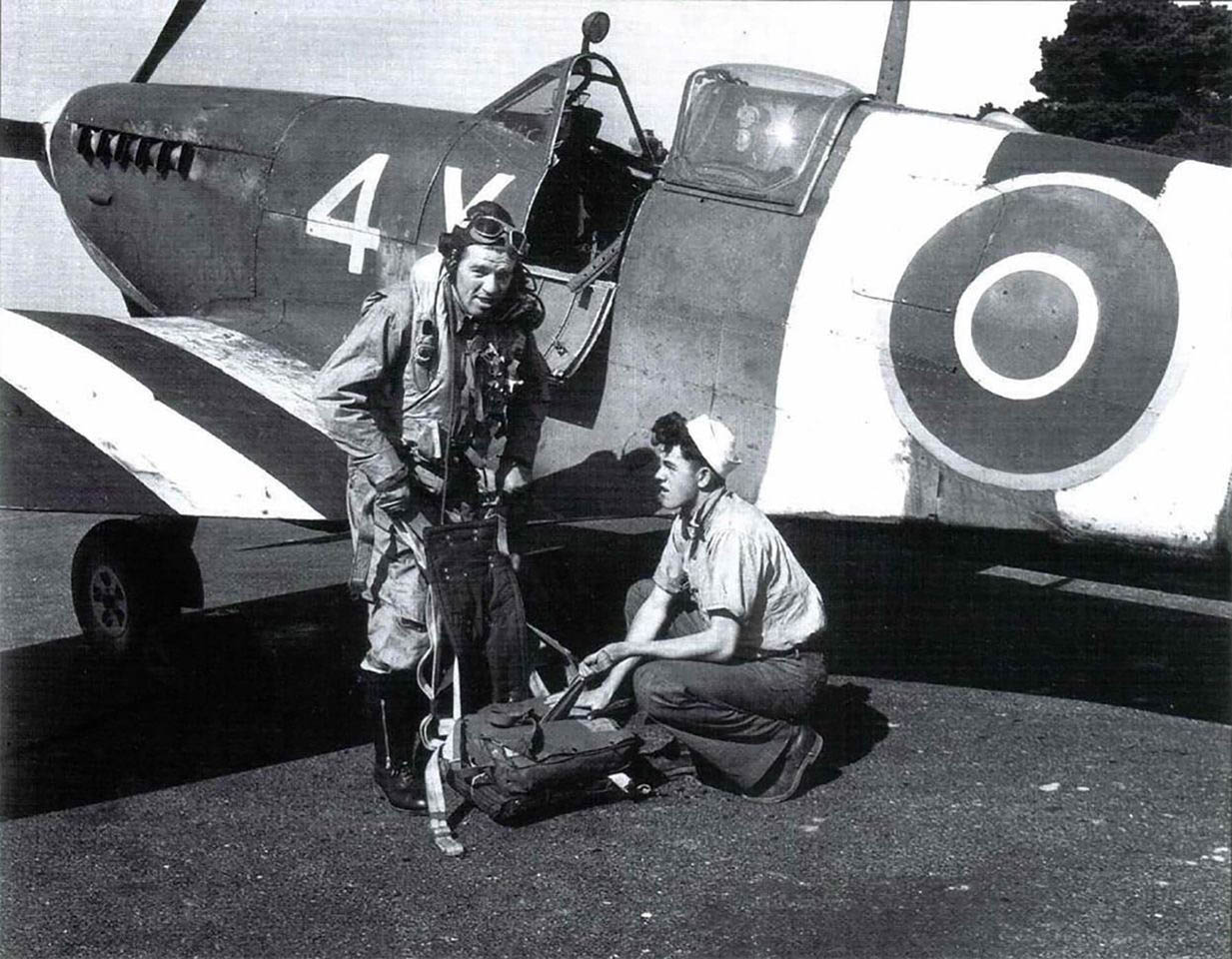
- US Naval aviators flew these early Spitfire Mk V fighters to spot naval gunfire during the Normandy invasion.
- Active: 1–26 June 1944
- Country: United States
- Branch: United States Navy
- Type: Observation
- Role: Artillery observer
- Garrison/HQ: RNAS Lee-on-Solent (HMS Daedalus)
- Engagements: Operation Overlord

Observation Squadron 7 (VOS-7) (or VCS-7) was a United States Navy artillery observer aircraft squadron based in England during Operation Overlord. The squadron was assembled expressly to provide aerial spotting for naval gunfire support during the invasion of Normandy. Personnel and aircraft were assembled on 1 June 1944 and began flying missions on 6 June 1944. The squadron was disbanded when Allied capture of the town of Cherbourg ended naval bombardment responsibilities on 26 June 1944. It is thought to be one of the shortest-lived squadrons in the history of United States military aviation.

== Background ==
Catapult-launched Vought OS2U Kingfisher and Curtiss SOC Seagull observation floatplanes traditionally carried aboard battleships and cruisers for artillery observers had been unable to survive Axis fighter planes during the amphibious invasion of Sicily. Faster and more maneuverable fighters were expected to provide more reliable observation of naval gunfire support during the invasion of Normandy. Fighters could reach the invasion coast from bases in England, and gunfire support warship availability would be increased by eliminating time required for launch and recovery of aircraft.

== Personnel and aircraft ==
Seventeen aviators were assigned from the VCS squadron detachments aboard the battleships USS Arkansas, Texas and Nevada and the heavy cruisers USS Augusta, Tuscaloosa and Quincy. These naval aviators, commanded by the senior aviator from Quincy, were trained by the United States Army Air Forces 67th Reconnaissance Group to fly Supermarine Spitfire Mk V fighter aircraft. VOS-7 is thought to be the only United States Navy Squadron flying Spitfires.

== Operations ==
VOS-7 was part of the air spotting pool for the Normandy invasion (the 34th Reconnaissance Wing of the RAF Second Tactical Air Force) commanded by Royal Navy Commodore E.C. Thornton. Use of drop tanks allowed missions of two hours with about 30 minutes transit time to the combat area, 45 minutes on station, and 30 minutes to return to base. Spotting missions flew in pairs. The spotter piloted the lead aircraft while his wingman watched for enemy fighters. Preferred altitude was 6,000 feet (1,800 m), but overcast skies often limited visibility above 1,500 feet (460 m).

VOS-7 flew 191 (or 209) combat sorties beginning on 6 June. Ninety-four of those sorties were flown in the first three days. The senior aviator from Tuscaloosa was killed when his Spitfire was hit by flak on 6 June. Flak was responsible for most of the eight VOS-7 Spitfires destroyed by combat damage; but their pilots survived, as did the pilot of a ninth Spitfire destroyed in a non-combat accident. Four VOS-7 pilots survived encounters with Messerschmitt Bf 109 and Focke-Wulf Fw 190 fighters. VOS-7 pilots were awarded nine Distinguished Flying Crosses and eleven Air Medals.
