= 1702 Naval Air Squadron =

Inactive flying squadron of the Royal Navy's Fleet Air Arm

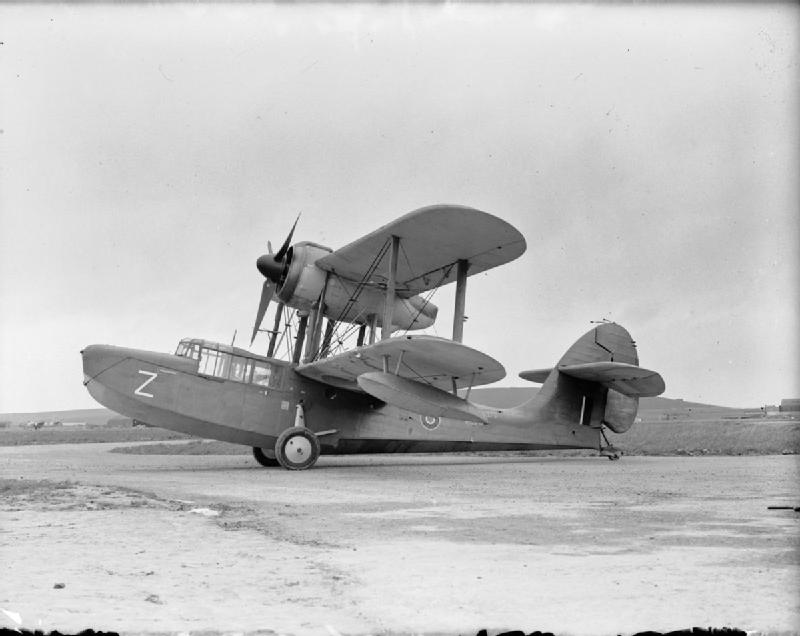
- Supermarine Sea Otter; an example of the type used by 1702 NAS
- Active: 1945–1946
- Disbanded: 12 September 1946
- Country: United Kingdom
- Branch: Royal Navy
- Type: Amphibian Bomber Reconnaissance Squadron
- Role: Air Sea Rescue; Special Service
- Size: six aircraft
- Part of: Fleet Air Arm
- Home station: See Naval air stations section for full list.

Insignia
- Identification Markings: 02A+ on Ocean

Aircraft flown
- Patrol: Supermarine Sea Otter

1702 Naval Air Squadron (1702 NAS) was a Naval Air Squadron of the Royal Navy's Fleet Air Arm (FAA), which last disbanded during September 1946. It was formed in June 1945 at HMS Daedalus, RNAS Lee-on-Solent, as a Special Service squadron. It was equipped with the Supermarine Sea Otter, and by the end of the Second World War the squadron remained at Lee-on-Solent. It joined HMS Trouncer in September 1945 to search for mines in the Mediterranean. A detachment of three aircraft were aboard HMS Ocean when the squadron disbanded at Malta and this became the Ship's Flight.

== History ==
=== Special Service Squadron (1945-1946) ===
1702 Naval Air Squadron formed on 1 August 1945 at RNAS Lee-on-Solent (HMS Daedalus), Hampshire, England. It was designated as a Special Service Squadron under the command of Lieutenant(A) O.G.W. Hutchinson, RNVR. The squadron was equipped with six Supermarine Sea Otter, an amphibious maritime patrol and air sea rescue aircraft, intended for operations in the Pacific.

Instead, with the surrender of Japan, the squadron deployed to the Mediterranean. It embarked in the Ruler-class escort carrier HMS Trouncer, via RNAS Abbotsinch (HMS Sanderling), Paisley, Scotland, arriving on 5 September, for passage to Malta on 13 and disembarked on 22 at RNAS Hal Far (HMS Falcon), undertaking air sea rescue duties.

During October the squadron took on mine hunting work around Greece and from May 1946 performed the same task in Tunisia. It returned to Malta in July moving to RNAS Takali (HMS Goldfinch) where it disbanded on 12 September 1946.

== Aircraft flown ==
1702 Naval Air Squadron flew only one aircraft type:

- Supermarine Sea Otter I/II maritime patrol aircraft (June 1945 - September 1946)

== Naval air stations ==
1702 Naval Air Squadron operated from a couple of naval air stations of the Royal Navy in the United Kingdom, some overseas in Malta, and other airbases:

- Royal Naval Air Station Lee-on-Solent (HMS Daedalus), Hampshire, (1 June - 5 September 1945)
- Royal Naval Air Station Abbotsinch (HMS Sanderling), Renfrewshire, (5 - 13 September 1945)
- HMS Trouncer (13 - 22 September 1945)
- Royal Naval Air Station Hal Far (HMS Falcon), Malta, (22 September - 27 October 1945)
- Hassani (Athens), Greece, (27 October 1945 - 25 May 1946)
  - Calato, Rhodes, (Detachment 5 March - 23 May 1946)
  - Araxos, Greece, (Detachment 17 April - 27 May 1946)
  - Royal Naval Air Station Hal Far (HMS Falcon), Malta, (Detachment 23 - 25 May 1946)
- El Aouina, Tunisia, (25 - 28 May 1946)
- Bizerta, Tunisia, (28 May - 19 July 1946)
  - El Aouina, Tunisia, (Detachment 5 -19 July 1946)
- Royal Naval Air Station Takali (HMS Goldfinch), Malta, (19 July 46 - 12 September 1946)
  - HMS Ocean (Detachment three aircraft 25 July - 12 December 1946)
- disbanded - (12 September 1946)

== Commanding Officers ==
List of commanding officers of 1702 Naval Air Squadron with date of appointment:

- Lieutenant(A) O.G.W. Hutchinson, RNVR, from 1 June 45
- Lieutenant(A) R.H. Kilburn, RNVR, from 15 January 1946
- disbanded - 12 September 1946

Note: Abbreviation (A) signifies Air Branch of the RN or RNVR.
