= Fairey Seafox =

1930s British reconnaissance floatplane

Seafox
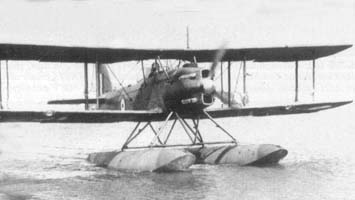

General information
- Type: ship-borne reconnaissance seaplane
- National origin: United Kingdom
- Manufacturer: Fairey Aviation
- Primary user: Royal Navy (Fleet Air Arm)
- Number built: 66

History
- Introduction date: 23 April 1937
- First flight: 27 May 1936
- Retired: 1943

The Fairey Seafox was a 1930s British reconnaissance floatplane designed and built by Fairey for the Fleet Air Arm. It was designed to be catapulted from the deck of a light cruiser and served in the Second World War. Sixty-six were built, with two finished without floats and used as landplanes.

== Design and development ==
The Fairey Seafox was built to satisfy Air Ministry Specification S.11/32 for a two-seat spotter-reconnaissance floatplane. The first of two prototypes appeared in 1936, first flying on 27 May 1936, and the first of the 64 production aircraft were delivered in 1937. The flights were organised as 700 Naval Air Squadron of the Fleet Air Arm.

The fuselage was of all-metal monocoque construction, the wings being covered with metal on the leading edge, otherwise fabric. It was powered by a 16-cylinder 395 hp (295 kW) air-cooled Napier Rapier H engine. It cruised at 106 mph (171 km/h), and had a range of 440 mi (710 km). The Seafox handled well but it was criticised for being underpowered, engine cooling was poor and landing speeds were higher than desired.

== Operational history ==
In 1939, a Seafox played a part in the Battle of the River Plate against the German pocket battleship Admiral Graf Spee, by spotting for the naval gunners. Seafoxes operated during the early part of the war from the cruisers HMS Emerald, Neptune, Orion, Ajax, Arethusa and Penelope and the armed merchant cruisers HMS Pretoria Castle, Asturias and Alcantara. They remained in service until 1943.

== Operators ==
- 700 Naval Air Squadron
- 702 Naval Air Squadron
- 703 Naval Air Squadron
- 713 Naval Air Squadron
- 714 Naval Air Squadron
- 716 Naval Air Squadron
- 718 Naval Air Squadron
- 754 Naval Air Squadron
- 764 Naval Air Squadron
- 765 Naval Air Squadron
- 773 Naval Air Squadron

== Specification ==
Data from Fairey Aircraft since 1915

General characteristics

- Crew: 2
- Length: 33 ft 5 in (10.19 m)
- Wingspan: 40 ft (12 m)
- Height: 12 ft 2 in (3.71 m)
- Wing area: 434 sq ft (40.3 m^{2})
- Empty weight: 3,805 lb (1,726 kg)
- Gross weight: 5,420 lb (2,458 kg)
- Fuel capacity: 96 imp gal (115 US gal; 440 L)
- Powerplant: 1 × Napier Rapier VI H-16 air-cooled piston engine, 395 hp (295 kW)
- Propellers: 3-bladed propeller

Performance

- Maximum speed: 124 mph (200 km/h, 108 kn) at 5,860 ft (1,786 m) (rated altitude)
- Cruise speed: 106 mph (171 km/h, 92 kn) * Alighting speed: 58 mph (50 kn; 93 km/h)
- Range: 440 mi (710 km, 380 nmi)
- Endurance: 4 hours 15 minutes
- Service ceiling: 9,700 ft (3,000 m)
- Time to altitude: 5,000 ft (1,500 m) 15 minutes 30 seconds

Armament

- Guns: 1 × 0.303 in (7.7 mm) machine gun
- Bombs: under-wing racks for 2 × 100 lb (45 kg) bombs and 8 × 20 lb (9.1 kg) bombs

== See also ==
Aircraft of comparable role, configuration, and era

- Arado Ar 196
- Curtiss SOC Seagull
- Fokker C.XI
- Hawker Osprey
- Mitsubishi F1M
- Supermarine Walrus

Related lists

- List of aircraft of World War II
- List of aircraft of the Fleet Air Arm
- List of flying boats and floatplanes
