= Supermarine Sea Otter =

British amphibious aircraft

Sea Otter
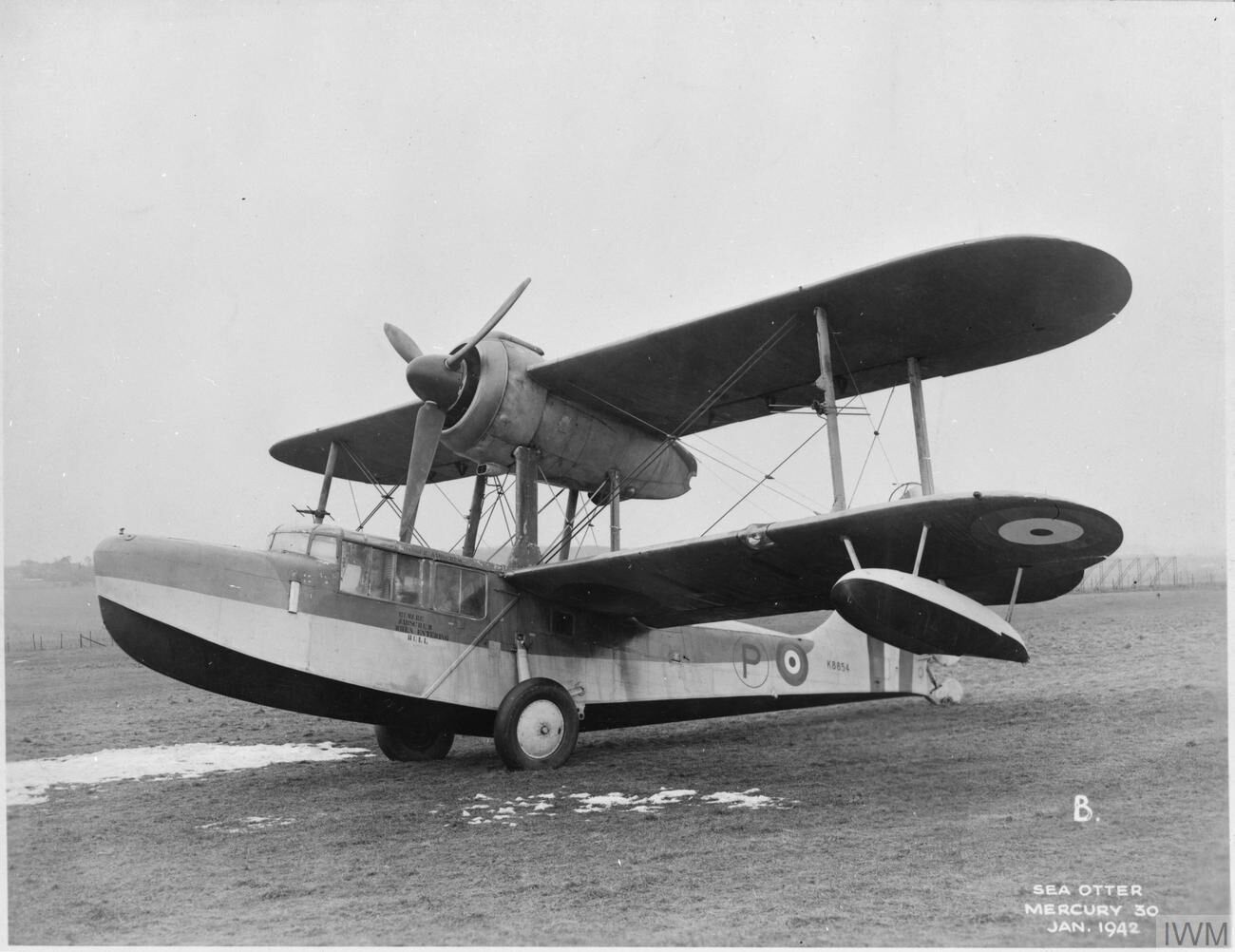
- One of the two constructed prototypes, photographed in 1942

General information
- Type: Air-Sea rescue
- National origin: United Kingdom
- Manufacturer: Supermarine
- Status: Out of production, out of service
- Primary users: Royal Air Force Royal Navy; Royal Danish Air Force; Royal Australian Navy
- Number built: 292

History
- Manufactured: 1942–1945
- Introduction date: November 1944
- First flight: 23 September 1938
- Developed from: Supermarine Walrus

The Supermarine Sea Otter was an amphibious aircraft designed and built by the British aircraft manufacturer Supermarine. It was the final biplane flying boat to be designed by the company, and the last biplane to enter service with both the Royal Navy and the Royal Air Force (RAF).

The Sea Otter was developed as a refinement of the Supermarine Walrus. It was designed to be used for longer range operations, to perform dive bombing and to operate from a wider range of vessels than its predecessor. It was first known as the Stingray. The aircraft's development was protracted by Supermarine's commitments to the Walrus and the Spitfire programmes.

The Sea Otter first flew on 23 September 1938. A production order was issued in 1942. Upon its introduction during the latter years of the Second World War, the Sea Otter was primarily tasked with maritime patrol and air-sea rescue duties by both the RAF and the Royal Navy. After the war, the type was procured by the Royal Danish Air Force, Dutch Naval Aviation Service, and the Royal Australian Navy. Supermarine undertook the conversion of surplus Sea Otters to be used by civil operators.

== Design and development ==
=== Background ===
The origins of the Sea Otter can be traced back to the Supermarine Walrus. Even prior to the Walrus's maiden flight, the company's design team, headed by R. J. Mitchell, were working on an improved version of the aircraft that was powered by either Bristol Aquila and Bristol Perseus radial engines. In February 1936, Mitchell approached the Air Ministry's Director of Technical Development to determine desirable performance attributes in the tentative aircraft prior to the detailed design commencing. From these discussions, it was decided to pursue a dive bombing capability, an elevated loaded weight, longer range, and for it to be fitted with equipment for operating from both aircraft carriers and cruisers.

On 17 April 1936, following Supermarine's submission of technical details, including detailed drawings and costings, the Air Ministry issued instructions to proceed with a pair of prototypes. Progress on these two prototypes was slow, due to production commitments associated with both the Walrus and the Spitfire programmes. The most visible difference between the Walrus and the Sea Otter was in the mounting of the powerplant; while the Walrus had a rear-facing engine with a pusher propeller, the Sea Otter's engine faced forward with a tractor propeller. In general, the exterior of the Sea Otter was cleaner than that of the Walrus, particularly in its engine arrangement, having disposed of the offset engine alignment to counteract torque by handling this via the vertical stabiliser instead.

=== Into flight ===
The first prototype, K8854T, performed the type's maiden flight on 23 September 1938, piloted by Supermarine's chief test pilot George Pickering. During the flight, it was quickly determined that the original two-blade wooden propeller was inadequate. It was later replaced by a three-blade counterpart produced by de Havilland, although this also failed to produce entirely satisfactory results. The propeller was changed again, this time to a four-bladed unit of which the pairs of blades were unusually set at an angle of 35° instead of the usual 90° so that the aircraft could be more easily moved within shipborne hangars and other enclosed areas.

After the prototype's third flight, the name Stingray was changed to Sea Otter. Pickering observed its performance during the flight was noticeably better, particularly during takeoff. Over following flights, minor defects were identified and promptly resolved. During February 1939, sea recovery trials were begun from HMS Pegasus, resulting in some deviations being made from the standard practices used for deploying the earlier Walrus. The British Admiralty requested some changes, including that the nose be reprofiled to reduce its tendency to spray water, as well as the installation of a three-blade Rotol constant speed propeller. Five months later, catapult trials were conducted involving HMS Pegasus. General seaworthiness trials started during September 1939. They took place at Southampton on account of a possible German attacks upon Felixstowe.

=== Into production ===
On 26 January 1940, following the visit of a high-level technical delegation to Supermarine, the Sea Otter was ordered into production. It was stipulated that the aircraft needed to land at a lower speed; this was achieved via alterations to the wings. Other requested alterations included the addition of a nose-mounted Vickers K machine gun and greater headroom on the flight deck. A contract for 190 Sea Otters was issued to Blackburn Aircraft later in 1940, but the contact with the company was cancelled the following year, as it was unable to accommodate the extra workload.

Accordingly, it wasn't until January 1942 that the Air Ministry placed a production order for the Sea Otter with Saunders-Roe, who had previously manufactured the Walrus as well. Due to cooling troubles found with the Perseus engine, the powerplant was changed for production aircraft to the Bristol Mercury XXX engine, which drove a three-bladed propeller. The first production Sea Otter, piloted by Jeffrey Quill, performed its first flight during January 1943. It was promptly transferred to RAF Worthy Down for its initial flight trials, and subsequently to Helensburgh for further water handling trials. Several minor alterations, including an elongated water rudder and a sting-type arrestor hook, occurred around this time.

Of the 592 aircraft that were at one point on order, only 292 Sea Otters were constructed. This was largely due to type's production run being disrupted by limited production capacity and by a sharp reduction in military demand following Victory in Europe Day and the end of the conflict.

During the postwar era, a large number of Sea Otters were converted for civilian use. The cabin was soundproofed and furnished with heating systems. In the cabin, seating for four passengers, a chemical toilet and a stowage area for baggage were provided. As they were intended for use as bush airplanes in remote areas, versatility was an important aspect; to allow cargo to be carried, the cabin floor was strengthened and fitted with lashing points, and the passenger seats made easily removable.

== Operational history ==
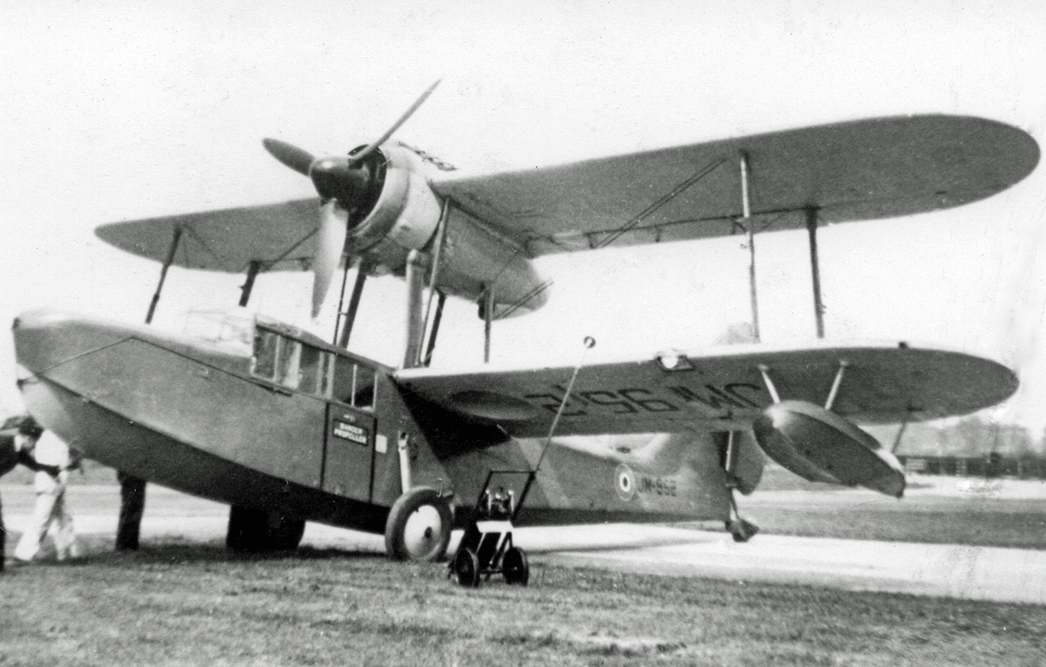
Sea Otter I of the Marine Aircraft Experimental Establishment in 1948

During November 1944, the Sea Otter was introduced to operational service; by the time that the type was inducted by its fourth squadron, the Second World War had ended. The aircraft was primarily operated by both the RAF and the Royal Navy for both air-sea rescue and maritime patrol roles. While the aircraft primarily performed naval reconnaissance missions, it proved to be superior to its Walrus predecessor in the secondary role of retrieving aircrews from the sea. This role comprised a major portion of the Sea Otter's postwar activities into the 1950s.

On 19 July 1950, during the Korean War, Lieutenant P. Cane performed the last operational sea rescue of a Sea Otter, taking off from HMS Triumph (R16). A F4U Corsair had been shot down by anti-aircraft fire, forcing the American pilot to ditch into rough seas. Cane's aircraft landed and the American pilot was rescued. Cane succeeded in returning the Sea Otter to HMS Triumph, and was later awarded the US Air Medal in recognition of his actions.

Overseas military airwings were quick to procure the Sea Otter following the end of the war, often purchasing aircraft from the British Government. The Royal Danish Air Force acquired eight aircraft, while another eight were supplied to the Dutch Naval Aviation Service. Troupes Coloniales, the French colonial service, purchased six Sea Otters, which were operated in French Indochina.

== Variants ==
Sea Otter Mk I
Reconnaissance and communications amphibian aircraft.
Sea Otter Mk II
Air Sea Rescue amphibian aircraft.

== Operators ==
Australia

- Royal Australian Navy
  - No. 723 Squadron RAN received three Sea Otters in 1948, operating them until 1953.

Denmark

- Royal Danish Air Force

Egypt

- Royal Egyptian Air Force

France

- Aeronavale
- Troupes Coloniales operated six ex-RAF aircraft in Indochina between 1947 and 1952.

Netherlands

- Royal Netherlands Navy
  - Dutch Naval Aviation Service including ASR duty aboard the light carrier Karel Doorman (R81)

United Kingdom

- Royal Air Force
  - No. 277 Squadron RAF
  - No. 278 Squadron RAF
  - No. 279 Squadron RAF
  - No. 281 Squadron RAF
  - No. 282 Squadron RAF
  - No. 292 Squadron RAF
  - No. 1350 Flight RAF
  - No. 1351 Flight RAF
  - No. 1352 Flight RAF
  - Marine Aircraft Experimental Establishment
- Royal Navy
  - 700 Naval Air Squadron
  - 712 Naval Air Squadron
  - 716 Naval Air Squadron
  - 721 Naval Air Squadron
  - 723 Naval Air Squadron
  - 728 Naval Air Squadron
  - 729 Naval Air Squadron
  - 733 Naval Air Squadron
  - 740 Naval Air Squadron
  - 742 Naval Air Squadron
  - 744 Naval Air Squadron
  - 771 Naval Air Squadron
  - 772 Naval Air Squadron
  - 778 Naval Air Squadron
  - 781 Naval Air Squadron
  - 799 Naval Air Squadron
  - 810 Naval Air Squadron
  - 1700 Naval Air Squadron
  - 1701 Naval Air Squadron
  - 1702 Naval Air Squadron
  - 1703 Naval Air Squadron

== Surviving aircraft ==
No museum holds a complete aircraft. The Fleet Air Arm Museum (Australia) at Nowra, New South Wales, Australia, has the nose section of JN200, a Sea Otter which served with the Royal Australian Navy.

== Specifications (Sea Otter) ==
Data from Jane's All the World's Aircraft 1947, Supermarine Aircraft since 1914

General characteristics

- Crew: 3–4
- Length: 39 ft 9 in (12.12 m) in rigging position
- Wingspan: 46 ft 0 in (14.02 m)
- Width: 18 ft 0 in (5.49 m) folded
- Height: 16 ft 2 in (4.93 m) with one propeller blade vertically downwards in the rigging position
- Wing area: 610 sq ft (57 m^{2})
- Empty weight: 6,805 lb (3,087 kg) amphibian

6,475 lb (2,937 kg) flying boat

- Gross weight: 10,000 lb (4,536 kg)
- Fuel capacity: 162 imp gal (195 US gal; 740 L) in two upper wing root tanks; 11 imp gal (13 US gal; 50 L) oil

206 imp gal (247 US gal; 940 L) maximum fuel capacity as a flying boat

- Powerplant: 1 × Bristol Mercury XXX nine-cylinder air-cooled radial piston engine, 805 hp (600 kW) for take-off

855 hp (638 kW) maximum at 4,500 ft (1,400 m)
740 hp (550 kW) maximum continuous at 5,000 ft (1,500 m)

- Propellers: 3-bladed Rotol, 11 ft 3 in (3.43 m) diameter constant-speed propeller

Performance

- Maximum speed: 163 mph (262 km/h, 142 kn) at 4,500 ft (1,400 m)
- Cruise speed: 100 mph (160 km/h, 87 kn) at 5,000 ft (1,500 m)
- Range: 565–725 mi (909–1,167 km, 491–630 nmi)
- Ferry range: 920 mi (1,480 km, 800 nmi) with auxiliary overload tank
- Service ceiling: 17,000 ft (5,200 m)
- Rate of climb: 870 ft/min (4.4 m/s)
- Time to altitude: at 5,000 ft (1,500 m) in 6 minutes 12 seconds
- Wing loading: 15.1 lb/sq ft (74 kg/m^{2})
- Power/mass: 0.09 hp/lb (0.15 kW/kg)
- Take-off distance to 50 ft (15 m): 1,665 ft (510 m) from land
- Take-off time from water: 24 seconds

Armament

- Guns: One × .303 in (7.7 mm) Vickers K machine gun in nose and 2 aft
- Bombs: Four × 250 lb (110 kg) bombs

== See also ==
Related development

- Supermarine Walrus

Aircraft of comparable role, configuration, and era

- Grumman J2F Duck

Related lists

- List of aircraft of the Fleet Air Arm
- List of aircraft of the Royal Air Force

== Sources ==
- Andrews, C.F. and E.B. Morgan. Supermarine Aircraft Since 1914. London: Putnam, 1981. ISBN 0-370-10018-2.
- Andrews, C.F. and E.B. Morgan. Supermarine Aircraft since 1914 (2nd ed.). London: Putnam, 1987. ISBN 978-0-85177-800-6.
- Halley, James J. The Squadrons of the Royal Air Force. Tonbridge, Kent, UK: Air Britain (Historians) Ltd., 1980. ISBN 0-85130-083-9.
- Kightly, James. "Database: Supermarine Sea Otter & Seagull". Aeroplane, Vol 50, No. 3, March 2022. pp. 115–129. ISSN 0143-7240.
- Bridgman, Leonard, ed. (1947). Jane's All the World's Aircraft 1947 (35th ed.). London: Sampson Low, Marston & Co. pp. 84c – 85c.
- Sturtivant, Ray and Theo Ballance. The Squadrons of the Fleet Air Arm. Tonbridge, Kent, UK: Air Britain (Historians) Ltd., 1994. ISBN 0-85130-223-8.
