= HMS Neptune (20) =

Leander-class cruiser of the Royal Navy

Coordinates: 33°15′N 13°30′E

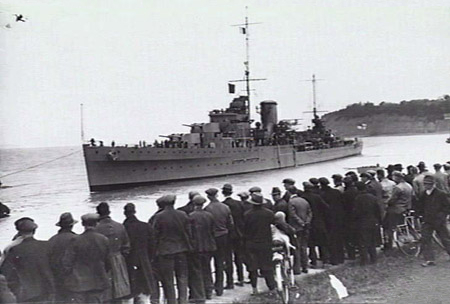
- HMS Neptune in 1937

History

United Kingdom
- Name: HMS Neptune
- Builder: Portsmouth Dockyard
- Laid down: 24 September 1931
- Launched: 31 January 1933
- Commissioned: 12 February 1934
- Identification: Pennant number: 20
- Motto: Regnare est servire; (Latin: "To reign is to serve")
- Fate: Sunk 19 December 1941 by mines off Tripoli

General characteristics
- Class & type: Leander-class light cruiser
- Displacement: 7,270 tons standard; 9,740 tons full load
- Length: 554.9 ft (169.1 m)
- Beam: 56 ft (17 m)
- Draught: 19.1 ft (5.8 m)
- Installed power: 72,000 shaft horsepower (54,000 kW)
- Propulsion: 4 × Parsons geared steam turbines; 6 × Admiralty 3-drum oil-fired boilers; Four shafts
- Speed: 32.5 knots (60 km/h)
- Range: 5,730 nautical miles (10,610 km) at 13 knots (24 km/h)
- Complement: peacetime 550; wartime 680
- Sensors & processing systems: type 284/286 air search radar; type 273/271 surface search; type 285 6 inch (152 mm) fire control; type 282 40 mm fire control
- Armament: Original configuration: 8 × BL 6 inch Mk XXIII naval guns; 4 × 4-inch (102 mm) guns; 12 × 0.5 in machine guns; 8 × 21 inch (533 mm) torpedo tubes
- Armour: 4 in (102 mm) main belt; 2.5 in (64 mm) ends; 1.25 to 2 in (32 to 51 mm) deck; 1 in (25 mm) turrets
- Aircraft carried: One catapult-launched aircraft; Original type was a Fairey Seafox; catapult and aircraft later replaced with Supermarine Walrus

HMS Neptune was a Leander-class light cruiser which served with the Royal Navy during World War II. Neptune was the fourth ship of its class and was the ninth Royal Navy vessel to carry the name. Of her final crew of 765, only one survived to be picked up.

== Construction and commissioning ==
Built by Portsmouth Dockyard, Neptune was laid down on 24 September 1931, launched on 31 January 1933, and commissioned into the Royal Navy on 12 February 1934 with the pennant number 20.

== Operational history ==
During World War II, Neptune operated with a crew drawn predominantly from the New Zealand Division of the Royal Navy. The ship also carried a large contingent of seconded South African personnel.

In December 1939, several months after war was declared, Neptune was patrolling in the South Atlantic in pursuit of German surface raider heavy cruiser Admiral Graf Spee. Neptune, with other patrolling Royal Navy heavy units, was sent to Uruguay in the aftermath of the Battle of the River Plate. However, she was still in transit when the Germans scuttled Graf Spee off Montevideo on 17 December.

Neptune was the first British ship to spot the Italian Fleet in the battle of Calabria, on 9 July 1940, marking also the first time since the Napoleonic Wars that the Mediterranean Fleet received the signal "enemy battle fleet in sight". During the subsequent engagement, she was hit by the Italian light cruiser Giuseppe Garibaldi. The 6-inch shell splinters struck the aircraft catapult and damaged her floatplane beyond repair, its wreckage being thrown into the sea. Minutes later, Neptune's main guns scored three hits on the heavy cruiser Bolzano, inflicting some damage on her torpedo room, below the waterline and the "B" turret. During 1941, she led Force K, a raiding squadron of cruisers. Their task was to intercept and destroy German and Italian convoys en route to Libya. The convoys were supplying Rommel's Afrika Korps in North Africa with troops and equipment.

=== Sinking ===
Force K was sent out on 18 December 1941, to intercept a convoy bound for Tripoli, right after the brief fleet engagement at sunset known as First Battle of Sirte.

On the night of 19–20 December, Neptune, leading the line, struck two mines, part of an Italian minefield laid by an Italian cruiser force in June 1941. The first struck the anti-mine screen, causing no damage. The second struck the bow hull. The other cruisers present, Aurora and Penelope, also struck mines.

While reversing out of the minefield, Neptune struck a third mine, which took off her propellers and left her dead in the water. Aurora was unable to render assistance as she was already down to 10 knots (19 km/h) and needed to turn back to Malta. Penelope was also unable to assist.

The destroyers Kandahar and Lively were sent into the minefield to attempt a tow. The former struck a mine and began drifting. Neptune then signalled for Lively to keep clear. Kandahar was later evacuated and scuttled with a torpedo by the destroyer Jaguar, to prevent her capture.

Neptune hit a fourth mine and quickly capsized, killing 737 crew members. Initially some 30 others survived the sinking, but they also died of wounds and exposure in the subsequent days. As a result, only one was still alive when their carley float was picked up five days later by the Italian torpedo boat Generale Achille Papa. The sole survivor, Norman Walton, spent 15 months in an Italian prisoner of war camp. In 1991, Walton travelled to the small city of Nelson, New Zealand, to unveil a memorial to Neptune. Of the 764 that perished, 150 were New Zealand sailors, including four from Nelson. A memorial service to Neptune and her crew is held each year in Nelson.

== See also ==
- First Battle of Sirte
