= List of Royal Air Force stations =

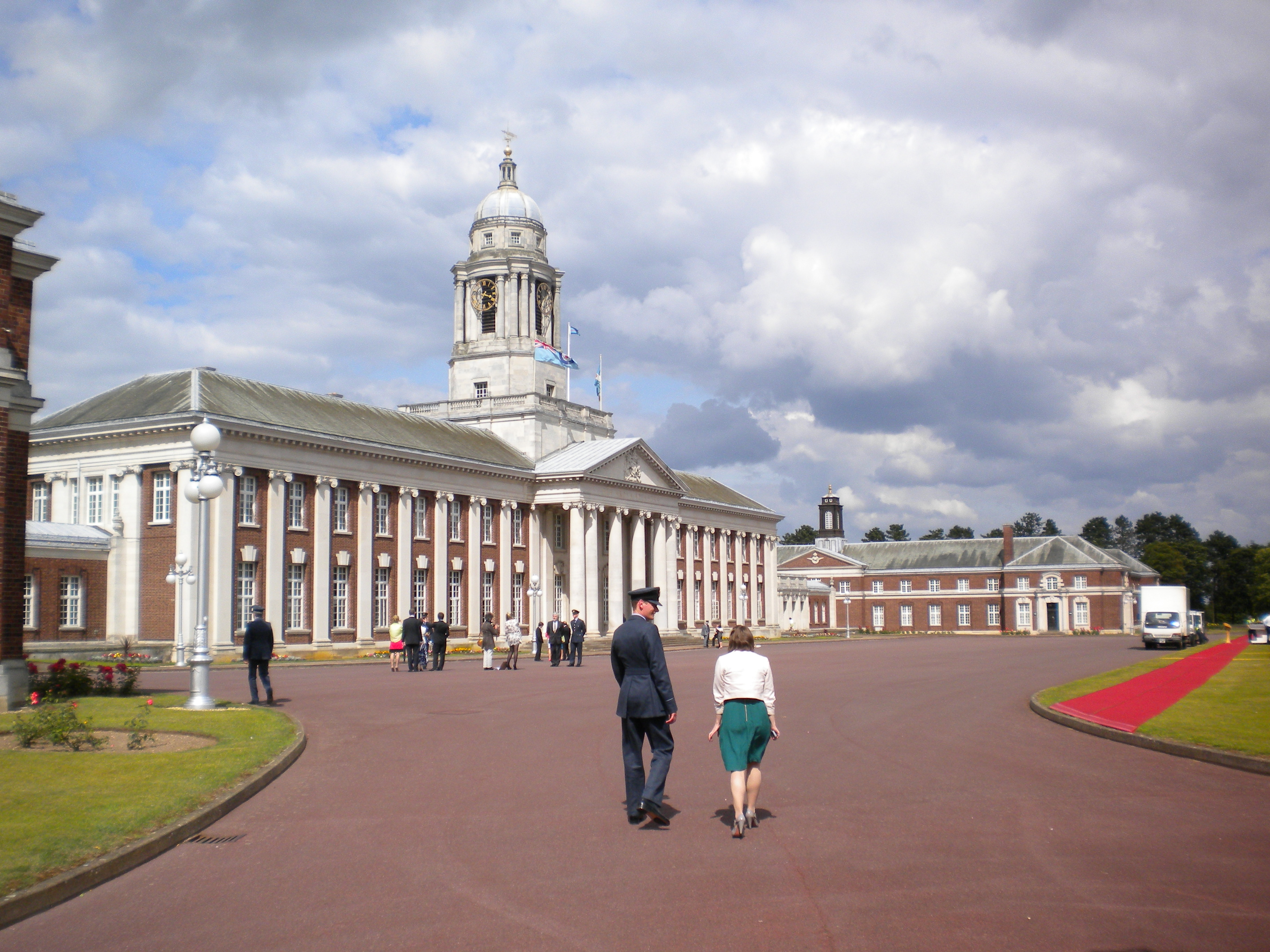
RAF Cranwell College Hall

This list of Royal Air Force stations lists all current stations of the Royal Air Force (RAF) throughout the United Kingdom and overseas. This includes front-line and training airbases, support, administrative and training stations with no flying activity, unmanned airfields used for training, intelligence gathering stations and an early warning radar network.

The list includes RAF stations occupied by the United States Visiting Forces, former RAF stations now operated by defence contractor QinetiQ on behalf of the Ministry of Defence (MOD), and air weapons ranges operated by the MOD.

Overseas, the RAF operates airfields at four Permanent Joint Operating Bases (PJOBs) at British Overseas Territories.

== RAF stations and MOD airfields in the UK ==
=== Royal Air Force ===
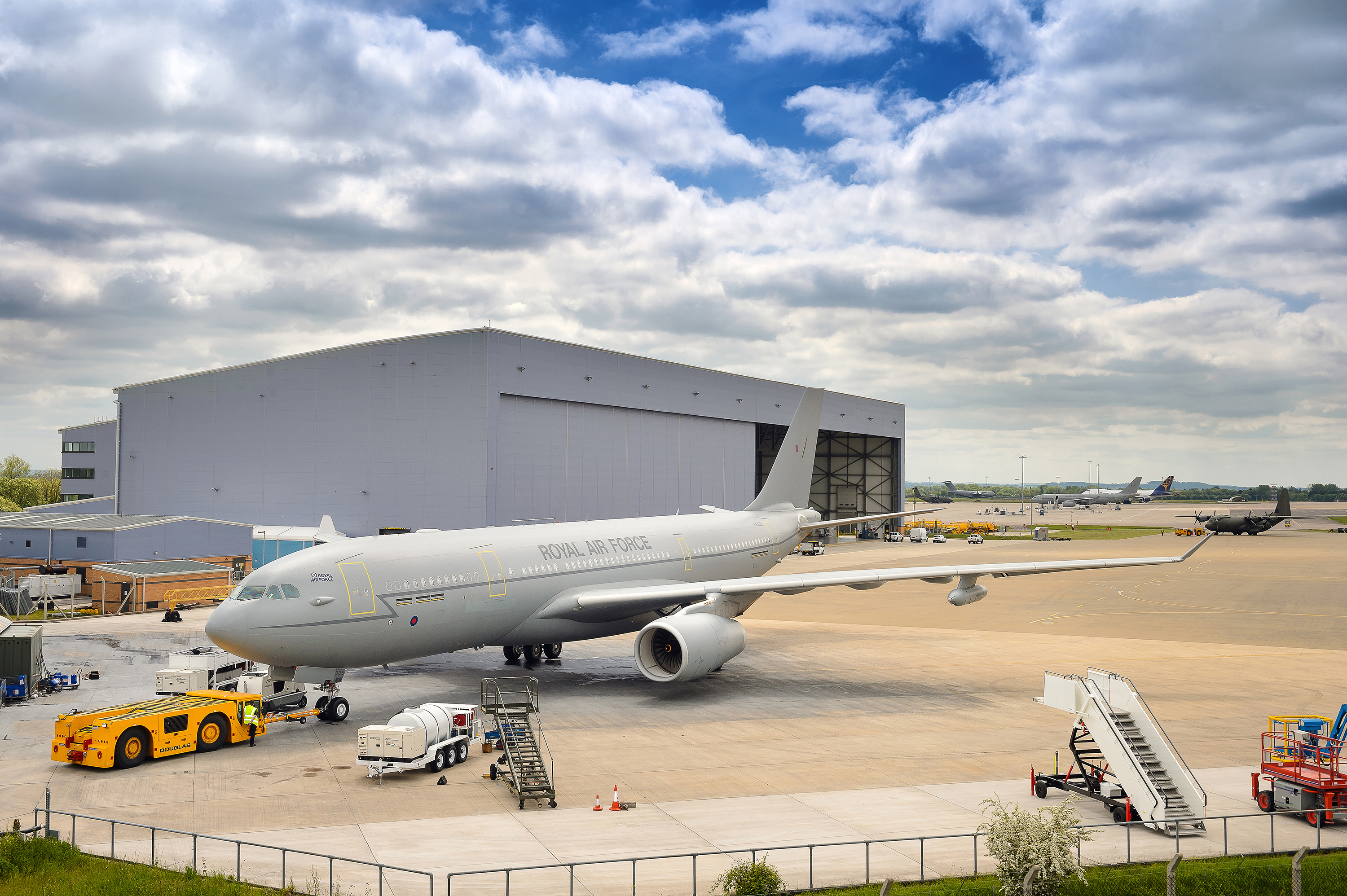
A RAF Voyager at RAF Brize Norton.

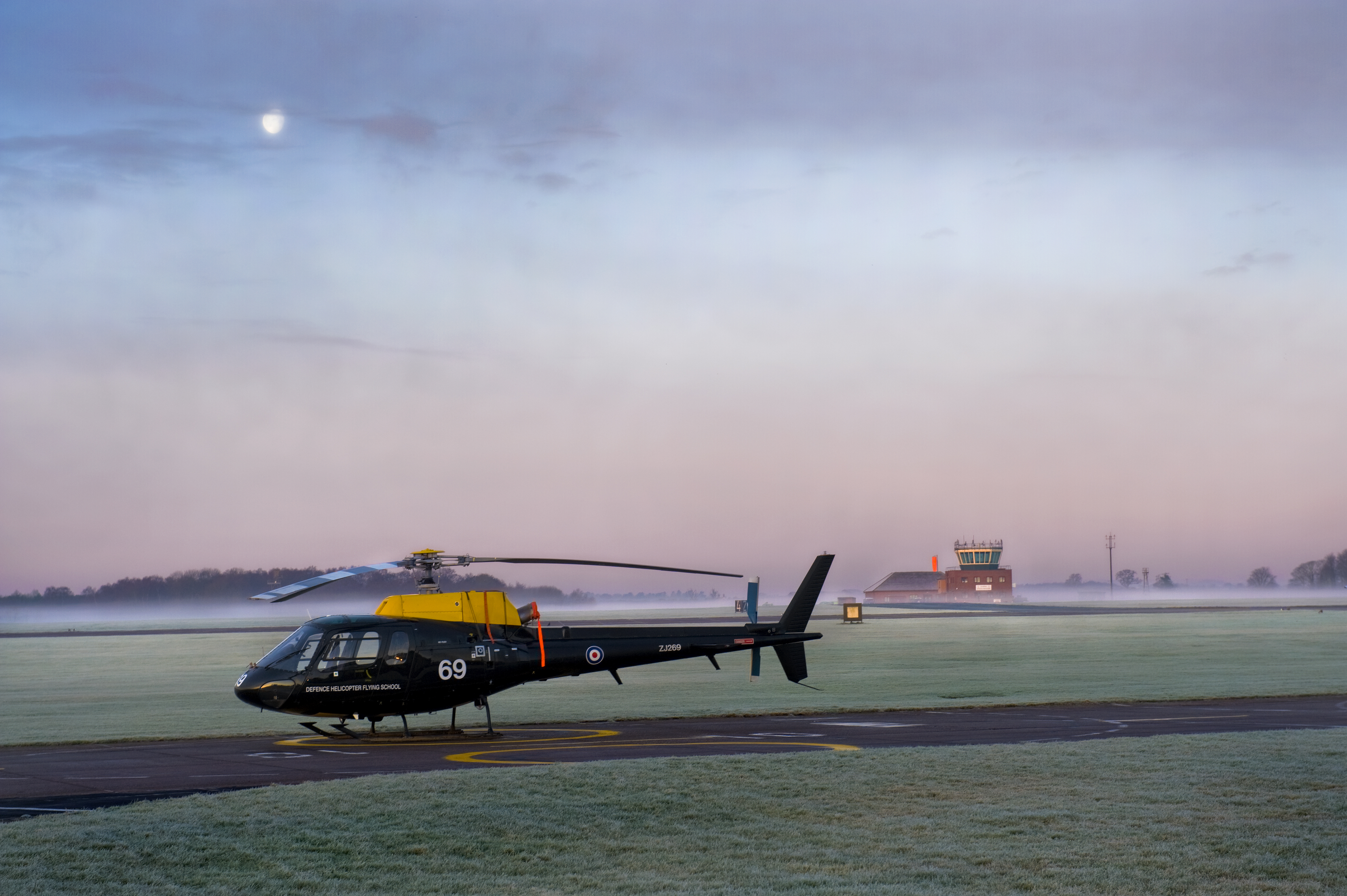
A Eurocopter Squirrel HT1 at RAF Shawbury.

RAF front-line operations are centred on seven main operating bases (MOBs):

- RAF Coningsby, RAF Marham, and RAF Lossiemouth — Air Combat
- RAF Waddington — Combat Intelligence, Surveillance Target Acquisition and Reconnaissance
- RAF Brize Norton — Air Transport
- RAF Benson and RAF Odiham — Support Helicopter Force, operating under Joint Aviation Command

Operations are supported by numerous other flying and non-flying stations, with activity centred at RAF Honington which coordinates Force Protection, and RAF Leeming and RAF Wittering which have a support enabler role.

Stations such as RAF Cranwell, RAF Valley and RAF Shawbury form part of the UK Military Flying Training System, which is dedicated to training aircrew for all three UK armed services. Specialist ground crew training takes place at RAF Cosford and MOD St Athan.

The Control and Reporting Centre (CRC) at RAF Boulmer compiles a Recognised Air Picture of UK airspace and provides tactical control of the Quick Reaction Alert Force. Boulmer is supported by a network of seven Remote Radar Heads (RRHs) spread throughout the UK.

=== Ministry of Defence ===
Several former RAF stations are owned by the Ministry of Defence (MOD), and are operated by defence contractor QinetiQ in the test and evaluation role. The main facility is MOD Boscombe Down in Wiltshire, which has a significant RAF presence.

A small number of former RAF stations remain in MOD ownership even though they are used by the RAF in the relief landing ground (RLG) role, flying by Volunteer Gliding Squadrons or other training purposes. They are described as airfields and are typically unmanned.

=== RAF stations ===
Name	Constituent country	County	Units and purpose
RAF Barkston Heath	England	Lincolnshire	Defence Elementary Flying Training School under the UK Military Flying Training System. Also serves as a relief landing ground for No. 3 Flying Training School at RAF Cranwell.
RAF Benson	England	Oxfordshire	Home to No. 28 Squadron, the Chinook HC6A operational conversion unit, and No. 22 Squadron, the Joint Aviation Command helicopter operational evaluation unit.
RAF Boulmer	England	Northumberland	Non-flying station, home to the RAF Battlespace Management Force, UK Air Surveillance and Control System (UKASCS), and a NATO Control and Reporting Centre responsible for monitoring UK airspace.
RAF Brize Norton	England	Oxfordshire	The RAF's largest station, home to the strategic and tactical air-transport and air-to-air refuelling fleets (Boeing C-17A Globemaster, Airbus Voyager KC2/KC3, and the Airbus A400M Atlas, and latterly Lockheed Martin C-130 Hercules C4/5 until their retirement in 2023).
RAF Coningsby	England	Lincolnshire	Eurofighter Typhoon FGR4 main operating base, with No. 3 Squadron and No. 11 Squadron both contributing to the Quick Reaction Alert (Interceptor) South capability. No. 29 Squadron is the Typhoon operational conversion unit, and No. 41 Squadron operate the Typhoon for test and evaluation purposes. Also home to the Battle of Britain Memorial Flight, which operates a fleet of historic fighter, bomber and training aircraft in the flying display role.
RAF Cosford	England	Shropshire	Training establishment, home to the Defence School of Aeronautical Engineering (DSAE) Headquarters, No. 1 School of Technical Training, the RAF Aerosystems Engineer and Management Training School, No. 1 Radio School, Defence School of Photography, and the RAF School of Physical Training. Flying units include the University of Birmingham Air Squadron, No. 8 Air Experience Flight. Also home to the RAF Museum Cosford.
RAF Cranwell	England	Lincolnshire	Training establishment, home to RAF College Cranwell (RAFC Cranwell), the Officer and Aircrew Selection Centre (OASC), and Air Cadets Headquarters. Flying units comprise the Central Flying School responsible for training flying instructors, the headquarters and flying squadrons of No. 3 Flying Training School (Embraer Phenom T1 and Grob Prefect T1) and No. 6 Flying Training School flying the Grob Tutor T1.
RAF Digby	England	Lincolnshire	Non-flying station providing specialist communications support under command of Defence Intelligence. Station personnel are drawn from all three branches of the UK armed forces, along with the U.S. National Security Agency. Home to the Joint Services Signals Organisation Headquarters, Joint Signals Service Unit (Digby), No. 591 Signals Unit, and the Aerial Erector School.
RAF Fylingdales	England	North Yorkshire	Non-flying station providing an uninterrupted ballistic missile early warning and space surveillance capability to the UK and US governments.
RAF Halton	England	Buckinghamshire	Training establishment comprising the Recruit Training Squadron, Airmen's Command Squadron, International Defence Training, Supply and Management Training Wing, Specialist Training School, and several other RAF and joint support units. A grass airfield provides a base for several RAF flying clubs. Expected to close and be disposed of by 2030.
RAF Henlow	England	Bedfordshire	Support station, home to specialist RAF and Strategic Command units, including the RAF Centre of Aviation Medicine, the Joint Arms Control Implementation Group (JACIG), and Forensic Exploitation Flight. Expected to close and be disposed of by 2026.
RAF High Wycombe	England	Buckinghamshire	Non-flying administrative support station, home to Headquarters RAF Air Command, No. 1 Group, No. 2 Group, No. 11 Group, and No. 22 Group.
RAF Honington	England	Suffolk	Support station, hosts initial and further training for, and is home to the RAF Regiment. The majority of the RAF Regiment, including the Combat Readiness Force Headquarters and Force Protection Centre, and numerous RAF Regiment, RAF Police, and RAuxAF squadrons are based here. Also hosts RAF Police Headquarters and the Specialist Police Wing.
RAF Leeming	England	North Yorkshire	Home to the Yorkshire Universities Air Squadron, Northumbrian Universities Air Squadron, and both No. 9 and No. 11 Air Experience Flight, sharing the Grob Tutor T1. Non-flying units include No. 607 (County of Durham) Squadron (RAuxAF) No. 85 (Expeditionary Logistics) Wing, No. 90 Signals Unit, No. 2 Force Protection Wing, No. 34 Squadron RAF Regiment, No. 609 (West Riding) Squadron (RAuxAF), and the Joint Forward Air Controller Training and Standards Unit (JFACTSU).
RAF Lossiemouth	Scotland	Moray	Eurofighter Typhoon FGR4 main operating base, with No. 1 Squadron, No. 2 (AC) Squadron, No. 6 Squadron, and No. 9 Squadron, contributing to the Quick Reaction Alert (Interceptor) North capability. No. 8 Squadron operate the Wedgetail AEW1, No. 120 Squadron and No. 201 Squadron operate the P-8A Poseidon maritime patrol aircraft. No. 5 Force Protection Wing HQ, No. 51 Squadron RAF Regiment, and No. 2622 (Highland) Squadron (RAuxAF) operate in the force protection role.
RAF Marham	England	Norfolk	F-35B Lightning II main operating base, home to No. 207 Squadron and No. 617 Squadron. Non-flying units include No. 3 Force Protection Wing HQ, No. 93 Expeditionary Armament Squadron, and No. 2620 (County of Norfolk) Squadron (RAuxAF).
RAF Mona	Wales	Isle of Anglesey	Relief Landing Ground (RLG) for training aircraft operating from RAF Valley.
RAF Northolt	England	Greater London	Home of No. 32 (The Royal) Squadron operating the Envoy IV CC1 in the Command Support Air Transport (CSAT) role. Also home to No. 63 Squadron (King's Colour Squadron) RAF Regiment, No. 600 (City of London) Squadron (RAuxAF), No. 1 Aeronautical Information Documents Unit (AIDU), and the Headquarters Music Services and the Central Band of the RAF. Several other military units are based at Northolt, including the British Forces Post Office and No. 621 (EOD) Squadron of the Royal Logistics Corps.
RAF Odiham	England	Hampshire	Home of the RAF's Chinook fleet operating under Joint Aviation Command, comprising No. 7 Squadron, No. 18 Squadron, and No. 27 Squadron.
RAF Shawbury	England	Shropshire	Home of the tri-service No. 1 Flying Training School, comprising No. 60 Squadron RAF, No. 660 Squadron AAC, and 705 Naval Air Squadron FAA, flying the Airbus Juno HT1. Elements of the Central Flying School (Helicopter) Squadron train helicopter flying instructors, and the School of Air Operations Control (SAOC) trains air traffic controllers for the RAF and Royal Navy.
RAF Spadeadam	England	Cumbria	RAF Spadeadam is the only electronic warfare tactics facility in Europe used by NATO and British aircrews to practice tactics. It is the largest RAF base by area, at 9,600 acres.
RAF St Mawgan	England	Cornwall	Non-flying station with its airfield part now operating as Newquay Airport. The station is home to the tri-service Defence Survive, Evade, Resist, Extract Training Organisation and No. 505 (Wessex) Squadron RAuxAF. Also used by the Defence Infrastructure Organisation to accommodate personnel utilising the Defence Training Estate within the south west of England.
RAF Syerston	England	Nottinghamshire	Home of No. 2 Flying Training School headquarters, the Central Gliding School, and No. 644 Volunteer Gliding Squadron.
RAF Topcliffe	England	North Yorkshire	Former larger RAF station, now an enclave within the British Army's Alanbrooke Barracks, with the airfield retained by the RAF and used by No. 645 Volunteer Gliding Squadron teaching Air Cadets to fly the Grob Viking.
RAF Valley	Wales	Isle of Anglesey	Flying training station home to No. 4 Flying Training School, comprising No. 4 Squadron and No. 25 Squadron operating the BAE Systems Hawk T2 and No. 72 Squadron operating the Texan T1. Also No. 202 Squadron, part of No. 1 Flying Training School, operates the Airbus Jupiter HT1 in the maritime and mountain flying training role. The station is also home to the RAF Mountain Rescue Service headquarters.
RAF Waddington	England	Lincolnshire	Main operating base, home to the RAF's Intelligence, Surveillance, Target Acquisition and Reconnaissance (ISTAR) operations. No. 13 Squadron operate the General Atomics Protector RG1, No. 14 Squadron the Beechcraft Shadow R1, and No. 51 Squadron the Boeing RC-135V Rivet Joint. No. 54 Squadron is the ISTAR training unit, and No. 56 Squadron is the ISTAR test and evaluation unit. Non-flying squadrons and units include No. 2503 (County of Lincoln) Squadron RAuxAF Regiment, the RAF Air Battlespace Training Centre, RAF Air and Space Warfare Centre, the headquarters of the intelligence reserves, and No. 7006 (VR) Intelligence Squadron.
RAF Weston-on-the-Green	England	Oxfordshire	Force Development Training Centre, used by No. 1 Parachute Training School (based at nearby RAF Brize Norton) as a parachute drop-zone.
RAF Wittering	England	Cambridgeshire and Northamptonshire	Support station accommodating elements of the RAF Support Force which supports deployed and expeditionary air operations, and comprises a variety of units under No. 42 (Expeditionary Support) Wing and No. 85 (Expeditionary Logistics) Wing. Flying units consist of No. 16 Squadron of No. 3 Flying Training School and No. 115 Squadron, University of London Air Squadron, Cambridge University Air Squadron, and No. 5 Air Experience Flight of No. 6 Flying Training School, all flying the Grob Tutor T1.
RAF Woodvale	England	Merseyside	Training station home to Liverpool University Air Squadron, Manchester and Salford Universities Air Squadron, and No. 10 Air Experience Flight, all flying the Grob Tutor T1, along with No. 631 Volunteer Gliding Squadron. The Station is also home to No. 611 (West Lancashire) Squadron RAuxAF.
RAF Wyton	England	Cambridgeshire	Non-flying intelligence station operated under Strategic Command, home to the National Centre for Geospatial Intelligence (NCGI) of Defence Intelligence and 42 Engineer Regiment (Geographic) of the British Army.

=== Non-RAF stations used by the RAF ===
These are MOD or British Army facilities (most former RAF stations) listed in recognition of the RAF retaining a presence at each site.

Name	Constituent country	County	Units and purpose
MOD Aberporth	Wales	Ceredigion	Former RAE Aberporth, now operated by QinetiQ on behalf of the MOD as a test and evaluation range.
MOD Boscombe Down	England	Wiltshire	Test and evaluation airbase operated by QinetiQ on behalf of the MOD. Home to the Air Test and Evaluation Centre, Empire Test Pilots School, Rotary Wing Test and Evaluation Squadron, and the Joint Aircraft Recovery and Transportation Squadron.
MOD Hebrides	Scotland	Outer Hebrides	Deep sea range for complex weapons trials, currently operated by QinetiQ on behalf of the MOD as a test and evaluation range.
MOD St. Athan	Wales	Vale of Glamorgan	Training station (formerly RAF St. Athan), home to No. 4 School of Technical Training and the University of Wales Air Squadron flying the Grob Tutor T1.
MOD West Freugh	Scotland	Dumfries and Galloway	Former RAF station, now operated by QinetiQ on behalf of the MOD as a test and evaluation range. Its airfield is disused and unlicensed, but available for military exercises.
Aldergrove Flying Station	Northern Ireland	County Antrim	Formerly RAF Aldergrove, the station is now a British Army facility. The RAF maintains a presence with the Northern Ireland Universities Air Squadron and No. 13 Air Experience Flight operating the Grob Tutor T1 and No. 502 (Ulster) Squadron (Royal Auxiliary Air Force).
Kenley Airfield	England	Surrey	Former RAF station, currently home to No. 615 Volunteer Gliding Squadron flying the Grob Viking T1.
Keevil Airfield	England	Wiltshire	Former RAF station, now an unmanned airfield used for training purposes predominantly by aircraft from RAF Brize Norton. It is also used by the British Army for ground exercises, by Joint Aviation Command, and by 47th Regiment Royal Artillery to fly the Watchkeeper UAV.
Kirknewton Airfield	Scotland	Midlothian	Former RAF station, home to No. 661 Volunteer Gliding Squadron flying the Grob Viking T1.
Leuchars Station	Scotland	Fife	Relief Landing Ground (RLG) for RAF Lossiemouth, maintained by a small number of RAF personnel operating the airfield and air traffic control radar. This former RAF station is now a British Army barracks, but continues to accommodate the East of Scotland Universities Air Squadron and No. 12 Air Experience Flight (both flying the Grob Tutor T1), and No. 612 (County of Aberdeen) Squadron (Royal Auxiliary Air Force) in the medical support role.
Little Rissington Airfield	England	Gloucestershire	Former RAF station, currently home to No. 621 Volunteer Gliding Squadron and No. 637 Volunteer Gliding Squadron. It is also used for military training exercises.
London Area Control Centre	England	Hampshire	No. 78 Squadron is embedded in the civilian London Area Control Centre operated by NATS at Swanwick. It provides a military air traffic control service across the UK, operates the UK's Distress and Diversion Cell, and provides air traffic control services for RAF Northolt.
Ternhill Airfield	England	Shropshire	Former RAF station, unmanned airfield now used primarily for training purposes and as a Relief Landing Ground for helicopters of the No. 1 Flying Training School.
Upavon Airfield	England	Wiltshire	Formerly RAF Upavon now known as Upavon Station, north site now operated by the British Army as Trenchard Lines, airfield used by No. 622 Volunteer Gliding Squadron which teaches Air Cadets to fly the Grob Viking T1.

=== Remote Radar Heads ===
Remote Radar Heads (RRHs) are the UK's air defence radar sites. The RRHs can now be monitored centrally with only limited on-site radar maintenance support. This has enabled the release of the majority of RAF personnel previously based permanently at these locations. The sites are maintained and operated primarily by Serco. The MOD finished installing new state-of-the-art communications buildings, radar towers and bespoke perimeter security on the sites in 2023 under Programme HYDRA.

Name	Constituent country	County	Units and purpose
RRH Benbecula	Scotland	Outer Hebrides	Remote Radar Head (formerly RAF Benbecula) forming part of the UK Air Surveillance and Control System managed from RAF Boulmer.
RRH Brizlee Wood	England	Northumberland	Remote Radar Head (formerly RAF Brizlee Wood) forming part of the UK Air Surveillance and Control System managed from RAF Boulmer.
RRH Buchan	Scotland	Aberdeenshire	Remote Radar Head (formerly RAF Buchan) forming part of the UK Air Surveillance and Control System managed from RAF Boulmer.
RRH Neatishead	England	Norfolk	Remote Radar Head (formerly RAF Neatishead), forming part of the UK Air Surveillance and Control System managed from RAF Boulmer.
RRH Portreath	England	Cornwall	Remote Radar Head (formerly RAF Portreath) forming part of the UK Air Surveillance and Control System managed from RAF Boulmer.
RRH Staxton Wold	England	North Yorkshire	Remote Radar Head (formerly RAF Staxton Wold) forming part of the UK Air Surveillance and Control System managed from RAF Boulmer.
RRH Saxa Vord	Scotland	Shetland Islands	Remote Radar Head (formerly RAF Saxa Vord) forming part of the UK Air Surveillance and Control System managed from RAF Boulmer.

== RAF stations operated by the United States Visiting Forces ==
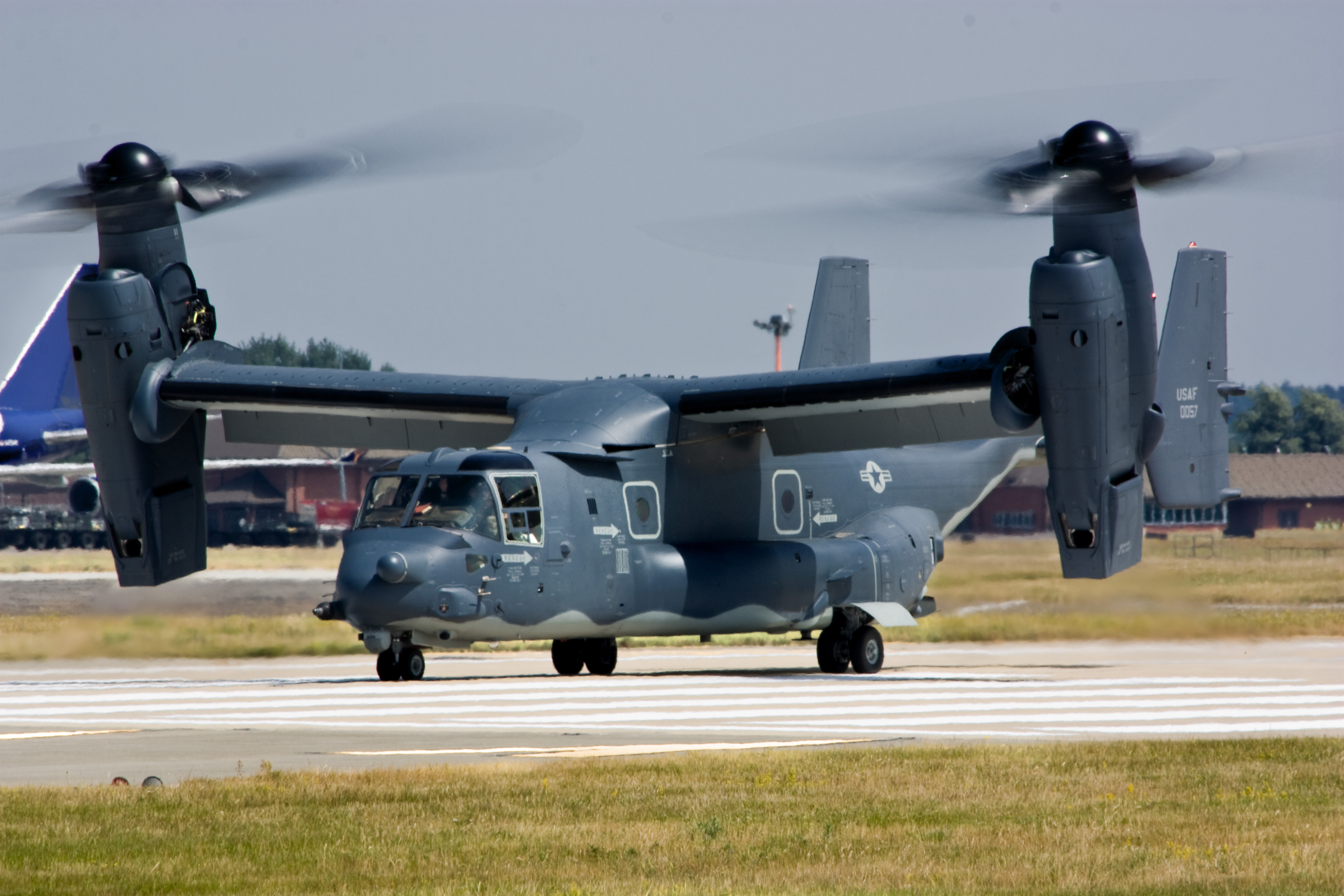
A CV-22B Osprey of the US Air Force's 352nd Special Operations Wing at RAF Mildenhall, 2013.

At the invitation of the UK Government, the United States has had military forces, known as US Visiting Forces, permanently stationed in the United Kingdom since the Second World War. The 1951 NATO Status of Forces Agreement and the Visiting Forces Act 1952, along with other bilateral acts, establishes the legal status of the USVF in the UK. Several military sites within England are made available for the USVF's purposes.

A Royal Air Force commander is present at the main USVF sites, and is normally of the rank of Squadron Leader. A US Colonel will normally command US personnel at each station. The role of the RAF commander is to liaise with the US base commander, and act as head of establishment for Ministry of Defence employees. The use of UK bases for combat operations by the United States is a joint decision by both governments.

The United States Air Force (USAF) 501st Combat Support Wing manages and supports operations at RAF Alconbury, RAF Croughton, RAF Fairford, RAF Menwith Hill, RAF Molesworth, and RAF Welford, whereas RAF Lakenheath and RAF Mildenhall are managed by their respective host wings.

Name	Constituent country	County	Units and purpose
RAF Alconbury	England	Cambridgeshire	Non-flying station home to the USAF 423rd Air Base Group (part of the 501st Combat Support Wing) which provides services and accommodation to support operations at RAF Molesworth and the Joint Warfare Centre, Stavanger in Norway.
RAF Barford St John	England	Oxfordshire	Non-flying station operated as a signals intelligence relay station by the USAF. The facility is a satellite station of RAF Croughton and controlled remotely.
RAF Croughton	England	Northamptonshire	Non-flying station operated as a signals intelligence facility by the USAF and US intelligence agencies. The station is operated by the USAF 422nd Air Base Group (part of the 501st Combat Support Wing).
RAF Fairford	England	Gloucestershire	Forward operating airfield predominantly used by USAF heavy bombers such as the B-1B Lancer, B-2A Spirit and B-52H Stratofortress. The station is operated by the USAF 420th Air Base Squadron, 422nd Air Base Group (part of the 501st Combat Support Wing).
RAF Feltwell	England	Norfolk	Non-flying station, operated as an intelligence gathering facility by a detachment of the US Space Force's 73rd Intelligence, Surveillance and Reconnaissance Squadron, which is assigned to Space Delta 7. Feltwell is parented by the 48th Fighter Wing at RAF Lakenheath.
RAF Lakenheath	England	Suffolk	Home to the USAF 48th Fighter Wing, operating the F-15C/D Eagle, F-15E Strike Eagle, and F-35A Lightning II.
RAF Menwith Hill	England	North Yorkshire	Joint UK / US signals intelligence gathering station which functions primarily as a field station of the US National Security Agency. Operations are supported by the USAF 421st Air Base Squadron which is part of the 501st Combat Support Wing.
RAF Mildenhall	England	Suffolk	Home to the USAF 100th Air Refuelling Wing operating the KC-135R Stratotanker, and the 352nd Special Operations Wing operating the CV-22 Osprey and MC-130J Commando II. The 95th Reconnaissance Squadron supports RC-135 aircraft when deployed to Europe and operating from the station.
RAF Molesworth	England	Cambridgeshire	Non-flying station, home to the Joint Intelligence Operations Center Europe (JIOCEUR) Analytic Center operated by the US Defense Intelligence Agency and the J2 Directorate which provides US Africa Command with intelligence. The station is supported by the USAF 423rd Air Base Group (part of the 501st Combat Support Wing).
RAF Welford	England	Berkshire	Non-flying station used as ammunition depot in support of bomber operating from RAF Fairford. The station is operated by the USAF 420th Munitions Squadron (part of the 501st Combat Support Wing).

== MOD air weapons ranges ==
Air weapons ranges (AWR) within the United Kingdom, previously operated by the Royal Air Force, are the responsibility of the Service Delivery (SD) part of the Defence Infrastructure Organisation (DIO). In 2010, QinetiQ were awarded a three-year contract by the DIO to manage the ranges. In 2014, this role was taken over by Landmarc Support Services, part of Interserve, as part of a contract covering the wider MOD Defence Training Estate.

Name	Constituent country	County	Units and purpose
DIO (SD) Cape Wrath	Scotland	Highland	Parented by DIO (SD) Tain.
DIO (SD) Donna Nook Air Weapons Range	England	Lincolnshire	Parented by RAF Coningsby.
DIO (SD) Holbeach Air Weapons Range	England	Lincolnshire	Parented by RAF Marham.
DIO (SD) Pembrey Sands Air Weapons Range	Wales	Carmarthenshire	
DIO (SD) Tain Air Weapons Range	Scotland	Highland	Parented by RAF Lossiemouth.

== Map of stations within the UK ==
A map of the United Kingdom showing active RAF stations, Ministry of Defence (MOD) airfields (non-Royal Navy or Army Air Corps), MOD air weapons ranges and RAF stations occupied by the United States Visiting Forces (USVF).

Flying Station Training Station Support Station UK Air Surveillance And Control System Sites Air Weapons Range MOD Aeronautical Test and Evaluation Site US Air Force Installation
WOTG = Weston-on-the-Green, LN = Lakenheath

== Overseas ==
=== Permanent Joint Operating Bases ===
The United Kingdom operates Permanent Joint Operating Bases (PJOBs) in four British Overseas Territories, namely Ascension Island, the Sovereign Base Areas of Akrotiri and Dhekelia in Cyprus, the Falkland Islands and Gibraltar.

The Falkland Islands have three Remote Radar Heads, forming part of an early warning and airspace control network.

The PJOBs contribute to the physical defence and maintenance of sovereignty of these British Overseas Territories and enable the UK to conduct expeditionary military operations.

The Director of Overseas Bases, Strategic Command, controls and oversees the PJOBs.

Royal Air Force stations and installations worldwide.

Permanent Joint Operating Base

Name	Country	Units and purpose
RAF Akrotiri	Sovereign Base Areas of Akrotiri and Dhekelia	Permanent Joint Operating Base acting as a strategic staging airfield to support British military operations in the Middle East. It is operated by the Cyprus Operations Support Unit (COSU).; No. 903 Expeditionary Air Wing was established in December 2014 to support combat and support aircraft on detachment to the airbase as part of Operation Shader.; No. 84 Squadron.
RAF Ascension Island	Saint Helena, Ascension and Tristan da Cunha	Also known as Wideawake Airfield, this Permanent Joint Operating Base predominately operating as a staging post for the air-bridge between RAF Brize Norton in Oxfordshire and RAF Mount Pleasant in the Falkland Islands. Also used by the United States Space Force (USSF) and NASA as a communications and satellite tracking station.
RAF Gibraltar	Gibraltar	Permanent Joint Operating Base acting as a strategic staging airfield. Also functions as Gibraltar International Airport which comprises a civilian passenger terminal operated by Government of Gibraltar.
RAF Mount Pleasant	Falkland Islands	Permanent Joint Operating Base opened in 1985 after the Falklands War. No. 905 Expeditionary Air Wing operates four permanently based Typhoon FGR4s, one Voyager KC2, one A400M Atlas, and civilian-crewed support and search and rescue helicopters.
RRH Byron Heights	Falkland Islands	Remote Radar Head located on West Falkland.
RRH Mount Alice	Falkland Islands	Remote Radar Head located on West Falkland.
RRH Mount Kent	Falkland Islands	Remote Radar Head located on East Falkland.

=== Overseas operations ===
The Royal Air Force has a presence at several overseas locations. Active military operations in the Middle East are supported by Expeditionary Air Wings (EAW) which have been established at foreign airfields in the United Arab Emirates and Qatar. The RAF has a presence within Eastern European countries on a rotational basis as part of NATO's Baltic Air Policing and Southern Air Policing missions. No. 17 Test and Evaluation Squadron is located in the United States at Edwards Air Force Base in California, where test and evaluation of the F-35B Lightning II is undertaken. Donnelly Lines, a permanent UK military facility at a United Arab Emirates (UAE) air base, was opened in 2024.

Royal Air Force stations and installations worldwide.

Overseas Base

Name	Country	Units and purpose
Ämari Air Base	Estonia	The RAF has contributed to NATO's Baltic Air Policing mission in Estonia on a rotational basis, most recently providing Quick Reaction Alert with Typhoon FGR4s in 2023.
Mihail Kogalniceanu Air Base	Romania	The RAF has contributed to NATO's Southern Air Policing mission on a rotational basis, most recently providing Quick Reaction Alert with Typhoon FGR4s in 2024.
Šiauliai Air Base	Lithuania	The RAF has contributed to NATO's Baltic Air Policing mission in Lithuania on a rotational basis, most recently providing Quick Reaction Alert with Typhoon FGR4s in 2020.
Keflavik Airport	Iceland	The RAF has contributed to NATO's Icelandic Air Policing mission on a rotational basis, most recently providing Quick Reaction Alert with F-35 Lightning IIs in 2024.
Al Udeid Air Base	Qatar	No. 83 Expeditionary Air Group was established in April 2006 as the headquarters for all RAF assets in the Middle East, and is responsible for UK air operations as part of Operation Kipon and Operation Shader.
Edwards Air Force Base	United States	No. 17 Squadron formed at Edwards in April 2013 to test and evaluate the Lockheed Martin F-35B Lightning II.
Medicina Lines	Brunei	British Army garrison and headquarters of British Forces Brunei, home to No. 230 Squadron.
Troodos Station	Cyprus	Signals intelligence gathering and radar station located in the Troodos Mountains, outside the Sovereign Base Areas. Operated by Golf Section of the Joint Service Signal Unit (Cyprus).
Donnelly Lines, Al Minhad Air Base	United Arab Emirates	No. 906 Expeditionary Air Wing was established in January 2013 to provide an air transport and refuelling hub in the Middle East. A permanent British headquarters with accommodation and welfare facilities was opened in 2024 as Donnelly Lines.
RAFO Musannah	Oman	No. 902 Expeditionary Air Wing since May 2015

== See also ==
- Structure of the Royal Air Force
- List of air stations of the Royal Navy
- List of airfields of the Army Air Corps (United Kingdom)
- List of airports in the United Kingdom and the British Crown Dependencies
- List of Royal Navy shore establishments
- List of British Army installations
- List of United States Air Force installations
