= 744 Naval Air Squadron =

Test and evaluation squadron of the Royal Navy's Fleet Air Arm

- Squadron badge
- Active: 1 March 1943 - 1 June 1944; 6 March 1944 - 1 December 1947; 20 July 1951 - 1 March 1954; 1 March 1954 - 31 October 1956; 14 November 2018 - present
- Country: United Kingdom
- Branch: Royal Navy
- Type: Fleet Air Arm Second Line Squadron
- Role: Air Gunner Training Squadron; Merchant Aircraft Carrier and Anti-Submarine training; Anti-Submarine Trials and Development Unit; Mission Systems and Armament Test and Evaluation Squadron; Joint Uncrewed Air System Test and Evaluation Squadron
- Part of: Fleet Air Arm and Air and Space Warfare Centre
- Home station: MOD Boscombe Down
- Mottos: Nemo solus satis sapit (Latin for 'No one or man knows enough')
- Aircraft: See Aircraft flown section for full list.
- Website: Official website

Commanders
- Current commander: Commander Tony Sherwin, RN

Insignia
- Squadron Badge Description: Barry wavy of ten white and blue, a sun in splendor gold charged with an eagle's head affronty proper (1956)
- Identification Markings: letter/number combinations (Seamew/Swordfish); N7A+ (Swordfish); N6A+ (Avenger); N4A+ and N6A+ (Barracuda); 300-311 (Barracuda); 400-410 (Sea Prince/Anson); 236-239 (Firefly); 394-399 (Avenger); 401-403 (Gannet); 657-661 (Gannet from January 1956)
- Fin Shore Codes: JR (Barracuda); GN (Sea Prince/Anson); CU (Firefly, Avenger & Gannet)

744 Naval Air Squadron (744 NAS), also referred to as 744 Squadron, is a Fleet Air Arm (FAA) naval air squadron of the United Kingdom’s Royal Navy (RN). From September 2024 the squadron became the Joint Uncrewed Air System Test and Evaluation Squadron (JUAS TES), becoming the Ministry of Defence’s lead unit for the test and evaluation of unmanned aircraft system (UAS), based at MOD Boscombe Down. The squadron’s UAS work includes the evaluation of systems such as Stalker, Peregrine and Autonomous Collaborative Platforms, together with associated payloads, weapons, networks and mission systems.

Originally formed in 1943, the squadron has been re-formed several times for different training, anti-submarine warfare and test and evaluation roles. Its successive incarnations included Merchant Aircraft Carrier (MAC ship) and anti-submarine training during the Second World War, anti-submarine trials and development in the 1950s, and, following its re-formation at Boscombe Down in 2018, the testing and evaluation of aircraft, weapons, sensors and mission systems.

Re-formed at RNAS Maydown in 1944, 744 Squadron trained aircrew for Merchant Aircraft Carrier operations before developing a wider anti-submarine training role at RNAS Eglinton. It subsequently formed part of the Joint Anti-Submarine School (JASS), providing the Royal Navy’s air element for combined anti-submarine training, before being renumbered 815 Naval Air Squadron in 1947.

The squadron was re-formed at RNAS Eglinton in 1951 as an anti-submarine trials and development unit. During this period it conducted trials of anti-submarine equipment and tactics, including airborne search and detection systems, and operated Westland Dragonfly helicopters in a search and rescue role from 1952 to 1954. It was disbanded in 1956.

After more than six decades, 744 Squadron was re-formed at MOD Boscombe Down in November 2018 as the Mission Systems and Armament Test and Evaluation Squadron, bringing together personnel from the Royal Navy, British Army and Royal Air Force to test and evaluate aircraft, weapons, sensors and mission systems. Its early work included the introduction of the Crowsnest airborne surveillance and control system (ASACS) for the Merlin HM2 and the evaluation and integration of weapons and other systems across several aircraft types.

== History ==
=== Air Gunner Training Squadron (1943–1944) ===
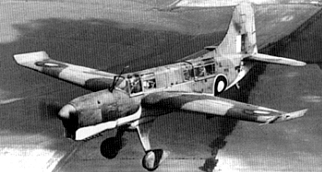
Curtiss Seamew Mk.I, s/n 'FN475' of the Royal Navy Fleet Air Arm

The squadron formed at RNAS Lee-on-Solent (HMS Daedalus), situated near Lee-on-the-Solent in Hampshire, on 10 February 1943. However, as part of the British Commonwealth Air Training Plan, the squadron moved to RN Air Section Yarmouth, located in Yarmouth County, Nova Scotia, Canada, almost straight away. It was equipped with Curtiss SO3C Seamew aircraft. Fifteen months later, in June 1944, the squadron was re-designated as 754 Naval Air Squadron due to the formation of another 744 Naval Air Squadron.

=== Merchant Aircraft Carrier and Anti-Submarine training (1944–1947) ===
The squadron re-formed at RNAS Maydown, County Londonderry, on 6 March 1944 as a Merchant Aircraft Carrier (MAC-ship) training unit, equipped with Fairey Swordfish torpedo bomber aircraft and providing trained crews for 836 Naval Air Squadron.

A detachment at RNAS Machrihanish, Argyll and Bute, provided live armament and anti-submarine warfare training, while the squadron also conducted deck-landing training aboard escort carriers in the Firth of Clyde. including providing Anti-submarine warfare (ASW) training.

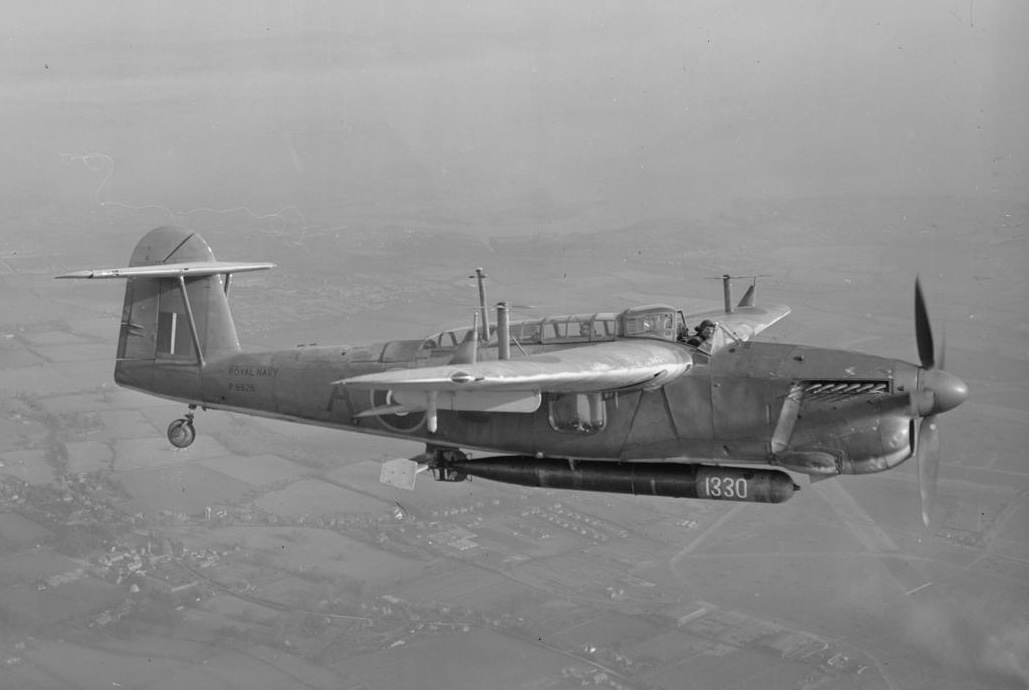
Fairey Barracuda; an example of the type used by 744 Squadron

744 Naval Air Squadron swapped its Fairey Swordfish for Fairey Barracuda torpedo and dive bomber aircraft and then briefly, Fairey Firefly aircraft. The squadron moved to RNAS Eglinton (HMS Gannet), located 1.3 miles (2.1 km) northeast of Eglinton, County Londonderry, Northern Ireland, in October 1945 where it became fully engaged in anti-submarine warfare training. Avro Anson multirole training aircraft were introduced from August 1946 for the squadron’s anti-submarine training duties.

From November 1946, 719 Naval Air Squadron operated as an anti-submarine training squadron, bringing together and training aircrew before passing them to 744 Naval Air Squadron for more advanced training.

An anti-submarine tactics school had been established at the Londonderry Naval Airbase during the latter stages of the Second World War, and this was subsequently developed into the Joint Anti-Submarine School (JASS). JASS was officially opened on 30 January 1947 and was jointly commanded by Royal Navy and Royal Air Force personnel. Its role was to train the crews of ships and aircraft in the broader aspects of anti-submarine warfare, with emphasis on the development and application of combined tactics.

744 Naval Air Squadron provided the Royal Navy’s air element of JASS, operating Fairey Barracuda aircraft from RNAS Eglinton.

On 1 December 1947 the squadron was renumbered as 815 Naval Air Squadron.

=== Anti-Submarine Trials and Development Unit (1951–1956) ===
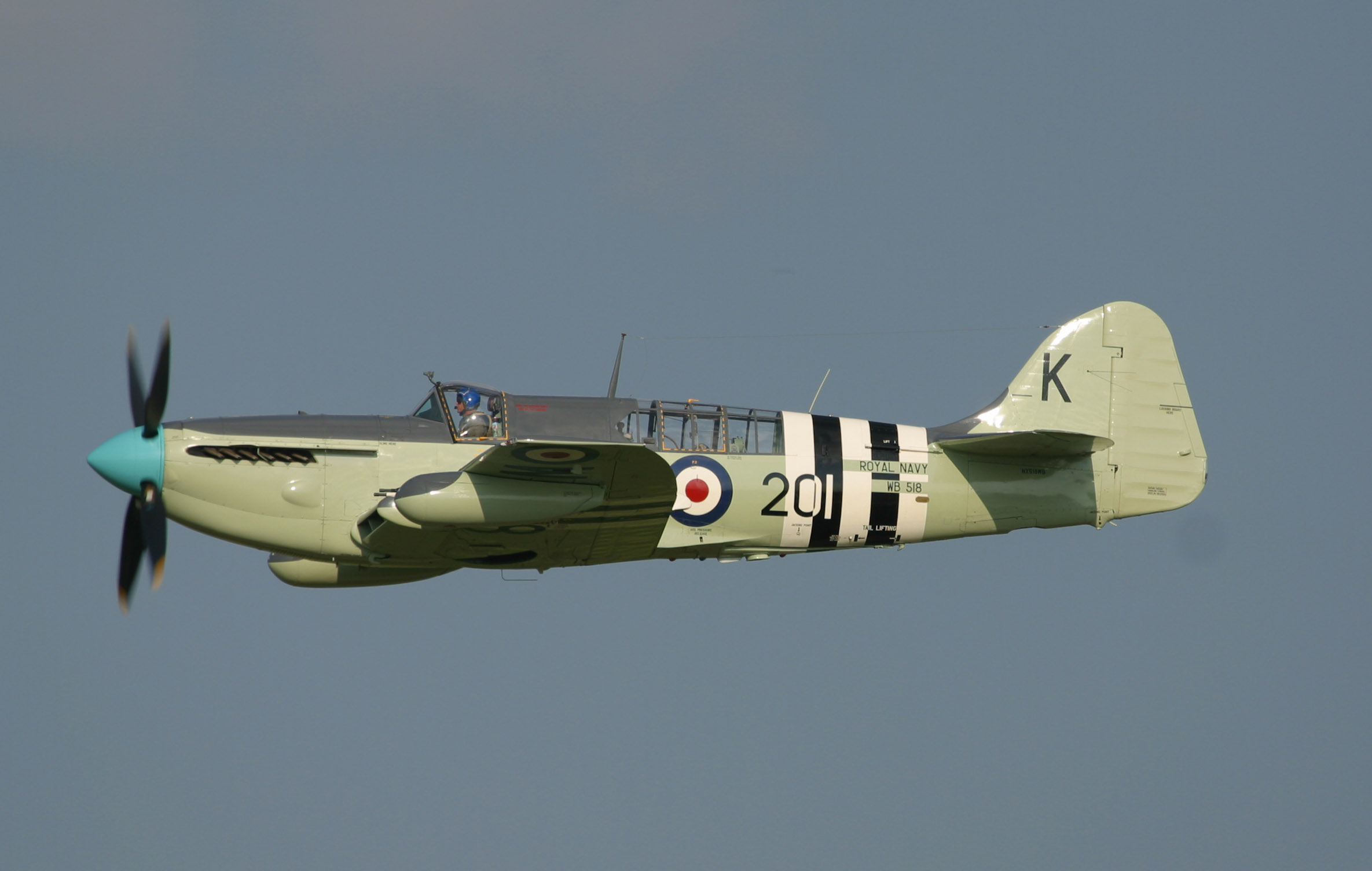
Fairey Firefly AS.Mk 6; an example of the type used by 744 Squadron

744 Naval Air Squadron reformed on 20 July 1951 when X Flight of 737 Naval Air Squadron was redesignated as a Trials and Development Squadron within the Naval Air Anti-Submarine School at RNAS Eglinton. The squadron was equipped with Fairey Firefly and Fairey Barracuda anti-submarine warfare aircraft and Avro Anson multirole training aircraft and was tasked with trials and development work in anti-submarine warfare.

Its early work included trials of search receivers intended to detect radar emissions from submarines. A Fairey Barracuda was modified as a trials aircraft for this work under the name ‘‘Investigation Pointer’’. The squadron also participated in trials associated with Orange Harvest, an electronic support measures system designed to detect radar emissions which was subsequently fitted to Avro Shackleton maritime patrol aircraft.

Two Fairey Firefly aircraft were fitted with a homing device for locating sonobuoys without relying on smoke markers. Following initial trials at Farnborough, the aircraft deployed to RNAS Hal Far in Malta from 3 October to 22 November 1951 for further trials involving submarines and surface ships.

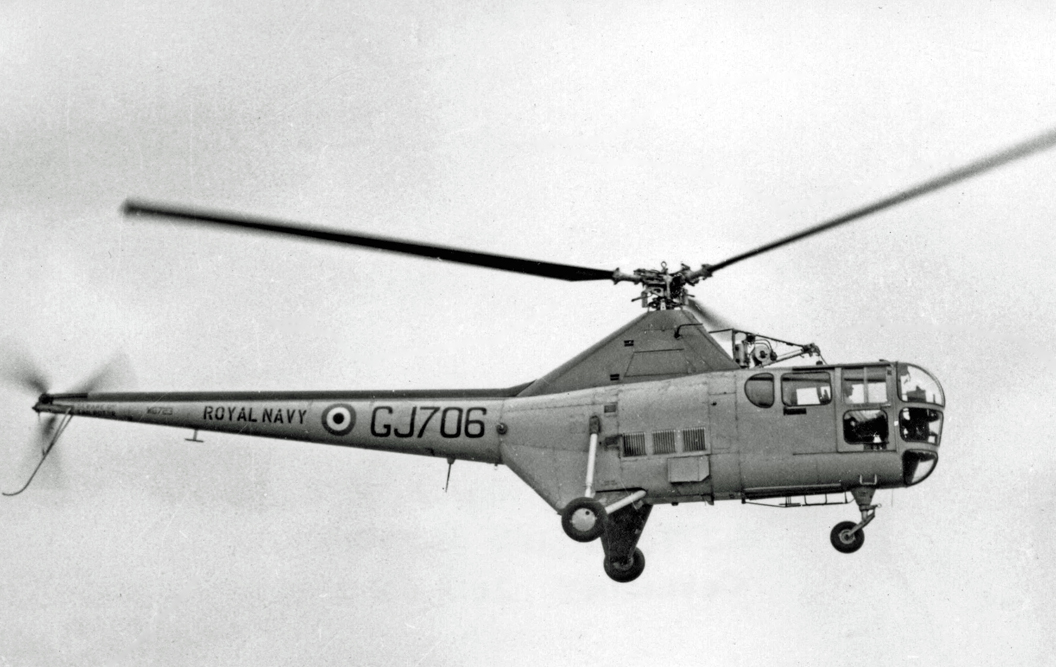
Westland Dragonfly HR.3; an example of the type used for SAR by 744 Squadron

From December 1952 the squadron also undertook search and rescue duties using Dragonfly HR.3 air-sea search and rescue helicopters. By 1953 it was also operating as the station flight at RNAS Eglinton.

The first phase of the squadron’s existence ended on 1 March 1954, when it disbanded at Eglinton. It was reformed the same day at RNAS Culdrose as the Naval Air-Sea Warfare Development Unit, working in conjunction with the Royal Air Force’s Air-Sea Warfare Development Unit at RAF St Mawgan. The squadron moved to St Mawgan on 23 October 1954.

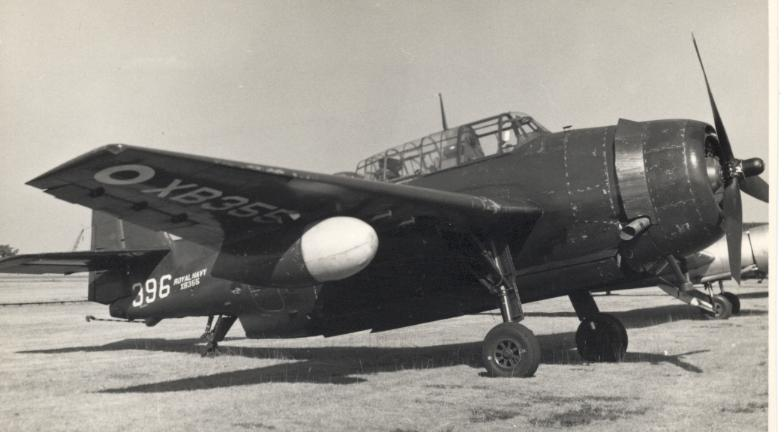
Grumman Avenger AS.5, 'XB355' of 744 Squadron

Initially equipped with Fairey Firefly AS.6s, the squadron conducted a series of trials at St Mawgan, including projects identified by the codenames ‘‘Talbe’’, ‘‘Homer’’ and ‘‘Random’’. Fairey Gannet AS.1s were added from May 1955, followed two months later by Grumman Avenger AS.5s, while the Fairey Fireflies were subsequently withdrawn.

An X Flight was formed on 11 June 1955 to evaluate radar-jamming techniques. In October 1955 the squadron was restyled as the Naval Anti-Submarine Development Squadron. The X Flight subsequently became the basis of 745 Naval Air Squadron, which was formed at RNAS Eglinton on 23 April 1956 as a radar-jamming trials unit and used modified Grumman Avenger AS.5s to evaluate Orange Harvest equipment.

744 Naval Air Squadron disbanded at RAF St Mawgan on 31 October 1956.

=== Mission Systems and Armament Test and Evaluation Sqn (2018–2024) ===
In late 2018, the Mission Systems and Armament Test and Evaluation Squadron (MS & Arm TES) was re-commissioned as 744 Naval Air Squadron at MOD Boscombe Down, Wiltshire. The squadron was established as a tri-service test and evaluation unit, drawing aircrew and aviation engineers from the Royal Navy, British Army and Royal Air Force. Its role was to bring together operational and technical expertise to test and evaluate aircraft, weapons, sensors and upgrades for frontline service.

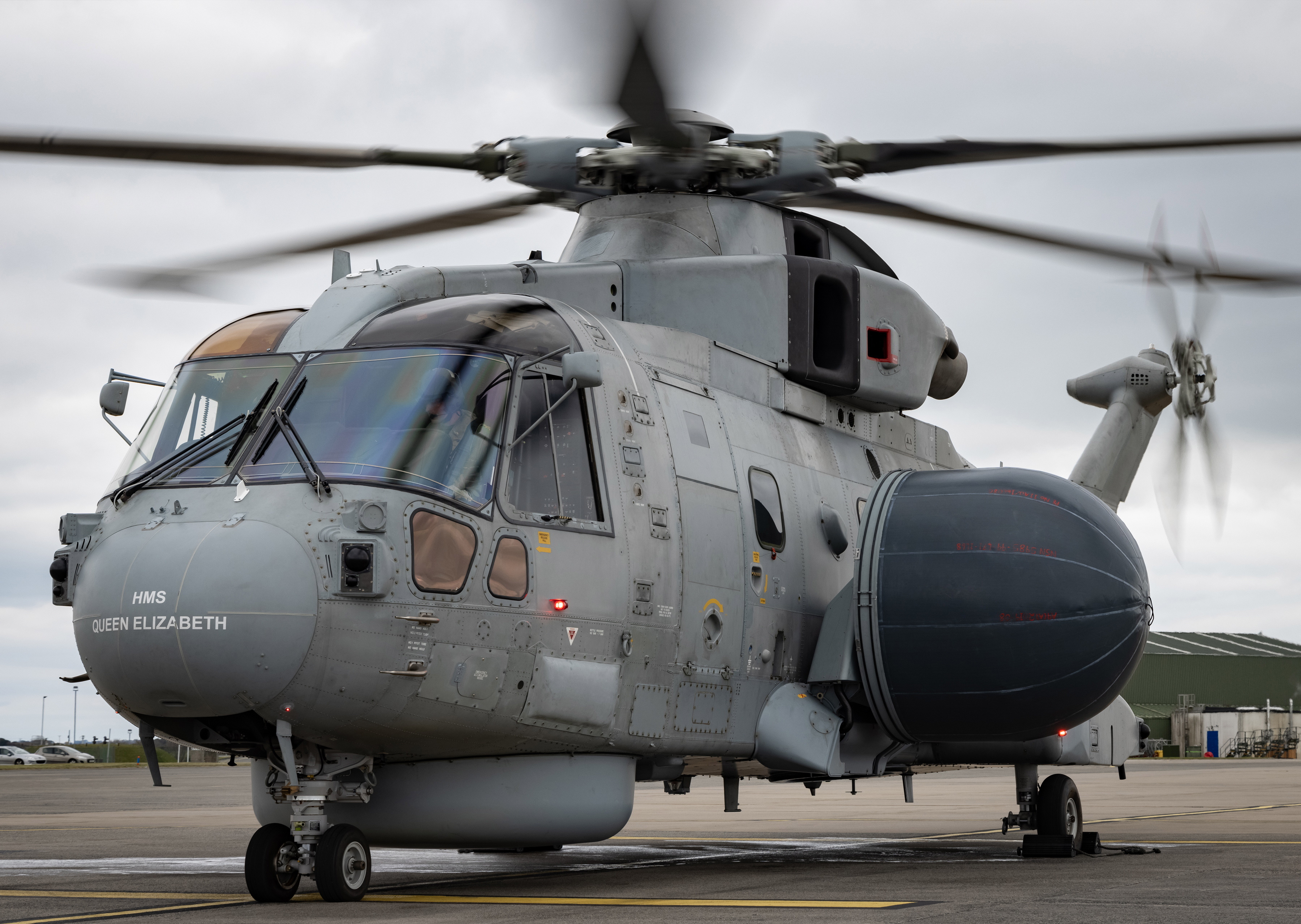
Merlin HM2 anti-submarine warfare fitted with Crowsnest ASACS

One of the squadron’s principal early responsibilities was supporting the introduction of the Crowsnest airborne surveillance and control system (ASACS) for the Merlin HM2 anti-submarine helicopters. It was also tasked with supporting the introduction of the RAF’s upgraded Chinook HC5 and HC6 transport helicopters. The squadron operated within the wider Air Test and Evaluation Centre (ATEC) and maintained a close relationship with the Rotary Wing Test and Evaluation Squadron (RWTES) at Boscombe Down. In ATEC activities supporting the United Kingdom Carrier Strike Group 21 deployment, 744 Squadron provided trials officers who worked alongside QinetiQ specialist engineers and RWTES test pilots to gather evidence for aircraft and weapon-system clearances.

The squadron’s work included the Future Anti-Surface Guided Weapon (FASGW) programme for the Wildcat HMA2 utility, search and rescue (SAR) and anti-surface warfare (ASuW) helicopter. The programme incorporated the Martlet lightweight missile, together with modifications to the aircraft’s weapons carriage, sensors and associated systems. ATEC used trials officers from 744 Squadron as part of its multidisciplinary test teams supporting the development and clearance of the capability.

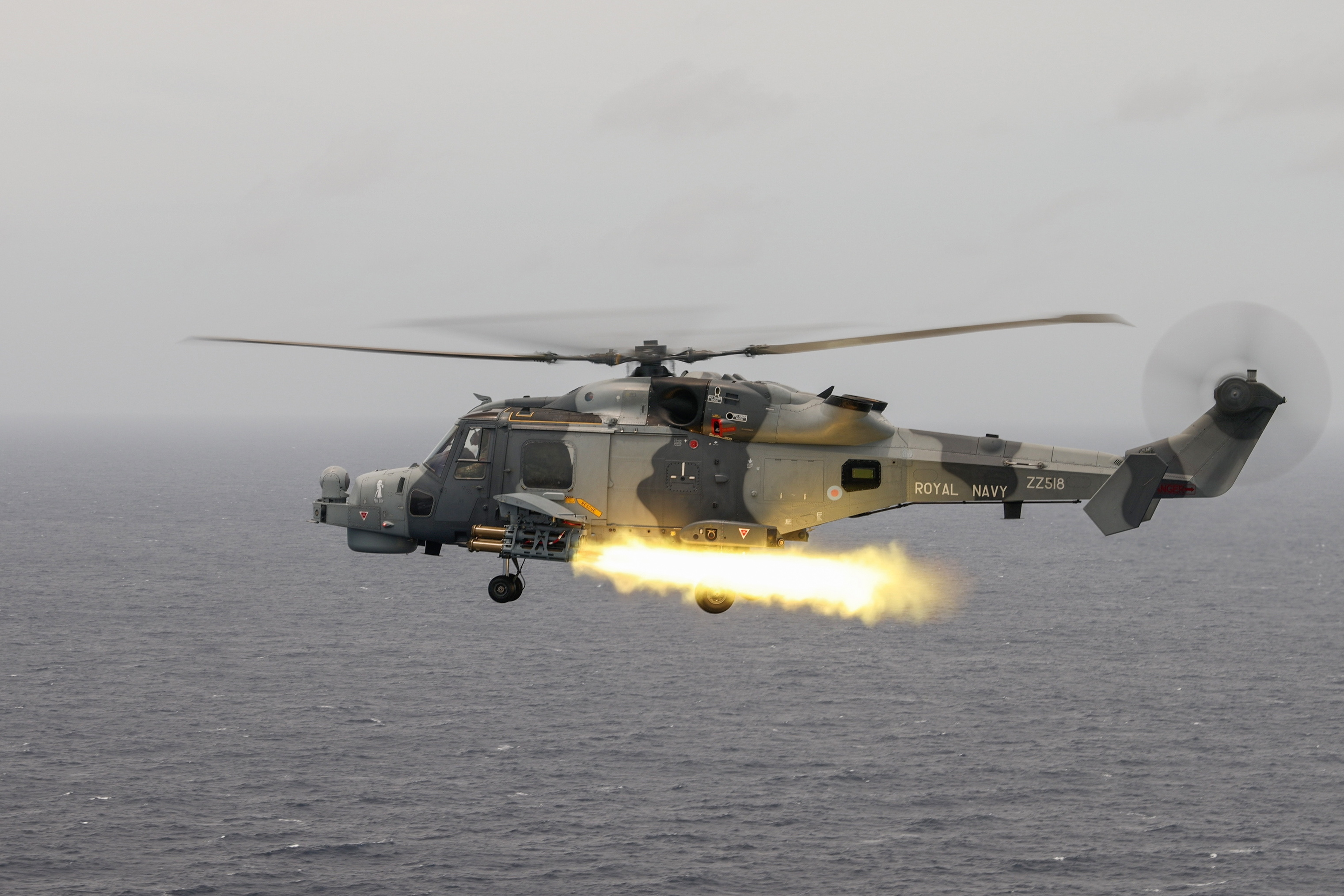
Wildcat HMA2 firing a Martlet lightweight missile

In 2023, 744 Squadron supported further live trials of the Martlet missile from the Wildcat HMA2 helicopter. The trials, conducted with 825 Naval Air Squadron and other Defence and industry organisations, examined the missile’s effectiveness against moving surface targets and airborne threats. The activity culminated in the first successful air-to-air firing of a Martlet from a UK helicopter against a Banshee unmanned aerial target.

During the same period, 744 Squadron continued to provide specialist aerosystems expertise to the wider test-and-evaluation community at Boscombe Down. A 2023 account of RWTES described 744 Squadron as a trials-dedicated unit under the Air and Space Warfare Centre, with suitably trained aerosystems specialists from the squadron supporting rotary-wing test and evaluation activities.

In October 2024, personnel from 744 Squadron participated in the first guided firing of the Sea Venom anti-ship missile from a Wildcat HMA2 helicopter at the MOD Aberporth range in Wales. Lieutenant Commander Robin Kenchington of 744 Squadron described the firing as a full end-to-end demonstration of the missile system. The trial marked a major milestone in the integration of Sea Venom missile with the Wildcat HMA2 helicopter.

By 2024, the squadron’s remit had expanded into uncrewed aerial systems. A UAS Test and Evaluation Flight formed part of 744 Squadron and conducted initial flight trials of the Stalker VXE30 under Project TIQUILA, providing evidence for capability acceptance. This emerging UAS role preceded the squadron’s subsequent transformation to the Joint Uncrewed Air System Test and Evaluation Squadron.

=== Joint Uncrewed Air System Test and Evaluation Squadron (2024–present) ===
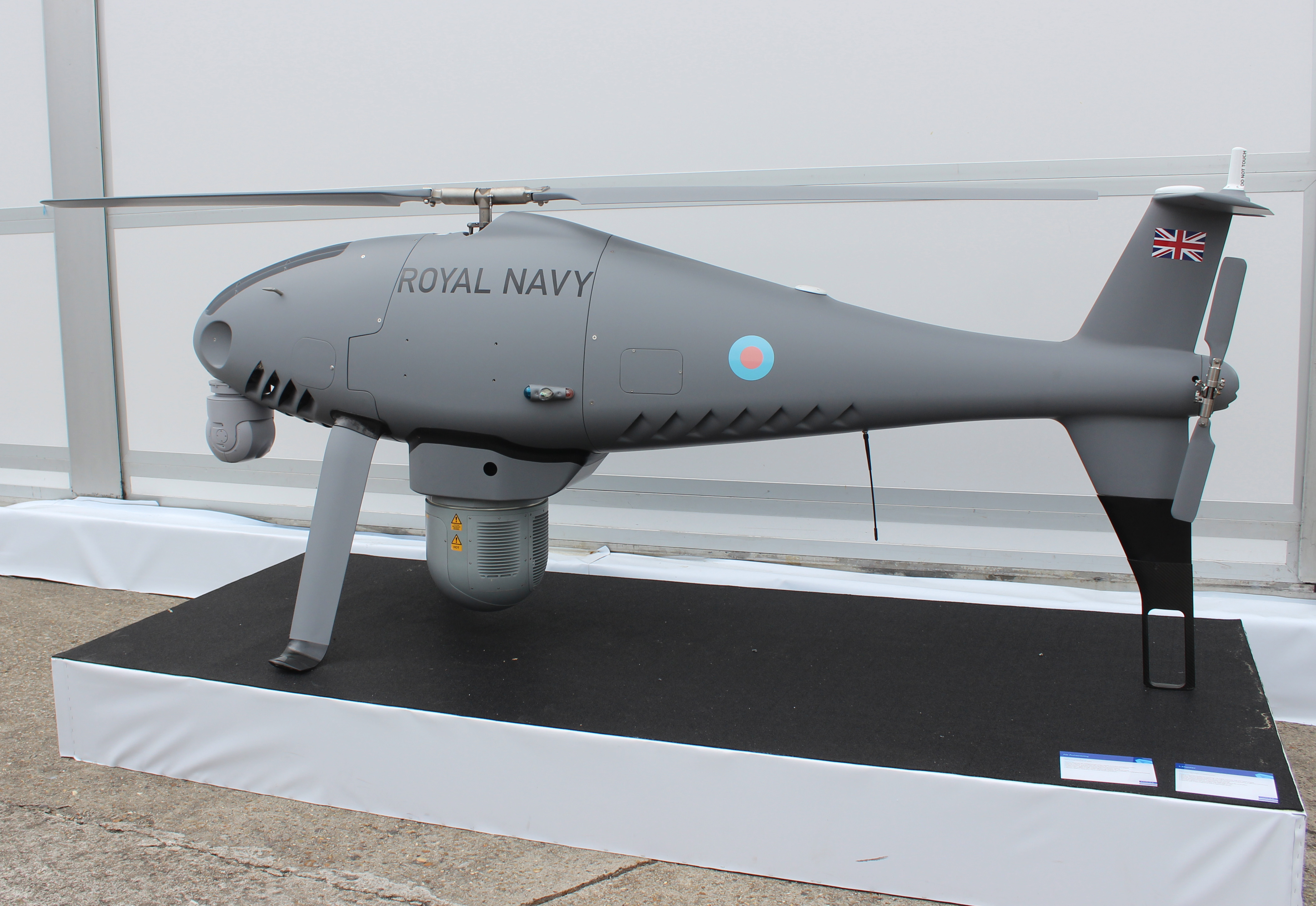
Peregrine UAV

In 2024, 744 Naval Air Squadron transitioned to the Joint Uncrewed Air System Test and Evaluation Squadron (JUAS TES), becoming the Ministry of Defence's lead organisation for the test and evaluation of uncrewed air systems (UAS). The squadron's responsibilities include assessing platform performance and integrating payloads, weapons and advanced networks. It remains part of the Air and Space Warfare Centre and draws aircrew and engineers from the Royal Navy, British Army and Royal Air Force. Its stated areas of UAS activity include the Stalker, Peregrine and Autonomous Collaborative Platform programmes.

The change also represented a transfer of the Ministry of Defence’s UAS test-and-evaluation role from No. 216 Squadron RAF, which had originally been established for swarming drone trials. In October 2024, the Ministry of Defence stated that drone testing and evaluation would henceforth be conducted by 744 NAS as JUAS TES, while 216 Squadron was intended to become the operational delivery squadron for an Autonomous Collaborative Platform capability.

In a large change, the Parliamentary Under-Secretary of State for the Armed Forces, Luke Pollard, answered a written parliamentary question stating that 216 Squadron will transition from its current role as the swarming drone trials unit

"to become the operational delivery squadron for an Autonomous Collaborative Platforms (ACP) capability in 2025."

The role of the drone trials unit will pass to 744 Naval Air Squadron as the Joint Uncrewed Air System Test and Evaluation Squadron.

The squadron subsequently undertook trials involving the integration of uncrewed systems with crewed aircraft. In 2025, 744 Squadron and No. 22 Squadron RAF received the Guild of Air Pilots and Air Navigators’ Eric “Winkle” Brown Memorial Award for trials investigating the launch and control of first-person-view uncrewed aircraft from a Chinook helicopter. The trials examined communications and data-feed ranges, electromagnetic compatibility and safe airborne dispatch, and were intended to provide evidence for crewed–uncrewed teaming concepts.

During 2025, 744 Squadron also became part of the wider Defence uncrewed-air-system test-and-evaluation infrastructure established through QinetiQ’s Droneworks initiative. The framework provides access to UAS testing and specialist assessment for the Air and Space Warfare Centre, the Royal Air Force’s Rapid Capabilities Office, QinetiQ, 744 Squadron and industry. In July 2025, QinetiQ’s Malfy UAS was photographed at MOD Boscombe Down while undergoing testing with its manufacturer and 744 JUAS TES.

The squadron’s Defence-wide role also extended to Army experimentation. In January 2026, the Ministry of Defence stated that the British Army Training Unit Suffield was being used for testing uncrewed systems, with the activity supported by uncrewed-trials expertise from 744 Squadron. In June 2026, 744 Squadron was also named as part of the combined Ministry of Defence team delivering Project Brakestop, a rapid-development programme for low-cost, ground-launched long-range strike systems. The team included personnel from National Armaments, Dstl, the Air and Space Warfare Centre Air Wing, 11 Explosive Ordnance Disposal Regiment and Taskforce Kindred, alongside QinetiQ.

During June 2026, personnel from 744 Squadron took part in a landmark maritime trial in which the Royal Navy launched a Callen‑Lenz Nyan one-way attack drone from the experimental vessel XV Patrick Blackett while underway off the Dorset coast. Working alongside 26th Regiment Royal Artillery and the ship’s company, 744 Squadron supported the setting of autonomous flight profiles, higher‑autonomy navigation tests and counter‑UAS evaluation as part of Project Vantage, the tri‑service effort to develop maritime one‑way effectors. The trial demonstrated that any naval vessel with adequate deck space can employ such expendable systems and provided early data on launch behaviour in ship motion, contributing to wider experimentation following the Ministry of Defence’s 2026 contract for operational and training drones.

The squadron’s transformation into JUAS TES has therefore expanded its longstanding test-and-evaluation function into a Defence-wide role covering uncrewed aircraft, crewed–uncrewed integration, weapon integration and emerging autonomous systems. In 2026, Commander Tony Sherwin, commanding officer of 744 Squadron, participated in a Royal Aeronautical Society Defence Summit session on uncrewed aircraft and their role in achieving strategic advantage, reflecting the squadron’s continuing involvement in the development and assessment of emerging uncrewed capabilities.

== Aircraft flown ==
Throughout its history, 744 Naval Air Squadron has operated a variety of fixed-wing and rotary-wing aircraft in training, anti-submarine warfare, search-and-rescue and development roles. Aircraft operated by the squadron included:

- Curtiss Seamew I observation floatplane (March - December 1943)
- Fairey Swordfish II torpedo bomber ( March 1943 - May 1944, March 1944 - April 1945)
- Fairey Swordfish I torpedo bomber (March 1944 - April 1945)
- Stinson Reliant I liaison and training aircraft (July 1944 - August 1945)
- Grumman Avenger Mk.II torpedo bomber (October 1944 - September 1945)
- Fairey Barracuda Mk II torpedo and dive bomber (November 1944 - August 1945)
- Fairey Swordfish III torpedo bomber (February - May 1945)
- Fairey Barracuda TR III anti-submarine warfare aircraft (March 1945 - December 1947)
- Fairey Firefly I fighter aircraft (July - September 1945)
- Fairey Barracuda Mk III torpedo and dive bomber (August 1945 - October 1946)
- Supermarine Seafire F Mk.III fighter aircraft (May 1946)
- Avro Anson Mk I multirole training aircraft (August 1946 - December 1947, July 1951 - November 1953)
- Airspeed Oxford training aircraft (September 1947)
- Supermarine Sea Otter ASR II amphibious air-sea rescue aircraft (July 1951 - January 1952)
- Fairey Barracuda TR 3 anti-submarine warfare aircraft (July 1951 - July 1953)
- de Havilland Dominie short-haul airliner (July 1951 - September 1953)
- Fairey Firefly AS.Mk 6 anti-submarine warfare aircraft (July 1951 - March 1954, March 1954 - November 1955)
- Percival Sea Prince T1 transport aircraft (August 1952 - February 1954, March 1954 - March 1955)
- Fairey Firefly T.Mk 1 training aircraft (August 1952 - February 1954)
- Westland Dragonfly HR.3 air-sea search and rescue helicopter (December 1952 - February 1954)
- Fairey Firefly T.Mk 2 training aircraft (October 1953 - February 1954)
- Fairey Gannet AS.1 anti-submarine warfare aircraft (May 1955 - October 1956)
- Grumman Avenger AS5 anti-submarine warfare aircraft (July 1955 - February 1956)
- Hawker Sea Fury FB.11 fighter bomber (May - October 1956)

=== Aircraft involved in trials and evaluation ===
Following its re-formation in 2018, 744 Naval Air Squadron's role changed from operating a conventional squadron fleet to the test and evaluation of aircraft, sensors, weapons and other systems. The distinction is therefore made between aircraft flown by the squadron and aircraft used as test or integration platforms.

The squadron was initially responsible for supporting the introduction of the Merlin HM2 anti-submarine warfare helicopter equipped with the Crowsnest Airborne Surveillance and Control system (ASACS), as well as supporting the introduction of upgraded Chinook HC5 and HC6 transport helicopters operated by the Royal Air Force.

The squadron subsequently supported testing and integration programmes involving aircraft including the Wildcat HMA2, Wildcat AH1, Merlin HC4/4A and other front-line platforms. These activities included the integration and evaluation of the Martlet and Sea Venom missiles and other aircraft systems.

In its present role, the squadron also supports test and evaluation programmes involving platforms such as the Typhoon, Apache, Wildcat, Merlin and Puma. These activities include weapons integration, platform upgrades, sensors, avionics and other systems.

=== Uncrewed air systems ===
Since becoming the Joint Uncrewed Air System Test and Evaluation Squadron (JUAS TES) in 2024, 744 Naval Air Squadron has had a principal role in the Ministry of Defence's testing and evaluation of uncrewed air systems. Its stated areas of focus include Stalker and Peregrine uncrewed air systems and Autonomous Collaborative Platforms, alongside the testing and evaluation of existing systems and their integration with other military capabilities.

In 2026, personnel from 744 Naval Air Squadron participated with the Army and the trials ship XV Patrick Blackett in trials of the Callen-Lenz Nyan one-way effector, including a successful launch of the system from the ship while underway.

== Naval air stations and other airbases ==
744 Naval Air Squadron previously operated from a number of naval air stations of the Royal Navy, a number of Royal Navy aircraft carrier and an airbase overseas and is currently based at QinetiQ's military aircraft testing facility, MOD Boscombe Down:

1943 - 1944

- Royal Naval Air Station Lee-on-Solent (HMS Daedalus), Hampshire, (10 February 1943 - 1 March 1943)
- RN Air Section Yarmouth, Nova Scotia, (1 March 1943 - 1 June 1944)
- became 754 Naval Air Squadron

1944 - 1947

- Royal Naval Air Station Maydown (HMS Shrike), County Londonderry, (6 March 1944 - 29 September 1945)
  - Royal Naval Air Station Machrihanish (HMS Landrail), Argyll and Bute, (Detachment 6 March 1944 - 29 September 1945)
- Royal Naval Air Station Eglinton (HMS Gannet), County Londonderry, (29 September 1945 - 1 December 1947)
  - Royal Air Force Ballykelly, County Londonderry, (Detachment six aircraft 27 November 1945 - 1 May 1946)
  - Royal Naval Air Station Maydown (HMS Shrike), County Londonderry, (Detachment 1 May 1946 - 27 January 1947)
  - HMS Theseus, Colossus-class aircraft carrier, (Detachment 7 - 17 November 1946)
- became 815 Naval Air Squadron (1 December 1947)

1951 - 1954

- Royal Naval Air Station Eglinton (HMS Gannet), County Londonderry, (20 July 1951 - 1 March 1954)
  - Royal Naval Air Station Hal Far (HMS Falcon), Malta, (Detachment two aircraft 3 October - 22 November 1951)
- disbanded - (1 March 1954)

1954 - 1956

- Royal Naval Air Station Culdrose (HMS Seahawk), Cornwall, (1 March 1954 - 22 October 1954)
- Royal Air Force Station St Mawgan, Cornwall, (22 October 1954 - 31 October 1956)
- disbanded - (31 October 1956)

2018 - present

- MOD Boscombe Down, Wiltshire, (14 November 2018 - present)

== Commanding officers ==
List of commanding officers of 744 Naval Air Squadron with date of appointment:

1943 - 1944

- Lieutenant(A) E.J. Trerise, RN, from 1 March 1943
- became 754 Naval Air Squadron 1 June 1944

1944 - 1947

- Lieutenant Commander(A) C.M.T. Hallewell, RN, from 6 March 1944
- Lieutenant Commander(A) D.W. Phillips DSC, RN, from 27 February 1945
- Lieutenant Commander(A) O.W. Tattersall, DSC, RN, from 18 September 1945
- Lieutenant(A) J.H.B. Bedells, RN, from 27 February 1946
- Lieutenant(A) R.H.W. Blake, RN, from 20 May 1946
- disbanded - 1 December 1947

1951 - 1954

- Lieutenant Commander F.E. Cowtan, RN, from 20 July 1951
- disbanded - 1 March 1954

1954 - 1956

- Lieutenant Commander F.G.J. Arnold, RN, from 1 March 1954
- Lieutenant Commander R. Fulton, RN, from 4 January 1956
- disbanded - 31 October 1956

2017 - present

- Commander J. Bird, RN, from June 2017
- [Not yet established], from November 2019
- Commander T. Sherwin, RN, from March 2023

Note: Abbreviation (A) signifies Air Branch of the RN or RNVR.
