= MOD Boscombe Down =

Military airfield in Wiltshire, England

- Amesbury, Wiltshire in England
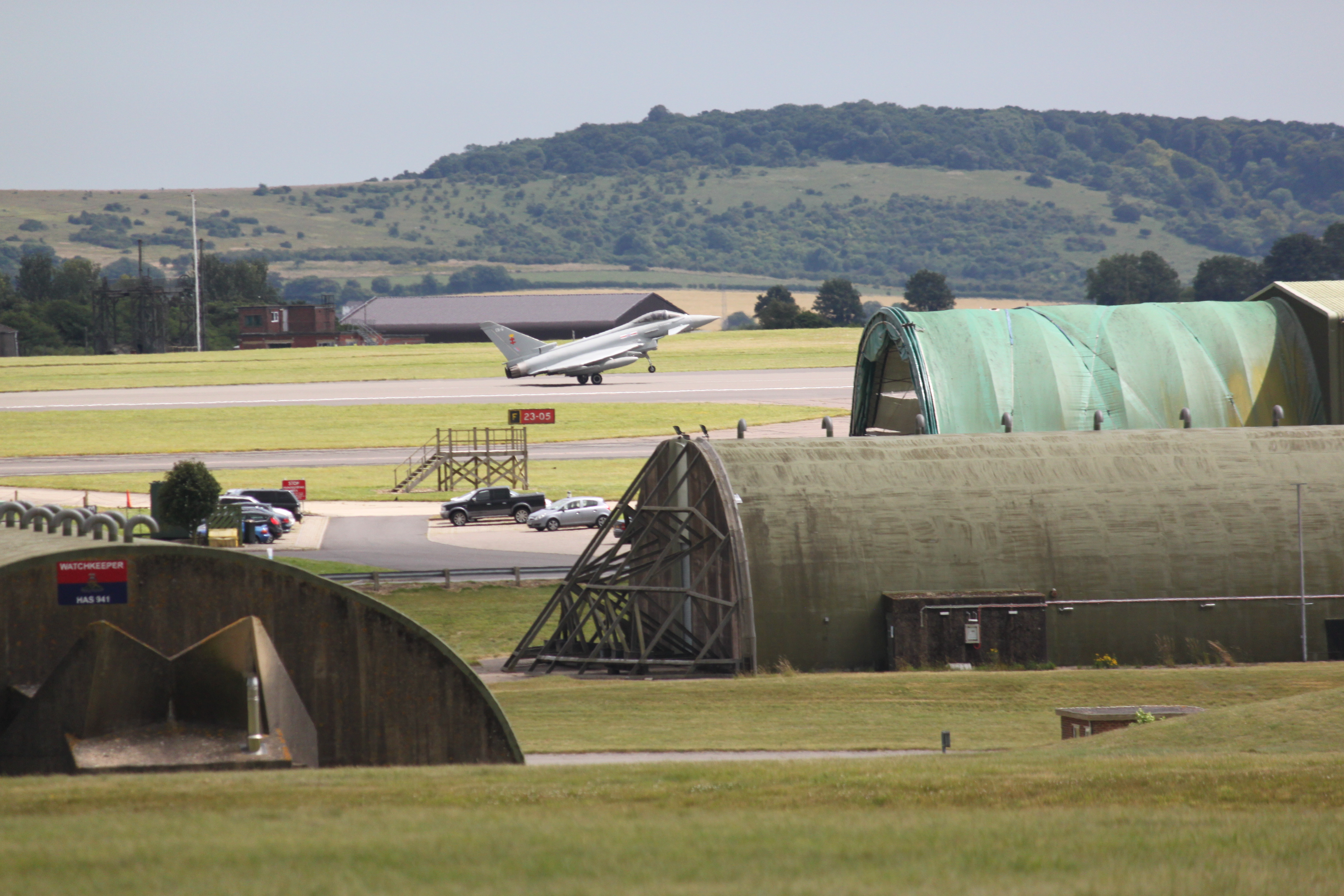
- A Eurofighter Typhoon at MOD Boscombe Down

Site information
- Type: Military test and evaluation airfield
- Owner: Ministry of Defence
- Operator: QinetiQ and Royal Air Force
- Condition: Operational
- Website: www.raf.mod.uk/our-organisation/stations/mod-boscombe-down/

Location
- Shown within Wiltshire
- Coordinates: 51°09′27″N 01°44′49″W
- Area: 572 hectares (1,410 acres)

Site history
- Built: 1917
- In use: 1917–present

Garrison information
- Occupants: Aircraft Test and Evaluation Centre; Empire Test Pilots' School; Rotary Wing Test and Evaluation Squadron; 744 Naval Air Squadron; Bristol University Air Squadron; Southampton University Air Squadron; No. 2 Air Experience Flight RAF; 621 Aerospace Ground School; Joint Aircraft Recovery and Transportation Squadron

Airfield information
- Identifiers: ICAO: EGDM, WMO: 03746
- Elevation: 123.7 metres (406 ft) AMSL
Runways
Direction	Length and surface
05/23	3,205 metres (10,515 ft) Asphalt/Concrete
05S/23S	564 metres (1,850 ft) Grass
- Source: UK MIL AIP Barkston Heath

MOD Boscombe Down (ICAO: EGDM) is the home of a military aircraft testing site, on the south-eastern outskirts of the town of Amesbury, Wiltshire, England.

The airfield was built in 1930 as Royal Air Force Boscombe Down, and since 1939, has evaluated aircraft for use by the British Armed Forces. Today, the site has a main runway 3,212 metres (10,538 ft) in length, greater than many other UK airfields and useful for aspects of test flying. It is managed by QinetiQ, the private defence company created as part of the change from the Defence Evaluation and Research Agency in 2001 by the UK Ministry of Defence.

The airfield's evaluation centre is currently home to the Fast Jet Test Squadron, Heavy Aircraft Test Squadron, Rotary Wing Test and Evaluation Squadron, Handling Squadron (which drafts Pilot and other manuals for UK aircraft types), and the Empire Test Pilots' School which was created in 1943 to train squadron pilots in test-related flying. In 2026 it also became home to an anti-jamming test facility. The Royal International Air Tattoo is relocating to MOD Boscombe Down in 2027.

== History ==
=== First World War ===
An aerodrome opened at the Boscombe Down site in October 1917 and operated as a Royal Flying Corps Training Depot Station. Known as Royal Flying Corps Station Red House Farm, it trained aircrews for operational roles in France during the First World War. Between opening and early 1919 the station accommodated No. 6 Training Depot, No. 11 Training Depot and No. 14 Training Depot. When the United States entered the war in April 1917, the Royal Flying Corps began training groundcrew and aircrew of Aviation Section of the US Army at the airfield. During 1918 the 166th Aero Squadron and 188th Aero Squadron were present. At the end of the war in November 1918, the airfield became an aircraft storage unit until 1920 when it closed and the site returned to agricultural use.

=== Inter-war period ===
In 1930 the site reopened as Royal Air Force Boscombe Down, a bomber station in the Air Defence of Great Britain command, the fore-runner of RAF Fighter Command. The first unit to operate from the new airfield was No. 9 Squadron which started operating the Vickers Virginia heavy bomber on 26 February 1930. A second Virginia unit, No. 10 Squadron, arrived on 1 April 1931 and also operated the Handley Page Heyford.

The following RAF squadrons were based at Boscombe Down between 1930 and 1939:

- No. 9 Squadron RAF; between 1930 and 1935, with the Vickers Virginia;
- No. 10 Squadron RAF; between 1931 and 1937, with the Virginia
- No. 51 Squadron RAF; between 1937 and 1938, with the Virginia, Avro Anson, and the Armstrong Whitworth Whitley;
- No. 58 Squadron RAF; between 1937 and 1938, with the Anson, and the Whitley;
- No. 78 Squadron RAF; between 1936 and 1937, with the Heyford;
- No. 88 Squadron RAF; between 1937 and 1939, with the Hawker Hind, and the Fairey Battle;
- No. 97 Squadron RAF; between 1935 and 1937, with the Heyford;
- No. 150 Squadron RAF; between 1938 and 1939, with the Battle;
- No. 166 Squadron RAF; between 1936 and 1937, with the Heyford;
- No. 214 Squadron RAF; between 1935 and 1935, with the Virginia;
- No. 217 Squadron RAF; between 1937 and 1937, with the Anson;
- No. 218 Squadron RAF; between 1938 and 1939, with the Battle;
- No. 224 Squadron RAF; between 1937 and 1937, with the Anson.

=== Second World War ===
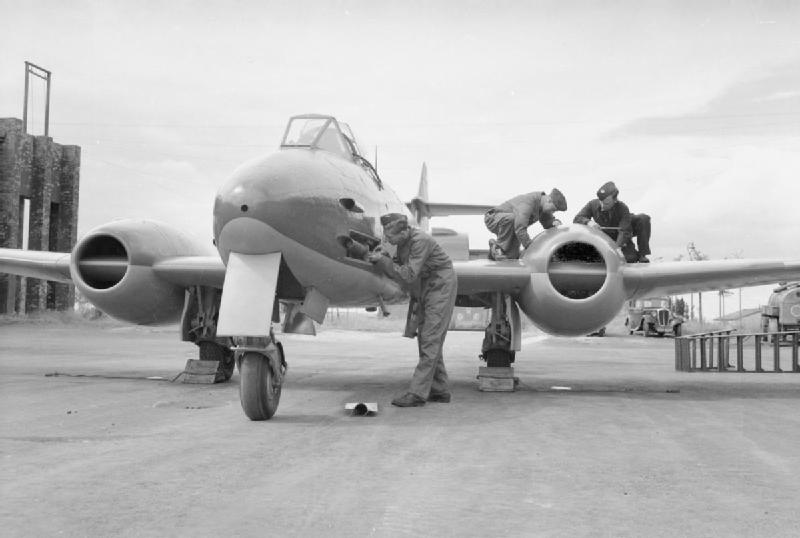
Personnel work on a Gloster Meteor F.3 at Boscombe Down during the Second World War

The Aeroplane and Armament Experimental Establishment (A&AEE) arrived from RAF Martlesham Heath, Suffolk, on 9 September 1939, shortly after the outbreak of the Second World War. The move marked the beginning of A&AEE Boscombe Down and aircraft research and testing at the station, a role which it has retained into the 21st century. About fifty aircraft and military and civilian personnel had arrived by mid-September 1939. The necessary facilities required for the specialist work carried out by the A&AEE were lacking at Boscombe Down, and its expansion resulted in many temporary buildings being constructed at the station in an unplanned manner.

- No. 35 Squadron RAF; during 1940, with the Handley Page Halifax I;
- No. 56 Squadron RAF; during 1940, with the Hawker Hurricane I;
- No. 109 Squadron RAF; between 1940 and 1942, with the Whitley, Anson, and Vickers Wellington;
- No. 249 Squadron RAF; during 1940, with the Hurricane.

Throughout the war, the airfield continued to have only grass runways and remained within its pre-war boundaries. The first hard-surface runway opened in October 1945 and was followed by two more runways with parallel taxiways to create the present-day layout. The runways extend into Idmiston and Allington parishes.

=== Cold War ===
Boscombe was used to test and evaluate many aircraft flown by the British Armed Forces during the Cold War. First flights of notable aircraft include the English Electric P 1 (the forerunner of the English Electric Lightning), the Folland Gnat and Midge, Hawker P.1067 (the prototype Hunter), Westland Wyvern, and the BAC TSR.2. Part of the base was also used by the RAF School of Aviation Medicine.

=== Aviation trial and evaluation centre ===
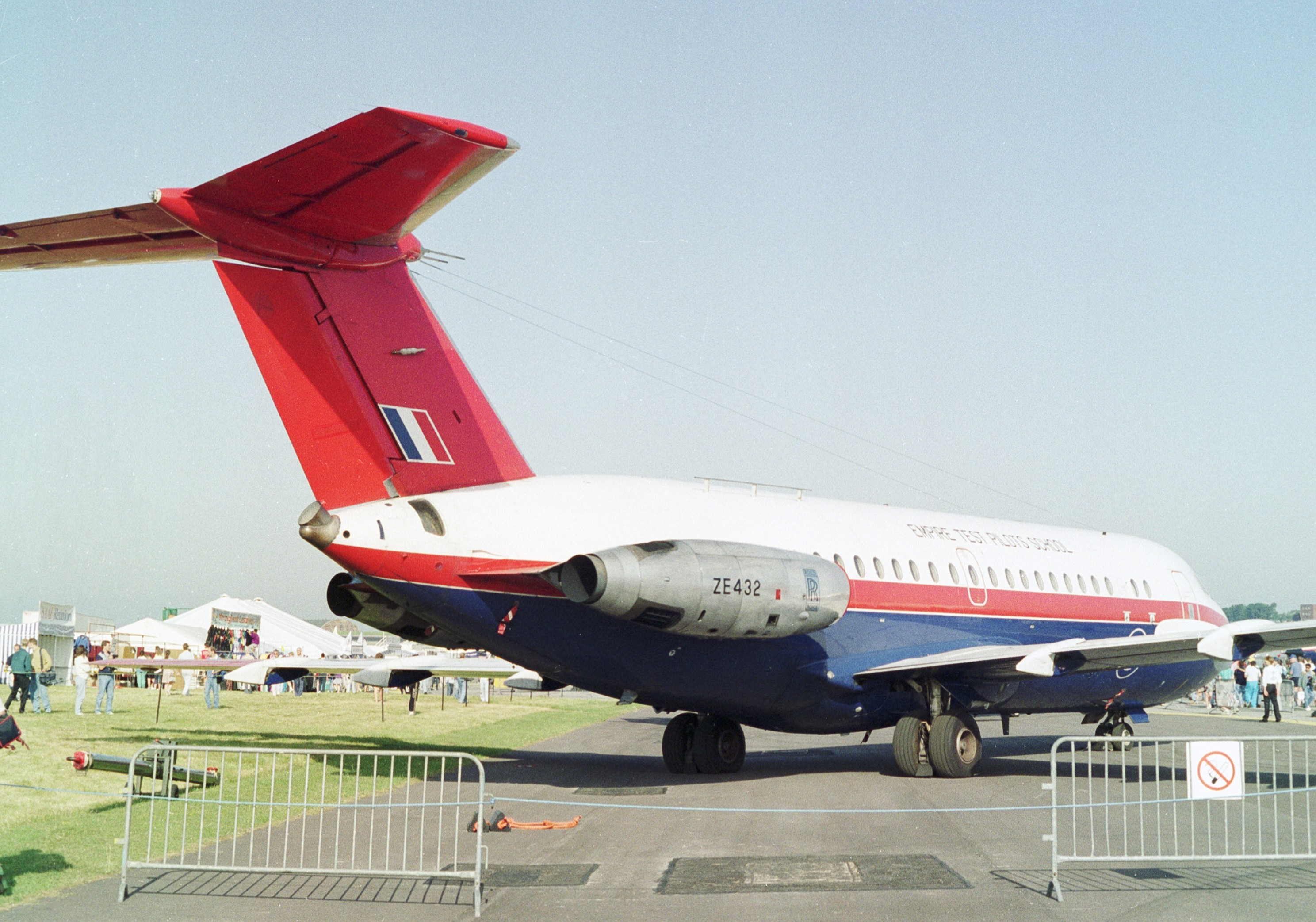
A BAC 1-11 of the Empire Test Pilots' School seen at the International Air Tattoo at Boscombe Down on 13 June 1992

Responsibility for the site passed from the MoD Procurement Executive to the Defence Test and Evaluation Organisation (DTEO) in 1993, which was amalgamated into the Defence Evaluation and Research Agency (DERA) in 1995.

On 15 August 1995 the first Dominie T.2 arrived for trials. On 31 October 1997 the first Panavia Tornado GR.4 arrived for evaluation.

During this period, the station may have been involved in assisting the United States with its black projects. On 26 September 1994, after an aircraft crashed on landing due to a nosewheel collapse, a USAF C5 Galaxy was redirected to the station. It is speculated that the crashed plane was an Aurora, a hypersonic spy plane. Whatever it was, it was disassembled and returned to the US by the C5 Galaxy. Both the British and American Governments have refused to comment on the incident.

=== 21st century ===
Following the creation of QinetiQ in 2001, a 25-year Long Term Partnering Agreement was established with the MoD, covering 16 sites including Boscombe Down. Under the agreement, Boscombe Down remains a government military airfield, but is operated by QinetiQ on behalf of the MoD. The Joint Test and Evaluation Group was established under the control of RAF Air Command, and together with QinetiQ, forms the Air Test and Evaluation Centre.

From 1 May 2007, Boscombe Down became the home of the Joint Aircraft Recovery and Transportation Squadron which was an amalgamation of the two Royal Navy and Royal Air Force elements that were responsible for aircraft moves and post-crash management.

In October 2007, it was announced that MOD Boscombe Down would become a Quick Reaction Alert airfield from early 2008, offering round-the-clock fighter coverage for the South and South West of UK airspace when required.

In April 2022, the RAF Centre of Aviation Medicine retired its two BAE Systems Hawk T.1 which were based at Boscombe Down. The aircraft were used for trials by the centre's Aviation Medicine Flight. The flight moved to RAF Scampton to continue its work using Hawks operated by the Red Arrows.

An anti jamming test facility is to be built at Boscombe Down by 2026. QinetiQ will build one of Europe’s largest anechoic chambers that will be capable of housing large military assets such as Protector drones, Chinook helicopters, and F-35 fighter jets for testing against electronic warfare threats.

In November 2026, it was announced that MOD Boscombe Down would host the Royal International Air Tattoo from 2027.

== Past units ==
The Heavy Aircraft Test Squadron (HATS) at Boscombe Down was responsible for the flight testing of heavy aircraft (multi-engine types). The department subsequently became known as Fixed Wing Test Squadron (FWTS); however, during the late 1980s, the title once more changed to that of the Heavy Aircraft Test Squadron.

The following units were located at the base at some point:

- No. 4 Group Experimental Flight
- No. 6 Training Depot Station
- No. 11 Training Depot Station
- No. 13 Joint Services Trials Unit
- No. 22 Joint Services Trials Unit
- No. 29 Joint Services Trials Unit
- No. 42 Squadron RAF
- No. 75 (Bomber) Wing RAF
- 819 Naval Air Squadron
- 893 Naval Air Squadron
- 899 Naval Air Squadron
- No. 2780 Squadron RAF Regiment
- No. 2786 Squadron RAF Regiment
- Aeroplane and Armament Experimental Establishment
- Aircraft and Armament Evaluation Establishment RAF became Test and Evaluation Centre
- Aircraft Gun Mounting Establishment RAF
- Assessment and Evaluation Centre RAF
- Blind Approach Training and Development Unit RAF became Wireless (Intelligence) Development Unit RAF
- Bomber Development Unit RAF
- Bustard Flying Club
- Handling Flight RAF became Handling Squadron RAF
- High Altitude Flight (A&AEE)
- Intensive Flying Development Flight RAF
- Intensive Flying Development Unit
- Meteorological Research Flight RAF became Meteorological Research Unit RAF
- RAF Centre of Aviation Medicine Flight
- Special Duties Flight RAF
- Strike Attack Operational Evaluation Unit (SAOEU)
- Tornado Operational Evaluation Unit RAF

== Based units ==
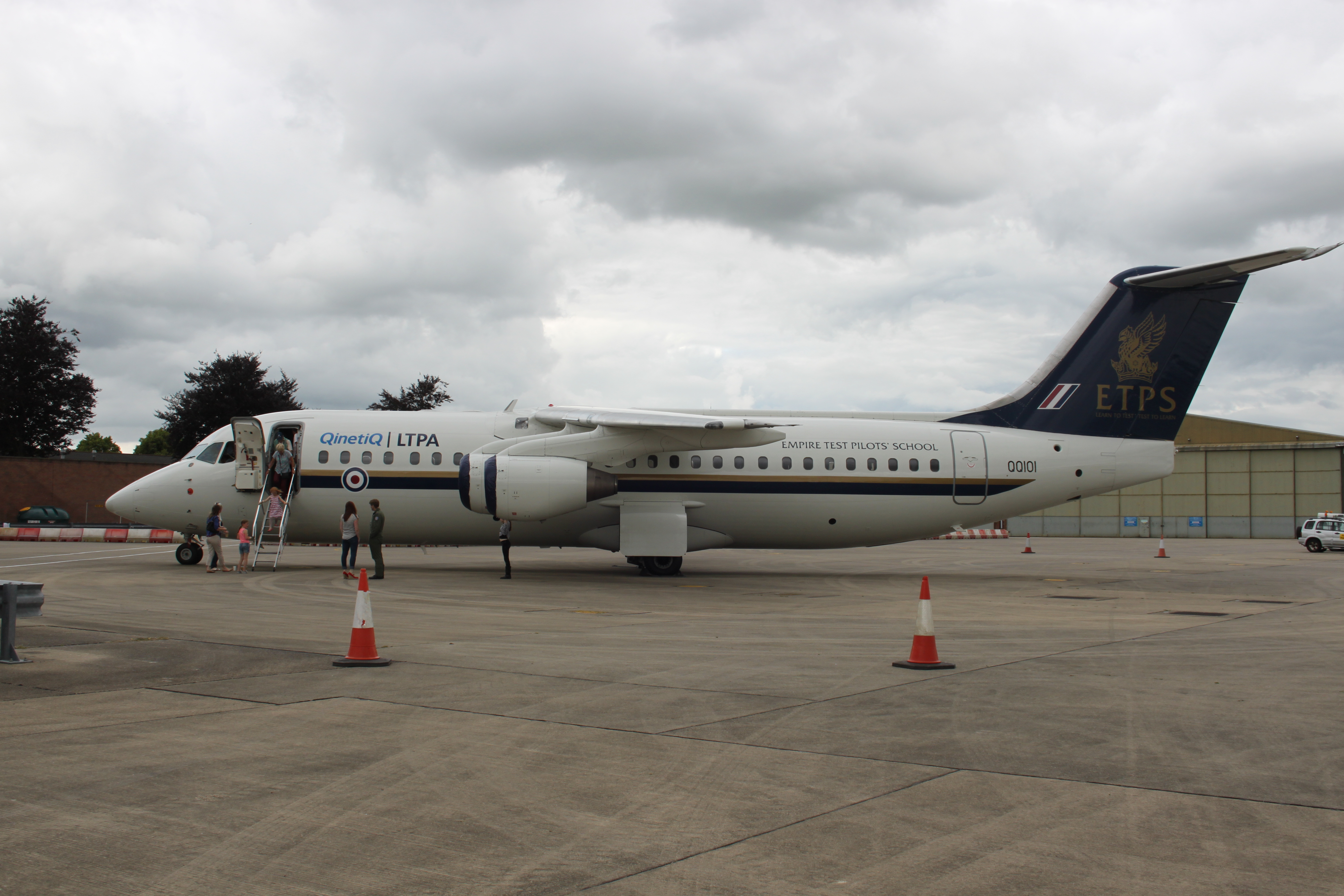
An Avro RJ100 operated by QinetiQ seen at Boscombe Down during 2016

The following flying and non-flying units are based at MOD Boscombe Down.

=== Royal Air Force ===
No. 1 Group (Air Combat) RAF

- Air and Space Warfare Centre
  - Air Test and Evaluation Centre (operated in partnership with QinetiQ)
  - Empire Test Pilots School – Beechcraft King Air 350, Airbus H145, Avro RJ, Agusta A109, Airbus H125, Diamond DA42, Grob G120TP, PC-21, AW139, Eurofighter Typhoon, Calspan Learjet In-Flight Simulator, NH90 (in partnership with Finnish Defence Forces), Airbus A350, GB1 GameBird.
  - Rotary Wing Test and Evaluation Squadron
  - 744 Naval Air Squadron – Merlin HM.2 and Chinook HC.5/6

No. 2 Group (Air Combat Support) RAF

- Support Force
  - No. 42 (Expeditionary Support) Wing
    - Joint Aircraft Recovery and Transportation Squadron

No. 22 Group (Training) RAF

- No. 6 Flying Training School
  - Bristol University Air Squadron – Grob Tutor T1
  - Southampton University Air Squadron – Grob Tutor T1
  - No. 2 Air Experience Flight – Grob Tutor T1
  - 621 Aerospace Ground School – Simulators

== Agencies ==
The Defence Accident Investigation Branch (DAIB), a part of the Defence Safety Authority which investigates accidents and incidents in military transport, has its head office in Building 120 at MOD Boscombe Down.

== See also ==
- List of aerospace flight test centres
- List of Royal Air Force stations
