= Southampton University Air Squadron =

University flying squadron of the Royal Air Force

- SUAS badge
- Founded: 15 February 1941
- Country: United Kingdom
- Branch: Royal Air Force
- Role: Officer Training, Ab Initio Flying Training,
- Part of: No. 6 Flying Training School RAF
- Garrison/HQ: MOD Boscombe Down
- Mottos: Latin: Fortibus Ardua Cedunt "Adversity Yields to the Bold"

Aircraft flown
- Trainer: Grob Tutor T1

Southampton University Air Squadron (SUAS /suˈæs/) is a unit of the Royal Air Force which provides basic flying training, adventurous training and personal development skills to undergraduate students of the University of Southampton, University of Portsmouth, Bournemouth University, Southampton Solent University, University of Chichester and University of Winchester. The aim of all University Air Squadrons is to allow those potential RAF officers to experience service life and to allow them to decide whether they are suited to it. There is no obligation to join up after being a member of a UAS unless an RAF bursary is successfully applied for. SUAS is parented by MoD Boscombe Down where it flies Tutor aircraft.

== Training nights ==
Training nights are held on Tuesday evenings at MoD Boscombe Down and are compulsory for Officer Cadets. Christmas (Freshers' Camp), Easter and Summer Training periods, each between a few days and a week long in duration are held at MoD Boscombe Down to further the development of members through flying, adventurous training, sport and force development.

== Affiliated Units ==
SUAS parents 2 Air Experience Flight with which it shares aircraft to allow local air cadet units the chance to experience powered flying.

== Flying ==
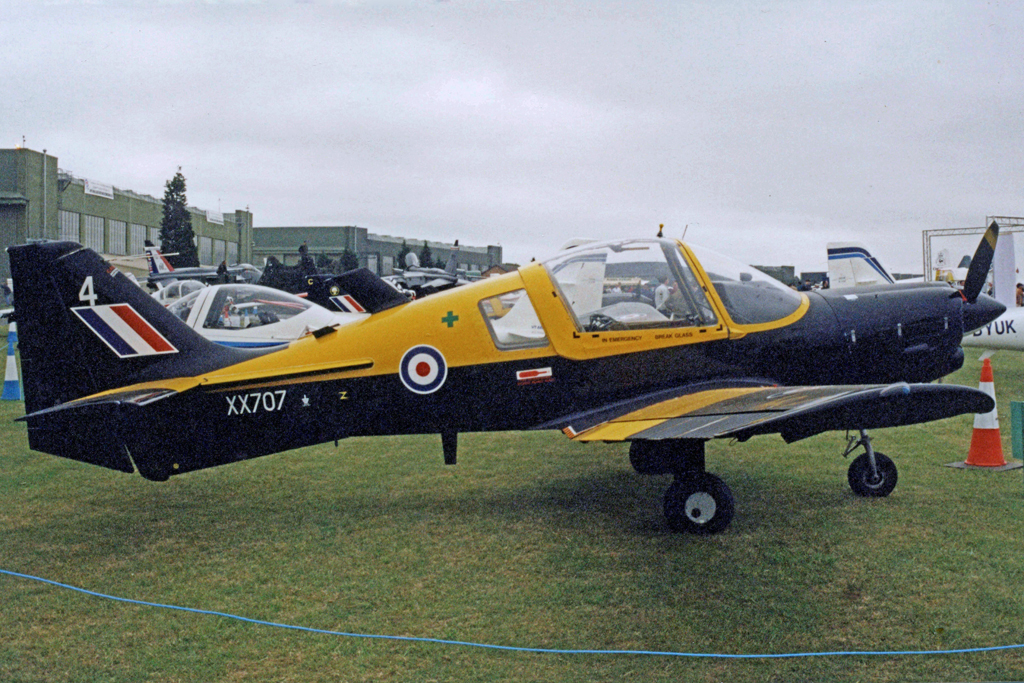
Southampton UAS Scottish Aviation Bulldog at RAF Cottesmore in 2000

Students follow a modified form of the Elementary Flying Syllabus covering the basics of flight up to solo navigation exercises. Students who complete this initial syllabus can then progress to the Advanced Flying Syllabus and learn formation flying, aerobatics, and low level navigation skills. Each student is officially allocated 10 hours of flying training each year, though occasionally some flyers exceed this amount. Some individuals apply for a PPL from their flying experience on the UAS.

In 1956 41 undergraduates from Southampton and Nottingham volunteered to work with the RAF over the summer, with some travelling to Malta.

In 1961 it won the Hack Trophy for the second time in three years, for precision flying.

The flying aspect of the SUAS is overseen by the commanding officer (OC SUAS) and the chief flying instructor (CFI), both of whom are RAF qualified flying instructors (QFI). Additional QFIs are sometimes available.

All flying is based at MoD Boscombe Down where the Grob Tutor is used as the instructional aircraft. Previous types operated were the De Havilland Chipmunk and Scottish Aviation Bulldog.

== Adventurous Training ==
SUAS participates in many forms of adventurous training (AT), including climbing, canoeing, kayaking, mountaineering, sailing, ski touring and mountain biking. The squadron's Ground Training Instructor (GTI) facilitates many of the above activities, but most activities and exercises are organised and led by students.

SUAS relies heavily on student instructors for adventurous training (AT). Qualifications can be gained by attending a Joint Services Adventure Training (JSAT) course, which is usually free. Students attending will be taught the necessary techniques for successful and safe instruction in their chosen discipline, and can then lead others on AT.

=== MEC Cup ===
In 2009, the Southampton Military Education Committee introduced a competition between the four service units based in the city. Organised by the students in the units, Thunderer Squadron (DTUS) contributed a weekend of AT in the Snowdonia National Park. Each unit had the opportunity to enter one or more teams to show off their planning, navigation and expedition skills. In 2009 Thunderer Squadron took first place in this event. In 2010, SUAS's two teams took the first two positions. In 2011 SUAS won for the second consecutive year.

=== Expeditions Abroad ===
In previous years small deployments to Canada, for open canoeing and dog sledding, and skiing in the European Alps have taken place. A week in Germany in the summer of 2010 included rock climbing, mountaineering, mountain biking and paddle sport.

Some students may take the opportunity to travel abroad with regular members of the armed forces. SUAS has been represented in France, Germany, Switzerland and Italy in past years. Student instructors have assisted regular forces to mount expeditions overseas, most recently Rock Climbing high in the Italian Dolomites.

With an enhanced emphasis on expeditions, the RAF no longer supports exclusive downhill skiing and instead focuses on the significantly more arduous ski touring. In January 2011, SUAS and Oxford UAS went on a joint expedition to Sainte Foy for this purpose.

SUAS members had planned several overseas expeditions in 2020 and 2021 such as diving in Malta and kayaking in Canada, however these plans remain on hold due to the COVID-19 pandemic.

=== Mountaineering and Rock Climbing ===
In addition to larger expeditions, weekends in the Snowdonia National Park and Brecons Beacons of Wales to improve climbing and mountaineering skills are a regular occurrence.

=== Yacht Sailing ===
SUAS members have the opportunity to go yacht sailing on a regular basis - students can organise expeditions at any time of the year through the Joint Services Adventurous Sail Training Centre. Student instructors will take personnel sailing and teach them how to crew a 34-foot yacht. In Summer 2010, a two-week expedition led by a student along the south coast of the UK reached and returned from Dartmouth in challenging weather.

== Charity Work ==
SUAS participates in charity work and will democratically choose a charity to focus on as a squadron at the start of each academic year. Past charities SUAS have supported include MindUK and the Movember Foundation. They support the Royal British Legion by selling poppies on their university campus' in uniform every year before Remembrance Day. Other examples of their volunteering and charity work includes marshaling the Oakhaven Half Marathon every year in uniform and participation in plane-pulling contests.

=== Airshows ===
Members of the squadron are able to volunteer at airshows across the country in order to fundraiser for their chosen charity. In August 2018 14 members took part in Bournemouth Airshow raising money for the Jon Egging Trust. Members of SUAS have also represented the squadron at the Royal International Air Tattoo.

=== Jon Egging Trust ===
SUAS has a close relationship with the Jon Egging Trust (JET), a charity set up to commemorate Flight Lieutenant Jon Egging, who died in an accident in 2011 as part of the Red Arrows flying display team after succumbing to g-LOC. Apart from fundraising, members of the squadron also attend JET's Blue Skies Program days in order to assist with their running. Usually members will attend these days in pairs and assist the JET staff in any way they can.

== Sports ==
SUAS has been successfully represented at the RAF and Inter Service Climbing Championships in the guest categories. In 2020 one of their Officer Cadets recorded the 4th quickest time in the RAF for a 5 km run. The time was also the quickest run time in the U23 category for 5 km.

The squadron also competes in inter-UAS competitions and occasionally provide an RAF presence at major sporting fixtures.

== Joining ==
Students can join SUAS in any year at university as long as they have 2 full years remaining of their degree. Members usually stay for two years. Students from the Universities of Southampton, Portsmouth and Bournemouth and other higher education establishments around Southampton may apply to join, but due to time and personnel constraints, SUAS only attends these universities' Fresher's Fairs. After completing the joining process a successful student would be attested and become a member of the Volunteer Reserve.

=== Fitness ===
Once attested, students have to pass a medical and a fitness test. Males should aim for at least a 9.10 on the bleep test, 20 press ups and 35 sit ups.

== Structure ==
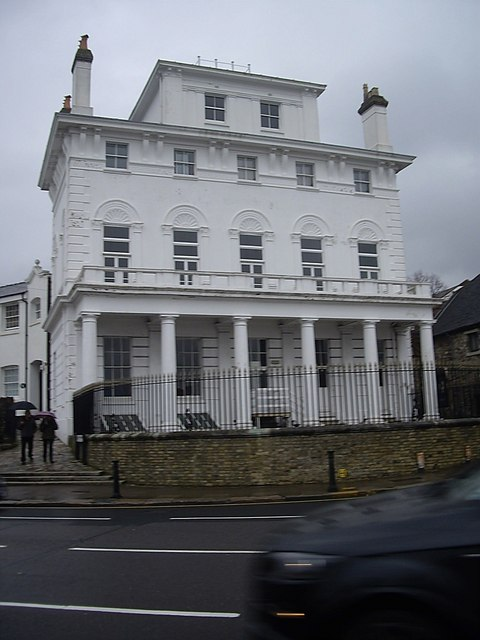
SUAS Ex-Town Headquarters (God rest her soul)

While SUAS is generally operated informally, a command structure does exist. The commanding officer (OC SUAS) has overall responsibility, supported by the adjutant, who oversees administrative tasks and is supported by office staff. The student body has a senior student, usually an acting pilot officer (APO) who essentially heads up the student body, and aside from the extra commitment organising activities, acts as a liaison to the permanent staff. The senior student is supported by a deputy senior student and three flight commanders, again APOs, who oversee the three student flights and participate in the running of the squadron.

They are assisted by an executive committee which is chosen from the student body each year. Positions include Adventurous Training Executive, University Services Units Liaison Executive, Reservist Liaison Executive, MT Executive, Airfield Executive, Sports Executive, Computing and Information Systems Executive, Charity Executive, Engagements and PR (Public Relations) and Force Development Executive. There is a Mess Secretary who records the minutes of Executive Committee meetings and assists the Mess Committee. A Mess Committee is ratified by the student body each year: positions include Entertainments, Bar, Shop and Digital Media.

== Incidents ==
- On Tuesday 7 December 1965 at Ningwood, an aircraft tore through two 11kW overhead power lines. Local power was off for 40 minutes. The aircraft flew from Hamble.
- On Wednesday 7 December 1966 'WZ864' collided with another aircraft 'G-ATEA' near Hamble, at 2,000 ft. 19 year old Nicholas Davis, from Potters Bar, crashed landed into a nearby house. He was taken to Southampton Hospital

== Alumni ==
- Sqn Ldr Adam Collins, Aeronautical Engineering 1996-99, commanding officer of the Red Arrows
- Flt Lt Jon Egging, Environmental Science at Southampton University, and his wife Emma, who studied Archaeology
- Christopher Orlebar, Concorde pilot, Chemistry and PPE

== Staff ==
- Janusz Żurakowski, Battle of Britain Polish fighter pilot

== See also ==
- University Air Squadron units
- University Royal Naval Unit, the Royal Navy equivalent
- Officers Training Corps, the British Army equivalent
- List of Royal Air Force aircraft squadrons
