= 754 Naval Air Squadron =

Inactive flying squadron of the Royal Navy's Fleet Air Arm

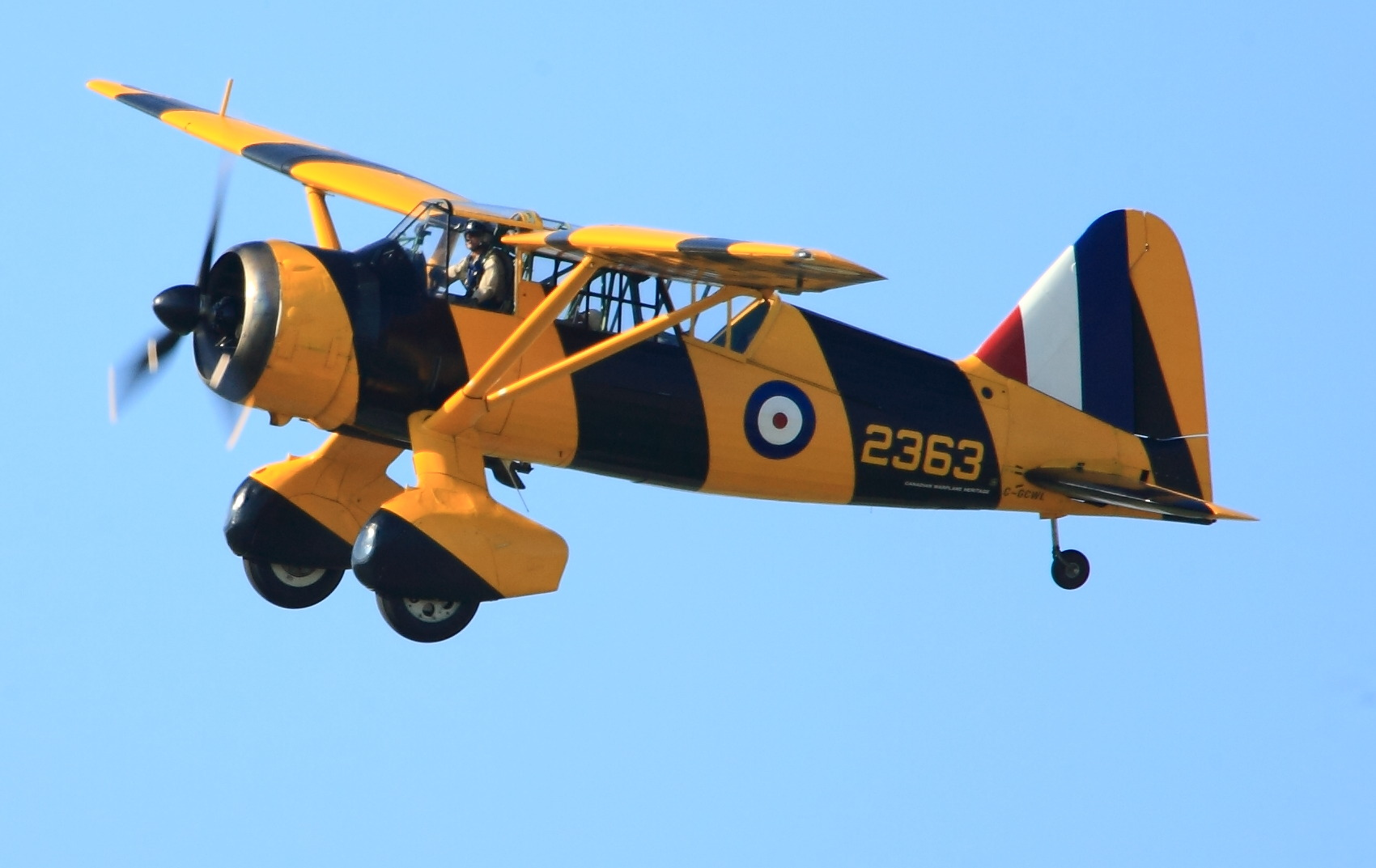
- A Westland Lysander III, similar to the TT type used by 754 NAS
- Active: 1939–1944; 1944–1945
- Disbanded: 12 March 1945
- Country: United Kingdom
- Branch: Royal Navy
- Type: Fleet Air Arm Second Line Squadron
- Role: Observer Training Squadron; Air Gunner Training Squadron
- Size: Squadron
- Part of: Fleet Air Arm
- Home station: See Naval air stations section for full list.
- Aircraft: See Aircraft operated section for full list.

Commanders
- Notable commanders: Lieutenant Commander Eugene Esmonde, VC, DSO

Insignia
- Identification Markings: W5A+ A5A+ (later) single letters (Swordfish)

754 Naval Air Squadron (754 NAS), sometimes referred to as 754 Squadron, is an inactive Fleet Air Arm (FAA) naval air squadron of the United Kingdom’s Royal Navy (RN). The squadron was last active as an Air Gunner Training Squadron, as part of No. 1 Naval Air Gunners School, when 744 Naval Air Squadron was re-designated 754 Naval Air Squadron in June 1944, situated at RN Air Section Yarmouth, Nova Scotia, Canada, until disbanding in March 1945.

It was initially active as an Observer Training Squadron from 1939 to 1944 as part of No. 2 Observer School, forming out of the School of Naval Co-operation RAF, in May 1939. It initially operated out of RNAS Lee-on-Solent, HMS Daedalus, Hampshire, however, after the Naval Air Station was attacked and bombed, it then moved to north to RNAS Arbroath ,HMS Condor, Angus, Scotland, in September 1940. Here, it provided training for Observers and also Air Gunners and where four years later, in March 1944, it disbanded.

== History ==
=== Observer Training Squadron (1939-1944) ===
754 Naval Air Squadron formed out of the School of Naval Cooperation RAF to become part of No. 2 Observers School, at RNAS Lee-on-Solent (HMS Daedalus), in Hampshire, on 24 May 1939. It was initially equipped with Fairey Seafox I, a ship-borne reconnaissance floatplane, Supermarine Walrus I, an amphibious maritime patrol aircraft and Percival Vega Gull, a trainer and communications aircraft. In February 1940, the squadron then acquired a number of variants of Percival Proctor IA, II and IIA, a radio trainer and communications aircraft.

On 16 August 1940 the Luftwaffe attacked the airbase and caused considerable damage. In the air raid a number of people were killed and several buildings severely damaged. 754 Naval Air Squadron then moved to RNAS Arbroath (HMS Condor), located near Arbroath in East Angus, Scotland, on the 7 September 1940, gaining North American Harvard IIb, an advanced trainer and Fairey Swordfish torpedo bomber, but only retaining the Percival Proctor aircraft. From June 1941 the squadron started operating Westland Lysander IIIa, an army cooperation and liaison aircraft, for training duties and by November they were the only aircraft used. In February 1943 the torpedo bomber Fairey Albacore I arrived, however, by December they were gone and the squadron was back to only operating the Westland Lysander aircraft. In January 1944 Stinson Reliant I arrived, however, on the 27 March 1944, 754 Naval Air Squadron disbanded at RNAS Arbroath.

=== Naval Air Gunnery School (1944-1945) ===
It then reformed as a Training Squadron when 744 Naval Air Squadron was re-designated 754 Naval Air Squadron on 1 June 1944 at RN Air Section Yarmouth, located in Yarmouth County, Nova Scotia, Canada, and was part of the British Commonwealth Air Training Plan until disbanding on 12 March 1945, when the Naval Air Gunner School ceased operations.

== Aircraft operated ==
754 Naval Air Squadron has operated a number of different aircraft types, including:

- Fairey Seafox I ship-borne reconnaissance seaplane (May 1939 - September 1940)
- Supermarine Walrus I amphibious maritime patrol aircraft (May 1939 - September 1940)
- Blackburn Roc fighter aircraft (April 1940 - June 1940)
- Percival Vega Gull military trainer and communications aircraft (May 1939 - March 1940)
- Percival Proctor IA deck landing and radio trainer (February 1940 - November 1941)
- Percival Proctor IIA radio trainer aircraft (December 1940 - October 1941)
- Percival Proctor II radio trainer aircraft (May 1941 - November 1941)
- Westland Lysander Mk.IIIA army co-operation and liaison aircraft (Jun 1941 - Mar 1944)
- Fairey Albacore I torpedo bomber (February 1943 - March 1944)
- Fairey Swordfish II torpedo bomber (June 1944 - March 1945)

== Naval air stations ==
754 Naval Air Squadron operated from a number of naval air stations of the Royal Navy, in England, Scotland and overseas in Canada:

1939 - 1944

- Royal Naval Air Station Lee-on-Solent (HMS Daedalus), Hampshire, (24 May 1939 - 7 September 1940)
- Royal Naval Air Station Arbroath (HMS Condor), Angus, (7 September 1940 - 27 March 1944)
- disbanded - (27 March 1944)

1944 - 1945

- RN Air Section Yarmouth, Nova Scotia, (renumbered from 744 Naval Air Squadron 1 June 1944 - 12 March 1945)
- disbanded - (12 March 1945)

== Commanding officers ==
List of commanding officers of 754 Naval Air Squadron with date of appointment:

1939 - 1944

- Lieutenant Commander E. Esmonde, VC, DSO, RN, from 24 May 1939
- Lieutenant Commander E.J.E. Burt, RN, from 31 May 1940
- Lieutenant Commander H.E.S. Pritchett, RNVR, from 10 January 1941
- Lieutenant Commander A.F.E. Payen, RNVR, from 22 April 1942
- Lieutenant Commander D.A. Horton, RNVR, from 2 May 1942
- Lieutenant Commander W.E. Davis, RNVR, from 15 October 1943
- disbanded - 27 March 1944

1944 - 1945

- Lieutenant(A) E.J. Trerise, RNVR, from 1 June 1944 (Lieutenant Commander from 1 Dec 1944)
- disbanded - 12 March 1945

Note: Abbreviation (A) signifies Air Branch of the RN or RNVR.
