= Joint Aircraft Recovery and Transportation Squadron =

UK military joint aircraft recovery unit

- Squadron badge
- Active: 1 May 2007 – present
- Country: United Kingdom
- Branch: Royal Navy; Royal Air Force
- Type: Air Combat Service Support Unit
- Role: Aircraft recovery & transportation; Aircraft Post-Crash Management
- Size: 75 personnel (2020)
- Part of: No. 42 (Expeditionary Support) Wing
- Home station: RAF Wittering
- Motto: Swift to Recover

The Joint Aircraft Recovery and Transportation Squadron (JARTS), informally known as Crash and Smash, is a combined Royal Navy and Royal Air Force squadron that is tasked with the recovery and surface transportation of aircraft under the aegis of the British military framework. The squadron operates worldwide, and recovering aircraft from post-crash incidents is a large part of their work. Whilst they are a component of the British military, they may be asked to attend and recover aircraft from non-military incidents (such as the 2015 Shoreham Airshow crash) as they have a Memorandum of Understanding with the UK's Air Accidents Investigation Branch (AAIB).

== History ==
=== Background ===
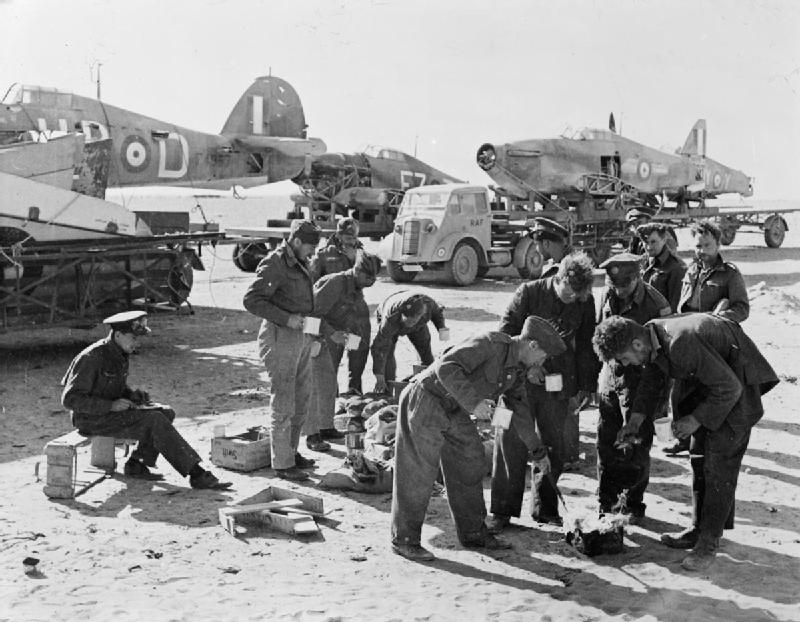
Personnel of No. 53 Repair and Salvage Unit in the Western Desert while transporting salvaged Hawker Hurricane fuselages to Helwan, Egypt during the Second World War.

Assessing, salvaging, repairing and transporting crashed aircraft was the responsibility of No.'s 49, 58, 60 & 71 Maintenance Units during the Second World War. Gradually, 71 MU took over all responsibility for this task worldwide as well as carrying out routine aircraft transportation. This was strengthened as the other MU's were disbanded. 71 MU was formed in July 1940 at Slough with elements taken from 49 MU at RAF Faygate. The unit was moved to RAF Bicester in 1953. In 1976 the unit merged with 60 MU to form the Repair and Salvage Squadron (RSS) at RAF Abingdon. The RSS was moved to RAF St Athan in 1992 where it stayed for 15 years.

=== Establishment ===
The Joint Aircraft Recovery and Transportation Squadron (JARTS) was established on 1 May 2007. It was formed from the RAF's Forward Support Integrated Project Team and the Aircraft Recovery & Transportation Flight (ARTF) based at MOD St Athan, which dealt with fixed wing aircraft post-crash management (ACPM) and the Royal Navy's Mobile Aircraft Support Unit (Transport & Salvage) at DARA Fleetlands in Gosport, which carried out similar activities for rotary wing aircraft.

The two elements operated from their respective home stations until the Autumn of 2010 when they were combined at MOD Boscombe Down in Wiltshire. Boscombe Down's location near RAF Benson and RAF Odiham, AAC Middle Wallop and RNAS Yeovilton was seen as convenient for the frequent tasks involving helicopters that JARTS undertakes. Initially subordinate to No. 85 (Expeditionary Logistics) Wing, at some point JARTS moved under the command of No. 42 (Expeditionary Support) Wing.

Between its inception in 2007 and October 2010, JARTS was responsible for the routine movement of 600 aircraft worldwide.

== Role ==
The Joint Aircraft Recovery and Transportation Squadron is the only unit within the British Armed Forces which carries out aircraft recovery and transportation. JARTS is based at MOD Boscombe Down in Wiltshire. It is part of the RAF A4 Force, the RAF's deployable engineering and logistics capability.

The squadron is primarily staffed by Royal Air Force service personnel and the Royal Navy make up the rest (about 20%).

Aircraft recovered by JARTS may have crashed or more typically suffered a hard landing. The squadron provides aircraft post-crash management (ACPM), specialist handling capabilities and onward transportation to the aircraft's home station or other location for repair or scrap. The unit also regularly transports retired military aircraft which are destined to become gate guardians or museum exhibits, which although a secondary to the main task of post-crash management, fulfils the bulk of JARTS's work.

JARTS also have a remit to assist the AAIB when requested to do so by the AAIB. Some of the most notable instances of this have been Pan Am Flight 103 (the Lockerbie Disaster), the 2008 Boeing 777 crash at Heathrow and the 2015 Shoreham Airshow crash, when a former RAF Hawker Hunter crashed onto the A27 road in East Sussex. The aircraft was in private hands, but because of the knowledge and experience held by JARTS of moving old aircraft that are used as gate guardians, the AAIB requested their help.

Moving gate guardians is also within the remit of JARTS. This can involve simply swapping aircraft over, such as at RAF Leeming when a Gloster Javelin was swapped for a Tornado F3 which was repositioned at the front gate; or when a base closes such as at RAF Brampton when its F4 Phantom was moved back to Wattisham Airfield in Suffolk, from where it used to fly.

Aircraft moves are also undertaken to enable training to be accomplished on them at various sites.
