= Project Brakestop =

UK long-range missile

Project Brakestop is an initiative of the United Kingdom Ministry of Defence (MoD) initiative to develop low-cost, long-range, ground-launched strike missiles for Ukraine, intended to be a cheaper complement to existing cruise missiles such as the Storm Shadow.

== History ==
The programme was launched in November 2024 by Taskforce Kindred to deliver new capabilities within months. A competition was set to build suitable weapons to hit targets beyond 500 kilometres (310 mi), carry a 225-kilogram (496 lb) warhead, travel faster than 600 kilometres per hour (370 mph), and cost around £400,000 per unit, excluding the warhead. Twenty-seven bids were received, and six firms received initial contracts of about £5,000,000 each to build prototypes within seven months.

By December 2025, three suppliers progressed to flight testing at MOD Hebrides: MBDA UK, MGI Engineering, and Rotron Aerospace. Each received follow-on contracts of around £15,000,000 to refine designs and produce 15 improved effectors with launchers and support vehicles. A key requirement was that the systems contain no US components, avoiding International Traffic in Arms Regulations and enabling sovereign UK control over export and use. Officials stated that one or more of the missiles were expected to be delivered to Ukraine by the end of 2026.
