= Rotary Wing Test and Evaluation Squadron =

- Active: 1950 – present
- Country: United Kingdom
- Branch: Ministry of Defence (operated by QinetiQ)
- Type: Flying squadron
- Role: Helicopter test and evaluation
- Part of: Air and Space Warfare Centre
- Home station: MOD Boscombe Down

Aircraft flown
- Multirole helicopter: Airbus H125; AgustaWestland A109E Power; Bell 412 HAR2

The Rotary Wing Test and Evaluation Squadron (RWTES) is a tri-service UK military organisation based at MOD Boscombe Down, Wiltshire. Primarily, the squadron is responsible for test and evaluation of rotary wing aircraft and equipment, or their associated modifications.

== Squadron Role ==
To test and evaluate rotary wing aircraft and their associated equipment and weapon systems to generate evidence to support recommendations for Military Aircraft Release / Release To Service or advice for Service Deviation and assist in MoD R&D programmes.

== History ==
RWTES (formerly D Sqn) was formed in September 1950 at Boscombe Down as part of the Aeroplane and Armament Experimental Establishment (A&AEE). The squadron came into existence as helicopters became ever more prevalent in the UK Armed Forces and consolidated test and evaluation was required. Over the years, the parent organisation has changed: A&AEE became part of the Defence Test and Evaluation Organisation, absorbing the work of RAE Bedford and RAE Farnborough; then part of the Defence Evaluation and Research Agency (DERA); and on 2 July 2001 a part of RAF Strike Command (now Air Command) working in a public-private partnering arrangement with QinetiQ.

== Personnel ==
RWTES is a military tri-service squadron commanded, over alternative tours, by a Royal Navy Commander and Army Lieutenant Colonel/Colonel. There are 14 other test pilots from the Royal Navy, Army Air Corps and Royal Air Force plus 3 highly experienced aircrewman. These military (or ex-military) personnel provide recent operational role experience and ensure all testing is related to current or future military operations. As well as being very experienced and above-average pilots, all test pilots are graduates of the Empire Test Pilots' School (ETPS) also located at MOD Boscombe Down, or one of the other three internationally recognised military test pilot training academies in the USA or France.

== Typical work ==
Any new aircraft, new equipment or modification for use in British military aircraft needs to be safe to be flown in the intended role and effective at prosecuting that role. RWTES personnel are responsible for planning, executing and reporting flight test trials for the Royal Navy, British Army and Royal Air Force. Typical trials include assessment of performance, flying qualities, airworthiness, systems and safety modifications. Recent examples are:

- Bringing new aircraft into service;
- Mid-life upgrades to in-service aircraft;
- Improved night vision devices;
- Improvements to aircraft performance;
- Updated Defensive Aids Suites;
- New radios and other communication devices.

Trials involving new aircraft major modifications to in-service aircraft are conducted in Combined Test Teams with representatives from the manufacturer (e.g. AgustaWestland), RWTES, QinetiQ, and the Operational Evaluation Unit (OEU) of the Arm or Service (e.g. the Royal Navy's Lynx OEU).

== Aircraft ==
RWTES have use of a number of aircraft, permanently based at Boscombe Down, including 2 Sea King, and 4 Gazelles. The longest serving of which is Gazelle HT3 XZ936, commissioned in May 1978 and living its entire life at Boscombe Down. Two of the Gazelles are painted in the classic A&AEE colours of red, white and blue; they are used for continuation training and trials work as well for instruction use by ETPS. One Sea King is an "instrumented" HC4 Junglie and the other is an uninstrumented HU5. Flight test instrumentation (FTI) is fitted to some aircraft to accurately measure parameters including performance, sideslip, 'G' and control activity.

Additional military aircraft are allotted to Boscombe Down for specific trials; including the AH-64 Apache, Chinook, Merlin, Puma, plus any other in-service military helicopter.

== Training ==
In 1914 the Experimental Flight was established at Upavon to assess the new aeroplanes and their equipment for this revolutionary new means of warfare. The Experimental Flight expanded in the inter-war years and in 1943 a dedicated school was set up by Air Marshal Sir Ralph Sorley, the controller of Research and Development, as he was concerned by the rising number of fatalities in test flying and a lack of standardisation of flying techniques. The Test Pilots' Training Flight at Boscombe Down was formed, now called the Empire Test Pilots School, one of a succession of schools with the Empire prefix. It served the Air Forces of the British Empire and has been attended by experienced pilots from around the world.

== Working alongside QinetiQ ==
The MOD conducts its flight test and military evaluation activities in a public-private partnering arrangement with QinetiQ. The Armed Forces provide specialist personnel to work in partnership with QinetiQ. For regulatory purposes the QinetiQ-MOD partnering arrangement that is approved to conduct flight testing is referred to as the Air Test and Evaluation Centre (ATEC).
