= No. 42 (Expeditionary Support) Wing RAF =

- Wing Badge
- Active: November 2007–present
- Country: United Kingdom
- Branch: Royal Air Force
- Type: Engineering
- Size: Wing
- Part of: No. 2 Group RAF
- Garrison/HQ: RAF Wittering
- Mottos: Latin: "Fulmen Alatum Tenemus"; English: We hold in readiness the winged thunderbolts
- Website: RAF Wittering

No. 42 (Expeditionary Support) Wing RAF is a wing of the Royal Air Force A4 Force based at RAF Wittering. It provides high readiness, specialist engineering support for air operations around the world.

42 (ES) Wing was formed in November 2007 to provide a command structure for the Royal Air Force's engineering Air Combat Service Support Units (ACSSUs). Its name and badge are taken from that of No. 42 Group, which was responsible for Royal Air Force bomb and fuel storage during World War II. The Wing motto 'Fulmen Alatum Tenemus' translates as 'We hold in readiness the winged thunderbolts'.

== Structure ==
The wing consists of:

- No. 71 Inspection and Repair (IR) Squadron
- No. 93 Expeditionary Armaments (EA) Squadron
- No. 5001 Squadron
- Joint Aircraft Recovery and Transportation Squadron

== Commanding Officers ==
2007 Aug-Oct: Sqn Ldr J S Phillips

2007 - 2009: Wing Commander AJ Knight

2009 - 2011: Wing Commander PM Saul

2011 - 2014: Wing Commander CD Tucker

2014 - 2016: Wing Commander BM Plant

2016 - 2018: Wing Commander CS Watson

2018 - 2020: Wing Commander DA Penter

2020 - 2022: Wing Commander MJ Dutton

2022 - 2025 : Wing Commander MPC Smith

2025 - : Wing Commander A R Clarke
