= RAF Pembroke Dock =

Former Royal Air Force station in Pembrokeshire, Wales

RAF Pembroke Dock
- Pembroke Dock, Pembrokeshire in Wales
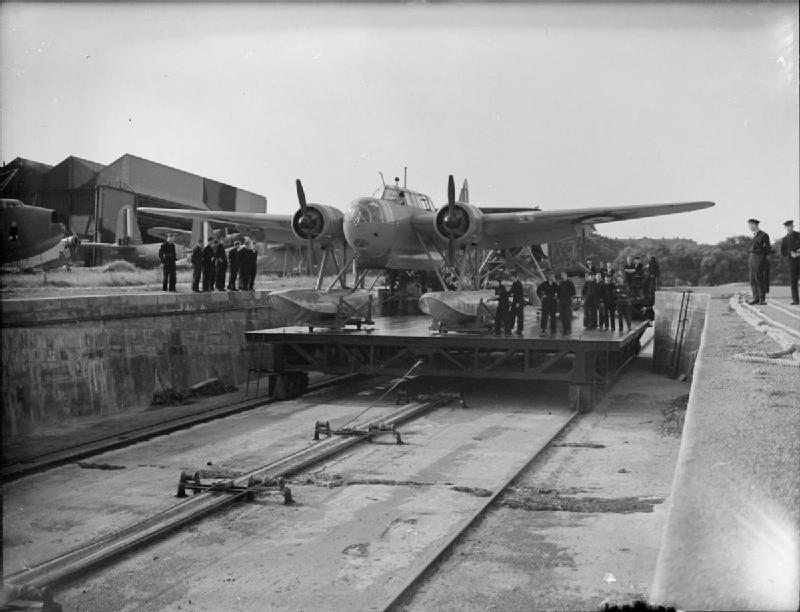
- A Fokker T-VIIIW seaplane of No. 320 (Dutch) Squadron RAF, attended by Dutch Naval groundcrew, being taken down to the water on a carrier at Pembroke Dock, Pembrokeshire

Site information
- Type: Seaplane and Flying boat station
- Code: PM
- Owner: Air Ministry
- Operator: Royal Air Force
- Controlled by: RAF Coastal Command
- Open to the public: Limited – now a ferry terminal

Location
- Coordinates: 51°41′44″N 04°57′11″W

Site history
- Built: 1930
- In use: 1930–1959
- Battles/wars: European theatre of World War II; *Battle of the Atlantic

Garrison information
- Past commanders: Sir Arthur Harris(as Wg Cdr)

Royal Air Force Pembroke Dock, or more simply RAF Pembroke Dock, was a Royal Air Force Seaplane and Flying boat station located at Pembroke Dock, Pembrokeshire, Wales. The Royal Navy contingent left in 1926 with the Royal Air Force occupying the site from 1 January 1930. During the initial stages of the Second World War, it became the home of two Dutch flying boats and their squadron personnel as well as hosting RAF, Fleet Air Arm, Royal Canadian Air Force, Royal Australian Air Force and United States naval aircrews.

It became the largest Flying Boat station in the world and at one point during the Second World War it was host to 99 aircraft.

The station badge showed a Manx Shearwater bird on one of the many islands that lie off the eastern Pembrokeshire coastline. The motto was in Welsh; Gwylio'r gorllewin o'r awyr which translates into English as "To watch the west from the air". The badge was approved and issued in January 1948.

== History ==
Despite the Royal Navy abruptly withdrawing from Pembroke Dock in 1926, the haven along the Daugleddau estuary had been used by seaplanes of the Royal Naval Air Service and the Royal Air Force before a permanent seaplane air base was established. The Royal Air Force arrived in Pembroke Dock on 1 January 1930 with the first Squadron, No. 210 Sqn, arriving in June 1931. Throughout the 1930s, No. 210 Sqn was the main Squadron operating from RAF Pembroke Dock and was equipped firstly with Supermarine Southampton, Short Rangoon and Short Singapore III aircraft.

The base was located on the south side of the Milford Haven Waterway opposite the town of Milford Haven. The base was on a promontory which restricted space for buildings due to the local housing in the area.

Initially, the seaplane service only operated and carried out maintenance from a specially adapted floating dock known as HMS Flat Iron. This floating dock was able to submerge and allow two seaplanes to navigate onto it and then raise itself back up to allow for complex maintenance. During the 1930s the Royal Air Force improved RAF Pembroke Dock by the installation of two 'B' and one 'T' hangar and in 1938, the floating dock was towed to Invergordon as it was redundant. In 1935, the first spillway was constructed which allowed aircraft to be removed from the water whatever the tide. During this period, Sir Arthur Travers Harris (Bomber Harris) was the Officer Commanding of RAF Pembroke Dock and No. 210 Sqn, as a Wing Commander.

RAF Pembroke Dock had two spillways; one was 1,121 feet (342 m) with a mechanical winch and the other was 199 feet (61 m). A third spillway was located at Neyland on the other side of the estuary to Pembroke Dock.

In 1934, No. 230 Sqn was reformed at RAF Pembroke Dock, having been disbanded in 1922. The Squadron would leave and return four times over the history of the base, but it was not active at Pembroke Dock during the Second World War. Its longest stay at the base was between February 1949 and February 1957.

In July 1936, RAF Pembroke Dock became part of the newly formed RAF Coastal Command and would remain so until it closed down. It was assigned to No. 15 Group RAF with the headquarters being at Plymouth, but by 1941, 15 Group was assigned to Liverpool and Pembroke Dock became part of No. 19 Group RAF. In 1938, its entry in the Air Force List designated it as belonging to No. 16 Group RAF, as a reconnaissance base. From 1938 onwards, Short Sunderland aircraft began arriving to replace older aircraft (Short Singapore and Supermarine Stranraer) on Nos. 210 and 228 Sqns. The Sunderland became synonymous with the base and No. 210 Sqn and was the workhorse during the Second World War. In December 1936, No. 228 Sqn was stood up after having previously been disbanded at RNAS Killingholme. During the decade between 1936 and 1945, No. 228 Sqn was allocated to RAF Pembroke Dock 5 times, often for short intervals where individual aircraft from the Squadron were detached out to other bases.

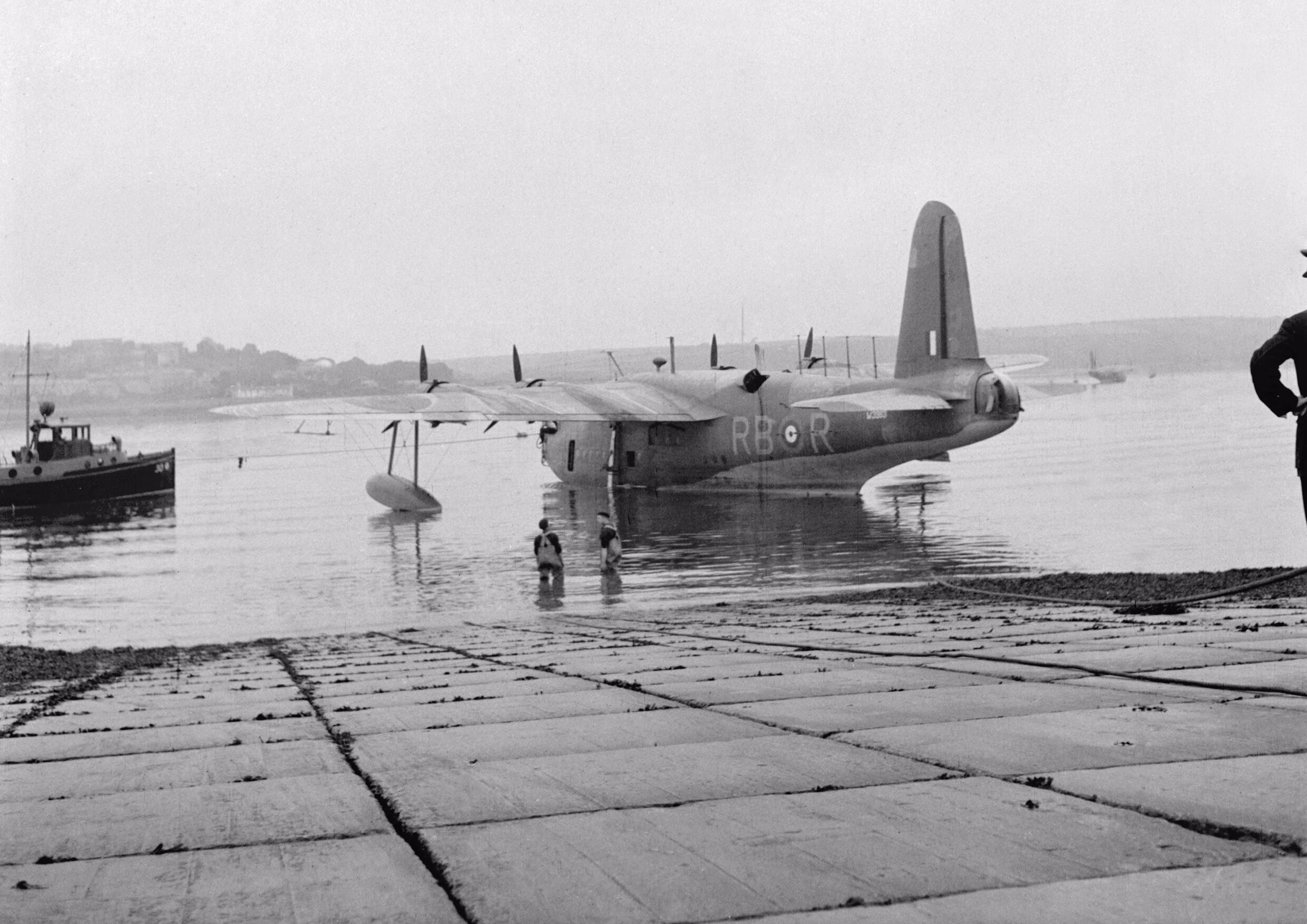
Sunderland II W3983/RB-R of No 10 Squadron RAAF, about to be brought out of the water at Pembroke Dock, 3 October 1941. Neyland is the headland on the opposite side of the estuary

On 1 June 1940, several seaplanes of the Royal Netherlands Naval Air Service escaped from their bases in the Netherlands as they were being overrun by enemy forces. They flew to RAF Pembroke Dock where they became No. 320 (Netherlands) Sqn before RAF Carew Cheriton became their home base. Other nations that flew from Pembroke Dock including Canadians and the United States Navy. The Navy VP-63 flew Consolidated PBY Catalina aircraft and on arrival in 1943, was the first US Navy unit to operate in Europe

In 1940, a request for lodger facilities and a Royal Naval Air Section and a single seaplane squadron at RAF Pembroke Dock was granted. 764 Naval Air Squadron, an Advanced Seaplane Conversion Squadron, equipped with Supermarine Walrus amphibian aircraft, Fairey Seafox and Fairey Swordfish floatplanes, arrived from RNAS Lee-on-Solent on the 3 July 1940.

From May 1941, the squadron started utilising another site, up river at Lawrenny, however, in response to Luftwaffe air raids on Pembroke Docks, in October 1941 the Air Section was withdrawn and 764 NAS moved to RNAS Lawrenny Ferry.

The flying boat squadrons operating from Pembroke Dock, were occupied with a myriad of tasks during the Second World War. Principal among these was Air Sea Rescue (ASR) with which most aircraft were equipped with Lindholme Gear for dropping into the sea for downed aircrews. The squadron also had responsibility for convoy escort duties in the Atlantic and also as hunter killers in Anti-Submarine Warfare (ASW). On 2 June 1943, a Short Sunderland of No. 461 Sqn (11 Crew, 9 Australian, 2 British) was attacked whilst on an ASR patrol over the Bay of Biscay by 8 Junkers Ju 88 fighter aircraft. The Sunderland had been searching the Bay of Biscay area for a downed British Overseas Airways Corporation (BOAC) aircraft that had been shot down over that area the previous day (and included amongst its passenger manifest the actor Leslie Howard) when it was attacked by the Luftwaffe. The crew managed to down three of the enemy aircraft, but limped home with an airframe like a colander due to the strafing bullet runs that the Junkers 88s had taken against it. The aircraft was landed hard at Praa Sands in Cornwall and whilst most of the crew were injured, there was only one fatality. The tide destroyed the airframe the next day.

In 1944, No. 201 Sqn was transferred from RAF Castle Archdale in Northern Ireland to help blockade the invasion area for D-Day. The plan was to prevent U-Boats from being able to enter the area and enter into combat with allied forces.

Three Sunderlands from No. 230 Sqn were part of a 640 flying aircraft display put on at RAF Odiham for the Queen's Coronation Review. The display, held in June 1953, took exactly 27 minutes from start to finish. Throughout the 1950s, Sunderlands of Nos. 201 and 230 Sqns ferried scientists and support staff to and from the North Greenland expeditions. No. 230 Sqn even adopted a Husky mascot puppy when bringing everyone including the dogs back to Britain in 1954.

The last flying boat squadrons to operate from RAF Pembroke Dock were disbanded on 28 February 1957. A month later the base was put on a care and maintenance programme with final closure coming in 1959.

== Squadrons ==
The various squadrons and units that were based at RAF Pembroke Dock are listed below.

| Number | Dates | Notes |
|---|---|---|
| No. 1 Marine Craft Training School | | The MCTS main effort was at RAF Calshot, but was moved around in the Second World War to RAF Corsewall, RAF Felixstowe and RAF Pembroke Dock. |
| 4 (Coastal) Operational Training Unit | Aug 1946 – Jul 1947 | Transferred to RAF Calshot in 1946, but still operating as a detachment until 1947. |
| 10 Squadron RAAF | Sept 1939 – ? | One of two Royal Australian Air Force squadrons to operate out of RAF Pembroke Dock during the Second World War. |
| 95 Squadron | 16 Jan – 18 Mar 1941 | 3 Sunderlands from No 210 Squadron were assigned to the newly reformed No 95 Squadron at Pembroke Dock. The squadron left for Malta in March 1941. |
| 119 Squadron | 4 Aug - Oct 1941; 6 Sept 1942 – 17 Apr 1943 | The Squadron came to Pembroke Dock in 1941 and became non-operational before being stood up at Lough Erne. Returning for to Pembroke Dock for six months from September 1942 before being disbanded again in April 1943. |
| 201 Squadron | 8 Apr - 3 Nov 1944; 18 Jan 1949 – 28 Feb 1957 | First came from over from Northern Ireland to cover operations on D-Day and returned for a longer period in 1949. |
| 203 Squadron | Jun 1935 – Mar 1940 | Detachment served at Pembroke Dock for almost 5 years. |
| 204 Squadron | Jun 1941 | Detachment of Sunderland II aircraft, then operating from Reykjavik. |
| 209 Squadron | 12 Jul 1940 - 3 Jan 1941; 10 Oct 1941 – 30 Mar 1942 | Stayed only for 5 months on two short tours. |
| 210 Squadron | 15 Jun 1931 – 28 Sept 1935; 7 Aug 1936 – 22 Sept 1937; 18 Dec 1937 – 29 Sept 1938; 8 Oct 1938 – 23 Oct 1939; 4 Oct 1942 – 21 Apr 1943 | The Squadron sent a detachment back to Pembroke Dock for a year between June 1944 and June 1945. |
| 228 Squadron | 15 Dec 1936 – 29 Sept 1938; 9 Oct 1938 – 5 Jun 1939; 10 Sept 1939 – 10 Jun 1940; 4 May 1943 – 4 Jun 1945 | |
| 230 Squadron | 1 Dec 1934 – 23 Sept 1935; 3 Aug – 14 Oct 1936; 15 Apr – 10 Aug 1946; 25 Feb 1949 – 28 Feb 1957 | Reformed at Pembroke Dock after having previously been disbanded in May 1922. |
| 235 OCU | 1948 – ? | Transferred in from RAF Calshot. |
| 240 Squadron | 27 May 1940 – 39 Jul 1941 | |
| 308 Ferry Training Unit | Mar 1943 – Jan 1944 | RAF Pembroke Dock was part of 19 Group Coastal Command, but No. 3 Flying Boat Servicing Unit would repair and maintain other non 19 Group aircraft. No. 308 FTU was set up to ferry the aircraft to and from Pembroke Dock. |
| 320 (Netherlands) Squadron RAF | 1 Jun - 1 Oct 1940 | Formed at RAF Pembroke Dock. |
| 321 (Dutch) Squadron RAF | 1 - 24 Jun 1940 | Formed at RAF Pembroke Dock, but moved in same month to RAF Carew Cheriton. |
| 461 Squadron RAAF | 20 Apr 1942 – 4 June 1945 | Formed at RAF_Mount_Batten and flew Sunderlands. Was the first Dominion Squadron to become operational. |
| 764 Naval Air Squadron | 3 Jul 1940 – 4 Oct 1941 | Fleet Air Arm Squadron. Transferred out due to concerns of overcrowding and vulnerability to aerial bombing. |
| 1115 Marine Craft Unit | | |
| VP-63 | Jul – Dec 1943 | Flew Catalina aircraft. Moved to North Africa. |
| Flying Boat Training Squadron | 17 Oct 1953 - 5 Oct 1956 | Reformed from 235 OCU personnel and aircraft. |

== Post RAF ==
The eastern hangar was used in 1979 for a project nicknamed the Magic Roundabout to build a full-scale Millennium Falcon for use in the Star Wars film The Empire Strikes Back.

== Heritage ==
=== Station badge and motto ===
Royal Air Force Station Pembroke Dock's badge, which was approved and issued in January 1948, featured a Manx Shearwater seabird on one of the many islands that lie off the eastern Pembrokeshire coastline.

The station's Welsh motto; Gwylio'r gorllewin o'r awyr which translates into English as "To watch the west from the air".

=== Built heritage ===
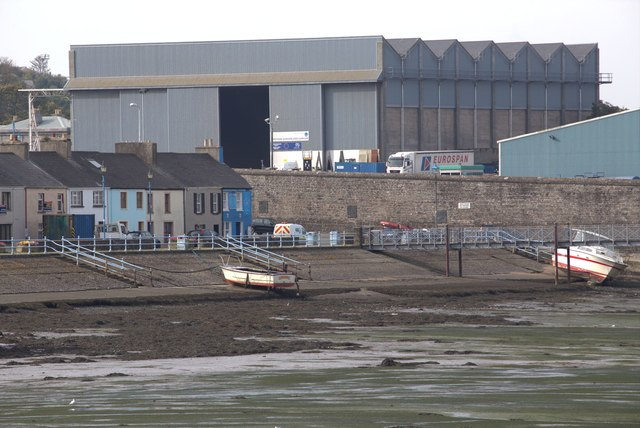
One of the two Sunderland hangars

The two large 'B' type hangars have survived and are now both listed buildings. Other parts of the dockyard, such as the spillways have been lost in the reconstruction of the dock for the cross Irish Sea ferry to Rosslare.

The Pembroke Dock Heritage Centre operates on part of the site. It is located in the former chapel of the Royal Dockyard and now houses a replica Sunderland cockpit with working controls that allow for a simulated flight over Milford Haven's estuary.

=== Aircraft ===
In 1963, a Sunderland formerly of No. 201 Squadron was presented to the town by the French Navy. She was cleaned and repaired so that it could be displayed in the town. Due to the age and weather exposure of the aircraft, she was moved to the Royal Air Force Museum Hendon in 1971.

There has been a concerted effort to raise a Sunderland flying boat that sank during a fierce storm in 1940. It was rediscovered in 2006 after a fisherman found his lobster-pot was tied fast around the sunken airframe on the seabed. The aircraft (T9044) has lain underneath 60 feet (18 m) of water since 1940 and has had various parts of its airframe already lifted out and cleaned to be put on display. It was the subject of an episode of the Channel 4 documentary series Wreck Detectives, which was filmed in 2003 and broadcast in 2004.
