= 764 Naval Air Squadron =

Inactive flying squadron of the Royal Navy's Fleet Air Arm

- Squadron badge
- Active: 1940–1943; 1944–1945; 1953–1954; 1955–1972; 2008–onwards
- Country: United Kingdom
- Branch: Royal Navy
- Type: Fleet Air Arm Second Line Squadron
- Role: Advance Seaplane Training Squadron; User Trials Unit; Advanced Training Squadron; Fighter Pilot Holding Unit; Air Weapons Training Flight; Commanding Officers and Senior Pilots Designate Course; Jet Fighter Pilot Pool; Target Towing Unit; Air Warfare Instructor Training; Initial Training Squadron
- Size: Squadron
- Part of: Fleet Air Arm
- Home station: See Naval air stations section for full list.
- Mottos: Experientia expertus (Latin for 'Tested by trials')
- Aircraft: See Aircraft operated section for full list.

Insignia
- Squadron Badge Description: Barry wavy of six white and blue, a balance gold (1945)
- Identification Markings: Y9A+ (Swordfish) unmarked (Walrus, Seafox and Kingfisher); 100-116 (Seafire from May 1953); 243-250 (Firefly from May 1953); 251-256 (Sea Hawk from February 1955); 161-175 (Wyvern from February 1955); 689-714 (all types from January 1956)
- Fin Shore Codes: LM:VL (from May 1953); FD (from February 1955)

764 Naval Air Squadron (764 NAS) was a Fleet Air Arm (FAA) naval air squadron of the United Kingdom’s Royal Navy (RN). It initially formed in April 1940, at HMS Daedalus, RNAS Lee-on-Solent, as an Advance Seaplane Training Squadron. The Squadron moved to RAF Pembroke Dock in July 1940, and later to HMS Daedalus II, RNAS Lawrenny Ferry in October 1941 and remaining there until the Squadron disbanded in November 1943. It reformed at HMS Siskin, RNAS Gosport, in February 1944, as the User Trials Unit, however, the squadron was decommissioned for the second time in September 1945. 764 Naval Air Squadron reformed again, at HMS Fulmar, RNAS Lossiemouth, in May 1953, where it became an Advanced Training Unit. It moved to HMS Heron, RNAS Yeovilton, in September 1953, where it received its first jet aircraft. In November 1954 the Squadron disbanded.

It reformed in February 1955, at HMS Peregrine, RNAS Ford, as a Fighter Pilot Holding Unit and equipped exclusively with jets. However, starting in the May, the squadron also provided Westland Wyvern aircraft type conversion for the next couple of years. In June 1957, 764 Naval Air Squadron moved to HMS Fulmar, RNAS Lossiemouth, utilising its satellite airfield, HMS Fulmar II, RNAS Milltown, and with it a change to multiple training roles: Air Weapons Training, Commanding Officers and Senior Pilots Designate Course, a Jet Fighter Pool and a Target Towing Unit. With Hawker Hunter aircraft arriving in December 1958, the squadrons primary duty was Air Warfare Instructor training. It also undertook swept wing conversion to the Hawker Hunter. From March to November 1965 a ‘B’ flight was formed at HMS Fulmar, to train Airwork Limited pilots to fly Supermarine Scimitar aircraft. In July 1972, 764 Naval Air Squadron disbanded at HMS Fulmar.

764 Naval Air Squadron reformed as a non-flying squadron at HMS Sultan, in October 2008, as the Initial Training Squadron, as part of the Royal Naval Air Engineering & Survival School (RNAESS), within the Defence School of Aeronautical Engineering (DSAE) to simulate a squadron environment for training of Air Engineer Officers', Air Engineering Technicians and Survival Equipment ratings.

== History ==
=== Advance Seaplane Training Squadron (1940-1943) ===
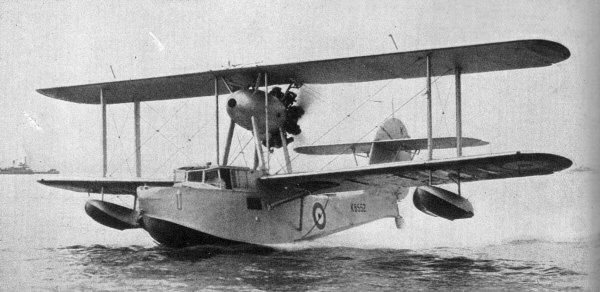
Supermarine Walrus of the type used by 746 NAS

764 Naval Air Squadron formed on the 8 April 1940, as an Advance Seaplane Training Squadron, at RNAS Lee-on-Solent (HMS Daedalus), situated near Lee-on-the-Solent in Hampshire. It was equipped with Supermarine Walrus amphibian aircraft, along with Fairey Seafox and Fairey Swordfish floatplanes. When the trainees had passed the conversion course at Lee-on Solent they boarded the seaplane carrier, HMS Pegasus, for catapult training.

Lodger facilities, for a RN Air Section at RAF Pembroke Dock, a Royal Air Force Seaplane and Flying Boat station located at Pembroke Dock, Pembrokeshire, Wales, were granted to the Royal Navy and 764 Naval Air Squadron moved there on the 3 July 1940, leaving behind its Fairey Seafox aircraft. From August 1940, the squadron was providing the Seaplane Flying Training Course Part II (765 Naval Air Squadron provided Part I, where the Fairey Seafox aircraft ended up). Around May 1941, aircraft from 764 NAS started using Lawrenny Ferry, a Royal Naval established seaplane facility used to train Fleet Air Arm pilots in the art of flying seaplanes, which was situated 3 miles (5 km) north east of Pembroke Docks on the north side of the junction of the Cresswell and Carew rivers.

The Fairey Swordfish floatplanes were withdrawn in September 1941. However, in response to Luftwaffe air raids on Pembroke Docks, in October 1941 the Air Section was withdrawn and 764 Naval Air Squadron moved to RNAS Lawrenny Ferry (HMS Daedalus II). It arrived with eight Supermarine Walrus and one Fairey Swordfish floatplane, which was soon withdrawn and the Supermarine Walrus was the main aircraft operated. In July 1942, Vought Kingfisher, an observation floatplane aircraft, arrived. The need for Seaplane Training had diminished by the middle of 1943 and eventually 764 Naval Air Squadron disbanded at RNAS Lawrenny Ferry (HMS Daedalus II) on 7 November 1943.

=== User Trials Unit (1944-1945) ===
764 Naval Air Squadron reformed at RAF Gosport, situated in Gosport, Hampshire, England, on 19 February 1944, as the User Trials Unit. It was initially equipped with three Fairey Barracuda Mk II torpedo and dive bomber aircraft and three Grumman Avenger Mk II, an American torpedo bomber aircraft. On the 1 July 1944, the squadron moved to RNAS Lee-on-Solent (HMS Daedalus), located near Lee-on-the-Solent, in Hampshire and immediately a ’B’ flight was formed as a Tactician Trials flight. This flight was equipped with Blackburn Firebrand strike fighter aircraft.

A further detachment from 764 NAS then operated out of RNAS Machrihanish (HMS Landrail), constructed close to Campbeltown in Argyll and Bute, Scotland. Its designated role was a Torpedo Trials Flight. In September 1944, on completion of net defence trials in the river Clyde, this detachment was absorbed into 778 Naval Air Squadron. On the 1 October 1944, 'B' flight was re-designated 708 Naval Air Squadron. In June 1945, the squadron then received Fairey Firefly, a carrier-based fighter and anti-submarine aircraft, however, approximately three months later, 764 NAS disbanded on the 1 September 1945.

=== Advanced Training Squadron (1953-1954) ===
764 Naval Air Squadron reformed, out of 'A' Flight of 766 Naval Air Squadron, on the 18 May 1953, as an Advanced Training Squadron at RNAS Lossiemouth (HMS Fulmar), located on the western edge of the town of Lossiemouth in Moray, north-east Scotland. It was equipped initially with Supermarine Seafire and Fairey Firefly aircraft. The squadron provided training for Part 1 of the Operational Flying School course. 764 NAS remained at Lossiemouth for four months, relocating to RNAS Yeovilton (HMS Heron) sited a few miles north of Yeovil, in Somerset, on the 23 September 1953.

The squadron received its first jet aircraft in May 1954 when it added three Hawker Sea Hawk day fighter to operate alongside its piston engined, thirteen Supermarine Seafire and six Fairey Firefly aircraft. 764 NAS continued in its training role at RNAS Yeovilton for a further five months, disbanding there on the 23 November 1954.

=== Fighter Pilot Holding Unit (1955-1957) ===
764 Naval Air Squadron reformed, on the 1 February 1955, at RNAS Ford (HMS Peregrine), located at Ford, in West Sussex, England, as a Fighter Pilot Holding Unit. Here it was equipped with Hawker Sea Hawk, de Havilland Sea Vampire jet fighter and later Westland Wyvern, a turboprop powered strike aircraft. 764 NAS initially worked with ten Hawker Sea Hawk and ten de Havilland Sea Vampire aircraft, and these enabled the squadron to provide conversion for United States trained personnel to British standards and procedures where required, and to provide valuable flying time to Fleet Air Arm pilots prior their posting to a first-line squadron. With the de Havilland Sea Vampire being dual controlled, this also enabled the squadron to provide tuition for fighter combat and ground attack techniques. In May 1955, the squadron received two Westland Wyvern aircraft. On the 1 March 1956, 767 Naval Air Squadron, formed as a Fighter Pool Squadron from part of 764 Naval Air Squadron and was equipped with some of the latter's Hawker Sea Hawk F.2 aircraft, however, in the same month, 764 NAS received Hawker Sea Hawk FB.3 aircraft. For nearly two years the Westland Wyvern aircraft were being used for type conversion training, however, in February 1957, this part of the squadron became an independent Wyvern Conversion Flight.

=== RNAS Lossiemouth / RNAS Milltown (1957-1972) ===
764 Naval Air Squadron moved, on the 21 June 1957, to RNAS Lossiemouth (HMS Fulmar), Scotland. It took with it its Hawker Sea Hawk FB.3 aircraft and in the July it received the Hawker Sea Hawk FGA.4, the initial fighter ground attack variant. The Squadron acquired four roles at RNAS Lossiemouth and these were, Air Weapons Training, a Commanding Officers and Senior Pilots Designate Course, a Jet Fighter Pool and a Target Towing Unit. The squadron operated out of RNAS Lossiemouth's satellite airfield, RNAS Milltown (HMS Fulmar II), located about 3.6 miles (5.8 km) north east of Elgin, Scotland.

In December 1957, 764 Naval Air Squadron received two-seat Gloster Meteor T.7 jet trainer aircraft, however, these were soon withdrawn from the squadron in March 1958. Later in the year, in October, it started operating Hawker Sea Hawk FGA.6s and then in December, two-seat Hawker Hunter T.8 jet trainers. 1959 saw considerable change in the aircraft operated by 764 Naval Air Squadron. In February a small number of the Supermarine Scimitar, a single-seat naval strike jet, arrived. These were withdrawn in the following May. The Sea Hawks were withdrawn by July, and therefore, by August 1959, the squadron was equipped solely with twelve Hawker Hunter T.8 two-seat trainers.

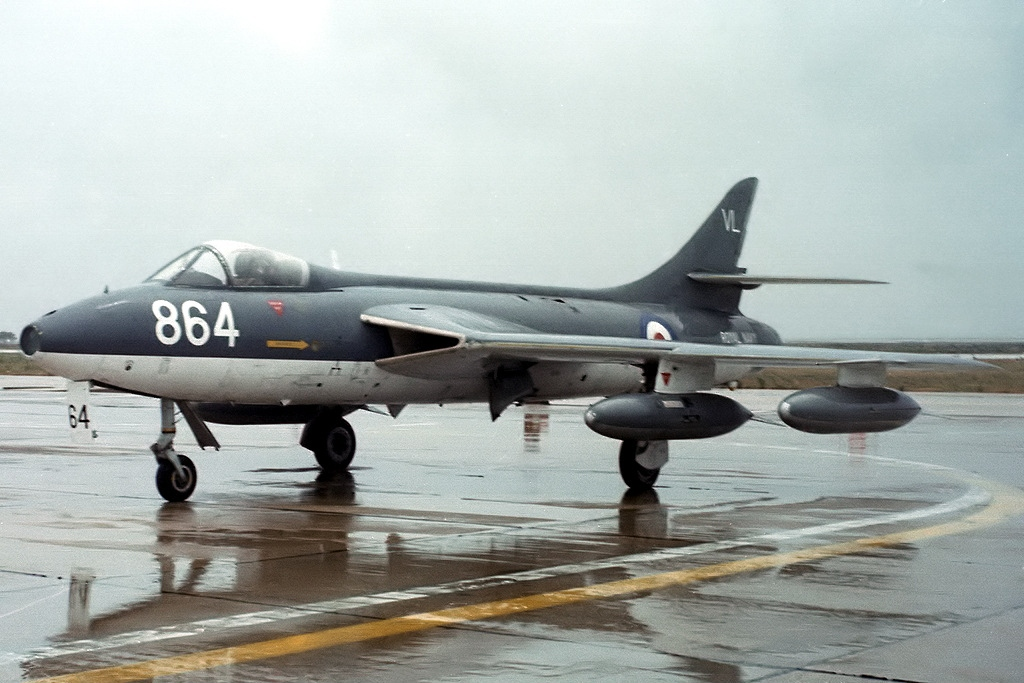
Hawker Hunter GA.11, XE689, has three spells with 764 NAS between 1963 and 1972.

In March 1959, the squadron's role changed. It retained only the Commanding Officers and Senior Pilots Designates Course from before and its new main role was Air Warfare Instructor Training, but also provided a swept wing conversion course to the Hawker Hunter T.8 aircraft. In July 1962, 764 Naval Air Squadron received a number of Hawker Hunter GA.11 aircraft, a single-seat weapons training version for the Royal Navy also fitted with an arrester hook, which replaced several of the Hawker Hunter T.8 aircraft. Reconnaissance cameras were fitted to three Hunter GA.11 aircraft, by Short Brothers, based in Belfast, Northern Ireland during the mid-1960s, thus becoming Hunter PR.11 aircraft. On the 26 March 1965 764B Naval Air Squadron was formed, out of the disbanding 736 Naval Air Squadron, absorbing its Supermarine Scimitar aircraft. 764B had been formed to provide training to Airwork pilots to fly the Supermarine Scimitar aircraft, but it disbanded in the November having completed the training. In 1968 the main 764 Naval Air Squadron received Hawker Hunter T.8B and T.8C aircraft, both variants were fitted with TACAN navigation systems.

On the 27 July 1972, 764 Naval Air Squadron disbanded at Lossiemouth.

=== Initial Training Squadron (2008-present) ===
764 Naval Air Squadron reformed at HMS Sultan, Gosport, Hampshire, on the 1 October 2008, as the Initial Training Squadron, within the Royal Naval Air Engineering & Survival School (RNAESS), simulating a squadron environment for training purposes.

764 Initial Training Squadron, is a non-flying squadron which forms part of Royal Naval Air Engineering & Survival School (RNAESS), based at HMS Sultan, which is located at Gosport in Hampshire. The RNAESS forms part of the Defence School of Aeronautical Engineering, which provides training for aircraft engineering officers and tradesmen across the three British armed forces. This specialises in the education of Air Engineer Officers, Air Engineering Technicians, and Survival Equipment ratings, preparing them for operational roles or additional training opportunities. Situated within the Daedalus building, the facility features six distinct wings, each designated for specific training disciplines. The school offers both foundational and advanced instruction in air engineering and survival equipment.

764 Initial Training Squadron provides an initial fourteen week course dedicated to training, where participants acquire fundamental skills in aircraft maintenance necessary for their qualification as technicians. Upon completing this rigorous program, they advance to and operational Royal Naval Air Station to receive specialised training on their designated aircraft types, specifically the AgustaWestland Merlin HM2, HC4/HC4A or AgustaWestland Wildcat HMA2.

== Aircraft operated ==
The squadron has operated a number of different aircraft types, including:

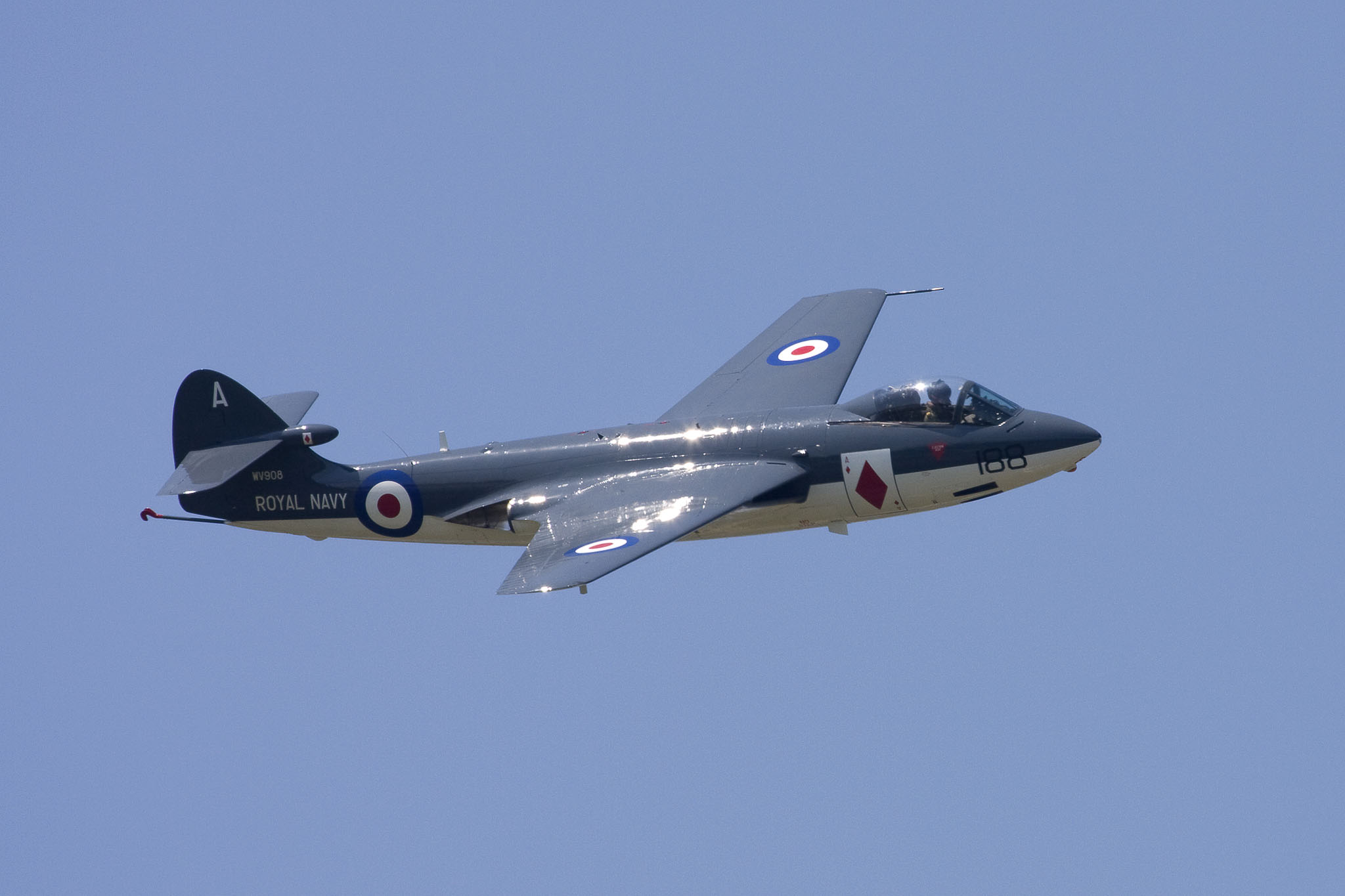
Hawker Sea Hawk FGA 6

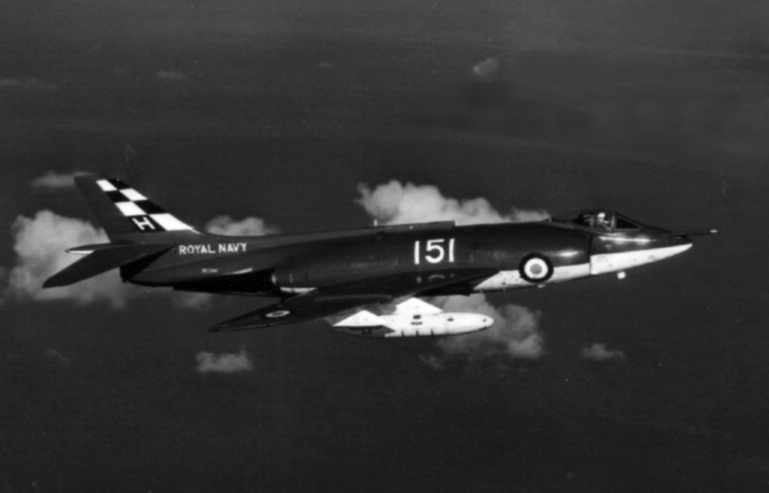
Supermarine Scimitar F.1

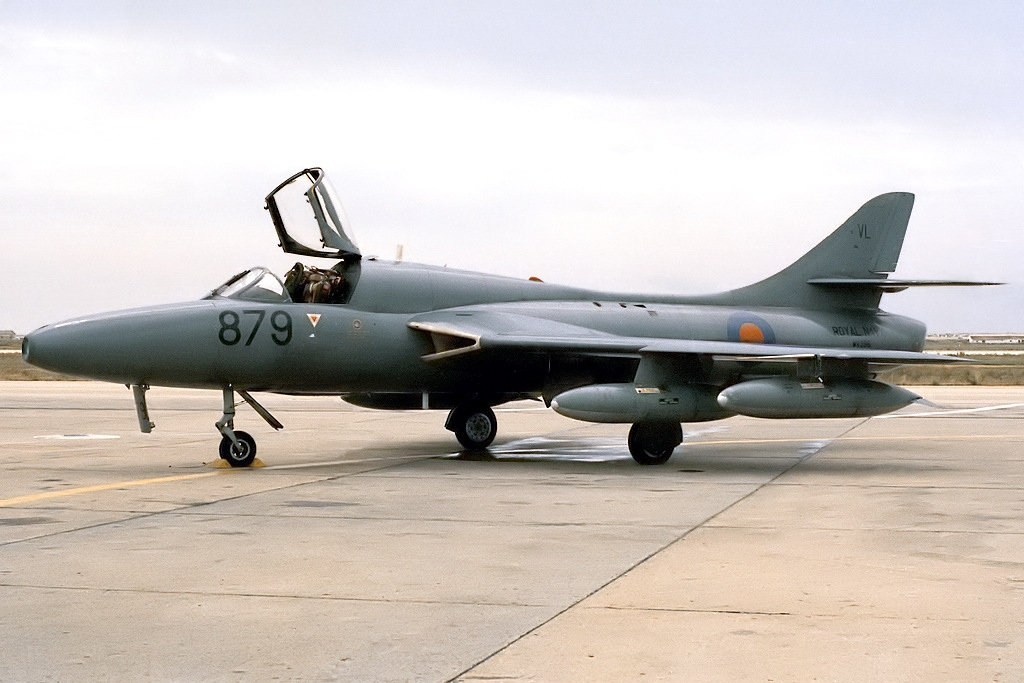
Hawker Hunter T.8C

- Fairey Seafox I reconnaissance floatplane (April 1940 - November 1940)
- Fairey Swordfish I/FP floatplane torpedo bomber (April 1940 - September 1941)
- Supermarine Walrus I amphibious maritime reconnaissance aircraft (April 1940 - November 1943)
- Blackburn Roc fighter aircraft (1941)
- Vought Kingfisher I observation floatplane (July 1942 - November 1943)
- Fairey Barracuda Mk II torpedo and dive bomber (February 1944 - August 1945)
- Grumman Avenger Mk.II torpedo bomber (February 1944 - April 1944)
- Fairey Firefly I fighter aircraft (June 1945 - August 1945)
- Supermarine Seafire F Mk XVII fighter aircraft (May 1953 - November 1954)
- Fairey Firefly T.Mk 2 armed operational training aircraft (May 1953 - November 1954)
- Fairey Firefly T.Mk 1 training aircraft (November 1953 - November 1954)
- Hawker Sea Hawk F1 jet day fighter aircraft (May 1954 - June 1957)
- de Havilland Sea Vampire T.22 jet trainer aircraft (January 1955 - June 1957)
- Hawker Sea Hawk F2 jet day fighter aircraft (February 1955 - June 1957)
- de Havilland Sea Vampire F.20 jet fighter aircraft (June 1955 - February 1956)
- de Havilland Sea Vampire F.21 jet fighter aircraft (July 1955 - March 1956)
- Westland Wyvern S.4 strike aircraft (July 1955 - May 1957)
- Hawker Sea Hawk FB 3 jet fighter-bomber (March 1956 - January 1959)
- Hawker Sea Hawk FGA 4 jet fighter ground-attack aircraft (July 1957 - July 1959)
- Gloster Meteor T.7 jet trainer aircraft (December 1957 - March 1958)
- Hawker Sea Hawk FGA 6 jet fighter ground-attack aircraft (October 1958 - July 1959)
- Hawker Hunter T.8 jet trainer aircraft (December 1958 - July 1972)
- Supermarine Scimitar F.1 strike fighter (February 1959 - May 1959)
- Hawker Hunter GA.11 jet trainer aircraft (July 1962 - July 1972)
- Hawker Hunter PR.11 jet reconnaissance aircraft (July 1962 - July 1972)
- Hawker Hunter T.8B jet trainer aircraft (TACAN fitted) (November 1958 - July 1972)
- Hawker Hunter T.8C jet trainer aircraft (TACAN fitted) (November 1958 - July 1972)

=== 764B Flight ===
- Blackburn Firebrand F. I strike fighter (September - October 1944)
- Supermarine Scimitar F.I strike fighter (March - November 1965)

== Naval air stations and Royal Navy shore establishment ==
764 Naval Air Squadron operated from a number of naval air stations of the Royal Navy, airbases overseas and a Royal Navy shore establishment:

1940 - 1943

- Royal Naval Air Station Lee-on-Solent (HMS Daedalus) / HMS Pegasus (1934) (8 April 1940 - 3 July 1940)
- Royal Air Force Pembroke Dock / HMS Pegasus (3 July 1940 - October 1941)
- Royal Naval Air Station Lawrenny Ferry (HMS Daedalus II) / HMS Pegasus (October 1941 - 7 November 1943)
- disbanded - (7 November 1943)

1944 - 1945

- RAF Gosport / Royal Naval Air Station Gosport (HMS Siskin) from 1 August 1945 (19 February 1944 - 1 September 1945)
  - Royal Naval Air Station Crail (HMS Jackdaw) (Detachment 22 April 1944 - May 1945)
- disbanded - (1 September 1945)

1953 - 1954

- Royal Naval Air Station Lossiemouth (HMS Fulmar) (18 May 1953 - 23 September 1953)
- Royal Naval Air Station Yeovilton (HMS Heron) (23 September 1953 - 23 November 1954)
- disbanded - (23 November 1954)

1955 - 1972

- Royal Naval Air Station Ford (HMS Peregrine) (1 February 1955 - 21 June 1957)
- Royal Naval Air Station Lossiemouth (HMS Fulmar)
  - satellite airfield, Royal Naval Air Station Milltown (HMS Fulmar II) (21 June 1957 - 27 July 1972)
  - Royal Naval Air Station Yeovilton (HMS Heron) (Detachment 28 June - 8 July 1965)
  - Hyeres de la Palyvestre (Detachment 9 - 11 July 1965)
  - Hyeres de la Palyvestre (Detachment six aircraft 23 - 29 June 1967)
  - Karup (Detachment five aircraft 6 - 10 September 1967)
  - Karup (Detachment five aircraft 19 - 23 August 1968)
  - Karup (Detachment four aircraft 20 - 29 August 1970)
  - Hyeres de la Palyvestre (Detachment four aircraft 1–11 February 1971)
  - Skydstrup (Detachment four aircraft 2 - 10 September 1971)
  - Landivisiau (Detachment six aircraft 1 - 11 February 1972)
  - Karup (Detachment four aircraft 13 - 20 April 1972)
- disbanded - (27 July 1972)

2008 - present

- HMS Sultan (1 October 2008 – present)

=== 764B Flight ===
1944

- Royal Naval Air Station Lee-on-Solent (HMS Daedalus) (1 July 1944 - 1 October 1944)
- became 708 Naval Air Squadron - (1 October 1944)

1965

- Royal Naval Air Station Lossiemouth (HMS Fulmar) (26 March 1965 - 23 November 1965)
- disbanded (23 November 1965)

== Commanding officers ==
List of commanding officers of 764 Naval Air Squadron with date of appointment:

1940 - 1943

- Lieutenant Commander F.E.C. Judd, RN, from 8 April 1940
- Lieutenant Commander(A) H.L. McCulloch, RN, from 16 July 1940
- Lieutenant Commander H. Wright, RN, from 17 October 1941
- Lieutenant Commander M.B.P. Francklin, DSC, RN, from 1 August 1942
- Lieutenant Commander(A) W.J.R. MacWhirter, RN, from 17 January 1943
- Lieutenant D.H. Angel, RN, from 8 February 1943
- Lieutenant Commander(A) J.E. Mansfield, RNVR, from 10 April 1943
- Lieutenant Commander(A) J.O.B. Young, RN, from 16 June 1943
- disbanded - 7 November 1943

1944 - 1945

- Lieutenant Commander(A) E.D.J.R. Whatley, RN, from 19 February 1944
- Lieutenant Commander(A) D.L.R. Hutchinson, RNVR, from 19 April 1944
- Lieutenant K. Lee-White, RN, from 1 August 1944
- Lieutenant Commander(A) G.A. Donaghue, RNVR, from 20 November 1944
- Captain D.B.L. Smith, RM, from 3 June 1945
- disbanded - 1 September 1945

Note: Abbreviation (A) signifies Air Branch of the RN or RNVR.

1953 - 1954

- Lieutenant Commander P.S. Brewer, RN, from 18 May 1953
- Lieutenant Commander B. Bevans, DSC, RN, from 28 September 1953
- disbanded - 23 November 1954

1955 - 1972

- Lieutenant Commander D.F. Battinson, RN, from 1 February 1955
- Lieutenant Commander P.E. Atterton, RN, from 14 November 1956
- Lieutenant Commander J.W. Ayres, RN, from 15 April 1957
- Lieutenant Commander D.T. McKeown, RN, from 17 June 1957
- Lieutenant R.M.P Carne, RN, from 21 April 1959
- Lieutenant Commander J.C. Mather, RN, from 2 December 1960
- Lieutenant Commander J.N.S. Anderdon, RN, 10 January 1963
- Lieutenant Commander G.W.G. Hunt, RN, from 5 September 1964
- Lieutenant Commander M.F. Kennett, RN, from 3 November 1965
- Lieutenant Commander E. Cope, RN, from 27 April 1967
- Lieutenant Commander R.J. Northard, RN, from 6 September 1968
- Lieutenant Commander R.W. Edward, RN, from 6 May 1970
- disbanded - 27 July 1972

=== 764B Flight ===
- Lieutenant Commander J. Worth, RN, from 29 March 1965
- disbanded - 23 November 1965
