= RNAS Lawrenny Ferry =

Former Royal Naval Air Station in Pembrokeshire, Wales

RNAS Lawrenny Ferry HMS Daedalus II
- Lawrenny, Pembrokeshire in Wales
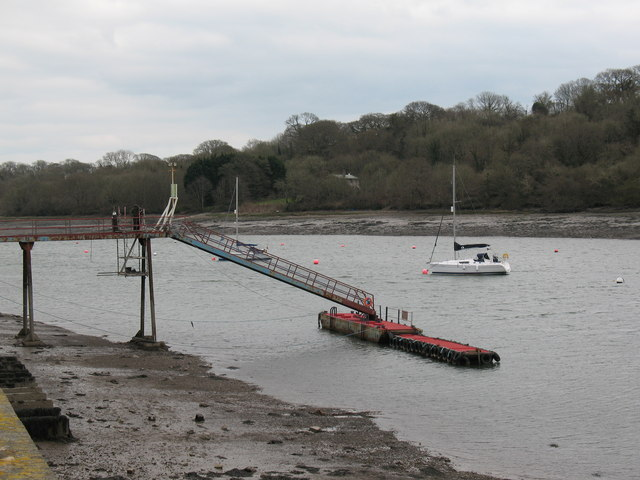
- Lawrenny Quay, the Fleet Air Arm flew seaplanes from this point during WW2

Site information
- Type: Seaplane and Flying boat station
- Owner: Admiralty
- Operator: Royal Navy
- Controlled by: Fleet Air Arm

Location
- Shown within Pembrokeshire RNAS Lawrenny Ferry (the United Kingdom)
- Coordinates: 51°43′5″N 004°52′40″W

Site history
- Built: 1941
- In use: 1943 - 1946
- Battles/wars: European theatre of World War II

Royal Naval Air Station Lawrenny Ferry, or more commonly known as RNAS Lawrenny Ferry; (commissioned HMS Daedalus II), was a former Royal Naval Air Station located near Lawrenny, Pembrokeshire, Wales. It was operational from 1941 to 1946, serving the Royal Navy from 1941 to 1943 after which it was placed into Care & Maintenance status.

The station was situated 3 miles (4.8 km) northeast of Pembroke Dock, on the north side of the junction where the river Cresswell and river Carew meet the Eastern Cleddau, the northern extension of Milford Haven.

== History ==
In early 1941, the Royal Navy made provisions for seaplane flying training at Lawrenny Ferry. 764 Seaplane Training Squadron used the facilities, which included a main hangar, three concrete aircraft pens, an eighteen-foot (5.5 m) slipway and fuel storage, before moving permanently from RAF Pembroke Dock. Accommodation consisted of two Nissen huts, however, officers and petty officers were housed at Lawrenny Castle, while the Lawrenny Arms pub acted as the NCOs' mess. Two steam yachts, named Carmela and Zaza, also provided accommodation for squadron personnel.

The base officially became a Royal Naval Air Station under the control of RNAS Lee-on-Solent (HMS Daedalus) and played a key role in Seaplane Flying Training Part II, which included Seaplane conversion and gunnery courses. RNAS Lawrenny Ferry was commissioned as Daedalus II on 1 February 1942.

However, with the decline in training demand, the base was reduced to Care and Maintenance status in November 1943, with only three months’ notice required to re-commission and resume flying. The nissen huts and hangar were demolished in 1945, though the base remained listed in the April 1946 Navy List.

== Royal Navy operations ==
=== Advance seaplane training squadron ===
764 Naval Air Squadron began using Lawrenny Ferry, while based at RAF Pembroke Dock, around May 1941 to train Fleet Air Arm pilots in the operation of seaplanes. However, in response to Luftwaffe air raids on Pembroke Dock, in October 1941 the Air Section was withdrawn from there and 764 NAS moved permanently to RNAS Lawrenny Ferry. Upon arrival, the squadron was equipped with eight Supermarine Walrus seaplane and one Fairey Swordfish floatplane. However, the swordfish was soon withdrawn, and the Walrus became the main aircraft in operation.

In July 1942, Vought OS2U Kingfisher aircraft were introduced to the squadron. The need for Seaplane Training had diminished by the middle of 1943 and eventually 764 NAS was officially disbanded at RNAS Lawrenny Ferry on 7 November 1943.

== Station commanders ==
Note: The ranks shown are the ranks held at the time of holding the appointment of commanding officer, Royal Naval Air Station Lawrenny Ferry.

- Lieutenant Commander(P) H. Wright, RN, 17 October 1941
- Lieutenant Commander(P) J. E. Mansfield, RN, 16 June 1943

== Previous units ==
Flying and notable non-flying units previously based at Lawrenny Ferry:

- 764 Naval Air Squadron (October 1941 - November 1943)

== See also ==
- HMS Daedalus II
- List of air stations of the Royal Navy
