= Pembroke Dockyard =

Former Royal Navy dockyard in Pembrokeshire, Wales

- Pembroke Dock, Pembrokeshire, Wales
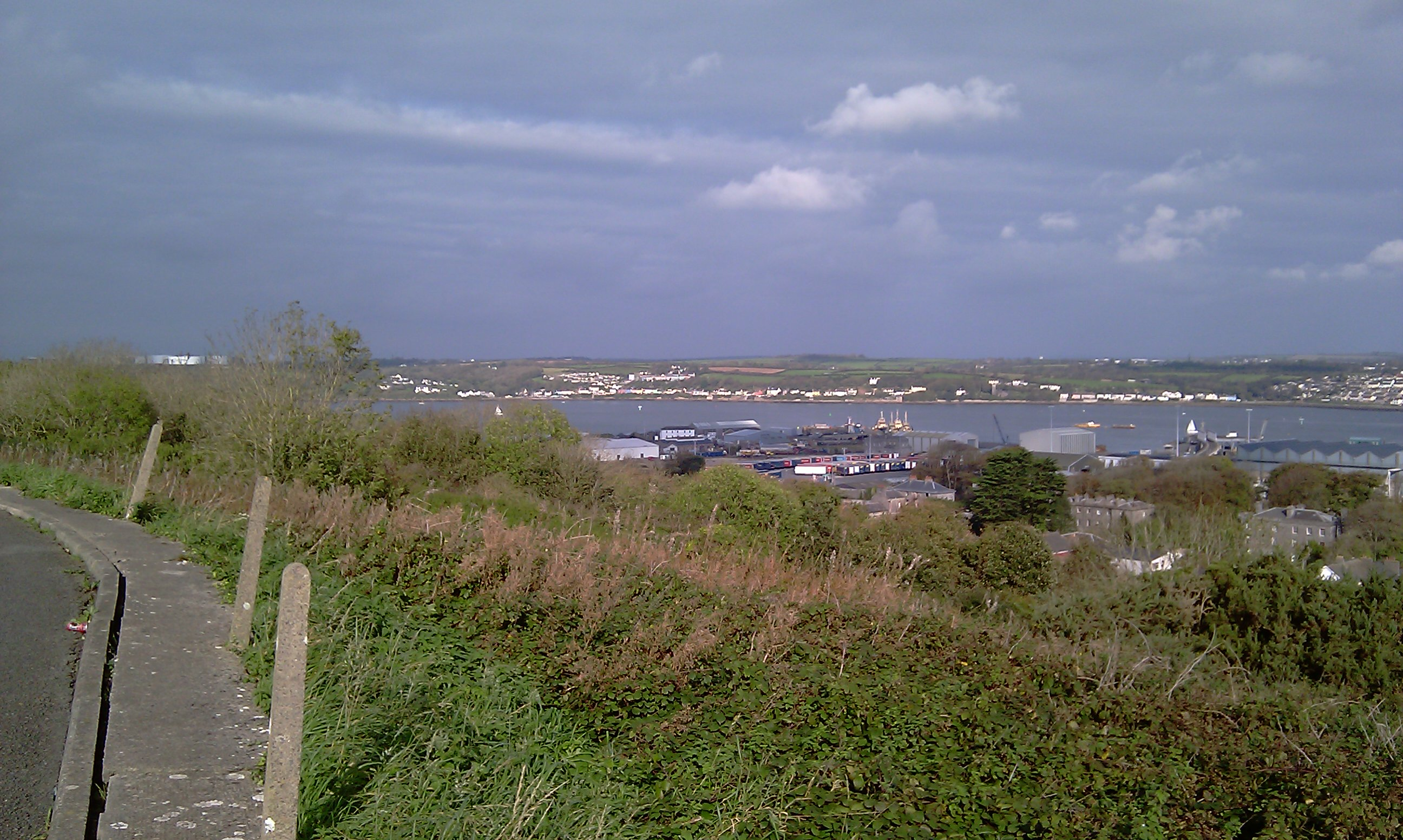
- The former Dockyard viewed from the Defensible Barracks

Site information
- Type: Dockyard

Location
- Coordinates: 51.6952°N 4.9548°W

Site history
- Built: 1814
- Fate: Closed 1926

Pembroke Dockyard, originally called Pater Yard, is a former Royal Navy Dockyard in Pembroke Dock, Pembrokeshire, Wales.

== History ==
=== Early naval presence at Milford Haven ===
The origins of naval shipbuilding on Milford Haven were in the private shipyard of Jacobs on the north side of the waterway. In November 1757, the Admiralty sent a surveying delegation to the haven, which prepared a report for Parliament recommending, "the construction of a Milford dock yard". No such place as Milford existed at this time, just the village of Hubberston. The report showed early signs of lobbying, with the scale of the local infrastructure and ship building activity exaggerated.

Dockyard development began on the north bank of the waterway. By the late 18th century, much of the village and the lands around Hubberston were owned by diplomat and politician Sir William Hamilton. Together with his nephew, the Hon. Charles Grenville, he proposed a scheme of development under the title "Milford", in reference to the 1758 report. They began by building a shipyard, and leased it to a Messrs. Harry and Joseph Jacob, though after receiving an order in 1796 to build a frigate and later a 74-gun ship-of-the-line, Jacobs went bankrupt. The Navy took over the shipyard lease.

In 1809, a naval commission recommended purchase of the Milford Haven facility and formal establishment of a Royal Navy dockyard. Milford was to be set up as a model dockyard under French management (possibly to develop the manoeuvrability of British ships) from which lessons could be learnt for implementation in other dockyards. However, the Admiralty failed to agree a purchase price for the existing Milford shipyard with Fulke Greville, Charles Greville's heir, so turned their attention to land 5 miles (8.0 km) across the haven from Milford in the called Pater (village) or Paterchurch. This was one of the few sites in the haven suitable for building a dock for constructing decent sized ships, as its shoreline was flat but led quickly into deep harbour. The Board of Ordnance had purchased 50 acres (20 ha) in preparation from the 1758 report to strengthen the haven's defences, which was added to by the purchase of an adjoining 20 acres (8.1 ha) for £5,500 from the Meyrick family.

=== Foundation ===
The dockyard at Pembroke Dock was founded in 1814, although not formally authorized until the Prince Regent signed the necessary Order in Council on 31 October 1815, and was known as Pater Yard until 1817. The Mayor of Pembroke had requested the change "in deference to the town of Pembroke some two miles (3.2 km) distant".

The site selected for the dockyard was greenfield land and the closest accommodations were in Pembroke. Office space was provided by the old frigate Lapwing after she was beached. The Royal Marine garrison was housed in the hulked 74-gun ship, HMS Dragon, after she was run aground in 1832. Many of the workmen commuted by boat from nearby communities until Pembroke Dock town was built up. In 1860 the dockyard's policing was transferred to the new No. 4 Division of the Metropolitan Police, which remained in that role until the 1920s.

=== Operations ===
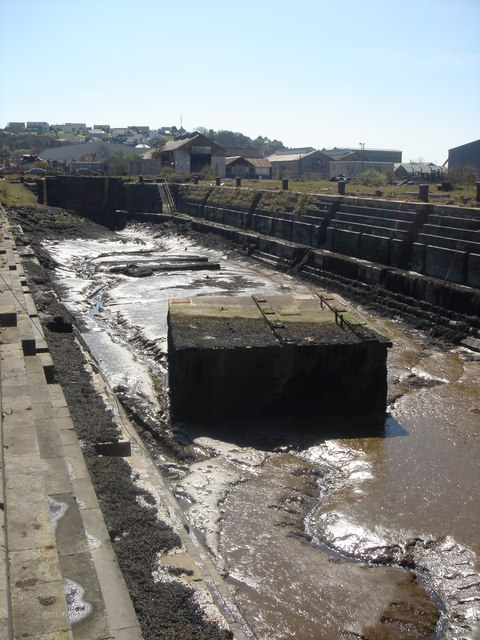
Disused former dry dock, Pembroke Dockyard

On 10 February 1816, the first two ships were launched from the dockyard – HMS Valorous and Ariadne, both 20-gun post-ships, subsequently converted at Plymouth Dockyard into 26-gun ships. Over the span of 112 years, five royal yachts were built, along with 263 other Royal Navy vessels. The last ship launched from the dockyard was the Royal Fleet Auxiliary tanker Oleander on 26 April 1922.

=== Closure ===
After the end of the First World War, the cash-strapped Admiralty looked for savings. In 1925, it announced that the Royal Dockyards at Pembroke Dock and Rosyth were redundant and would be closed. A petition was sent to Prime Minister Stanley Baldwin, stressing the lack of alternative employment and the economic consequences of closure, but the decision was not overturned, and Pembroke closed in 1926. First Sea Lord, Admiral of the Fleet Earl Beatty, said, "Whether these Yards are necessary for naval purposes, the Admiralty is the only competent judge. As to whether they are necessary for political or social reasons is for the Government to decide. The fact is, that so far as the upkeep of the Fleet is concerned, they are entirely redundant."

The Royal Air Force, however, built RAF Pembroke Dock on the site during the 1930s to house its flying boats, demolishing many of the existing buildings to make room for the necessary hangars and other facilities.

The last Pembroke-built ship afloat was the hulk of the iron screw frigate HMS Inconstant, which was broken up in Belgium in 1956. In June of the same year, Admiral Leonard Andrew Boyd Donaldson, the last Captain-Superintendent of Pembroke Dockyard, died aged 81.

=== Post-closure preservation and redevelopment ===
Although active warships were not based in Pembroke Dock after the 1940s, and formal dockyard work ceased in 1926, the base remained an official Royal Navy Dockyard, and retained a Queen's Harbour Master, until 2008 (one of the last 5 QHMs in the UK, together with those at the currently (2010) extant bases at Devonport, Portsmouth, Rosyth and Clyde). The Royal Maritime Auxiliary Service (RMAS) was based in Pembroke Dock until disestablishment in 2008, and the Ministry of Defence sold the freehold of the site to the Milford Haven Port Authority (MHPA) in 2007. For most of the last 20 years of MOD usage, the principal RMAS assets seen in the base were the MOD Salvage & Marine Team (formerly CSALMO) vessels located there, the majority of which were relocated to the Serco base in Burntisland on the River Forth upon the activation of the £1bn Future Provision of Marine Services (FPMS) contract in May 2008.

The dockyard wall is substantially complete and has been recently repaired by experts with dressed stone and lime mortar. The dry dock also remains, along with two out of ten building slips. The two listed hangars built to house the Sunderland flying boats used to guard the Western Approaches have been rebuilt and are now used for other purposes. Among several surviving Georgian and Victorian buildings on the site is the Terrace, a row of houses for the dockyard officers. The Dockyard Chapel at the end of the Terrace has been rebuilt using Objective One funding from the European Union and now serves as the Pembroke Dock Heritage Centre run by Pembroke Dock Sunderland Trust.

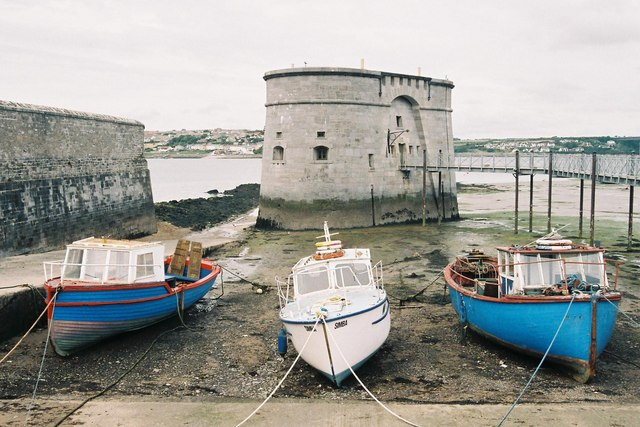
Dock wall and Martello tower

In 2021 permission was granted for 'ambitious plans to transform Pembroke Dock's historic dockyard' as part of a '£60 million marine energy project'. The Welsh Government decided not to call in the proposal, despite protests from SAVE Britain's Heritage, the Georgian Group, the Victorian Society the Naval Dockyards Society and the Society for the Protection of Ancient Buildings, among others. The proposal will see buildings within the conservation area demolished, the grade II* graving dock and the grade II timber pond infilled and built over, the remaining grade II listed building slips partially demolished and the setting of the adjacent grade II Carr Jetty damaged.

The chair of the local Commodore Trust (which has 'long fought to protect and revive the historic dockyard') has argued that 'these plans will see the destruction of a rare, if not unique, group of listed monuments that are a testament to the industry that gave birth to Pembroke Dock, revived the fortunes of Pembroke and gave the Milford Haven waterway a place in Wales, UK and world history'; Pembrokeshire County Council was persuaded by the developers (Port of Milford Haven) that the economic benefits of the project would 'far outweigh' its impact on the historic environment. The project will see the listed structures replaced by two five-storey warehouses (to house future shipbuilding operations) and 'a giant concrete slipway, stretching out into the water alongside the grade II listed Hobbs point causeway'.

== Administration of the dockyard ==
The admiral-superintendent was the Royal Navy officer in command of a larger Naval Dockyard. Portsmouth, Devonport and Chatham all had admiral-superintendents, as did some other dockyards in the United Kingdom and abroad at certain times. The admiral-superintendent usually held the rank of rear-admiral. His deputy was the captain of the dockyard (or captain of the port from 1969).

Some smaller dockyards, such as Sheerness and Pembroke, had a captain-superintendent instead, whose deputy was styled commander of the dockyard. The appointment of a commodore-superintendent was also made from time to time in certain yards.

The appointment of admiral-superintendents (or their junior equivalents) dates from 1832 when the Admiralty took charge of the Royal Dockyards. Prior to this larger dockyards were overseen by a commissioner who represented the Navy Board.

=== Resident Commissioner of the Navy, Pater Yard (1830–1832) ===
Included:

- Captain Charles Bullen, July 1830 – 1832

=== Captain-Superintendent, Pembroke Dockyard (1857–1926) ===
Included:

- Captain George Ramsay: July 1857-September 1862
- Captain William Loring: September 1862-March 1866
- Captain Robert Hall: March 1866-March 1871
- Captain William Armytage: February 1871-January 1872
- Captain Richard W. Courtenay: January 1872-March 1875
- Captain Richard Vesey Hamilton: March 1875-October 1877
- Captain George H. Parkin: October 1877-October 1882
- Captain Alfred J. Chatfield: October 1882-January 1886
- Captain Edward Kelly: January 1886-June 1887
- Commodore George Digby Morant: June 1887-January 1889
- Captain Samuel Long: January 1889-August 1891
- Captain Walter Stewart: August 1891-January 1893
- Captain Charles C.Penrose Fitzgerald: January 1893-March 1895
- Captain William H. Hall: March 1895
- Captain Charles J. Balfour: March 1895-October 1896
- Captain Burges Watson: October 1896-October 1899
- Captain Charles J. Barlow: October 1899-October 1902
- Captain Gerald Walter Russell: October 1902-October 1904
- Captain John Denison: October 1904-October 1906
- Captain Henry C. Kingsford: October 1906-December 1908
- Captain Godfrey H.B. Mundy: December 1908-December 1911
- Captain Alfred E.A. Grant: December 1911-September 1915 (promoted Rear-Admiral May 1915)
- Captain Frederick D. Gilpin Brown: September 1915-April 1918
- Captain John G. Armstrong: April 1918-February 1920
- Captain David Murray Anderson: February 1920-April 1922
- Captain the Hon. Arthur B. S. Dutton: April 1922-July 1924
- Captain Leonard A. B. Donaldson: July 1924 – 1926

== Listed buildings and Scheduled monuments ==
The site contains 107 listed buildings. One, the Paterchurch Tower is listed at Grade I and eighteen are listed at Grade II*, including the Defensible Barracks and the Garrison Chapel. The remainder are Grade II. There are three scheduled monuments, two, the Defensible Barracks and the South West Dockyard Tower which are also listed buildings, and the Bomb stores at West end of Fort Road. The list below details those structures graded I or II*, and the bomb store, the only scheduled monument that is not also listed.

Name	Location Grid Ref. (Note: Sometimes known as OSGB36, the grid reference is based on the British national grid reference system used by the Ordnance Survey.) Geo-coordinates	Date Listed	Function	Notes	Reference Number	Image
Paterchurch Tower	Pembroke Dock; SM9576303558; 51°41′37″N 4°57′23″W	14 July 1981	Tower	This medieval tower stood outside the dockyard walls prior to realignment of the walls in 1844.	14341	See more images
No 1, The Terrace	Pembroke Dock; SM9603803521; 51°41′36″N 4°57′09″W	18 January 1974	House	formerly listed together with the Commodore Club	6454	No 1, The Terrace
No 2, The Terrace	Pembroke Dock; SM9606303504; 51°41′35″N 4°57′08″W	18 January 1974	House		6455	No 2, The Terrace
No 3, The Terrace	Pembroke Dock; SM9607403501; 51°41′35″N 4°57′07″W	18 January 1974			14381	No 3, The Terrace
Dockyard Gates	Pembroke Dock; SM9602803524; 51°41′36″N 4°57′10″W	18 January 1974			14377	Dockyard Gates
Piers and Lodges on Admiralty Way (formerly listed with Dockyard Wall)	Pembroke Dock; SM9601403529; 51°41′36″N 4°57′10″W	18 January 1974			14378	Piers and Lodges on Admiralty Way (formerly listed with Dockyard Wall)
Port Hotel (formerly listed as the Commodore Club/Captain Superintendent's house)	Pembroke Dock; SM9599803533; 51°41′36″N 4°57′11″W	18 January 1974			14379	Port Hotel (formerly listed as the Commodore Club/Captain Superintendent's house)
Port Hotel Stable Range to South	Pembroke Dock; SM9599103507; 51°41′35″N 4°57′11″W	18 January 1974			14380	Port Hotel Stable Range to South
Garrison Chapel	Pembroke Dock; SM9628003484; 51°41′35″N 4°56′56″W	18 January 1974	Museum		6458	See more images
Former Guard House	Pembroke Dock; SM9603603636; 51°41′39″N 4°57′09″W	18 January 1974			6436	Former Guard House
The Old Storehouse	Pembroke Dock; SM9602503742; 51°41′43″N 4°57′10″W	18 January 1974		Situated to W of Sunderland House, behind ferry terminal.	6441	The Old Storehouse
Defensible Barracks	Pembroke Dock; SM9606703083; 51°41′22″N 4°57′07″W	18 January 1974	Barracks		6448	See more images
Barracks Platform	Pembroke Dock; SM9606703083; 51°41′22″N 4°57′07″W	18 January 1994			14372	Barracks Platform
South West Martello Tower	Pembroke Dock; SM9551803606; 51°41′38″N 4°57′36″W	18 February 1994	Martello tower	Fort Road (W End)	14353	See more images
North East Martello Tower	Pembroke Dock; SM9640603835; 51°41′46″N 4°56′51″W	18 February 1994	Martello tower	Front Street (N Side)	14354	See more images
Dry-Moat Walls	Pembroke Dock; SM9606703083; 51°41′22″N 4°57′07″W	18 January 1974			14371	Dry-Moat Walls
The Graving Dock including Bollards and Capstans (formerly listed with 13 Building Slips and Carr Jet)	Pembroke Dock; SM9583903927; 51°41′49″N 4°57′20″W	18 January 1974	Graving Dock		14393	The Graving Dock including Bollards and Capstans (formerly listed with 13 Building Slips and Carr Jet)
Zion Free Church, Meyrick Street	Pembroke Dock; SM9667403435; 51°41′34″N 4°56′36″W	14 July 1981	Church	Built 1846-8, extended 1866-7 and renovated 1882, 1911 and 1986.	6415	Zion Free Church, Meyrick Street
Zion Free Church Forecourt railings, piers and gates, Meyrick Street	Pembroke Dock; SM9669403432; 51°41′34″N 4°56′35″W	14 July 1981			14420	Zion Free Church Forecourt railings, piers and gates, Meyrick Street
Bomb stores at West end of Fort Road	Pembroke Dock; SM955035; 51°41′36″N 4°57′35″W	22 August 2017	Bomb store	Likely dating from 1934-39 when the site was redeveloped as an RAF flying boat station.	PE570	Bomb stores at West end of Fort Road
