= Pembroke Dock Military Cemetery =

Cemetery in Pembroke Dock, Wales

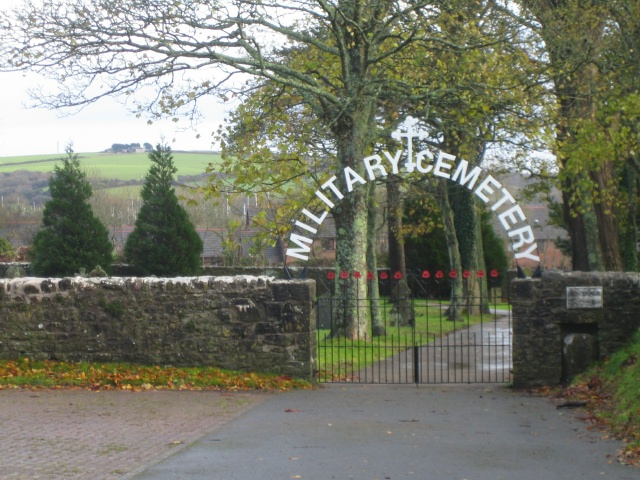
- Gates at entrance to cemetery
- Interactive map of Pembroke Dock Military Cemetery

Details
- Established: 1860
- Location: Pembroke Dock
- Country: Wales, UK
- Coordinates: 51.6971°N 4.9336°W
- Owned by: Ministry of Defence

Pembroke Dock Military Cemetery is a burial ground for military personnel. It is situated at Llanion in Pembroke Dock, Wales, and is the only dedicated military cemetery in the country.

The cemetery is believed to have opened around 1860, the date borne by its earliest graves. Forty Commonwealth service personnel who served in the First World War and 33 who served in the Second World War are buried there. The most recent burial took place in 1955. A Cross of Sacrifice within the cemetery grounds serves as the focal point for commemorative events.

The cemetery was forced to close to the public in 2013, when a sinkhole 20 feet deep opened up around the grave of Private Francis Ryan. The incident was believed to have been caused by the erosion of the limestone beneath the grave by water. It was partially reopened in January 2014 with the affected area fenced off, before clay-cement grouting was used to fill the sinkhole, allowing the cemetery to reopen fully in April 2014.

The cemetery is owned by the Ministry of Defence and is managed by the Defence Infrastructure Organisation.
