= Paterchurch Tower =

Building in Pembrokeshire, Wales

- Pembroke Dock, Pembrokeshire
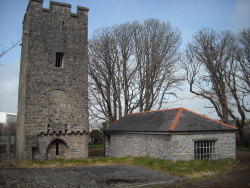
- Paterchurch Tower and the adjoining storehouse in Pembroke Dockyard

Site information
- Type: Fortified tower
- Open to the public: No

Location
- Shown within Wales
- Coordinates: 51.6934°N 4.9562°W
- Grid reference: grid reference SM95760355

Site history
- Materials: Rubble stone

Listed Building – Grade I

Paterchurch Tower is a Grade I-listed medieval fortified tower in Pembroke Dock, Pembrokeshire, Wales. It received its name from one of the families that owned the land. While its exact function is not known, it probably served as a pele tower for the manorial complex (now demolished) in which it was situated.

== History ==
The tower is the last remaining structure of a manorial complex whose surviving ruins were torn down with the expansion of Pembroke Dockyard in 1844. It received its name from the de Paterchurch family which originally owned the land. It probably served as a pele tower as there is no evidence of a church on site.

The land around the tower was purchased in 1759 by the Board of Ordnance to build an artillery battery to defend the interior of Milford Haven Waterway from attack. It was originally outside the dockyard walls when they were built in the mid-1810s, but expansion of the dockyard in 1844 brought it inside the walls. Bones were discovered around the base of the tower when workshops were built around it.

== Description ==
It is a three-storey building about 35-foot-high (10.7 m) with a crenellated parapet. The tower's rubble stone walls range in thickness from 2.5 to 4 feet (0.8 to 1.2 m). Each floor has a single vaulted chamber with plastered vaults in the upper two storeys.

== Status ==
The then owners Pembrokeshire County Council, placed it up for sale in July 2013.

== Bibliography ==
- Tiffany, M. N. E. (1992–1993). "Paterchurch: A Mystery Solved". Journal of the Pembrokeshire Historical Society. 5: 31–50.
