= Defensible Barracks, Pembroke Dock =

Victorian-era fortification in Wales

- Pembroke Dock, Pembrokeshire
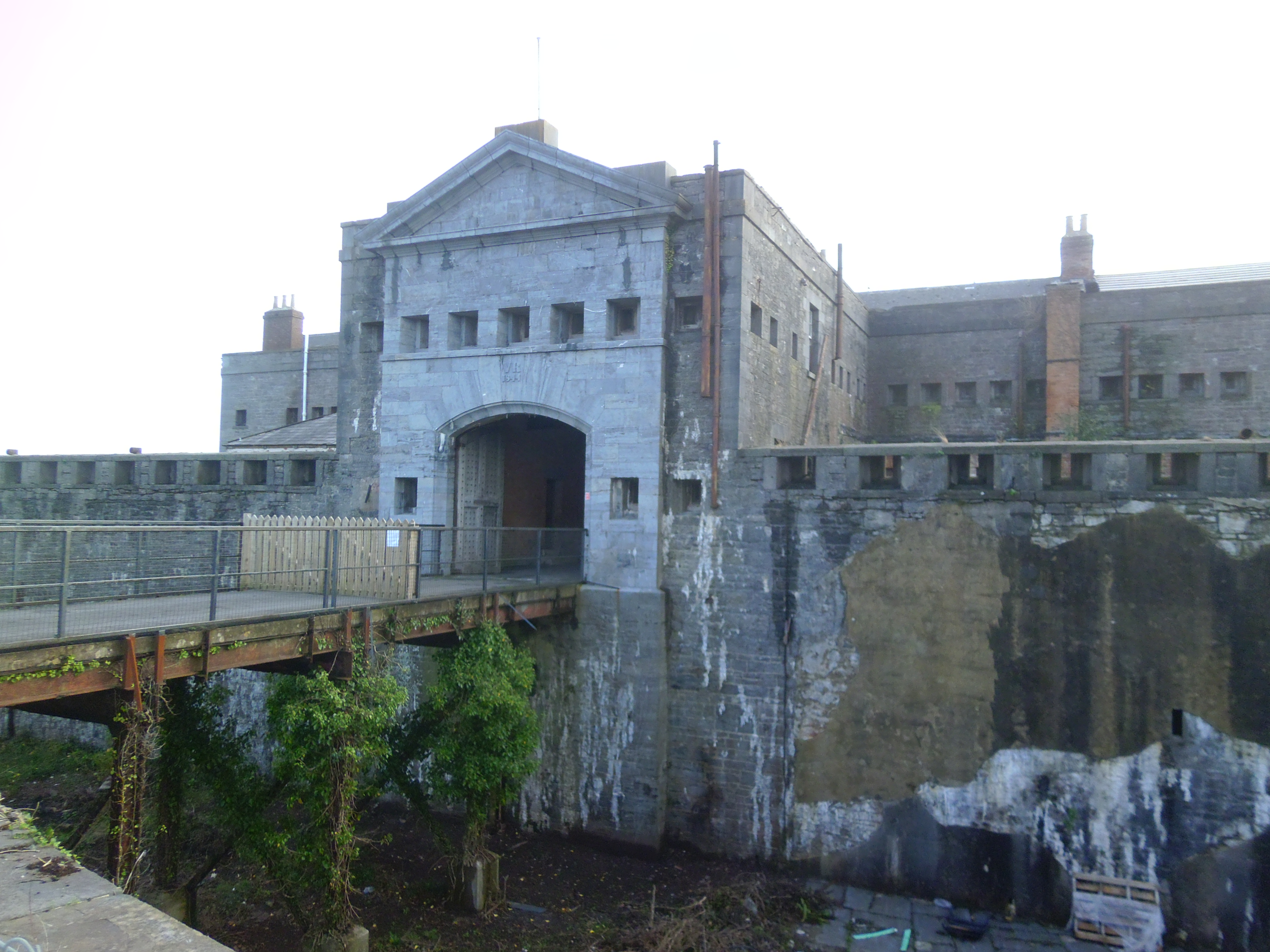
- Main Gate of the Defensible Barracks

Site information
- Type: Fort
- Open to the public: No

Location
- Shown within Wales
- Coordinates: 51.6889°N 4.9508°W
- Grid reference: grid reference SM961031

Site history
- Materials: Rubble stone

Listed Building – Grade II*

The Defensible Barracks at Pembroke Dock, is a Grade II* listed, Victorian-era fortification and barracks in Pembrokeshire, South Wales. It is a 20-sided stone fort surrounded by a dry moat with masonry walls. A parade ground occupies the centre of the fort. It was built in the mid-1840s to house the Royal Marines based in Pembroke Dockyard and to protect the dockyard.

== History ==
Map of Pembroke Dock surveyed between 1862-1864 with the Defensible Barracks and the yard

The barracks were built between 1841 and 1846 to house the dockyard's garrison of Royal Marines and to cover the landward side of the dockyard from an infantry assault. It was probably the last trace bastion fort built in Europe. Prior to the Defensible Barracks' construction, the Royal Marines were housed in the hulked 74-gun ship, HMS Dragon, that had been deliberately run aground in 1832.

The barracks were acquired by a private developer, with plans to convert it into residential accommodation, in September 2019. However, the property was for sale again in late 2022, and as of January 2024 remains so.

== Description ==
The barracks is in the form of a square bastion trace with four two-storey, barracks ranges surrounding the central parade ground. "The enclosed yard remains notable for being the finest Georgian-style square in Wales". A fortified gatehouse is in the middle of the north wall. The moat is about 16 feet (4.9 m) deep and 42 feet (12.8 m) wide and is crossed by a fixed modern steel bridge that replaced the original wooden sliding drawbridge that leads to the gatehouse. The scarp or inner wall of the moat rises above the height of the platform to serve as a parapet with musketry loopholes, except at the salient angles of the bastions to allow the guns mounted on the bastions' platform to fire over the parapet. All but the southwestern bastion still have some gun mountings remaining. The external walls of the gatehouse and the barracks ranges are also loopholed, although some of these have been fitted with sash windows.

== Bibliography ==
- Phillips, Lawrie (2014). Pembroke Dockyard and the Old Navy: A Bicentennial History. Stroud, Gloucestershire, UK: The History Press. ISBN 978-0-7509-5214-9.
