= Garrison Chapel =

Chapel in Pembroke Dock, Wales

Coordinates: 51.6930°N 4.9490°W

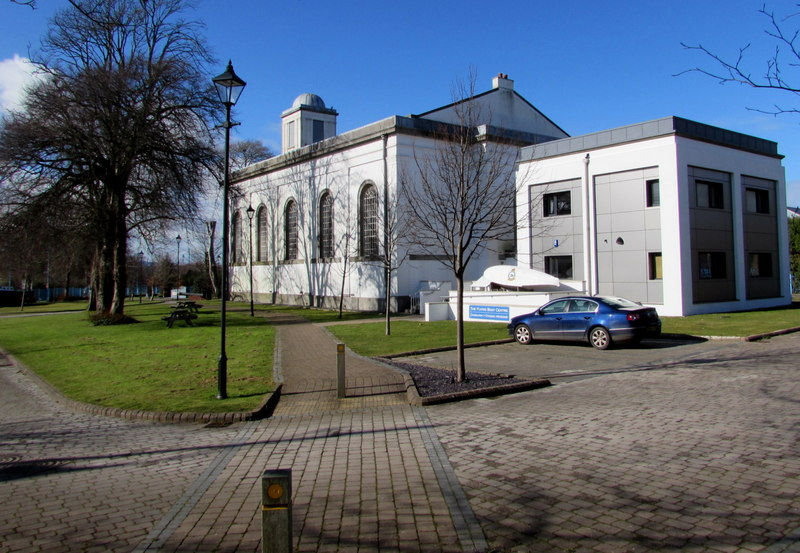
Garrison Chapel, Pembroke Dock

The Garrison Chapel is a chapel to the Royal Dockyard at Pembroke Dock in Pembrokeshire, Wales. It was designed by George Ledwell Taylor, Surveyor of Buildings to the Navy Board, in the early 1830s and was completed in 1834–35. Originally, £7,944 was allotted in the 1829–30 Naval Estimates, but this was reduced to £4,000 by the Controller of the Navy Board. A year after it was completed, another £3,500 was provided to build galleries to accommodate the increased numbers attending and to create an additional entrance.

From 1974 until 1986 it was used by the Pembrokeshire Motor Museum, but was then sold to a developer and fell into disrepair. It was compulsorily purchased by the county council in 2003.

It has been rebuilt using Objective One funding from the European Union and now houses the Pembroke Dock Heritage Centre run by Pembroke Dock Sunderland Trust. It is a Grade II* listed building.
