= Lawrenny =

Village and parish in Pembrokeshire, Wales

Coordinates: 51.727°N 4.872°W

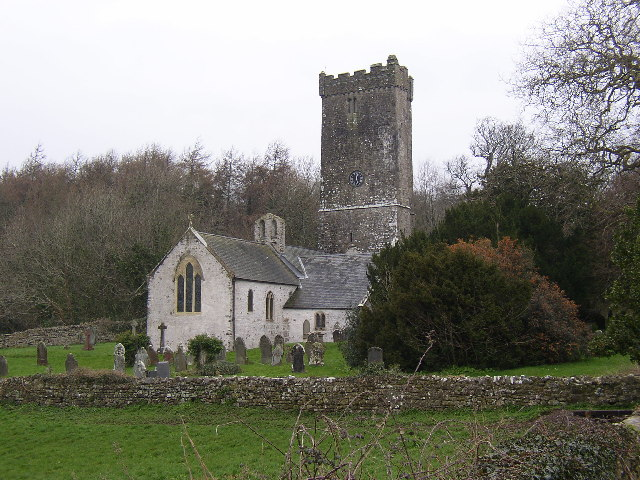
- Church of St Caradoc

- Location within Pembrokeshire
- Population: 100 (2020)
- OS grid reference: SN018070
- Community: Martletwy
- Principal area: Pembrokeshire
- Country: Wales
- Sovereign state: United Kingdom
- Police: Dyfed-Powys
- Fire: Mid and West Wales
- Ambulance: Welsh

Lawrenny is a village and parish in the community and electoral ward of Martletwy in the county of Pembrokeshire, Wales. It is on a peninsula of the River Cleddau estuary upriver from Milford Haven where it branches off towards the Cresswell and Carew Rivers and is in the Pembrokeshire Coast National Park.

== Description ==
The village extends down to the Estuary to Lawrenny Quay half a mile from the centre, where there is a busy yacht station and caravan park. It provides most of the central rural facilities for the Martletwy ward, mobile post office, cricket and football clubs, village hall and church. The community owns and operates the Millennium Youth Hostel and the village shop which operates what is possibly a world first: an automated service that allows members to access 24 hours to buy essentials. The system was featured on ITV Wales news in 2016. The Lawrenny Arms and the Quayside Tearooms have recently become popular destinations in the area for both boaters and walkers. The village has its own community-run broadband service which provides Internet access across the village as well as to communities on the other side of the Cleddau Estuary. The village was featured in series 3 of Penelope Keith's Hidden Villages which aired on the Channel 4 in 2016.

== History ==
Lawrenny developed around fishing, boat building and as a staging point for quarried limestone extracted from quarries upriver. In the 1830s there were 422 inhabitants and there was a ferry over the Cresswell River. Racing stables in the village provided Wales' first and only Grand National winner, Kirkland, at Aintree in 1905.

Lawrenny played a role in the Second World War as a base for Supermarine Walrus seaplanes and a training centre, known as RNAS Lawrenny Ferry (HMS Daedalus II), operated by the Fleet Air Arm. Lawrenny was voted best village in Wales in 2007 (a competition run by Calor). The gardens of the demolished Lawrenny House are listed at Grade II on the Cadw/ICOMOS Register of Parks and Gardens of Special Historic Interest in Wales.

== Church ==
The parish church of Saint Caradoc is a grade II* listed building founded in the 12th century and altered considerably since, principally in the 19th century. The tower was added in the 15th century.
