= Pembroke Dock =

Town and community in Pembrokeshire, Wales

Coordinates: 51.693°N 4.946°W

Pembroke Dock: Welsh: Doc Penfro
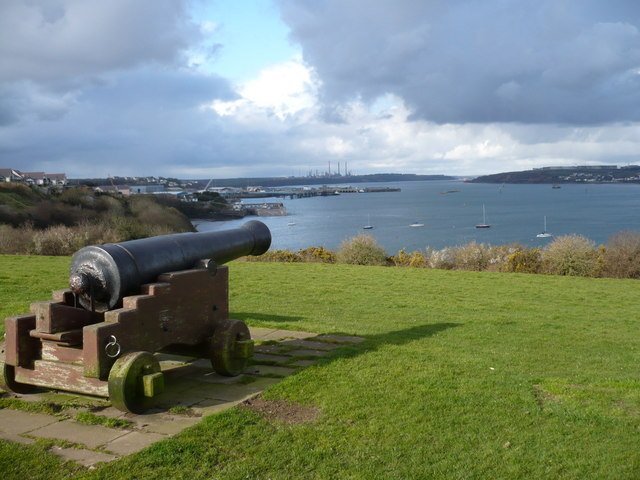
- Pembroke Dock and Cleddau Estuary

- Location of the community within Pembrokeshire
- Interactive map of Pembroke Dock
- Population: 9,657 (2021)
- OS grid reference: SM965035
- Community: Pembroke Dock
- Principal area: Pembrokeshire
- Preserved county: Dyfed
- Country: Wales
- Sovereign state: United Kingdom
- Post town: Pembroke Dock
- Postcode district: SA72
- Dialling code: 01646
- Police: Dyfed-Powys
- Fire: Mid and West Wales
- Ambulance: Welsh
- UK Parliament: Mid and South Pembrokeshire
- Senedd Cymru – Welsh Parliament: Ceredigion Penfro

Pembroke Dock (Welsh: Doc Penfro) is a port town and a community in Pembrokeshire, South West Wales, 3 miles (5 km) northwest of Pembroke on the banks of the River Cleddau.

Originally Paterchurch, a small fishing village, Pembroke Dock town expanded rapidly following the construction of the Royal Navy Dockyard in 1814. The Cleddau Bridge links Pembroke Dock with Neyland.

After Haverfordwest and Milford Haven, Pembroke Dock is the third-largest town in Pembrokeshire being more populous than neighbouring Pembroke.

== History ==
The natural harbour (now the Milford Haven Waterway) offering shelter from the prevailing south-westerly winds, has probably been used for many thousands of years. From maps, the first evidence of settlement is the name of the Carr Rocks at the entrance, derived from the Norse-language skare for rock.

From 790 until the Norman Invasion (1066) the estuary was used by the Vikings. During one visit, either in 854 or in 878, maybe on his way to the Battle of Cynuit, the Viking chieftain Hubba wintered in the haven with 23 ships.

In 1172, King Henry II's fleet and army were prepared in the mouth of the Pembroke River and sailed to Ireland during the Norman Invasion of Ireland.

Until 1814, the area was mostly farmland and known as Paterchurch. The first recorded mention of Paterchurch was in 1289. A medieval tower was built and like nearby 18th century and 19th century fortifications, it may have served as a lookout post. By the 17th century, additional domestic and farm buildings stood close to the tower and the isolated settlement had its own cemetery, whose last recorded burial is that of a Roger Adams, in 1731. The ruin of the tower now lies within the walls of the dockyard.

Paterchurch Tower was the centre of an estate said to stretch from Pennar Point to Cosheston. This changed hands in 1422 when Ellen de Paterchurch married a John Adams. Prior to the building of the town and before the dockyard was thought of, various sales and exchanges took place between the principal local landowners – the Adams, Owen and Meyrick families. These exchanges left the Meyricks in control of most of the land on which the dockyard and new town were to develop. By 1802 the Paterchurch buildings were mostly ruins.

During the Second World War Pembroke Dock was targeted by the German Luftwaffe. On Monday 19 August 1940 a Luftwaffe Junkers Ju 88 bomber flew up the haven waterway and bombed a series of oil tanks sited at Pennar. The oil-fuelled fire that followed raged for 18 days and was recorded as the largest UK conflagration since the Great Fire of London. Bombing on the night of 11 and 12 May 1941 resulted in 30 people killed and many injured in the town. Nearly 2,000 houses were damaged.

=== Naval dockyards ===
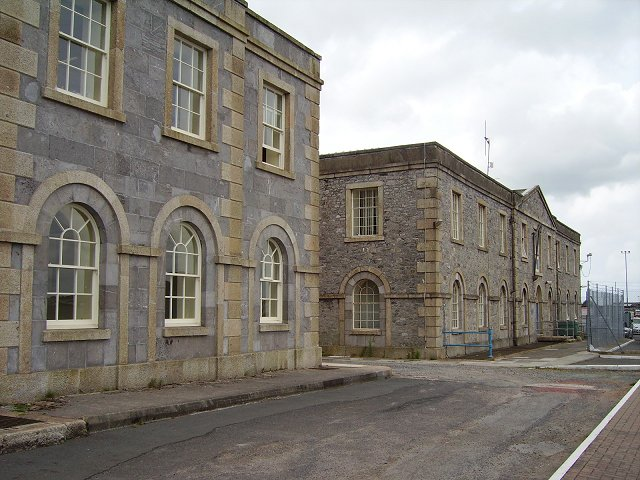
Former dockyard buildings: offices ('Sunderland House', left) and storehouse (right)

The origins of naval shipbuilding on Milford Haven were on the north side of the waterway. In November 1757, the Admiralty sent a surveying delegation to the haven, which prepared a report for Parliament recommending, "the construction of a Milford dock yard". Originally privately owned, the Navy took over the shipyard lease in 1796. In 1809, the Admiralty sought to purchase the facility outright and formally establish it as a Royal Navy dockyard, but failed to agree a purchase price.

Instead, the Admiralty agreed purchase of land across the haven, near the town of Pembroke in a district called Pater (village) or Paterchurch, and in 1814 Pembroke Dockyard was established, initially called Pater Dockyard. The site was one of the few in the haven suitable for a dock for constructing decent sized ships, as its shoreline was flat but led quickly into deep harbour. Construction started immediately, with a former frigate driven ashore as a temporary accommodation hulk. Orders were placed for the construction of a 74 gun battleship and four frigates. After the Battle of Waterloo in June 1815, the scheme still seemed ill placed in what would be a smaller Royal Navy, but the final plans were given the go ahead on 31 October 1815.

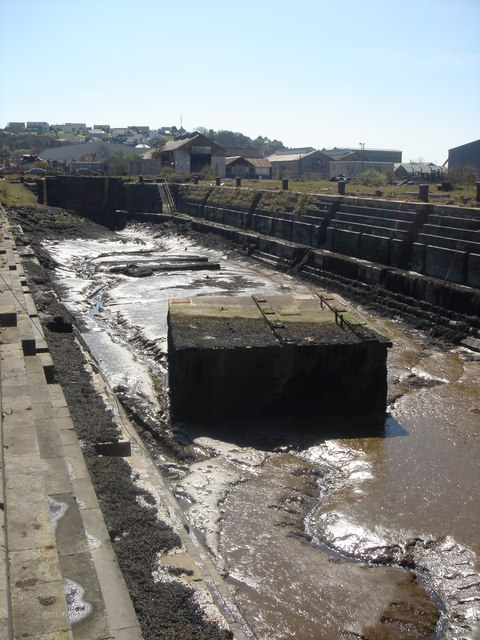
Disused former dry dock, Pembroke Dockyard

On 10 February 1816, the first two ships were launched from the dockyard – HMS Valorous and Ariadne, both 20-gun post-ships, subsequently converted at Plymouth Dockyard into 26-gun ships. Over the span of 112 years, five royal yachts were built, along with 263 other Royal Navy vessels. The last ship launched from the dockyard was the Royal Fleet Auxiliary tanker Oleander on 26 April 1922.

After the First World War, the dockyard was closed by the cash-strapped Admiralty as redundant in 1926. A petition was sent to Prime Minister Stanley Baldwin, stressing the lack of alternative employment and the economic consequences of closure, but the decision was not overturned.

The Royal Maritime Auxiliary Service (RMAS) maintained a base in Pembroke Dock until disestablishment in 2008, including the MOD Salvage & Marine Team. The Ministry of Defence sold the freehold of the site to the Milford Haven Port Authority (MHPA) in 2007.

The dockyard wall is substantially complete and the dry dock also remains, along with two out of ten building slips. Among several surviving Georgian and Victorian buildings on the site is the Terrace, a row of houses for the dockyard officers. Garrison Chapel at the end of the Terrace has been rebuilt using Objective One funding from the European Union and now serves as the Pembroke Dock Heritage Centre run by Pembroke Dock Heritage Trust.

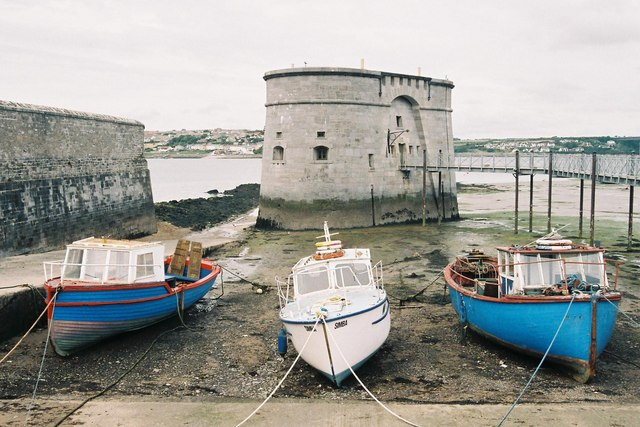
Dock wall and Martello tower

=== Garrison ===
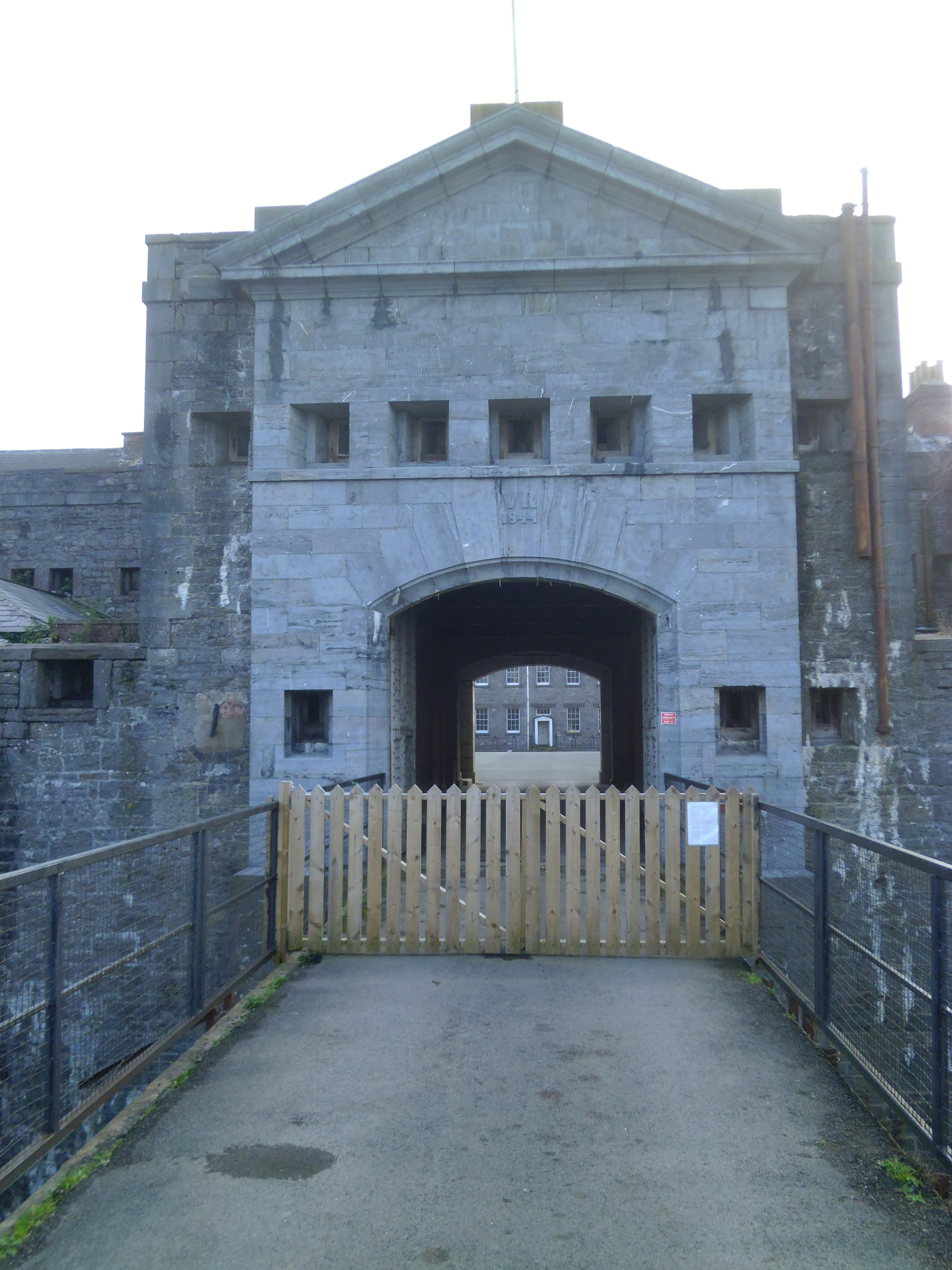
Defensible barracks, gatehouse

As the dockyard and its importance grew, the need to defend it was addressed and Pembroke Dock became a military town. Work began in 1844 to build defensible barracks. In 1845 the first occupiers were the Royal Marines of the Portsmouth Division, followed through the years by many famous regiments. Between 1849 and 1857, two Martello towers of dressed Portland stone were constructed at the south-western and north-western corner of the dockyard; both were garrisoned by sergeants of artillery and their families.

In the 1850s a hutted encampment was established nearby on Llanion Hill. In 1904 this was replaced by four brick-built barrack blocks, designed to house a thousand troops. The new Llanion Barracks was 'the first barracks to be constructed with a separate area for cooking and ablutions and was one of the most modern in the country'.

The town remained garrisoned with troops until 1967. The two Martello towers remain: one was a local museum but is for sale by auction in July 2019, while the other is in private hands and has been converted for residential use and is largely intact. A few buildings on the Llanion site still stand. The Officers' and Sergeants' Mess once used as council offices is now occupied by Pembrokeshire Coast National Park. The original guardroom remains and is now residential accommodation, and a listed Victoria Powder Magazine remains set into the coastal slope which is accessible from Connacht Way. The old parade square has recently been converted for housing.

=== RAF base ===
The hangars dominate the landscape

With the closure of the dockyard in 1926, the year of the general strike, unemployment was high through the Great Depression until 1931 when No. 210 Squadron RAF arrived equipped with Southampton II flying boats. For almost 30 years the Royal Air Force was based at Pembroke Dock. During 1943, when home to the Sunderland flying boats used to guard the Western Approaches, it was the largest operational base for flying boats in the world.

It was announced in 1957 that the RAF would be drastically reducing its presence. The two listed hangars have been rebuilt and are now used for other purposes. The full-scale Millennium Falcon built for The Empire Strikes Back was created in one of the hangars by Marcon Fabrications in 1979.

== Governance ==
There are two tiers of local government covering Pembroke Dock, at community (town) and county level: Pembroke Dock Town Council and Pembrokeshire County Council.

The town council comprises 16 councillors and is based at 28 Dimond Street, a converted shop in the town centre.

In May 2022, Billy Gannon, one of the town councillors, was rumoured to be English street artist Banksy. He subsequently resigned because this was affecting his ability to carry out the duties of a councillor.

For representation on the county council, Pembroke Dock is divided into four electoral wards: (Pembroke Dock Central, Pembroke Dock Llanion, Pembroke Dock Market and Pembroke Dock Pennar), which each elect one county councillor.

=== Administrative history ===
Pembroke Dock formed part of the ancient parish of Pembroke St Mary, which was part of the borough of Pembroke. The borough was reformed to become a municipal borough in 1836, retaining the same boundaries and therefore continuing to include the growing town of Pembroke Dock. By 1895 Pembroke Borough Council had adopted the practice of holding its meetings alternately at Pembroke Town Hall and at Pembroke Dock, where the council had established its main administrative offices at 37 Bush Street (renumbered 71 Bush Street in 1906). The council remained based at 71 Bush Street (and later also expanded into neighbouring 73 Bush Street) until the early 1970s when it acquired Llanion Park, part of the Llanion Barracks at Pembroke Dock, to serve as its headquarters.

Pembroke Borough Council was abolished under the Local Government Act 1972, with the area becoming part of the new district of South Pembrokeshire within the county of Dyfed on 1 April 1974. A community was established to cover the area of the former borough, with its council taking the name Pembroke Town Council. South Pembrokeshire District Council took over Llanion Park at Pembroke Dock to serve as its headquarters.

On 1 April 1986 the community of Pembroke was split into a Pembroke Dock community and a reduced Pembroke community, just covering the older town. This was the first time Pembroke Dock had been administered separately from Pembroke. The Pembroke Dock community council chose to call itself Pembroke Dock Town Council.

South Pembrokeshire was abolished in 1996, with the area becoming part of a re-established Pembrokeshire.

== Demographics ==
Census population for Pembroke Dock community
Census	Population	Female	Male	Households	Source
2001	8,676	4,481	4,195	3,695	
2011	9,753	4,912	4,841	4,171	
2021	9,657	4,904	4,753	4,434	

== Economy ==
The Pembrokeshire Technium was built and opened in 2006 and succeeded by Technium Science. Although the initial interest was slow the first major uptake on this facility began in 2009 when Infinergy built a wind farm in the local area and based its local office in the centre. Following its removal from the Welsh Government’s Technium network it was rebranded as the Bridge Innovation Centre in 2013. There has been approval given by Pembrokeshire County Council for a new yacht marina to be built alongside Front Street but work has yet to begin.

=== Dockyard regeneration ===
In 2021 permission was granted for 'ambitious plans to transform Pembroke Dock's historic dockyard' as part of a '£60 million marine energy project', despite protests from heritage groups. Some buildings within the conservation area will be demolished, the grade II* graving dock and the grade II timber pond infilled and built over, the remaining grade II listed building slips partially demolished and the setting of the adjacent grade II Carr Jetty damaged. These will be replaced by two five-storey warehouses (to house future shipbuilding operations) and 'a giant concrete slipway, stretching out into the water alongside the grade II listed Hobbs point causeway'.

== Transport ==
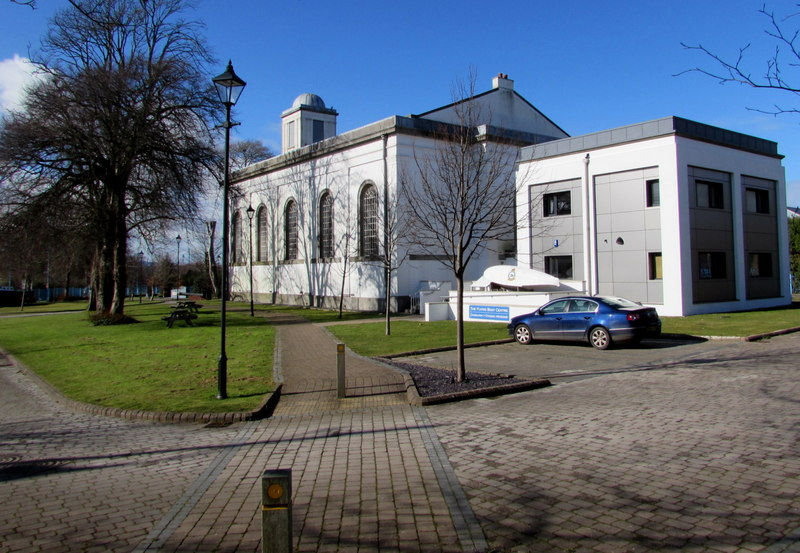
Pembroke Dock Heritage Centre, housed in the former dockyard chapel

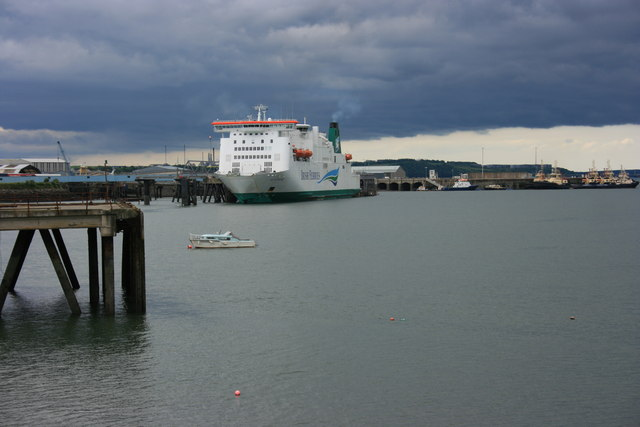
Pembroke Dock ferry terminal

Pembroke Dock is served by the A477 trunk road which runs from the A40 at St. Clears. At Waterloo the A477 road crosses the Daugleddau estuary on the Cleddau Bridge and continues toward Haverfordwest. It has a ferry terminal from which ferries sail twice-daily to Rosslare in Ireland. The service is operated by Irish Ferries. There is also a deep water cargo port (Pembroke Port) adjacent to the ferry terminal which is operated by the Port of Milford Haven.

Pembroke Dock railway station has service to Cardiff Central via Carmarthen with trains running every 2 hours.

Bus services run to surrounding villages and towns. These services are run by Pembrokeshire County Council and First Cymru.

National Express run services to Haverfordwest, Birmingham and London.

== Amenities ==
Two cemeteries in the town both hold many service graves. Pembroke Dock (Llanion) Cemetery contains the war graves of 23 Commonwealth service personnel, including two unidentified Royal Navy sailors, of the First World War and 51 of the Second, including four unidentified Royal Navy sailors and an unidentified airman. Pembroke Dock Military Cemetery contains the war graves of 40 Commonwealth service personnel of the First World War and 33 of the Second, and is believed to be the only dedicated military cemetery in Wales.

== Notable people ==
- Brigadier General Henry Stanhope Sloman, (1861–1945), a senior British Army officer during WWI.
- John Harper Narbeth (1863–1944) a naval architect of the Royal Corps of Naval Constructors.
- Sir John Blake-Reed (1882–1966), a British judge who served in Colonial Egypt.
- Major Geoffrey Theodore Garratt (1888-1942) author, interred Pembroke Dock Military Cemetery .
- Ernie Finch (1899-1983), a Welsh international rugby union wing, played club rugby for Llanelli RFC.
- Colin George (1929–2016), a Welsh actor and director.
- Phil Carradice (born 1947) a Welsh writer and broadcaster.
- Andy Goddard (born 1968), a Welsh director and screenwriter.
- Taliesin Selley (born 1980), a Welsh former rugby union footballer.

== Renaming proposals ==
There have been suggestions that Pembroke Dock should change its name, to improve the town's image in respect of a reputation for high unemployment and industrial decline. Proposals have included Pembroke Haven, Pembroke Harbour and a reversion to the original pre-1814 name of Paterchurch. A change of name was rejected in a referendum in the 1960s, and was again proposed in 2003.

== Freedom of the Town ==
HMS Pembroke of the Royal Navy received the Freedom of the Town of Pembroke Dock on 15 September 2006.

== See also ==
- History of Milford Haven
